= 88.1 FM =

FM radio frequency

The following radio stations broadcast on FM frequency 88.1 MHz:

== Argentina ==
- Maus in Rosario, Santa Fe
- Auténtica in La Plata, Buenos Aires
- Boedo in Buenos Aires
- Ciudad in Jujuy
- Ciudad in Reconquista, Santa Fe
- Ciudad in Tartagal, Salta
- Compacto in Chacabuco, Buenos Aires
- Formosa in Formosa
- Gospel in Buenos Aires
- Ideal in Monte Grande, Buenos Aires
- La Radio de Molinas in San Justo, Santa Fe
- LV 11 in Santiago del Estero
- Nacandpop in Córdoba
- Next in Cerrito, Entre Rios
- Noticias in Salta
- Plus in San Miguel de Tucumán, Tucumán
- Radio María in Ramos Mejía, Buenos Aires
- LRI 704 Rosales in Punta Alta, Buenos Aires

== Australia ==
- 2RDJ in Sydney
- 3MFM in Latrobe Valley, Victoria

== Brazil ==
- ZYD821 in São Paulo
- ZYD688 in Garibaldi, Rio Grande do Sul

== Canada (Channel 201) ==
- CBAF-FM-15 in Charlottetown, Prince Edward Island
- CBAL-FM-4 in Saint John, New Brunswick
- CBEE-FM in Chatham, Ontario
- CBON-FM-18 in Sault Ste. Marie, Ontario
- CBU-2-FM in Vancouver, British Columbia
- CBXI-FM in Hinton, Alberta
- CBYI-FM in Hagensborg, British Columbia
- CFRH-FM in Penetanguishene, Ontario
- CHDO-FM in Montreal, Quebec
- CHLK-FM in Perth, Ontario
- CHRI-FM-1 in Cornwall, Ontario
- CIHO-FM-3 in Petite-Rivière-Saint-François, Quebec
- CIHO-FM-4 in Saint-Siméon, Quebec
- CILA-FM in Cookshire, Quebec
- CIND-FM in Toronto, Ontario
- CJLR-FM-3 in Prince Albert, Saskatchewan
- CJWE-FM in Calgary, Alberta
- CKDU-FM in Halifax, Nova Scotia
- CKEW-FM in Smithers, British Columbia
- CKLN-FM in Toronto, Ontario (1983–2011)
- CKSB-10-FM in Winnipeg, Manitoba
- CKSS-FM in Parkland County, Alberta
- VF2215 in Mont-Wright, Quebec
- VF2280 in Athabasca Hydro Station, Saskatchewan
- VF2424 in Sept-Îles, Quebec
- VF2467 in Squamish, British Columbia
- VF2522 in Chilliwack, British Columbia
- VF7141 in Marionville, Ontario
- VF7206 in Hawkesbury, Ontario
- VF8000 in Rock Forest, Quebec
- VF8004 in Woburn, Quebec
- VF8009 in Windsor, Quebec

== China (mainland) ==
- CNR The Voice of China in Nanning
- CNR Business Radio in Harbin

== Dominican Republic ==
- Primera FM at Santo Domingo

== Hong Kong ==
- CR1, Commercial Radio Hong Kong in Mount Gough, Hong Kong

== Lithuania ==
- XFM in Kaunas

== Malaysia ==
- Eight FM in Klang Valley
- Kool FM in Malacca
- Gegar in Kota Bharu, Kelantan
- Nasional FM in Kuching, Sarawak
- Radio Klasik in Kota Kinabalu, Sabah
- Sarawak FM in Miri, Sarawak

== Mexico ==
- XHADM-FM in Ahualulco de Mercado, Jalisco
- XHANC-FM in Cancún, Quintana Roo
- XHCCCR-FM in Tantoyuca, Veracruz
- XHCCCX-FM in Cañitas de Felipe Pescador, Zacatecas
- XHCPDB-FM in Chihuahua, Chihuahua
- XHCSEB-FM in Adolfo Lopez Mateos (Casa Blanca), Culiacán, Sinaloa
- XHCSGT-FM in La Paz, Baja California
- XHGIK-FM in Frontera, Coahuila
- XHJM-FM in Guadalupe/Monterrey, Nuevo León
- XHÑUC-FM in Chalcatongo de Hidalgo/San Agustín Tlacotepec, Oaxaca
- XHPTUN-FM in Tunkás, Yucatán
- XHSCEG-FM in Buena Vista 1ra. Sección, Centro, Tabasco
- XHSCGB-FM in San Baltazar Chichicápam, Oaxaca
- XHSCJS-FM in Tepezalá, Aguascalientes
- XHSCPH-FM in San Juan Xiutetelco, Puebla
- XHRE-FM in Celaya, Guanajuato
- XHRED-FM in Mexico City
- XHRMO-FM in Hermosillo, Sonora
- XHYAM-FM in José María Morelos, Quintana Roo
- XHZN-FM in Zamora, Michoacán

== New Zealand ==
- Various low-power stations up to 1 watt

== Nigeria ==
- Broadcasting Corporation of Abia State (BCA) Radio, Umuahia, Abia
- Gravity FM, Igboho, Oyo
- Smash FM Abeokuta, Abeokuta, Ogun
- Sunshine FM 88.1, Potiskum, Yobe

== Philippines ==
- DWJE in Dagupan
- MRGV FM in Escalante
- DYPW in Tanjay
- DXPE in Malaybalay
- DXAC in Aurora

== United Kingdom ==
- BBC Radio 2 (Argyll & Bute, Cirencester, Clyro Powys, Cumbria, Deiniolen, Devon, Essex, Grantham, Islay, Llanidloes, Mallaig, North Uist, Portree, S.W. London and Surrey, Snowdonia)

== United States (Channel 201) ==
- KAFM in Grand Junction, Colorado
- KAKI in Juneau, Alaska
- KATG (FM) in Athens, Texas
- KAWD-LP in Detroit Lakes, Minnesota
- KAYB in Sunnyside, Washington
- KAYT in Jena, Louisiana
- KBAP in Batesville, Arkansas
- KBBG in Waterloo, Iowa
- KBCU in North Newton, Kansas
- KBPW in Hampton, Arkansas
- KBTL in El Dorado, Kansas
- KCEP (FM) in Las Vegas, Nevada
- KCFD in Crawford, Nebraska
- KCFY in Yuma, Arizona
- KCGS in Marshall, Arkansas
- KCNT in Hastings, Nebraska
- KCOU in Columbia, Missouri
- KCRY in Mojave, California
- KCTI-FM in Gonzales, Texas
- KCUK in Chevak, Alaska
- KCWC-FM in Riverton, Wyoming
- KCWU in Ellensburg, Washington
- KDJC in Baker, Oregon
- KDNK in Glenwood Springs, Colorado
- KDPS in Des Moines, Iowa
- KDUP in Cedarville, California
- KEBR in Sacramento, California
- KECG in El Cerrito, California
- KEJS in Sargent, Nebraska
- KENE in Eagle Tail, New Mexico
- KFCF in Fresno, California
- KFGL in Butte, Montana
- KFGR in Powell, Wyoming
- KFHC in Ponca, Nebraska
- KFLK in Minot, North Dakota
- KFPS in False Pass, Alaska
- KFRI (FM) in Stanton, Texas
- KFTG in Pasadena, Texas
- KGFJ (FM) in Belt, Montana
- KGGA in Gallup, New Mexico
- KGIF (FM) in Tafuna, American Samoa
- KGKV in Doss, Texas
- KGLL in Gillette, Wyoming
- KGNZ in Abilene, Texas
- KGRH in Loomis, South Dakota
- KGRI (FM) in Lebanon, Oregon
- KGVA in Fort Belknap Agency, Montana
- KHID in Mcallen, Texas
- KHJR in St. Thomas, Missouri
- KHMG in Barrigada, Guam
- KHOY in Laredo, Texas
- KHPR in Honolulu, Hawaii
- KHTU in Wray, Colorado
- KICB in Fort Dodge, Iowa
- KIDS (FM) in Grants, New Mexico
- KIYU-FM in Galena, Alaska
- KJDR in Guymon, Oklahoma
- KJKR in Jamestown, North Dakota
- KJTY in Topeka, Kansas
- KJVL (FM) in Hutchinson, Kansas
- KJYS in McCook, Nebraska
- KKJZ in Long Beach, California
- KKQA in Akutan, Alaska
- KKRI in Pocola, Oklahoma
- KKWV in Aransas Pass, Texas
- KKWY in Wheatland, Wyoming
- KLBD in Premont, Texas
- KLBR in Bend, Oregon
- KLBT in Beaumont, Texas
- KLCM in Ulysses, Kansas
- KLFC (FM) in Branson, Missouri
- KLFO in Florence, Oregon
- KLJT in Saint Louis, Missouri
- KLTU in Mammoth, Arizona
- KLUW in East Wenatchee, Washington
- KLWG in Lompoc, California
- KLWL in Chillicothe, Missouri
- KMLV in Ralston, Nebraska
- KMPQ in Roseburg, Oregon
- KMPZ in Salida, Colorado
- KMSI in Moore, Oklahoma
- KNKL in Ogden, Utah
- KNLE-FM in Round Rock, Texas
- KNMA in Tularosa, New Mexico
- KNNB in Whiteriver, Arizona
- KNSQ in Mount Shasta, California
- KNTU in Mckinney, Texas
- KOFK-FM in Bozeman, Montana
- KOGJ in Kenai, Alaska
- KOIA in Storm Lake, Iowa
- KOYA in Rosebud, South Dakota
- KPAQ in Plaquemine, Louisiana
- KPFZ-FM in Lakeport, California
- KPGR in Pleasant Grove, Utah
- KPGS in Pagosa Springs, Colorado
- KPJM in Payson, Arizona
- KPPP-LP in Fargo, North Dakota
- KPRQ in Sheridan, Wyoming
- KQHR in The Dalles, Oregon
- KQMD in Quemado, Texas
- KQNC in Quincy, California
- KQOC in Gleneden Beach, Oregon
- KQTO in Hurley, New Mexico
- KQUE-FM in Bay City, Texas
- KRBP in Presidio, Texas
- KREE in Pirtleville, Arizona
- KRFI in Redwood Falls, Minnesota
- KRLP in Windom, Minnesota
- KRLX in Northfield, Minnesota
- KRNM in Chalan Kanoa-Saipan, Northern Mariana Islands
- KRQA in Bentonville, Arkansas
- KRRB in Kuna, Idaho
- KRSD in Sioux Falls, South Dakota
- KRTM in Banning, California
- KRTT in Great Bend, Kansas
- KRUA in Anchorage, Alaska
- KSRH in San Rafael, California
- KTCV in Kennewick, Washington
- KTFY in Buhl, Idaho
- KTFZ in Thompson Falls, Montana
- KTQQ in Elko, Nevada
- KTUA in Coweta, Oklahoma
- KTXT-FM in Lubbock, Texas
- KUCC in Clarkston, Washington
- KUHU in Monticello, Utah
- KUSW in Flora Vista, New Mexico
- KUYI in Hotevilla, Arizona
- KVAM in Cheyenne, Wyoming
- KVDM in Hays, Kansas
- KVED in Vernon, Texas
- KVJS in Arroyo, Texas
- KVLW in Waco, Texas
- KVOD in Lakewood, Colorado
- KVSC in Saint Cloud, Minnesota
- KWAO in Vashon, Washington
- KWAS in Borger, Texas
- KWOU in Woodward, Oklahoma
- KWTF in Bodega Bay, California
- KWVA in Eugene, Oregon
- KXBT in Somerville, Texas
- KXEM in Roundup, Montana
- KYRS in Medical Lake, Washington
- KYTR in Union Gap, Washington
- KZCK in Colby, Kansas
- KZSC in Santa Cruz, California
- WAJC in Newport, Minnesota
- WAMP in Jackson, Tennessee
- WARY in Valhalla, New York
- WAXG in Mount Sterling, Kentucky
- WAXR in Geneseo, Illinois
- WAYD in Auburn, Kentucky
- WAYF in West Palm Beach, Florida
- WAYH in Harvest, Alabama
- WAYT-FM in Thomasville, Georgia
- WAZD in Savannah, Tennessee
- WBCJ in Spencerville, Ohio
- WBFH in Bloomfield Hills, Michigan
- WBGM in New Berlin, Pennsylvania
- WBGU in Bowling Green, Ohio
- WBGY in Naples, Florida
- WBLW in Gaylord, Michigan
- WBMF in Crete, Illinois
- WCHC in Worcester, Massachusetts
- WCQS in Asheville, North Carolina
- WCRJ in Jacksonville, Florida
- WCRP in Guayama, Puerto Rico
- WCRX in Chicago, Illinois
- WCSW in Arrowsmith, Illinois
- WCWP in Brookville, New York
- WDFB-FM in Danville, Kentucky
- WDIY in Allentown, Pennsylvania
- WDNJ in Hopatcong, New Jersey
- WDPR in Dayton, Ohio
- WDSW-LP in Cleveland, Mississippi
- WEFR in Erie, Pennsylvania
- WELH in Providence, Rhode Island
- WESN in Bloomington, Illinois
- WESU in Middletown, Connecticut
- WFGU-LP in Winchester, Ohio
- WFHL in New Bedford, Massachusetts
- WFSK-FM in Nashville, Tennessee
- WGHW in Lockwoods Folly Town, North Carolina
- WGML in Vanceboro, North Carolina
- WGWR in Liberty, New York
- WGWS in St. Mary's City, Maryland
- WHHN in Hollidaysburg, Pennsylvania
- WHID in Green Bay, Wisconsin
- WHIJ in Ocala, Florida
- WHJL in Merrill, Wisconsin
- WHOV in Hampton, Virginia
- WHPR-FM in Highland Park, Michigan
- WHRL in Emporia, Virginia
- WHRQ in Sandusky, Ohio
- WHYT in Goodland Township, Michigan
- WIHM-FM in Harrisburg, Illinois
- WIID in Rodanthe, North Carolina
- WJIS in Bradenton, Florida
- WJJJ in Beckley, West Virginia
- WJPG in Cape May Court House, New Jersey
- WJSP-FM in Warm Springs, Georgia
- WJTY in Lancaster, Wisconsin
- WJYJ in Hickory, North Carolina
- WJZZ in Montgomery, New York
- WKEL in Webster, New York
- WKGO in Murrysville, Pennsylvania
- WKIV in Westerly, Rhode Island
- WKJL in Clarksburg, West Virginia
- WKNC-FM in Raleigh, North Carolina
- WKRE in Argo, Alabama
- WKRY in Versailles, Indiana
- WKVY in Somerset, Kentucky
- WKWP in Williamsport, Pennsylvania
- WLGH in Leroy Township, Michigan
- WLHV in Annandale-on-Hudson, New York
- WLRA in Lockport, Illinois
- WLTL in La Grange, Illinois
- WLWJ in Petersburg, Illinois
- WLWX in Wheaton, Illinois
- WLXP in Savannah, Georgia
- WMAW-FM in Meridian, Mississippi
- WMBL in Mitchell, Indiana
- WMBR in Cambridge, Massachusetts
- WMEK in Kennebunkport, Maine
- WMEY in Bowdoin, Maine
- WMHS in Pike Creek, Delaware
- WMKJ in Tavernier, Florida
- WMNR in Monroe, Connecticut
- WMTG-LP in Mount Gilead, North Carolina
- WMTQ in Elmira, New York
- WMUL in Huntington, West Virginia
- WMWK in Milwaukee, Wisconsin
- WNAP-FM in Morristown, Indiana
- WNAS in New Albany, Indiana
- WNBV in Grundy, Virginia
- WNCH in Norwich, Vermont
- WNEE in Patterson, Georgia
- WNJT-FM in Trenton, New Jersey
- WNLD in Decatur, Illinois
- WNTH in Winnetka, Illinois
- WOLM in D'Iberville, Mississippi
- WOPR in Madison, North Carolina
- WPEB in Philadelphia, Pennsylvania
- WPRZ-FM in Brandy Station, Virginia
- WPTH in Olney, Illinois
- WQWA-LP in Columbus, Wisconsin
- WRFL in Lexington, Kentucky
- WRGN in Sweet Valley, Pennsylvania
- WRGP in Homestead, Florida
- WRIH in Richmond, Virginia
- WRJA-FM in Sumter, South Carolina
- WRJS in Soperton, Georgia
- WRQV in Ridgway, Pennsylvania
- WRSN in Lebanon, Tennessee
- WSBF-FM in Clemson, South Carolina
- WSDP in Plymouth, Michigan
- WSFP in Harrisville, Michigan
- WSJL in Bessemer, Alabama
- WSLZ in Cape Vincent, New York
- WSMF in Monroe, Michigan
- WSOG in Spring Valley, Illinois
- WSQN in Greene, New York
- WSRC in Waynetown, Indiana
- WSRU in Slippery Rock, Pennsylvania
- WTHA in Berlin, New Jersey
- WTRT in Benton, Kentucky
- WTSQ-LP in Charleston, West Virginia
- WTZI in Rosemont, Illinois
- WUBA in High Springs, Florida
- WUBJ in Jamestown, New York
- WUBK in Enoree, South Carolina
- WURC in Holly Springs, Mississippi
- WUTC in Chattanooga, Tennessee
- WUWF in Pensacola, Florida
- WVPE in Elkhart, Indiana
- WVRR in Point Pleasant, West Virginia
- WVVC-FM in Dolgeville, New York
- WVYC in York, Pennsylvania
- WWEN in Wentworth, Wisconsin
- WWER in Colonial Beach, Virginia
- WWFJ in East Fayetteville, North Carolina
- WWGV in Grove City, Ohio
- WWTG in Carpentersville, Illinois
- WXBA in Brentwood, New York
- WXLU in Peru, New York
- WXTC in Greenville, Pennsylvania
- WYCE in Wyoming, Michigan
- WYFY in Cambridge, Ohio
- WYGG in Asbury Park, New Jersey
- WYPF in Frederick, Maryland
- WYPR in Baltimore, Maryland
- WYSP in Dushore, Pennsylvania
- WYTR in Robbins, North Carolina
- WZBL in Barnegat Light, New Jersey
- WZGL in Charleston, Illinois
- WZIP in Akron, Ohio
- WZUM-FM in Bethany, West Virginia
- WZXM in Harrisburg, Pennsylvania
- WZZD in Warwick, Pennsylvania
