= WHOV =

Radio station in Hampton, Virginia

- Hampton, Virginia; United States
- Broadcast area: Hampton Roads
- Frequency: 88.1 MHz
- Branding: Smooth 88.1 WHOV

Programming
- Format: Jazz, gospel, urban contemporary

Ownership
- Owner: Hampton University

History
- First air date: March 5, 1964
- Former frequencies: 88.3 MHz (1964–1992)
- Call sign meaning: Hampton's Own Voice

Technical information
- Licensing authority: FCC
- Facility ID: 25952
- Class: B1
- ERP: 2,000 watts horizontal; 8,000 watts vertical
- HAAT: 59 m (194 ft)
- Transmitter coordinates: 37°1′2.0″N 76°20′12.9″W

Links
- Public license information: Public file; LMS
- Webcast: Listen live (via iHeartRadio)
- Website: home.hamptonu.edu/whov/

WHOV is the radio station of Hampton University in Hampton, Virginia, United States. It broadcasts jazz, gospel, and R&B music to the Hampton Roads area from its studios in the Scripps Howard School of Journalism and Communication and transmitter located separately on the Hampton University campus.

The history of radio at what was then the Hampton Institute began with the 1941 establishment of a carrier current station, which by 1950 was known as WHOV. The station became a broadcast FM service in 1964 and over the years increased its broadcast power to cover most of Hampton Roads. It serves as a training ground for students.

== History ==
In 1941, the Hampton Institute established a carrier current station audible in campus dormitories to support students interested in broadcasting. By 1950, the station was known as WHOV—"Hampton's Own Voice"—and providing regular programming.

The Institute filed on November 8, 1962, to build a new non-commercial FM station at 88.3 MHz in conjunction with a new communications building; the Federal Communications Commission (FCC) granted the construction permit on April 9, 1963. The communications building was dedicated in February 1964, and WHOV began broadcasting on March 5 or March 16, 1964. It originally operated for six hours a day, five days a week, with blocks of educational programming.

By 1977, WHOV was operating for seven hours each weekday and twelve hours daily on weekends, offering listeners jazz, soul, and rock music. One reason that hours had been limited was the regular theft of albums and equipment from the studio. The station applied in 1979 to raise its effective radiated power from 10 to 1,250 watts; the station made the switch by 1982 and, to meet FCC regulations, planned to its weekday broadcasting to 12 hours. It added its first Spanish-language programming in 1980, which grew from one 30-minute show to six hours a week by 1992 and 10 1/2 hours by 1996.

WHOV was reformatted in 1984 to emphasize jazz music; station manager Evonne Whitmore described the new music policy as "more jazz, less rhythm and blues and no punk, funk and rappin' music". This emphasis persisted for years; in 1991, a sign in the studio warned student DJs, "R&B Announcers: Do Not Play More than 3 Rap Songs Per Hour" on penalty of immediate termination. Later that year, the station was off the air for two months and on reduced power for another two after a dump truck snared one of the tower's guy wires, causing it to collapse. During that time, Hampton Institute renamed itself Hampton University (HU) to reflect its expanded graduate offerings. By the late 1980s, WHOV aired specialty programs featuring Hispanic and Caribbean music on weekends in addition to its primary format of jazz music.

In 1988, Hampton University began planning to increase the power of WHOV to as much as 20,000 watts, which would relocate the station to 88.1 MHz and add Virginia Beach to the coverage area. The move became entangled in several other frequency changes and power increases among noncommercial radio stations in Hampton Roads. The insertion of the new WHRO-FM 90.3 led to the relocation of WFOS to 88.7 MHz, which in turn caused issues for reception of WJLZ. That led the FCC to hold off on permitting the upgrade to WHOV, which took effect on July 1, 1992.

WHOV affiliated with ABC Radio Networks in 2000. The affiliation was seen as giving the station prestige and allowed the station to air the nationally syndicated Doug Banks Morning Show, aimed at urban contemporary stations, in morning drive. In 2002, Hampton University opened a new communications school, replacing the media arts department, and a new communications building funded by the Scripps Howard Foundation, which included studios for WHOV radio as well as television studios.

Hurricane Isabel in 2003 resulted in substantial damage to the transmitter facility. In the wake of Isabel, WHOV received new equipment and became a 24-hour operation.

== Notable alumni ==
- DJ Babey Drew
- Spencer Christian
