= WHRO =

WHRO may refer to:

- WHRO-TV, a television station (channel 31, virtual 15) licensed to serve Hampton-Norfolk, Virginia, United States
- WHRO-FM, broadcasting at 90.3 MHz on the FM band, featuring classical music and fine arts programming in Norfolk, VA
- WHRV-FM, broadcasting at 89.5 MHz on the FM band, featuring NPR programming (this same frequency previously broadcast under the name WHRO, serving NPR content) in Norfolk, VA
