= WKAO =

- Ashland, Kentucky; United States
- Broadcast area: Huntington–Ashland metropolitan area
- Frequency: 91.1 MHz
- Branding: Walk FM

Programming
- Format: Christian adult contemporary

Ownership
- Owner: Positive Alternative Radio, Incorporated
- Sister stations: WPJW, WPJY, WVRR, WYMW

Technical information
- Licensing authority: FCC
- Facility ID: 81315
- Class: B1
- ERP: 7,000 watts
- HAAT: 108 meters (354 ft)
- Transmitter coordinates: 38°25′11″N 82°24′06″W
- Repeater: 99.3 W257EK (Charleston, West Virginia)

Links
- Public license information: Public file; LMS
- Webcast: Listen live
- Website: walkfm.org

WKAO (91.1 FM) is a Christian Adult Contemporary–formatted radio station licensed in Ashland, Kentucky, United States, and serving the greater Huntington–Ashland metropolitan area. The station is owned by Positive Alternative Radio and maintains studios on Lester Lane in Cannonsburg, Kentucky. WKAO's transmitter facilities are located next to Rotary Park in eastern Huntington, West Virginia. WKAO and the Walk FM franchise are relayed across four full-power FM stations, one FM translator, and one AM station.
