= WFOS =

- Chesapeake, Virginia; United States
- Broadcast area: Southside of Hampton Roads
- Frequency: 88.7 MHz
- Branding: The Time Machine Radio Network

Programming
- Format: Oldies, Motown and adult standards

Ownership
- Owner: Hampton Roads Educational Telecommunications Association
- Sister stations: WHRO-FM, WHRO-TV, WHRV

History
- First air date: May 2, 1955
- Former frequencies: 90.5 MHz (1955–1983); 90.3 MHz (1983–1990)
- Call sign meaning: Oscar Smith High School (previous owner)

Technical information
- Licensing authority: FCC
- Facility ID: 10757
- Class: B1
- ERP: 15,500 watts
- HAAT: 48 meters (157 ft)
- Transmitter coordinates: 36°43′18.0″N 76°18′3.0″W

Links
- Public license information: Public file; LMS
- Webcast: Listen live
- Website: timemachineradio.org

WFOS (88.7 FM) is a non-commercial radio station licensed to Chesapeake, Virginia, United States, and serving the Southside of Hampton Roads. WFOS is owned by Hampton Roads Educational Telecommunications Association alongside WHRO-TV (channel 15), classical music outlet WHRO-FM and NPR member WHRV. WFOS's format includes a mixture of oldies, Motown and adult standards branded as "Time Machine Radio".

The transmitter is on Elementary Road in Chesapeake, on property owned by the local school district.

== History ==
=== Oscar Smith High School ===
WFOS signed on the air on May 2, 1955. The original frequency was 90.3 MHz. It was powered at only 10-watts and was based at the old Oscar Smith High School in South Norfolk. WFOS started with the help of the widow of the school's namesake, who made a donation to pay for an antenna bought from a station in Florida. She also helped purchase other radio equipment. The school wanted the station's call sign to be WOFS, for Oscar Frommel Smith, but those call letters were already taken. They settled for WFOS. The F stands for FM radio and the OS are Oscar Smith's initials. The station would allow students to learn the ins and outs of radio and see if they were interested in broadcasting as a career.

The City of South Norfolk merged with Norfolk County to form the City of Chesapeake in 1963, resulting in the present city of license. At the same time, Chesapeake Public Schools replaced the South Norfolk school board as the licensee.

Students of Chesapeake Public Schools were put on the air to run hour-long shows or to read news or sports. The station sent students to cover local political contests, even sending a contingent to Richmond to cover state elections.

=== Moving to 88.7 MHz ===
In October 1990, WFOS moved from 90.3 MHz to 88.7 MHz to accommodate the relocation of WHRO-FM. At the same time, it had to provide some protection to 88.5 FM in Virginia Beach.

This was one leg of a three-part frequency and license shuffle that took years to come to fruition, in which WHRO-FM moved to 90.3 on WFOS's old license. The prior WHRO-FM became WHRV; and WFOS moved to what had been the frequency of the silent WNHS at I. C. Norcom High School in Portsmouth. WNHS launched on September 14, 1973. But low student interest a decade later prompted the school district to discontinue broadcasting. The shuffling was made because the 90.3 frequency could be used at higher power than 89.5 or 88.7. WHRO bought the transmitter WFOS used on 88.7.

In the late 1990s, WFOS increased its power to 15,500 watts. Eight DJs were on rotation during the week, playing music throughout the day. As a non-commercial station, WFOS airs no advertisements.

=== Sale to HRETA ===
In 2015, Chesapeake Public Schools decided to stop offering a radio program to students. Advancements in technology had made music more accessible to the public in other formats. Fewer students were seeking jobs in local radio, making it less vital for Chesapeake Public Schools to train students in the field. At the time, students interested in communications or audio engineering could still get credit and experience in radio production.

In November 2020, WFOS attempted a fundraiser plan, posting on its Twitter account that it was aiming to become listener-funded. By fall, it had raised 15% of a $40,000 goal. The station had a lengthy list of needed repairs, totaling about $150,000 on top of the $200,000 a year it cost to run it.

Chesapeake Public Schools and the Hampton Roads Educational Telecommunications Authority, which already owned WHRO-FM 90.3 and WHRV 89.5, began talks. On January 27, 2021, they reached a programming and services agreement to allow for the operations of the station to continue. Two months later, HRETA filed with the FCC to buy WFOS outright.

=== Time Machine Radio Network ===
HRETA took over ownership of the station on May 1, 2021, but was required to wait for the Federal Communications Commission (FCC) to give its OK to fully operate the station. The FCC gave final approval in June 2021. The station began calling itself The Time Machine Radio Network. Its signal was expanded to cover Norfolk, Virginia Beach and Chesapeake. Additionally, listeners can stream it online at whro.org/timemachine.

HRETA announced that two popular WFOS personalities were returning to host their own shows. Larry Williams, known for Larry’s Doo Wop and Larry’s Beach Party, played beach music, and Jerry Carter, known for his show Blues Traffic Jam, hosted a blues show. WHRV host Paul Shugrue, known for his program Out of the Box, took on the role of music coordinator for the station and hosts an oldies show.

Time Machine Radio Network seeks to transport listeners to their favorite moments in time through music. Listeners find a mix of tunes from the 1950s through the ‘80s, including Doo Wop, Motown music, Oldies, Classic R&B and Adult Standards, all without commercials.
