= WCRX =

WCRX may refer to:

- WCRX (FM), a radio station (88.1 FM) licensed to serve Chicago, Illinois, United States
- WCRX-LP, a defunct radio station (102.1 FM) formerly licensed to serve Columbus, Ohio, United States
