= WHRF =

Radio station in Belle Haven, Virginia

Simulcast of WHRO-FM
- Belle Haven, Virginia; United States
- Broadcast area: Accomac, Virginia; Accomack County, Virginia
- Frequency: 98.3 MHz (HD Radio)
- Branding: WHRO-FM

Programming
- Format: Public radio; classical music
- Affiliations: American Public Radio; NPR; Public Radio International

Ownership
- Owner: Hampton Roads Educational Telecommunications Association, Inc.
- Sister stations: WHRE, WHRG, WHRJ, WHRL, WHRO-FM, WHRO-TV, WHRV, WHRX

History
- First air date: 2010; 16 years ago
- Call sign meaning: Hampton Roads F

Technical information
- Licensing authority: FCC
- Facility ID: 181073
- Class: A
- Power: 6,000 watts
- HAAT: 72.9 meters (239 ft)
- Transmitter coordinates: 37°40′38.0″N 75°43′37.0″W

Links
- Public license information: Public file; LMS
- Webcast: Listen Live
- Website: WHRF Online

WHRF (98.3 FM) is a public radio-formatted broadcast radio station licensed to Belle Haven, Virginia, serving Accomac and Accomack County, Virginia. WHRF is owned and operated by Hampton Roads Educational Telecommunications Association, Inc. and is a repeater station of WHRO-FM.
