= KGIF =

KGIF may refer to:

- KGIF (FM), a radio station (88.1 FM) licensed to serve Tafuna, American Samoa
- Winter Haven's Gilbert Airport (ICAO code KGIF)
- Portable broadcasting stations in the United States: call sign of Nebraska portable AM radio station licensed to Robert B. Howell, 1928-1929.
