= XHDZ-FM =

Radio station in Córdoba, Veracruz, Mexico

Defunct
- Córdoba, Veracruz; Mexico
- Frequency: 88.1 FM

Ownership
- Owner: Atomium Media; (Radiodifusoras Eles, S.A.)
- Operator: Grupo Audiorama Comunicaciones

History
- First air date: September 17, 1951
- Last air date: October, 1, 2026
- Former call signs: XEDZ-AM
- Former frequencies: 580 AM
- Call sign meaning: Diodoro Zúñiga, husband of the founding owner

Technical information
- Class: B
- ERP: 10 kW
- Transmitter coordinates: 18°54′27″N 96°58′27″W

XHDZ-FM is a radio station on 88.1 FM in Córdoba, Veracruz, Mexico. currently silent. The station is owned by Atomium Media, It is operated by Grupo Audiorama Comunicaciones

== History ==
Logo used as Retro FM until 2016

XEDZ-AM 580 received its concession on September 17, 1951. It was owned by Juana María Jácome Vda. de Zuñiga and broadcast with 1,000 watts day and 450 night. The current concessionaire acquired it in 1964.

XEDZ moved to FM in 2012.

In August 2019, Grupo Radiorama became the operator of XHDZ. The station changed from pop "Hit 88.1" to Audiorama's Retro FM brand carries a spanish and english, romantic, pop and adult contemporary getting adult public only 25 and 50 years-old.

In October, 1, 2026 Retro FM 88.1 since 7 years, XHDZ off air during 75 years in 2026.
