= WJJJ (disambiguation) =

WJJJ is a radio station (88.1 FM) licensed to Beckley, West Virginia, United States. It may also refer to the following broadcasting stations in the United States:

- WWVT, a radio station (1260 AM) licensed to Christiansburg, Virginia, which held the call sign WJJJ from 1966 to 1995
- WPGB, a radio station (104.7 FM) licensed to Pittsburgh, Pennsylvania, which held the call sign WJJJ from 1996 to 2004
- WHJB, a radio station (107.1 FM) licensed to Greensburg, Pennsylvania, which held the call sign WJJJ from 2004 to 2006
