= WHRX =

Simulcast of WHRV
- Nassawadox, Virginia; United States
- Broadcast area: Accomac, Virginia; Accomack County, Virginia
- Frequency: 90.1 MHz (HD Radio)
- Branding: WHRV

Programming
- Format: Public radio
- Affiliations: American Public Media; NPR; Public Radio Exchange

Ownership
- Owner: Hampton Roads Educational Telecommunications Association, Inc.
- Sister stations: WHRE, WHRF, WHRG, WHRJ, WHRL, WHRO-FM, WHRO-TV, WHRV

History
- First air date: 2005
- Former call signs: WJCN (2002–2010); WHRE (2010–2011); WHRJ (2011)
- Call sign meaning: Similar to WHRV

Technical information
- Licensing authority: FCC
- Facility ID: 91505
- Class: B
- ERP: 46,000 watts
- HAAT: 68 meters (223 ft)
- Transmitter coordinates: 37°40′38.0″N 75°43′37.0″W

Links
- Public license information: Public file; LMS
- Webcast: Listen live
- Website: www.whro.org/radio/

WHRX (90.1 FM) is a public radio formatted broadcast radio station licensed to Nassawadox, Virginia, serving Accomac and Accomack County, Virginia. WHRX is owned and operated by Hampton Roads Educational Telecommunications Association, Inc. and is a repeater station of WHRV.
