= KLFC =

KLFC may refer to:

- King's Lynn F.C., an English football club
- Kings Langley F.C., an English football club
- KLFC (FM), a radio station (88.1 FM) licensed to Branson, Missouri, United States
