= WCRM =

WCRM may refer to:

- WCRM-LP, a low-power radio station (102.1 FM) licensed to serve Columbus, Ohio, United States
- WZKO, a radio station (1350 AM) licensed to serve Fort Myers, Florida, United States, which held the call sign WCRM from 1989 to 2016
