= KSUT =

KSUT and KUTE

Ignacio, Colorado; United States
- Broadcast area: Four Corners region
- Frequencies: KSUT: 91.3 MHz; KUTE: 90.1 MHz
- Branding: KSUT-FM: Southern Ute Tribal Radio; KUTE-FM: Four Corners Public Radio

Programming
- Format: KSUT: Native American music and news; KUTE: Public radio
- Affiliations: NPR, APM, NativeVoice1

Ownership
- Owner: KSUT Public Radio; (KUTE, Inc.)

History
- First air date: KSUT: June 14, 1976; KUTE: June 1998
- Call sign meaning: KSUT: "Southern Ute Tribe"; KUTE: "Ute"

Technical information
- Licensing authority: FCC
- Facility ID: KSUT: 35816; KUTE: 82446
- Class: KSUT: C2; KUTE: C1
- ERP: KSUT: 2,000 watts; KUTE: 3,000 watts
- HAAT: KSUT: 497 meters (1,631 ft); KUTE: 599 meters (1,965 ft)
- Transmitter coordinates: KSUT: 37°11′3″N 107°29′6″W; KUTE: 37°21′51″N 107°46′56″W

Links
- Public license information: KSUT: Public file; LMS; KUTE: Public file; LMS
- Webcast: KSUT: Listen live; KUTE: Listen live
- Website: ksut.org

KSUT originally signed on as a non-commercial community radio station licensed to serve the community of Ignacio, Colorado. The station has since expanded to two distinct formats, Four Corners Public Radio, with a public radio format of NPR and music programming, and Southern Ute Tribal Radio, which airs Native American music and news. While the stations have different legal call letters, both stations still refer to themselves on-air, online, and in marketing as KSUT. The stations are owned by KSUT Public Radio, a non-profit corporation, and licensed to KUTE, Inc.

== History ==
On May 7, 1975, this station received its original construction permit from the Federal Communications Commission and was assigned the call letters KSUT. Originally licensed as a 10 watt community radio station serving the Southern Ute Indian Reservation, KSUT began regular broadcasting in June 1976 with a mix of tribal news and personal messages for the residents of the reservation. At the time, it was one of only eight Native American radio stations operating in the United States.

A May 1979 relocation of the broadcast transmitter and increase in signal strength allowed KSUT to begin serving the larger surrounding community as well. In 1984, the station joined NPR, adding All Things Considered, Morning Edition, and other programming sources, in order to broaden the appeal of the station beyond Native news and cultural programming. Four Corners Public Radio, as it came to be known, added several affiliates and broadcast translators to serve the greater Four Corners region.

The station adopted a daily music format called the Music Blend that focused on Americana, rock, folk, bluegrass, jazz, blues, world and other genres. Four Corners Public Radio also added more conventional public radio shows like Fresh Air and A Prairie Home Companion.

KSUT split its program stream into two stations, and two sets of similar call letters, in June, 1998. KUTE-FM assumed the Four Corners Public Radio format, serving a larger regional audience with NPR programming and varied music. KSUT-FM, now branded as Southern Ute Tribal Radio, returned to its original mission of serving the reservation and surrounding area with Native American programming.

== Programming ==
KUTE-FM, known as Four Corners Public Radio, airs a daily adult album alternative music format known as the Music Blend, as well as NPR and other public radio programming such as Morning Edition, Fresh Air, Wait Wait Don't Tell Me!, and Radiolab. In addition to the Music Blends, locally-produced programming on Four Corners Public Radio includes evening blues, alternative country, Celtic, world and bluegrass shows. KSUT-FM, known as Southern Ute Tribal Radio, airs programming from Native Voice 1. KSUT Tribal Radio airs locally-produced Native American programming in the mornings, mid-days, and some evening hours. Local programming includes the Tribal Radio Morning Show, Native America Calling, and Sounds of the Dreamcatcher.

== Honors and awards ==
In November 1999, KSUT Four Corners Public Radio took top honors in the "Special Projects" category by the El Pomar Foundation for its annual Awards for Excellence. Based in Colorado Springs, the El Pomar Foundation is the state of Colorado's largest private foundation and funds numerous programs throughout the state.

The station also received top honors for 2007 in the areas of community service campaign, best news feature report, and best sales promotion for an advertiser. KSUT was chosen as the Best Radio Station in Durango in the Durango Herald's Reader's Polls 2013 - 2022.

== Broadcast network ==
KSUT, Southern Ute Tribal Radio is heard on 91.3 FM (2,000 watts) on Southern Ute Tribal lands, Ignacio, and Bayfield. The station is rebroadcast in Farmington, N.M. on KUUT, at 89.7 FM (1,350 watts).

Four Corners Public Radio is heard on the following stations:

- KUTE 90.1 FM (3,000 watts) in Ignacio, Colorado
- KDNG 89.3 FM (200 watts) in Durango, Colorado
- KUSW 88.1 FM (4,100 watts) in Farmington, New Mexico
- KPGS 88.1 FM (1,000 watts) in Pagosa Springs, Colorado

Four Corners Public Radio is also heard on the following translators:

- K216GF 91.1 FM Silverton, CO (45 watts)
- K287AC 106.3 FM Farmington, NM (41 watts)

== See also ==
- List of community radio stations in the United States
