= Cynthia Cozette Lee =

American classical composer (born 1953)

- Born: October 19, 1953 (age 72); Pittsburgh, Pennsylvania
- Other names: Nazik Cynthia Cozette; Cynthia Cozette
- Education: Jacksonville University, Carnegie Mellon University, University of Pennsylvania, Rutgers University, Rowan University, The Juilliard School
- Occupation: American composer

Cynthia Cozette Lee, also known as Cynthia Cozette or Nazik Cynthia Cozette (born October 19, 1953, in Pittsburgh, Pennsylvania) is a contemporary African-American classical music composer and librettist. Cozette was the first African-American woman to graduate from the University of Pennsylvania with a Master of Arts degree in music composition. Cozette was also the first African-American woman graduate of the University of Pennsylvania to be instructed in music composition by the American composers, George Crumb and George Rochberg.

== Early life and education ==
Cynthia Cozette Lee is the great-granddaughter of Warren Garner, an African slave who fought during the American Civil War in the 4th Regiment Infantry of the United States Colored Troops.

She began her formal music training at 8 years old by studying piano with Carmen Rummo, a Duquesne University professor. She began studying flute at 10 years old. Her early flute teachers were Alois Hrabak, a former flutist with the Pittsburgh Symphony Orchestra, and Bernard Goldberg, the principal flutist of the Pittsburgh Symphony Orchestra. She received the Victor Saudek Flute Award in 1969 to study with Goldberg. She began her musical composition training at 16 years old with Joseph Willcox Jenkins, a Duquesne University music composition professor. Her prize for winning an honorable mention award in the Pittsburgh Flute Club Composition Contest in 1969 was to have composition lessons with Jenkins.

Cozette attended Jacksonville University from 1971 to 1973 and her music composition teachers included William Hoskins. She attended Carnegie Mellon University from 1973 to 1975. Cozette performed her senior recital in 1975 with Gary Chang, a fellow music composition student at Carnegie Mellon University. She graduated from Carnegie Mellon University in 1975 with a Bachelor of Fine Arts Degree in Music Composition. Her music composition teachers at Carnegie Mellon included Leonardo Balada and Roland Leich.

She attended the University of Pennsylvania and graduated in 1977 with a Master of Arts Degree in Music Composition from the university. Her music composition teachers at the University of Pennsylvania included George Crumb and George Rochberg. She studied music copying from 1977 to 1978 at the Juilliard School of Music with Arnold Arnstein, the personal music copyist to Leonard Bernstein, Gian Carlo Menotti and Samuel Barber. She received her Master of Public Administration Degree from Rutgers University in 2005. She received her doctorate degree in Educational Leadership from Rowan University in 2009.

== Music ==
From the beginning of her composing career Cozette's music style was influenced by the French impressionistic composers, Debussy and Ravel. Her music composition training directly stems from Eusebius Mandyczewski, a close friend and amanuensis of Johannes Brahms through her music composition instructors, Roland Leich and George Rochberg, both of whom were students of Rosario Scalero, a pupil of Mandyczewski.

Cozette’s Black heritage greatly influenced her music composition through her selection of music themes. Cozette completed two one act operas, Adea and The Black Guitar in 1982. However, had difficulty with obtaining publications of her works and recordings. Cozette started sketches on her opera based on the life of her great-grandfather who fought as a soldier in the Civil War and composed for voice, chamber music works and orchestra.

Cozette won national music awards for her compositions. Her Nigerian Treasures for Solo Unaccompanied Flute received a College Music Society Composition Award in 1985 and the work was premiered at the College Music Society Conference in Vancouver, British Columbia in November 1985. Her original music compositions have not been published. More than 45 of her vocal, instrumental and operatic works are registered with the Library of Congress through the United States Copyright Office including her collaboration with her sister, Hazel Ann Lee, on art songs, operas and two musicals, Secretaries and Slavery.

A world premiere of the voice and string orchestra performing Cozette’s art song, The Wake, from her Doctor’s Song Cycle occurred on April 15, 2023 in Paris, France. The Orchestre Symphonique du Loiret played under conductor Mehdi Lougraïda. The art song was performed by the finalists of the Afrique Lyrique Opera 2nd Competition.

== Productions ==
From 1982 to 1984, Cozette produced and hosted her own classical music radio interview program on WPEB Public Radio entitled Classical Reflections. Her radio program was a forum for African-American classical musicians in Philadelphia to discuss their life and works. She also promoted African-American classical musicians by being a classical music consultant for a weekly radio show called The Marketplace created by Joe Adams for WUHY PBS Radio station from 1976 to 1977 (WUHY is now called WHYY-FM). She produced and performed her one-woman show, Songs I Wrote For Broadway, in 2001 for the Women of Color Festival in New York.

== Writings ==
Cozette began writing poetry and fiction in 2000, as well as non-fiction essays.

- Lee, C.C. (2020). The Forgotten Schoolhouse: Original Poems and Stories on Faith, Love, Nature and Wonder. Covenant Books, Inc.
- Lee. C.C. (2014). Native American Music and Living Legends. Teachers Institute of Philadelphia.
- Lee, C. (2010). D.O.O.R.S. of Change: Capacity Building to Differentiated Instruction. Dissertation Published by ProQuest.
- Lee, C. (November, 2000). Build a bias-free classroom. NJEA Review, 14-16.

== Selected works ==
=== Operas ===
Sources:

- ADEA Opera in One Act and Three Scenes
- The Black Guitar (La Guitarra Negra)
- Partway To Freedom

=== Orchestral ===
Sources:

- Ebony Reflections for chamber orchestra
- Concerto for piano and orchestra
- The Martyr for baritone and orchestra
- The Wake for solo voice (all ranges) and string orchestra

=== Chamber Music ===
- Nigerian Treasures for solo unaccompanied flute
- Pittsburgh Memoirs in 4 Movements for flute trio
- Rivers: An African Tribute in 3 movements for solo unaccompanied flute
- The Steps of the Art Museum Three Poems for the piano
- Paris String Quartet
- Sweets for 4 Flutes in 3 Movements for flute quartet

=== Vocal/Choral ===
Sources:

- Colors for Women’s Chorus and Percussion Ensemble
- Las Canciones de Puerto Rico for SATB choir
- Make A Joyful Noise for SATB choir
- The Doctor’s Song Cycle for soprano, voice and piano

=== Musicals ===
- Secretaries
- Slavery Year 3000
- Songs I Wrote for Broadway, a Musical Review
