= HRO =

HRO may refer to:

- Boone County Airport (Arkansas), in Harrison, Arkansas, United States
- Harassment Restraining Order
- Haroi language, spoken in Vietnam
- Harold Wood railway station in London
- Harvard Radcliffe Orchestra in Cambridge, Massachusetts, United States
- High reliability organization
- Holme Roberts & Owen, an American law firm
- National HRO, a communications receiver

== See also ==
- WHRO (disambiguation)
