= Kpg =

Kpg, K-Pg or KPG may refer to:

- Korean Provisional Government, a Korean government-in-exile during the Japanese colonial rule of Korea
- Kapingamarangi language, ISO 639-3 language code kpg
- Kurdish Pride Gang, a gang in the United States
- Kiwi Property Group, a New Zealand company, stock ticker KPG
- Kopargaon railway station, in Ahmednagar district, Maharashtra, India, station code KPG
- Kupang LRT station, in Sengkang, Singapore, LRT station abbreviation KPG

== See also ==
- KPGS, a radio station
- Cretaceous–Paleogene extinction event, or K–Pg extinction event
- Cretaceous–Paleogene boundary, or K–Pg boundary, a geological signature
