= KPPP =

KPPP may refer to:

- WvDial, a Point-to-Point Protocol dialer
- KPPP-LP, a low-power radio station (88.1 FM) licensed to serve Fargo, North Dakota, United States
- KXPI-LD, a low-power television station (channel 34) licensed to serve Pocatello, Idaho, United States, which held the call sign KPPP-LP from 2006 to 2009
