= XHGIK-FM =

Radio station in Frontera–Monclova, Coahuila

XHGIK-FM / XEGIK-AM
- Ciudad Frontera, Coahuila; Mexico
- Broadcast area: Monclova, Coahuila
- Frequency: 88.1 FM / 560 AM
- Branding: La Acerera

Programming
- Format: Regional Mexican
- Affiliations: Radio Fórmula

Ownership
- Owner: Grupo Kamar; (Radio Estelar 920, S.A. de C.V.)

History
- First air date: November 1, 1964 (concession)
- Former call signs: XEOP-AM
- Former frequencies: 920 kHz; 106.3 MHz
- Call sign meaning: Grupo Industrial Kamar

Technical information
- Licensing authority: CRT
- Class: B1 (FM); B (AM)
- Power: 1,400 watts
- ERP: 5.45 kW
- HAAT: −44 m (−144 ft)
- Transmitter coordinates: 26°54′32″N 101°28′53″W

Links
- Webcast: Listen live
- Website: laacerera.mx

XHGIK-FM/XEGIK-AM is a radio station on 88.1 FM and 560 AM in Ciudad Frontera, Coahuila, primarily serving Monclova. It is owned by Grupo Kamar and affiliated to Radio Fórmula, and is known as La Acerera, which offers a Regional Mexican format.

== History ==
XEOP-AM 920 received its concession on November 1, 1961. Owned by Adip Apud Martínez, XEOP broadcast on 920 kHz with 250 watts. By the 1980s, control of XEOP had passed to Salvador Adip Abbud and three others in the same family.

In 1994, XEOP was sold to Radio Estelar 920, S.A. de C.V. after the 1992 consolidation of the station under Salvador Kamar Apud. Soon after, XEOP changed its callsign to XEGIK-AM, reflecting its new owners (Grupo Industrial Kamar), and increased its power to 1.4 kW on the new frequency of 560 kHz.

XEGIK migrated to FM in 2011, initially broadcasting on 106.3 MHz, but it was required to maintain its AM station, as communities could lose radio service were the AM station to go off the air. It was required to move to 88.1 MHz in 2017 as a condition of the renewal of its concession, in order to clear 106-108 MHz as much as possible for community and indigenous stations; the change became effective on April 2, 2018.
