= XHADM-FM =

Community radio station in Ahualulco de Mercado, Jalisco, Mexico

- Ahualulco de Mercado, Jalisco; Mexico
- Frequency: 88.1 FM
- Branding: Más FM

Programming
- Format: Community radio

Ownership
- Owner: Comunicación y Cultura Ahualulco de Mercado, A.C.

History
- First air date: May 2015 (with concession)
- Call sign meaning: Ahualulco De Mercado

Technical information
- Licensing authority: CRT
- Class: A
- ERP: 100 watts
- HAAT: −151.8 m (−498 ft)
- Transmitter coordinates: 20°42′04.39″N 103°58′30.65″W

XHADM-FM is a community radio station on 88.1 FM in Ahualulco de Mercado, Jalisco, Mexico. It is owned by Comunicación y Cultura Ahualulco de Mercado, A.C. and branded as Más FM.

== History ==
Más FM was among the first new stations to receive a social use concession under the terms of the 2014 telecommunications reforms, becoming XHADM-FM on the same frequency of 88.1.
