= XHÑUC-FM =

Community radio station in Chalcatongo de Hidalgo, Oaxaca, Mexico

Chalcatongo de Hidalgo, Oaxaca; Mexico
- Frequency: 88.1 FM
- Branding: La Favorita

Programming
- Format: Community radio

Ownership
- Owner: Ñucuaha, A.C.

History
- First air date: 2018
- Call sign meaning: ÑUCuaha, A.C.

Technical information
- Class: AA
- ERP: 6 kW

Links
- Website: lafavoritadechalca.com

XHÑUC-FM is a community radio station on 88.1 FM in Chalcatongo de Hidalgo, Oaxaca, Mexico. It is known as La Favorita and owned by the civil association Ñucuaha, A.C.

The station broadcasts community programming, including legal, medical and advice, as well as programming fostering indigenous values and languages and promoting local artists.

== History ==
Ñucuaha was approved for its concession on September 14, 2016, after applying in 2015. The station is the only one in Mexico with an Ñ in its callsign.
