= WIVH =

Radio station in Christiansted, U.S. Virgin Islands

Christiansted, U.S. Virgin Islands; United States
- Frequency: 89.9 MHz
- Branding: The Voice Of Hope

Programming
- Format: Religious

Ownership
- Owner: Good News for Life
- Sister stations: WRGN

History
- First air date: July 1993
- Former frequencies: 90.1 MHz
- Call sign meaning: West Indies Voice of Hope

Technical information
- Licensing authority: FCC
- Facility ID: 24686
- Class: A
- ERP: 1,400 Watts
- HAAT: 304 meters (997 ft)
- Transmitter coordinates: 17°45′21″N 64°47′56″W

Links
- Public license information: Public file; LMS
- Website: WIVH-FM Online

WIVH (89.9 FM) is a radio station licensed to serve Christiansted, U.S. Virgin Islands. The station is owned and operated by Good News for Life, and airs a religious format.

The station has been assigned its callsign by the Federal Communications Commission since February 28, 1992.
