= KOIA =

- Storm Lake, Iowa; United States
- Frequency: 88.1 MHz
- Branding: Siouxland Catholic Radio 88.1 FM

Programming
- Format: Catholic
- Affiliations: EWTN Radio

Ownership
- Owner: Saint Gabriel Communications, Ltd
- Sister stations: KFHC

Technical information
- Licensing authority: FCC
- Facility ID: 177197
- Class: C3
- ERP: 6,000 watts
- HAAT: 112.2 metres (368 ft)
- Transmitter coordinates: 42°40′6″N 94°59′35″W

Links
- Public license information: Public file; LMS
- Webcast: Listen Live
- Website: Official Website

KOIA (88.1 FM) is a radio station licensed to serve the community of Storm Lake, Iowa. The station is owned by Saint Gabriel Communications, Ltd, and airs a Catholic radio format.

The station was assigned the KOIA call letters by the Federal Communications Commission on February 6, 2009.
