= KCFY =

Radio station in Yuma, Arizona

- Yuma, Arizona; United States
- Broadcast area: Yuma, Arizona
- Frequency: 88.1 MHz

Programming
- Format: Christian hot AC

Ownership
- Owner: Relevant Media, Inc.

History
- First air date: 1992

Technical information
- Licensing authority: FCC
- Facility ID: 70454
- Class: A
- ERP: 3,000 watts
- HAAT: 73 m (240 ft)
- Transmitter coordinates: 32°38′31″N 114°33′34″W

Links
- Public license information: Public file; LMS
- Website: kcfyfm.com

KCFY (88.1 FM) is a radio station broadcasting a Christian hot AC format. Licensed to Yuma, Arizona, United States, it serves the Yuma area. The station is currently owned by Relevant Media, Inc..
