= WZKO =

Radio station in Fort Myers, Florida

- Fort Myers, Florida; United States
- Frequency: 1350 kHz
- Branding: 107.5 Jamz

Programming
- Format: Urban adult contemporary

Ownership
- Owner: Aaron Howard; (Genesis Multimedia Group, LLC)

History
- First air date: August 22, 1964
- Former call signs: WXYC (1960–1964, CP); WCAI (1964–1986); WWWQ (1986–1988); WHYS (1988–1989); WCRM (1989–2016)

Technical information
- Licensing authority: FCC
- Facility ID: 39798
- Class: D
- Power: 2,000 watts day; 150 watts night
- Transmitter coordinates: 26°37′31″N 81°50′29″W
- Translator: 107.5 W298CB (Fort Myers)

Links
- Public license information: Public file; LMS
- Webcast: Listen Live
- Website: 1075jamz.fm

WZKO (1350 AM) is a radio station licensed to Fort Myers, Florida, United States. It airs an urban adult contemporary format branded as "107.5 Jamz".

== FM Translator ==
Broadcast translator for WZKO
Call sign	Frequency	City of license	FID	ERP (W)	Class	FCC info
W298CB	107.5 FM	Fort Myers, Florida	150277	99	D	LMS

== History ==
=== WCAI ===
On August 14, 1962, William H. Martin received the construction permit to establish a new radio station in Fort Myers, with the call letters WXYC. Martin sold the construction permit prior to going on air to Lee Broadcasting, which changed the call letters to WCAI before signing on August 22, 1964. The new daytime-only outlet broadcast middle-of-the-road music. Operations were threatened in 1967 when a city controlled burn operation went out of control and blew toward the station; WCAI remained on the air, but its tower, which had just been painted red that day, was colored black with ash.

WCAI remained mostly unchanged through the 1970s aside from a format flip to country, though it gave its listeners a scare when a 1977 promotion announcing "the end of the station" for a weekend of classic country prompted so many phone calls that a telephone exchange was blown out. The next year, a disc jockey resigned after being implicated in a company that sold memberships in nonexistent department stores. There were several transfers of ownership in 1980 and 1981, resulting in the station being sold to Ercona South for $600,000. The principals of Lee Broadcasting had sold WCAI in order to pursue a new FM license on Estero Island, which they won and launched in 1983 as WQEZ. By 1984, WCAI was a talk station.

In 1985, Charlie Frank reached an agreement to sell WCAI to Horizon Communications, which owned WQSA of Sarasota, for $700,000, with Horizon announcing plans to retain WCAI's talk programming. However, ratings surveys showed it dead last in the Fort Myers market of 12 stations, and in September, employee paychecks started bouncing as payment complications emerged in the sale to Horizon. The wheels came off in November, two weeks after former owners Truman Morris and Helen Pierce foreclosed on Horizon, when WCAI went silent while it searched for another new owner.

Nine days after receiving authority to cease broadcasting from the Federal Communications Commission, WCAI filed for Chapter 7 bankruptcy liquidation. One prospective bidder was Caloosa Television, which owned WEVU-TV in Naples. The only bid for WCAI, at $51,000, ultimately came from Roger Coleman, owner of a station in Galesburg, Illinois, after Caloosa withdrew its bid. However, Coleman backed out and withdrew his application with the FCC to buy WCAI in April. Other parties that showed interest in WCAI included a local pastor, Eddie Grimsley, who wanted to broadcast religious programming. After the license was transferred to WCAI's former creditors, Asti Broadcasting Corporation of Clearwater acquired WCAI for $400,000 late in the year.

=== WWWQ and WHYS ===
To get their own identity in the market, Asti changed the call letters to WWWQ. The station reemerged on March 15, 1987, as "3WQ" with an urban contemporary format—the only one in southwest Florida—primarily syndicated from the Satellite Music Network. Only a year later, however, 1350 AM returned to talk, this time as WHYS, because it struggled to overcome its image as a "black" radio station with white listeners and advertisers.

=== WCRM ===
In 1989, Asti sold WHYS to Manna Christian Missions, which had brokered out 34 hours a week on the station for Spanish-language programming, for $450,000. Manna changed WHYS to WCRM "Radio Consolación", the first Spanish-language radio station in Lee County. Yet again, however, the minority-oriented format proved problematic for potential advertisers, prompting Manna to flip WCRM to contemporary Christian in July 1990. (One of the hosts on the new station was Eddie Grimsley, the same pastor that had attempted to buy it out of bankruptcy four years prior.) Less than two years later, WCRM flipped back to a Spanish-language format as "Radio Manantial".

WCRM remained a Spanish-language Christian station, with some brokered programming and gospel music on Sundays, under Manna's ownership; it gained national recognition when it was named among the top 5 Spanish Christian radio stations in the United States in 1996. It suffered through a 1997 burglary in which $9,000 worth of equipment was taken or destroyed, as well as a 2000 lightning strike that took out its transmitter site.

In 2008, Manna sold WCRM to Vida Radio Ministries, a subsidiary of Christ Center International, for $950,000. Three years later, however, Manna bought back the land on which WCRM's studios and transmitter are located from Christ Center for $50,000 in a foreclosure sale; in early 2012, it won back the license in a settlement of Manna's claims against CCI.

While Manna took back the WCRM license, it decided to outsource the station's operations under a local marketing agreement. In late July 2012, Everglades City Broadcasting, owners of WBGY (88.1 FM) on Marco Island, began operating WCRM and flipped it to Fox Sports Radio.

=== WZKO ===
In December 2015, Manna sold WCRM to Genesis Multimedia for $450,000. Genesis paired the station with a translator it bought in Melbourne and moved to Fort Myers as W298CB (107.5 FM), and relaunched WCRM as WZKO "107.5 Jamz".
