= WSRC (FM) =

Coordinates: 40°9′0″N 86°54′14″W

- Waynetown, Indiana; United States
- Broadcast area: West-Central Indiana
- Frequency: 88.1 MHz
- Branding: The Source

Programming
- Format: Christian Radio

Ownership
- Owner: Calvary Chapel of Crawfordsville, Inc.

Technical information
- Licensing authority: FCC
- Facility ID: 92984
- Class: B1
- ERP: 17,000 watts
- HAAT: 119 meters (390 ft)

Links
- Public license information: Public file; LMS
- Website: 881TheSource.org

WSRC (88.1 MHz) is a non-commercial FM radio station licensed to Waynetown, Indiana. It is owned by the Calvary Chapel of Crawfordsville, Inc. The station airs a radio format consisting of Christian talk and teaching and Christian music.

WSRC calls itself "The Source." Some of the national religious leaders heard on the station include David Jeremiah, Chuck Swindoll and J. Vernon McGee.
