= WYGG =

- Asbury Park, New Jersey; United States
- Frequency: 88.1 MHz
- Branding: Good News Radio 88.1

Programming
- Format: Christian radio

Ownership
- Owner: Minority Business & Housing Development, Inc.

History
- First air date: 1994

Technical information
- Licensing authority: FCC
- Facility ID: 19867
- Class: A
- ERP: 920 watts
- HAAT: 34 meters
- Transmitter coordinates: 40°13′01″N 74°00′33″W

Links
- Public license information: Public file; LMS
- Webcast: Listen Live
- Website: goodnewsradiotv.com

WYGG (88.1 FM) is a radio station licensed to Asbury Park, New Jersey. The station is owned by Minority Business & Housing Development, Inc. It airs a Christian radio format known as Good News Radio.

The station was assigned the WYGG call letters by the Federal Communications Commission on March 4, 1994.

== Programming ==
WYGG serves the Haitian-American community of Asbury Park and the greater New York City area with religious, community involvement, and information programming. The station broadcasts in French, English, and Creole.

Journalist Maureen Nevin created and has hosted a weekly public affairs talk show called "Asbury Radio — The Radio Voice of Asbury Park" for more than six years, during which time the show reported on the redevelopment of the city's waterfront. In November 2006, the FCC ordered the 100-watt station off the air for radiation signing violations it cited in a December 20, 2007, letter, and fined the station $25,000. The station resumed in February 2007 and gained approval to broadcast at 1500 watts. However, Asbury Radio did not return to the air.

== Ownership ==
In December 1998, Minority Business and Housing Development Inc. (Abner Louima, president), reached an agreement to purchase WYGG from Evangelical Crusade of Fishers of Men, Inc., for $1. United Press International characterized this as "a financial formality for what amounts to a gift." The FCC approved the transfer to MBHD in May 2000.
