= Blennerhassett, West Virginia =

- CDP
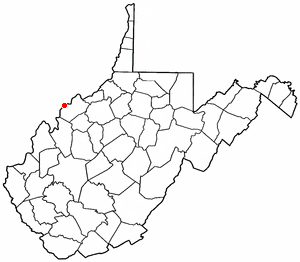
- Location of Blennerhassett, West Virginia
- Coordinates: 39°15′15″N 81°37′25″W
- Country: United States
- State: West Virginia
- County: Wood

Area
  - Total: 5.0 sq mi (13.0 km^{2})
  - Land: 5.0 sq mi (13.0 km^{2})
  - Water: 0 sq mi (0.0 km^{2})
- Elevation: 686 ft (209 m)

Population (2020)
  - Total: 3,118
  - Density: 621/sq mi (240/km^{2})
- Time zone: UTC-5 (Eastern (EST))
  - Summer (DST): UTC-4 (EDT)
- Area code: 304
- FIPS code: 54-08308
- GNIS feature ID: 2389216

Blennerhassett is a census-designated place (CDP) in Wood County, West Virginia, United States. It is part of the Parkersburg-Marietta-Vienna, WV-OH Metropolitan Statistical Area. The population was 3,118 at the 2020 census.

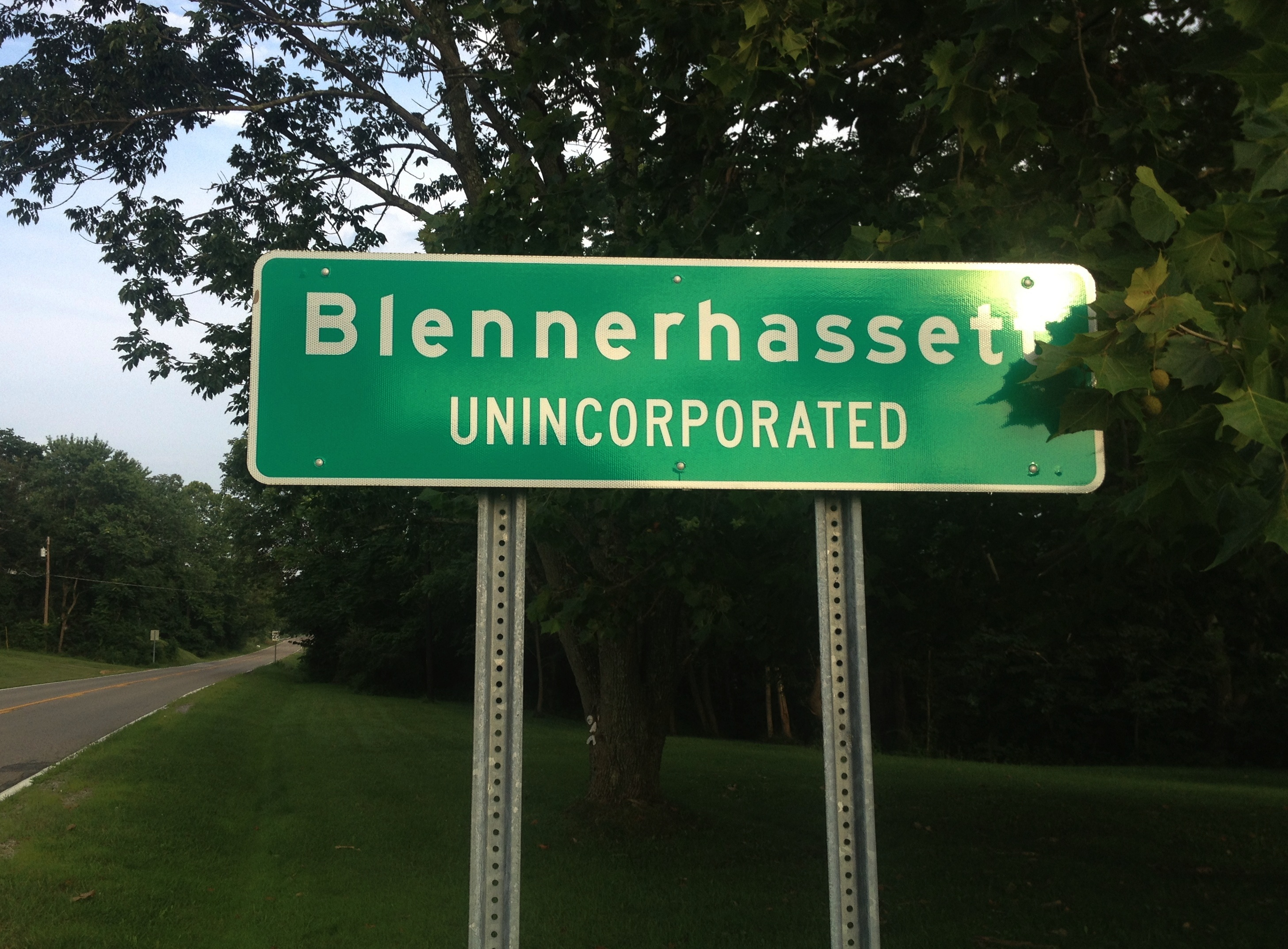
Blennerhassett, WV.

== History ==
This community is named after Blennerhassett Island, an island in the Ohio River near the area. The island's name originated from the owner of the island in the 19th century: Harman Blennerhassett, an Anglo-Irish immigrant to the United States.

== Geography ==
According to the United States Census Bureau, the CDP has a total area of 5.0 square miles (13.0 km^{2}), all land.

== Demographics ==
Historical population
Census	Pop.	Note	%±
2000	3,225		—
2010	3,089		−4.2%
2020	3,118		0.9%
U.S. Decennial Census

At the 2000 census, there were 3,225 people, 1,227 households and 996 families living in the CDP. The population density was 643.8 per square mile (248.5/km^{2}). There were 1,271 housing units at an average density of 253.7/sq mi (98.0/km^{2}). The racial makeup of the CDP was 98.45% White, 0.56% African American, 0.03% Native American, 0.50% Asian, and 0.47% from two or more races. Hispanic or Latino of any race were 0.37% of the population.

There were 1,227 households, of which 32.8% had children under the age of 18 living with them, 72.2% were married couples living together, 5.9% had a female householder with no husband present, and 18.8% were non-families. 16.9% of all households were made up of individuals, and 5.8% had someone living alone who was 65 years of age or older. The average household size was 2.61 and the average family size was 2.91.

Age distribution was 24.1% under the age of 18, 5.9% from 18 to 24, 27.2% from 25 to 44, 29.8% from 45 to 64, and 13.0% who were 65 years of age or older. The median age was 41 years. For every 100 females there were 99.8 males. For every 100 females age 18 and over, there were 98.9 males.

The median household income was $51,250, and the median family income was $56,513. Males had a median income of $45,478 versus $25,156 for females. The per capita income for the CDP was $22,485. About 1.8% of families and 2.2% of the population were below the poverty line, including 2.1% of those under age 18 and 1.2% of those age 65 or over.
