= KECG =

Radio station at El Cerrito High School in El Cerrito, California

- El Cerrito, California; United States
- Broadcast area: San Francisco Bay Area
- Frequency: 88.1 MHz

Programming
- Format: Free-form radio
- Affiliations: National Federation of Community Broadcasters

Ownership
- Owner: (West Contra Costa Unified School District)

History
- First air date: September 1978
- Call sign meaning: El Cerrito Gauchos

Technical information
- Licensing authority: FCC
- Facility ID: 19081
- Class: D
- ERP: 17 watts
- HAAT: −29 meters (−95 ft)
- Transmitter coordinates: 37°54′20″N 122°17′34″W
- Translator: 97.7 K249DJ (San Pablo)

Links
- Public license information: Public file; LMS
- Website: wccusd.net/domain/4196

KECG (88.1 FM) is a noncommercial radio station licensed to El Cerrito, California, United States, broadcasting a free-form radio variety format. Licensed to West Contra Costa Unified School District, the station is operated by the district and broadcasts from El Cerrito High School.

KECG was off the air for most of 2025 as the result of a campus power outage. The station was scheduled to resume broadcasting in early 2026.

== Translators ==
In addition to the main transmitter on 88.1, KECG is relayed by translator K249DJ on 97.7 FM, which widened its broadcast area. This translator was originally licensed in 1994 at 89.9 FM, but the frequency was changed due to a dispute with Howell Mountain Broadcasting, licensee of what was then KNDL 89.9 FM, in Angwin.

Broadcast translator for KECG
Call sign	Frequency	City of license	FID	ERP (W)	HAAT	Class	Transmitter coordinates	FCC info
K249DJ	97.7 FM	San Pablo, California	19082	10	138 m (453 ft)	D	37°57′29″N 122°18′41″W	LMS

== History ==
Construction of KECG began in 1972, in the basement of the north wing of the old El Cerrito High School. Mr. Maynes' wood shop built the studios, and the electronics department, under Elmer Peterson, installed the electronics. Originally, KECG was supposed to broadcast "elevator-style" music.

The activation of the transmitter was delayed several years. When the station filed for a construction permit in 1976, NPR station KQED-FM objected to KECG going on the air, stating that "they should broadcast over the telephone line" and raising interference concerns. KGO-TV news anchor Van Amburg was quite helpful, having continued his FCC certification even after moving from engineering to on-air talent. KECG began broadcasting in September 1978; by then, the "elevator music" format plan had been dropped.

After Elmer Peterson died, responsibility for KECG moved from the Industrial Arts division to new leadership, with a more journalistic emphasis. In 2005, the old campus was demolished. KECG's studios currently are located on the high school's 2nd floor.
