= KLWG =

Coordinates: 34.910°N 120.187°W

- Lompoc, California; United States
- Broadcast area: Lompoc, California
- Frequency: 88.1 MHz
- Branding: KLWG 88.1 FM

Programming
- Format: Christian radio

Ownership
- Owner: Calvary Chapel of Lompoc

History
- First air date: 2005
- Call sign meaning: Living Word of God

Technical information
- Licensing authority: FCC
- Facility ID: 90485
- Class: B
- ERP: 2,500 watts
- HAAT: 571 meters (1,873 ft)

Links
- Public license information: Public file; LMS
- Webcast: Listen Live
- Website: KLWG website

KLWG (88.1 FM) is a non-commercial radio station that is licensed to and serves Lompoc, California. The station is owned by Calvary Chapel of Lompoc and broadcasts a Christian talk and teaching format.

== History ==
KLWG was signed on in May 2005 by Calvary Chapel of Lompoc with a Christian talk and teaching format. It is one of two religious stations licensed to serve Lompoc; the other is Christian rock-formatted KRQZ.

KLWG airs programming with an emphasis on Bible teaching, as well as contemporary Christian music. Most of the teaching programs are produced by pastors from Calvary Chapel of Lompoc or other Calvary Chapel congregations throughout the United States.
