= WVRR =

- Point Pleasant, West Virginia; United States
- Broadcast area: Mid-Ohio Valley
- Frequency: 88.1 MHz
- Branding: Walk FM

Programming
- Format: Christian adult contemporary

Ownership
- Owner: Baker Family Stations; (Positive Alternative Radio, Inc.)

History
- First air date: 2000
- Call sign meaning: West Virginia RiveR

Technical information
- Licensing authority: FCC
- Facility ID: 53094
- Class: A
- Power: 3,000 Watts
- HAAT: 88 Meters
- Transmitter coordinates: 38°50′49″N 82°07′50″W

Links
- Public license information: Public file; LMS
- Webcast: WVRR Webstream
- Website: WVRR Online

WVRR ("Walk FM") is a Christian adult contemporary formatted broadcast radio station licensed to Point Pleasant, West Virginia, United States, serving the Mid-Ohio Valley. WVRR is owned and operated by Baker Family Stations as a simulcast of WPJY 88.7 FM in the Parkersburg, West Virginia, area.
