= LV11 =

Radio station in Santiago del Estero, Argentina

Santiago del Estero; Argentina
- Broadcast area: Santiago del Estero Province
- Frequencies: 890 kHz; 89.1 MHz
- Branding: Radio LV11

Programming
- Format: Talk radio

Ownership
- Owner: Grupo Cantos; (Radiodifusora Santiago del Estero, S.A.C.I.)

History
- Founded: August 5, 1937, with the first LV11
- First air date: March 29, 1970

Technical information
- Power: 25 kW

Links
- Website: radiolv11.com.ar

LV11 (890 AM and 89.1 FM) is a radio station in Santiago del Estero, Argentina. It is owned by Radiodifusora Santiago del Estero, S.A.C.I., part of Grupo Cantos. The station began broadcasting in its present form in 1970, though prior to reprivatization, LV11 was the earliest radio station in Santiago del Estero Province, signing on in 1937 and remaining the only local radio service for more than three decades. Its studios are located at 9 de Julio No. 390 in the city center.

== History ==
The first LV11, which was known as La Radio del Norte (The Radio of the North), was put on air on August 5, 1937, by Antonio and José F.L. Castiglione (owners of the local morning newspaper El Liberal) as part of the Radio Belgrano network. It was the second local radio station in northern Argentina after LV7 in San Miguel de Tucumán. LV11 was nationalized under the Peronist government in February 1947 and remained off the air for eight months. Local programming remained similar, but national news bulletins were introduced.

The station's current license on 890 kHz was awarded by the Federal Broadcasting Committee (COMFER) to José María Cantos in 1970 after his Radiodifusora Santiago del Estero won a three-way battle for the station. The privatization of LV11 coincided with the establishment of a local affiliate of Radio Nacional in Santiago del Estero, bringing competition to local radio for the first time; these were the city's lone radio stations until FM broadcasting came to the region at the end of the 1980s. LV11 later began broadcasting on FM at 88.1 MHz.

As part of Grupo Cantos, LV11 has permitted its owner to gain significant political power in the province as a result of its high listenership. Cantos came to own a newspaper (Nuevo Diario), two magazines, and additional FM stations, in addition to non-broadcasting businesses in trucking, food packaging, and construction.
