= WAJC =

Coordinates: 44°43′15″N 93°01′55″W

- Newport, Minnesota; United States
- Broadcast area: Dakota County, Minnesota; Southern Washington County, Minnesota
- Frequency: 88.1 MHz
- Branding: Real Life Radio

Programming
- Format: Contemporary Christian music

Ownership
- Owner: Maranatha Assembly of God Church

History
- First air date: April 2013
- Call sign meaning: Walter Martin, Jesus Christ

Technical information
- Licensing authority: FCC
- Facility ID: 174134
- Class: A
- ERP: 5,520 watts
- HAAT: 22 meters (72 ft)
- Translators: W219DT (91.7 MHz, North Branch, Minnesota)

Links
- Public license information: Public file; LMS
- Webcast: Listen Live
- Website: Official Website

WAJC 88.1 FM is a radio station licensed to Newport, Minnesota, and serving the south central Minneapolis–Saint Paul metropolitan area. The station broadcasts a Contemporary Christian music format and is owned by the Maranatha Assembly of God Church. Its transmitter is located in a park near Coates.

== History ==
On April 19, 2010, the FCC granted a construction permit to the Religious Information Network for a new noncommercial radio station on 88.1 MHz at Newport, a southeastern suburb of the Twin Cities. RIN intended to program a listener-supported station with a variety of Christian and community programming. The first two letters of its call sign, WAJC, stood for the station manager's father, Walter Martin, and the last two stood for Jesus Christ. Its slogan was "Radio With a Mission". Among the programming planned for the station were recordings of Walter Martin's radio program, The Bible Answer Man.

The station began broadcasting in April 2013 and was branded "The Remnant". "The Remnant" was the student-produced Christian rock format from the University of Northwestern – St. Paul, which was simulcast on the HD4 subchannel of that school's KTIS-FM. In 2016, the station was sold to the Maranatha Assembly of God Church for $52,000.

== Translator ==
In 2017, Maranatha Assembly of God Church purchased FM translator 91.7 W219DT in North Branch, Minnesota for $50,000, and the translator began rebroadcasting WAJC.

Broadcast translator for WAJC
Call sign	Frequency	City of license	FID	ERP (W)	HAAT	Class	FCC info
W219DT	91.7 FM	North Branch, Minnesota	139325	50	11 m (36 ft)	D	LMS
