= Broadcasting Corporation of Abia State =

Nigerian state radio station

Broadcasting Corporation of Abia State (BCA)
- Type: Broadcast
- Country: Nigeria
- First air date: 1992
- Availability: National
- Headquarters: Umuahia, Abia State
- Owner: Abia State Government
- Launch date: 16th November, 1992
- Official website: Broadcasting Corporation of Abia
- Language: Igbo, Pidgin, English

Broadcasting Corporation of Abia State (BCA) is a state government-run radio station of Abia State. Established on November 16, 1992, the broadcaster transmits programs daily on 88.1 FM.

== History ==
The BCA was established by edict No. 4 of 1991 promulgated by the then military Administration of Group Captain Frank Ajobene following creation of Abia in 1991, from its initial location at 70 Aba road Umuahia as its headquarter. Since inception, the corporation acquired a piece of land along the government station layout as its permanent location in 1998 is presently housing the corporate Headquarters of the station with slogan “The Station Born To Lead’’.

== Director Generals ==
Since its inception, the BCA has had Eight Director-Generals as follows;

- Chief Anyim Ude 1991–1996
- Chukwunenye Enwere 1996 —1999
- Chief Chuzi Iboko 1999 —2003
- Mr. Mike Alaukwu 2003 — 2007
- Chief Chinedu Ogbuagu 2007 —2011
- Mr. Tito Ezemdi Ukeka 2011 — 2015
- Chief Sir Alozie Ndulaka 2015 — 2016
- Sir Uchenna T. Dike 2016 — 2019
- Anyaso Anyaso O 2019 —2023
- Hyacinth Okoli 2023—2024*
- Francis Nwaubani 2025— till date*

Date.
