= KFLK =

- Minot, North Dakota; United States
- Frequency: 88.1 MHz
- Branding: The Flock 88.1

Programming
- Format: Religious

Ownership
- Owner: Calvary Chapel Minot

History
- Former call signs: KFLK-LP
- Former frequencies: 95.9 MHz
- Call sign meaning: The Flock

Technical information
- Licensing authority: FCC
- Facility ID: 767009
- Class: C1
- ERP: 100,000 watts
- HAAT: 133 meters (436 ft)
- Transmitter coordinates: 48°12′56″N 101°19′7″W

Links
- Public license information: Public file; LMS
- Website: www.calvarychapelminot.org/kflk-88-1-fm

KFLK (88.1 FM) is a radio station licensed to serve the community of Minot, North Dakota. The station is owned by Calvary Chapel Minot and airs a religious format. It had previously operated as a low-power FM station, KFLK-LP 95.9.
