= KGNZ =

KGNZ-FM
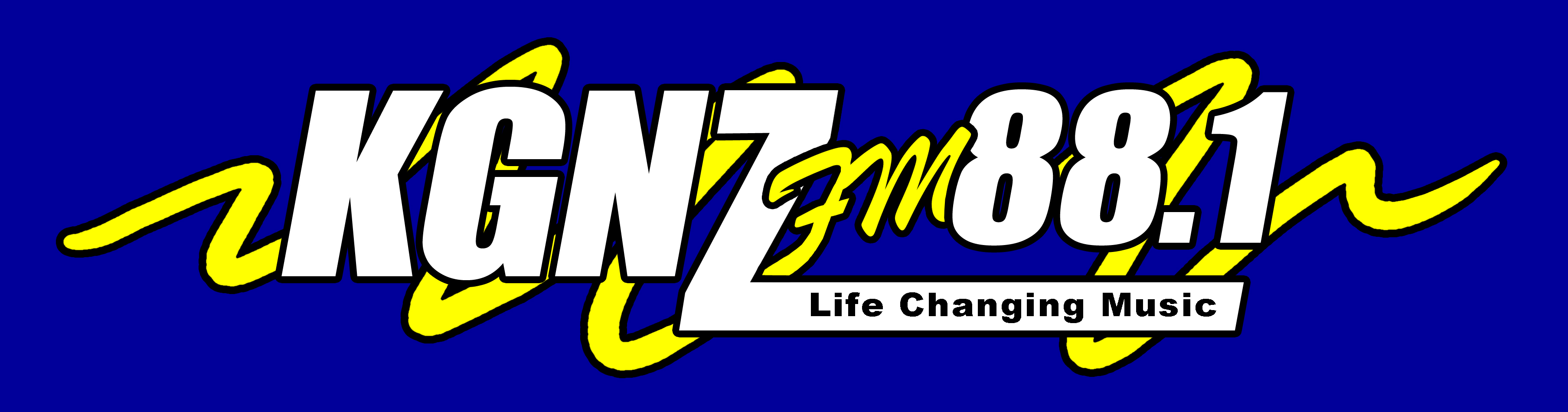
- Abilene, Texas; United States
- Broadcast area: Texas Big Country; Texas Concho Valley; Texas South Plains
- Frequency: 88.1 MHz
- Branding: KGNZ FM 88.1

Programming
- Format: Contemporary Christian music

Ownership
- Owner: Christian Broadcasting Co., Inc.

History
- First air date: March 9, 1981
- Call sign meaning: "King's Good News"

Technical information
- Licensing authority: FCC
- Facility ID: 10920
- Class: C1
- ERP: 91,000 watts
- HAAT: 252 meters (827 ft)
- Transmitter coordinates: 32°13′47″N 99°37′42″W
- Translator: See tables below

Links
- Public license information: Public file; LMS
- Webcast: Listen live
- Website: kgnz.com

KGNZ (88.1 FM) is a noncommercial radio station licensed to Abilene, Texas, United States, and serving Abilene, San Angelo, and Lubbock with a contemporary Christian format. The non-commercial station is under ownership of Christian Broadcasting Co., Inc., a 501.c.3 non-profit organization.

KGNZ is available via 24-hour web streams at KGNZ.com, on TuneIn radio, iTunes Radio, and free applications for Apple and Android devices.

== History ==
KGNZ went on the air during the week of March 1981, making it as the first Christian radio station in Abilene.

== Programming ==
KGNZ currently presents the most daily local programming of any station of any format in the markets it serves. Local, generally live on-air hosts man the station from 7 am until midnight weekdays and from 9 am until 6 pm on Saturdays. The general format is Christian Adult Contemporary, but features a variety of special programming. Weekdays at noon, new and old favorite worship songs are presented during The Praise Hour. The Classic Half-Hour with Ron Rosseau airs weekdays at 1 pm and features CCM classics dating back to the origins of the genre. Many of these tracks originally aired on the station as vinyl records. On July 3, 2017, KGNZ expanded its nighttime offerings, becoming the only religious or secular radio station in the market to offer local programming every weeknight until midnight. The station tapped AISD Shotwell Stadium PA announcer and KGNZ Sunday Morning Living Praise announcer Mike Coffey to take the reins of KGNZ In the Evenings, extending that show an hour until 9pm. KGNZ maintains an active community presence with its free "Community Events Calendar," a service which promotes events for local non-profits and churches both on its website and via hourly on-air announcement at 45 minutes past the hour. KGNZ is the exclusive radio partner for Fields of Faith Abilene, held each September at Shotwell Stadium, and One Kingdom Ministry's "Exalt" Community-wide Worship Service, held each January. The station provides broadcast carriage of each event live in its entirety.

During daylight hours Monday through Saturday, the station rebroadcasts Salem Media Group's SRN News at the top of each hour. On weekdays, KGNZ receives recorded weather updates from degreed meteorologists at media partner KTXS-TV which are broadcast during the morning and afternoon drive windows. The station may cut to these meteorologists' live audio feed during breaking severe weather coverage when life-threatening weather enters the city of Abilene.

KGNZ presents a variety of syndicated talk programming of interest to its listeners including Focus on the Family and the family radio drama Adventures in Odyssey. Current air times of these programs are listed below.

== Stations ==
One full-power station is licensed to simulcast the programming of KGNZ:

Call sign	Frequency	City of license	FID	ERP (W)	HAAT	Class	Transmitter coordinates	FCC info
KLTP	90.9 FM	San Angelo, Texas	120615	2915	191 m (627 ft)	C3	31°25′16″N 100°32′36″W	LMS

== Translators ==
KGNZ programming is currently broadcast on the following translators:

Call sign	Frequency	City of license	FID	ERP (W)	HAAT	Class	Transmitter coordinates	FCC info
K215AM	90.9 FM	Snyder, Texas	10922	316	120 m (394 ft)	D	32°45′53″N 100°53′08″W (NAD27)	LMS
K203CB	88.5 FM	Lubbock, Texas	76197	62	58 m (190 ft)	D	33°28′10″N 101°47′25″W (NAD27)	LMS
K220EZ	91.9 FM	Graham, Texas	10957	143	111 m (364 ft)	D	33°07′24″N 98°35′04″W (NAD27)	LMS

== Technical Information ==
The station's studios feature the latest AoIP (Audio over IP technology using a Wheatstone digital studio featuring twin Wheatstone L-12 digital consoles and an assortment of BLADE interfaces. All studio audio is transported exclusively in digital formats whenever possible. Other equipment includes Neumann TLM-103 microphones, Simian automation, Tieline IP links which allow remote broadcast return to the station at full 192k studio quality audio, Telos One analog phone hybrids, and Inovonics David IV master processing. The link to KLTP and translator sites is by dedicated and encrypted satellite uplink.

In fall 2017, the station installed a new Nautel GV20 digital transmitter at its main tower site. The station will soon retire the nearly 30-year old Continental Electronics 816R tube transmitter it bought new to stand-by usage. The Nautel unit will enable station upgrades in the future to an all-digital signal path to the transmitter point, and later, transmission in HD Radio. As of September 1, 2019, the station was still operating full-time on the old transmitter.
