= KUSW =

- Flora Vista, New Mexico; United States
- Broadcast area: Four Corners
- Frequency: 88.1 MHz

Programming
- Format: Adult Album Alternative
- Affiliations: National Public Radio, AIROS

Ownership
- Owner: KUTE, Inc.
- Sister stations: KSUT

History
- First air date: 2008
- Former call signs: KUUT (2006–2007)

Technical information
- Licensing authority: FCC
- Facility ID: 124178
- Class: C3
- ERP: 4,100 watts (vertical)
- HAAT: 202 meters (663 feet)
- Transmitter coordinates: 36°40′16″N 108°13′54″W

Links
- Public license information: Public file; LMS
- Webcast: Listen Live
- Website: ksut.org

KUSW (88.1 FM) is a non-commercial radio station licensed to Flora Vista, New Mexico, United States. KUSW is owned by KUTE, Inc., and serves the Four Corners area.

This public radio station broadcasts an adult album alternative music format as part of the Four Corners Public Radio and Southern Ute Tribal Radio networks. As such, a portion of its programming is a simulcast of sister station KSUT in Ignacio, Colorado. KUSW is a member station of both National Public Radio and the AIROS Native Radio Network.

Due to its location at the bottom of the FM band (88.1 MHz) and transmitter's close proximity (72 km) to the other station, this station causes a small but legally permissible amount of interference with the analog channel 6 signal (87.75 MHz) of KREZ-TV, a television station licensed to Durango, Colorado. To minimize the interference, KUSW broadcasts with only a vertical polarization.

== History ==
After a nearly five-year application process, this station was granted its original construction permit by the Federal Communications Commission on February 3, 2005. In April 2006, permit holders Native American Christian Voice reached an agreement to transfer the permit to KUTE, Inc. The transfer was approved by the FCC on May 31, 2006, and the transaction was consummated on June 7, 2006.

The new station was assigned the call letters KUUT on June 21, 2006. On March 22, 2007, the station changed its call sign to the current KUSW. KUSW received its license to cover on February 8, 2008.

The KUSW call sign was formerly used by a commercial shortwave radio station in Murray, Utah, which at one point was under the same ownership as KRSP-FM and the former KKDS (later known as KWDZ, now defunct).

In August 2006, the station, then still under construction, received an $85,000 grant from the Corporation for Public Broadcasting for the purchase of equipment needed to make the transition from analog to digital transmission. In September 2007, KUSW received an additional grant from the Corporation for Public Broadcasting to assist in its conversion from analog to digital broadcasting. KUSW was the only radio station in New Mexico to receive such a grant in 2007.
