= KCGS =

- Marshall, Arkansas; United States
- Broadcast area: North Central Arkansas and Vicinity
- Frequency: 960 kHz
- Branding: KCGS AM 960

Programming
- Format: Christian

Ownership
- Owner: Ichthus Outreach Ministries; (Ichthus Outreach Ministries, LLC)

History
- First air date: 1976
- Last air date: 2024

Technical information
- Licensing authority: FCC
- Facility ID: 56054
- Class: D
- Power: 5,000 watts day; 44 watts night
- Transmitter coordinates: 35°54′56.3″N 92°38′20″W
- Translator: 98.9 K255DM (Marshall)

Links
- Public license information: Public file; LMS

KCGS (960 AM) was a radio station serving the Marshall, Arkansas, area with a Christian format. The station was owned by Ichthus Outreach Ministries.

== History ==
KCGS was under the ownership of Southland Broadcasting Corporation from 2002 to 2008. In late 2008, the station was sold to the Word and Faith Christian Church Inc. for $300,000. Effective December 21, 2012, the station was sold to Steven & Alice Kiefer, through licensee Kiefer Retirement Services, Inc. Steve Kiefer changed the format to reflect a Christian news/talk formula. Steve hosted a live show each weekday morning covering current news and issues from a Biblical perspective.

On April 26, 2017, KCGS filed an application with the Federal Communications Commission (FCC) to transfer the license to Ichthus Outreach Ministries, LLC for $100. The sale was completed on July 10, 2017.

The FCC cancelled the station’s license on November 14, 2024. At the time of the closure, the station had been simulcasting with KCGS-FM (88.1).
