= WYTR =

- Robbins, North Carolina; United States
- Frequency: 88.1 MHz
- Branding: Your Truth Radio

Programming
- Format: Christian
- Affiliations: SRN News

Ownership
- Owner: Truth Media Incorporated

History
- First air date: March 2013
- Call sign meaning: Your Truth Radio

Technical information
- Licensing authority: FCC
- Facility ID: 172166
- Class: A
- ERP: 4,700 watts
- HAAT: 53 meters (174 ft)
- Transmitter coordinates: 35°33′35″N 79°41′03″W

Links
- Public license information: Public file; LMS
- Webcast: Listen live
- Website: wytr.org

WYTR (88.1 FM) is a radio station licensed to Robbins, North Carolina. The station broadcasts a Christian format and is owned by Truth Media Incorporated.
