= WWER =

- Colonial Beach, Virginia; United States
- Broadcast area: Colonial Beach, Virginia
- Frequency: 88.1 MHz
- Branding: Colonial Beach Community Radio

Programming
- Format: Community Based

Ownership
- Owner: Colonial Beach Community Radio

History
- First air date: 2010
- Call sign meaning: "Eagle Radio" (former brand)

Technical information
- Licensing authority: FCC
- Facility ID: 173456
- Class: A
- ERP: 100 watts
- HAAT: 32.4 meters (106 ft)
- Transmitter coordinates: 38°15′45.00″N 76°59′54.00″W

Links
- Public license information: Public file; LMS
- Webcast: WWER Webstream
- Website: WWER Online

WWER is a Community Based radio station licensed to and serving Colonial Beach, Virginia. WWER is owned and operated by Colonial Beach Community Radio.

== History ==
The Federal Communications Commission issued the original construction permit for this station on September 25, 2009. It was assigned the WWER call sign on November 3, 2009, and received its license to cover on January 29, 2010.

WWER began as a station under Fredericksburg Christian Schools in 2009. They operated the station until May 28, 2019, when the license was transferred to the Colonial Beach Community Foundation.

Under the direction of Ted Tait and Tom Larson, the station began broadcasting as Colonial Beach Community Radio on June 1, 2019. The station's license was donated by Colonial Beach Community Foundation to Colonial Beach Community Radio effective October 30, 2021.
