= Hampton Roads Educational Telecommunications Association =

Public broadcaster in southeast Virginia, United States

The Hampton Roads Educational Telecommunications Association (HRETA) is a consortium of public school districts in southeastern Virginia that holds the licenses for the public television and radio stations in the Hampton Roads television market. It is headquartered at the Public Telecommunications Center for Hampton Roads on the campus of Old Dominion University in Norfolk.

It presently comprises 20 school districts in Hampton Roads and the Eastern Shore of Virginia: Accomack, Gloucester, Isle of Wight, Mathews, Middlesex, Sussex, Southampton, Northampton and York counties, Williamsburg-James City County Public Schools, and the independent cities of Norfolk, Hampton, Franklin, Newport News, Portsmouth, Chesapeake, Virginia Beach, Suffolk and Poquoson.

The stations under its umbrella are Hampton Roads' PBS member station, WHRO-TV (channel 15, Hampton/Norfolk), NPR news/talk/jazz/folk station WHRV (89.5 FM, Norfolk) and all-classical music WHRO-FM (90.3 FM, Norfolk). They also operate numerous repeater stations across Virginia, four of which repeat WHRV and two of which repeat WHRO-FM.

HRETA traces its roots to 1961, when WHRO-TV went on the air as a collaboration between the Norfolk and Hampton school systems. They were joined by the school systems in the independent cities of Newport News, Portsmouth, Chesapeake, Virginia Beach, Suffolk, as well as Nansemond, York and Isle of Wight counties. In 1968, the 10 school boards formed the Hampton Roads Educational Television Associations to operate channel 15. HRETA had its mission broadened to radio in 1975, when it bought then two-year-old WTGM, Hampton Roads' NPR member station. A year later, HRETA was reorganized under its current name, with the "T" now standing for Telecommunications. WTGM changed its call letters to WHRO-FM in 1978.

As early as 1983, HRETA concluded a second public radio station could be viable. However, it took until 1990 to bring that station online, on 90.3. The new station took over all classical music programming, as well as the WHRO-FM call letters. NPR programming remained on 89.5 under new calls, WHRV.
