= WARY =

Radio station at Westchester Community College in Valhalla, New York

- Valhalla, New York; United States
- Frequency: 88.1 MHz

Programming
- Format: Variety

Ownership
- Owner: Westchester Community College

History
- First air date: October 3, 1973; 52 years ago

Technical information
- Licensing authority: FCC
- Facility ID: 71709
- Class: D
- ERP: 42 watts (horizontal); 39 watts (vertical)
- HAAT: 123 meters
- Transmitter coordinates: 41°4′13.3″N 73°47′23.4″W

Links
- Public license information: Public file; LMS

WARY (88.1 FM) is a radio station broadcasting a variety format. Licensed to Valhalla, New York, United States, the station is currently owned by Westchester Community College (WCC). The station is officially licensed from the Federal Communications Commission.

WARY broadcasts from in the basement of WCC's student center. The station is mainly run by the students of WCC with an all student Executive Board with a school faculty member as the station manager. Each year, the station tries to have their very own concert during the month of May which is often referred to "WARY-Fest" or the "WARY-Showcase".

Programming includes talk radio, rock music, hip-hop, disk jockey, indie music, and a variety of other formats.

Former students from WARY went on to work for employers such as WXRK, Goom Radio, The Opie and Anthony Show, Sirius Satellite Radio, WWE, and The Howard Stern Show.

== See also ==
- Campus radio
- List of college radio stations in the United States
