= KCFD =

- Crawford, Nebraska; United States
- Frequency: 88.1 MHz

Ownership
- Owner: Southern Cultural Foundation

Technical information
- Licensing authority: FCC
- Facility ID: 176723
- Class: A
- ERP: 1,500 watts
- HAAT: 201.0 meters (659.4 ft)
- Transmitter coordinates: 42°45′38″N 103°39′26″W

Links
- Public license information: Public file; LMS

KCFD (88.1 FM) is a radio station licensed to Crawford, Nebraska, United States. The station is currently owned by Southern Cultural Foundation.
