= DWJE =

Radio station in Dagupan, Philippines

Radyo Pangasinan (DWJE)
- Dagupan; Philippines
- Broadcast area: Pangasinan and surrounding areas
- Frequency: 88.5 MHz
- Branding: 88.5 Radyo Pangasinan

Programming
- Languages: Pangasinense, Filipino
- Format: Contemporary MOR, News, Talk

Ownership
- Owner: Pangasinan Gulf Waves Network Corporation

History
- First air date: June 3, 2019
- Former frequencies: 95.3 MHz (2019–2021); 88.1 MHz (2021–2026)
- Call sign meaning: JoEy Valenzuela (station manager)

Technical information
- Licensing authority: NTC
- Power: 1,000 watts

Links
- Website: Official Facebook page

DWJE (88.5 FM), on-air as 88.5 Radyo Pangasinan, is a radio station owned and operated by Pangasinan Gulf Waves Network Corporation. The station's studio and transmitter are located at the 3rd floor, Jumel Bldg., A.B. Fernandez Ave., Dagupan. It broadcasts daily from 5:00 AM to 10:00 PM.

== Programming ==
Weekday mornings on Radyo Pangasinan begin with Junior Morning Na!, an hour-long music program that plays Pangasinan and Ilocano songs. The remainder of the weekday schedule features 5½ hours per day of locally produced news and talk programs (with four hours in the morning primetime slot and 1½ hour in the late-afternoon), with music and entertainment programming from 10:00 AM to 5:00 PM and again from 6:30 PM until sign-off at 10:00 PM.

The weekend schedule focuses more on music and entertainment throughout the broadcast day, with Saturday programming being branded as Throwback Sabado, as well as all-day music automation on Sundays.
