= WFHL =

- New Bedford, Massachusetts; United States
- Frequency: 88.1 MHz
- Branding: Radio WFHL

Programming
- Languages: Portuguese, English
- Format: Christian

Ownership
- Owner: New Bedford Christian Radio, Inc.

History
- First air date: 2003; 23 years ago

Technical information
- Licensing authority: FCC
- Facility ID: 87375
- Class: A
- ERP: 300 watts
- HAAT: 41 meters (135 ft)
- Transmitter coordinates: 41°38′15.4″N 70°52′17.1″W

Links
- Public license information: Public file; LMS

WFHL (88.1 FM) is a radio station broadcasting a Christian radio format. Licensed to New Bedford, Massachusetts, United States. The station is owned by New Bedford Christian Radio, Inc.
