= WRGN =

- Sweet Valley, Pennsylvania; United States
- Broadcast area: Northeastern Pennsylvania
- Frequency: 88.1 MHz
- Branding: The Good News Network

Programming
- Format: Christian Radio

Ownership
- Owner: Good News for Life
- Sister stations: WIVH

History
- First air date: October 15, 1984

Technical information
- Licensing authority: FCC
- Facility ID: 24681
- Class: A
- ERP: 500 watts
- HAAT: 92 meters (302 ft)
- Transmitter coordinates: 41°17′54″N 76°07′28″W

Links
- Public license information: Public file; LMS
- Webcast: Listen Online
- Website: http://www.wrgn.com/

WRGN (88.1 FM) is a Christian radio station licensed to Sweet Valley, Pennsylvania, serving Northeastern Pennsylvania. The station is owned by Good News for Life.

WRGN's programming includes Christian Talk and Teaching and Christian music. Christian Talk and Teaching shows heard on WRGN include; Insight For Living with Chuck Swindoll, Turning Point with David Jeremiah, Love Worth Finding with Adrian Rogers, Joni and Friends, The Urban Alternative with Tony Evans, Focus On The Family, and In The Market with Janet Parshall.

== Translators ==
WRGN: The Good News Network is also heard on translators throughout Northeastern Pennsylvania.

Broadcast translators for WRGN
| Call sign | Frequency | City of license | FID | ERP (W) | HAAT | Class | FCC info |
|---|---|---|---|---|---|---|---|
| W205CL | 88.9 FM | Meshoppen, Pennsylvania | 24687 | 10 | 324.8 m (1,066 ft) | D | LMS |
| W205AG | 88.9 FM | Clarks Summit, Pennsylvania | 24680 | 7 | 307 m (1,007 ft) | D | LMS |
| W213BU | 90.5 FM | Hazleton, Pennsylvania | 81931 | 2 | 160.3 m (526 ft) | D | LMS |
| W230AE | 93.9 FM | Bethlehem, Pennsylvania | 24685 | 10 | 246 m (807 ft) | D | LMS |
| W262AI | 100.3 FM | Forty Fort, Pennsylvania | 24679 | 10 | 279 m (915 ft) | D | LMS |
| W268BL | 101.5 FM | Mifflinville, Pennsylvania | 24684 | 1 | 302.9 m (994 ft) | D | LMS |
