= KTFY =

Radio station in Buhl, Idaho

- Buhl, Idaho; United States
- Broadcast area: Twin Falls (Sun Valley) area
- Frequency: 88.1 MHz
- Branding: 88.1 The Bridge

Programming
- Format: Christian contemporary

Ownership
- Owner: Idaho Conference of Seventh-Day Adventists, Inc.

History
- First air date: August 2005

Technical information
- Licensing authority: FCC
- Facility ID: 91839
- Class: C1
- ERP: 60,000 watts
- HAAT: 199 meters (653 ft)
- Transmitter coordinates: 42°43′48″N 114°25′6″W
- Translator: 97.5 K248BE (Sun Valley)

Links
- Public license information: Public file; LMS
- Webcast: Listen live
- Website: bridgefamily.org

KTFY (88.1 FM) is a radio station broadcasting a Christian contemporary format. Licensed to Buhl, Idaho, United States, the station serves the Twin Falls (Sun Valley) area. The station is currently owned by Idaho Conference of Seventh-Day Adventists, Inc.

== History ==
The station was assigned the calls KTFY on 1998-10-06.
