= WPJY =

- Blennerhassett, West Virginia; United States
- Broadcast area: Parkersburg, WV Area
- Frequency: 88.7 MHz
- Branding: Walk FM

Programming
- Format: Contemporary Christian

Ownership
- Owner: Positive Alternative Radio Inc.
- Sister stations: WKAO, WPJW, WVRR, WOKE

Technical information
- Licensing authority: FCC
- Facility ID: 91837
- Class: B1
- Power: 10,000 watts
- HAAT: 104.0 meters
- Transmitter coordinates: 39°14′0.00″N 81°53′26.00″W

Links
- Public license information: Public file; LMS
- Webcast: WVRR Webstream
- Website: WPJY Online

WPJY (88.7 FM) is a radio station licensed to Blennerhassett, West Virginia, United States. It is one of the 7 "WALK FM" network of stations. The station is currently owned by Positive Alternative Radio Inc.

== History ==
The station went on the air as WPJY on 1998-10-06. on 2005-12-12, the station changed its call sign to the current WPJY.
