= WKRE =

- Argo, Alabama; United States
- Broadcast area: Jefferson County, Alabama
- Frequency: 88.1 MHz
- Branding: Elijah Radio

Programming
- Format: Christian talk and teaching

Ownership
- Owner: Elijah Radio, Inc.
- Sister stations: WSJL

History
- First air date: February 2011
- Last air date: January 2026

Technical information
- Licensing authority: FCC
- Facility ID: 169863
- Class: A
- ERP: 1,500 watts (vertical polarization); 1 watt (horizontal)
- HAAT: 120 meters (390 ft)
- Transmitter coordinates: 33°39′25″N 86°26′04″W

Links
- Public license information: Public file; LMS
- Webcast: Listen live
- Website: www.elijahradio.org

WKRE (88.1 FM) was a non-commercial, listener-supported radio station licensed to Argo, Alabama. The station, which operated from 2011 to 2026, was owned and operated by Elijah Radio, Inc. Elijah Radio has a chain of radio stations around Alabama broadcasting a Christian talk and teaching format. The studios and offices were in Margaret.

== History ==
In October 2007, Wilbur Gospel Communications and Foundation of Opelika, Alabama, applied to the Federal Communications Commission (FCC) for a construction permit for a new broadcast radio station. The FCC granted this permit on December 12, 2008, with a scheduled expiration date of December 12, 2011. The new station was assigned call sign "WKRE" on August 7, 2009.

On October 21, 2009, Wilbur Gospel Communications and Foundation contracted to sell the WKRE permit (plus the permit for WJAU in Lincoln, Alabama) to Jimmy Jarrell's Alabama Christian Radio, Inc., for a combined sale price of $1. The FCC gave the sale conditional approval on December 9, 2009, and the deal was consummated on December 15, 2009.

On March 19, 2010, Alabama Christian Radio, Inc., reached a deal to sell WKRE's construction permit to Ken Layton's TBTA Ministries for $1. The FCC approved this sale (with conditions) on May 7, 2010, and consummation of the transaction took place on May 20, 2010.

After construction and testing were completed in February 2011, WKRE was granted its broadcast license on March 18, 2011.

In March 2015, this station received a construction permit for a new antenna location in Argo. The new antenna is higher, so power is lower, but more coverage falls over the far eastern Birmingham suburbs than before. That permit was dismissed in July 2016, but another nearly identical one was filed right behind it, further raising antenna height but lowering the power level. That facility was put on the air in March 2017. (Taken from Alabama Broadcast Media Page.)

TBTA Ministries sold WKRE to Elijah Radio for $60,000 in 2024. Elijah closed WKRE in January 2026 after the station's tower lease ended, and surrendered its license in June 2026.
