= WNBV =

- Grundy, Virginia; United States
- Broadcast area: Buchanan County, Virginia and surrounding communities
- Frequency: 88.1 MHz
- Branding: The Eagle 88.1 FM

Programming
- Format: Country music

Ownership
- Owner: Howie Fuller; (Jewell Valley Railroad, Inc.)

History
- First air date: 2009

Technical information
- Licensing authority: FCC
- Facility ID: 173198
- Class: A
- ERP: 100 watts
- HAAT: 45 meters (148 ft)
- Transmitter coordinates: 37°17′18.3″N 82°05′08.4″W

Links
- Public license information: Public file; LMS
- Webcast: Listen live
- Website: www.wnbv881.com

WNBV (88.1 FM), branded as The Eagle 88.1 FM, is a non-commercial educational radio station licensed to Grundy, Virginia. The station serves Buchanan County and neighboring communities with country music, local news, weather information, community announcements, and high school sports broadcasts.

WNBV also airs gospel programming on Sundays. The station is owned and operated by Howie Fuller through licensee Jewell Valley Railroad, Inc.

== Programming ==
WNBV's programming includes contemporary country music, local news and weather updates, emergency information, community announcements, and live coverage of Buchanan County high school sports. The station identifies itself on air as “The Eagle 88.1 FM.”
