= 2RDJ =

2RDJ-FM - Sydney NSW Australia
- Burwood, New South Wales; Australia
- Broadcast area: Inner West Sydney
- Frequency: 88.1 MHz

Programming
- Format: Community radio

Ownership
- Owner: RDJ-FM Community Radio Co-op Ltd

History
- First air date: 5 November 1983

Links
- Webcast: Listen Live
- Website: Official Site

2RDJ-FM is a community radio station based in Burwood and broadcasts to the Inner West suburbs of Sydney.

2RDJ-FM aims to provide a local voice for and to promote Sydney's Inner West through open access to the community of their own broadcasting facilities. The station also aims to provide a mix of entertainment, information, news and training opportunities that reflects the community's needs and interests.

== History ==
The original idea of establishing a community radio station was formulated in 1975 by Vince Murray, Warwick Madden, Kent & Dorothy Broadhead. After a proposal paper was written, a steering committee was set up. The first public meeting was held at the Burwood Public Library on 15 October 1975 where office-bearers were elected.

It was found that there was no provision in the then Broadcasting and Television Act for the issuing of community broadcasting licences. The members of 2RDJ-FM Community Radio set about lobbying the federal government to prove the necessity and practical benefits of public broadcasting. But they met with no success. During this period the Community Broadcasting Association of Australia was founded. The CBAA brought all aspiring public broadcasting groups under the one umbrella, in the process creating a lobby group that had greater influence.

Between 1975 and 1982 2RDJ-FM carried out a number of test transmissions. The first studios were two that were already established within the home of Kent & Dorothy Broadhead at 6 Riverview Street Cabarita (Sydney) NSW. The first test transmission involved the volunteer members of the radio station themselves assembling and erecting an FM mast in the backyard. In early 1979 the station moved into the newly restored Woodstock Centre of Community in Church Street, Burwood NSW. The studios were official opened by The Right Hon Sir William McMahon G.C.M.G., C.H., M.P., Federal Member for Lowe, on 1 December 1979.

In 1982 the then Minister for Communications Ian Sinclair toured the Burwood area during election campaigning. The Mayor of Burwood, Alderman Phillip Taylor invited Mr Sinclair on a tour of the Woodstock Centre, which included an inspection of the 2RDJ-FM studios. Mr Sinclair was informed about the plight of aspirant public broadcasters being unable to apply for a full-time broadcast licence.

A few months later a notice appeared in the Sydney Morning Herald calling for applications for nine C Class Public Broadcasting Licences in the Sydney metropolitan area. Following a public hearing on 5 September 1982 the then Australian Broadcasting Tribunal granted a licence to 2RDJ-FM to serve the Inner West suburbs of Sydney.

During the following fourteen months a 100-foot mast was erected adjacent to the Woodstock building and the studios and equipment were upgraded. After many test runs, 2RDJ-FM went to air at 7:00am on 5 November 1983.

== Current ==
2RDJ-FM broadcasts around 80 hours a week of locally produced programs, supplemented by content from the CBAA National Program stream. The station has two studios, each fully capable of live-to-air stereo broadcasts. Broadcast power is currently 100 watts ERP with the entire station, transmitter, and antenna mast co-located in the Woodstock Building, Burwood. The station also delivers its programs worldwide via the internet 24/7 on www.radio2rdj.com. The station is funded mainly through sponsorship contributions, member subscriptions, and occasional grants and donations.

2RDJ-FM normally operates four or five outside broadcasts (OBs) each year, in support of (Sydney) Inner West community events such as fairs, local Council festivals, and carnivals. Special programs produced live at these OBs replace normal weekend programming and allow the community to meet 2RDJ personalities.

2RDJ-FM is proud to have several highly popular voices among its presenter line-up including June Donovan, John Elwell, John Dale, Camilo Piovesan, Rob Langley, and Bryan Vaughan, Audrey Wacks, and James Williams, as well as the ethnic program presenters including the Ireland Calling crew led by Catherine Crosse, and Tina King-Garde.

2RDJ-FM's program schedule is available on the station's website.

== Programming ==
The station's current programs cover diverse music styles from jazz, classic pop and rock, ethnic music, dance, and show music. All music programs aim for at least 30% Australian content (except ethnic shows). Most programs feature community news and some contain interviews. A few programs are broadcast by specialist interest groups or in languages other than English. Weekday programs are 'bookended' by a Breakfast show (7-9 am) and a popular Drive show (5-7 pm). Occasional slots are filled by the CBAA National Program

== See also ==
- List of radio stations in Australia
