= WTZI =

Radio station Rosemont, Illinois

- Rosemont, Illinois; United States
- Broadcast area: Chicago
- Frequency: 88.1 MHz
- Branding: Hindi88

Programming
- Format: Ethnic

Ownership
- Owner: RadioED

History
- First air date: 2007
- Former call signs: WFRT (2007-2008)

Technical information
- Licensing authority: FCC
- Facility ID: 173970
- Class: A
- ERP: 300 watts
- HAAT: 22 meters (72 ft)
- Transmitter coordinates: 41°57′20″N 87°52′02″W

Links
- Public license information: Public file; LMS
- Webcast: WTZI Stream
- Website: Hindi88

WTZI is an ethnic radio station located in Rosemont, Illinois. It primarily broadcasts Indian music under a non-profit no commercials format and serves the Chicagoland Area.

== History ==
The station began broadcasting in December 2007 under the callsign WFRT. In January of next year, it would be changed to WTZI. The station would spend most of its life as an affiliate of the Calvary Radio Network with its studio set up in Valaparsio, Indiana airing Christian-oriented programming. in 2021, Calvary would sell the station to RadioEd for $120,000. The station now broadcasts a multicultural format of various programs mostly catering to an Indian audience.
