= KTUA =

Radio station in Coweta, Oklahoma

- Coweta, Oklahoma; United States
- Broadcast area: Tulsa metropolitan area
- Frequency: 88.1 MHz (HD Radio)

Programming
- Format: Christian worship music
- Subchannels: HD2: K-Love (Christian adult contemporary); HD3: Radio Nueva Vida (Spanish Christian)
- Network: Air1

Ownership
- Owner: Educational Media Foundation; (K-Love, Inc.)

History
- First air date: February 2005
- Former call signs: KDIM (2005–2021)
- Call sign meaning: Tulsa's Air1

Technical information
- Licensing authority: FCC
- Facility ID: 81516
- Class: C1
- ERP: 100,000 watts
- HAAT: 136 meters (446 ft)
- Transmitter coordinates: 35°42′24″N 96°5′39″W

Links
- Public license information: Public file; LMS
- Website: air1.com

KTUA (88.1 FM) is a radio station licensed to Coweta, Oklahoma, United States, and serving the Tulsa metropolitan area. The station is currently owned by the Educational Media Foundation and broadcasts the Air1 network.

== History ==
In 2002, the Federal Communications Commission approved a 1996 application from David Ingles Ministries Church Inc. for a construction permit for this station. On January 6, 2003, the station took the call sign KDIM and signed on the air in February 2005. Under David Ingles Ministries, KDIM was part of the Oasis Radio Network.

In August 2021, KDIM was sold to the Educational Media Foundation for $2.415 million. When the sale closed on December 2, 2021, the station began airing EMF's Air 1 network. Air1 had been heard on KWRI (89.1 FM) at Bartlesville and two translators in the Tulsa metro area, which became KKLB and joined the K-Love network. The station changed its call sign to KTUA on December 21, 2021.
