= WBGY =

Radio station in Everglades City, Florida

- Everglades City, Florida; United States
- Broadcast area: Everglades City and Marco Island, Florida
- Frequency: 90.3 MHz
- Branding: 98.1 FM Marco Island

Programming
- Format: Full-service

Ownership
- Owner: Kol Halev 2000 Corporation

Technical information
- Licensing authority: FCC
- Facility ID: 47386
- Class: A
- ERP: 110 watts
- HAAT: 33 meters (108 ft)
- Transmitter coordinates: 25°51′56.00″N 81°23′9.00″W
- Translator: 98.1 W251BL (Everglades City)

Links
- Public license information: Public file; LMS
- Webcast: Listen Live (via TuneIn); Listen Live (PLS)
- Website: 98.1 FM Marco Island

WBGY (90.3 FM) is a non-commercial radio station licensed to Everglades City, Florida. the station serves Marco Island and airs a full-service format. The station is owned by the Kol Halev 2000 Corporation. The station also simulcasts on low-power Everglades City translator W251BL, 98.1 FM.

WBGY applied to the FCC in January 2015 for a city of license change from Naples, Florida to Everglades City, Florida, along with a power increase and change of tower location.
