= KFHC =

- Ponca, Nebraska; United States
- Broadcast area: Sioux City, Nebraska
- Frequency: 88.1 MHz
- Branding: Siouxland Catholic Radio

Programming
- Format: Religious
- Affiliations: EWTN, Ave Maria Radio

Ownership
- Owner: St. Gabriel Communications Ltd.

History
- First air date: 2008
- Call sign meaning: Father Harold Cooper (founder)

Technical information
- Licensing authority: FCC
- Facility ID: 90282
- Class: C3
- ERP: 2,280 watts (horizontal) 8,800 watts (vertical)
- HAAT: 127.2 meters (417 ft)
- Transmitter coordinates: 42°27′48″N 96°37′1.9″W

Links
- Public license information: Public file; LMS
- Website: Official website

KFHC (88.1 FM) is a radio station broadcasting a religious music format. Licensed to Ponca, Nebraska, U.S., the station serves the Sioux City area. The station is currently owned by St. Gabriel Communications Ltd.
