= WCRX (FM) =

College radio station in Illinois, United States

Coordinates: 41.873°N 87.648°W

- Chicago, Illinois; United States
- Broadcast area: Downtown; Near North; South Loop; West Loop
- Frequency: 88.1 MHz (HD Radio)
- Branding: Chicago's Underground Radio

Programming
- Format: dance radio; hip hop; top 40
- Affiliations: Pacifica Radio

Ownership
- Owner: Columbia College Chicago

History
- First air date: June 1975
- Former call signs: WUIC (1975–1982)

Technical information
- Licensing authority: FCC
- Facility ID: 12424
- Class: A
- ERP: 100 watts horizontal; 90 watts vertical
- HAAT: 39 meters (128 ft)

Links
- Public license information: Public file; LMS
- Webcast: Listen live
- Website: wcrx.colum.edu

WCRX (88.1 FM) is a non-commercial campus radio station in Chicago, Illinois, owned and operated by Columbia College Chicago. The station is located at 33 East Congress in Chicago and operated by students in the school's radio department. WCRX provides music, news, sports, and community affairs programming.

== History ==
=== University of Illinois at Chicago ===
The WCRX license was established as WUIC, the radio station of the University of Illinois at Chicago Circle, in June 1975. The station broadcast eight hours a day.

=== Columbia College Chicago ===
The university filed to sell WUIC to Columbia on August 25, 1982. Upon taking control in November, the station received new WCRX call letters.

== See also ==
- Campus radio
- List of college radio stations in the United States
