= WJJJ =

- Beckley, West Virginia; United States
- Broadcast area: Beckley, West Virginia; Princeton, West Virginia; Hinton, West Virginia
- Frequency: 88.1 MHz
- Branding: The Sweetest Sound in Town

Programming
- Format: Christian easy listening

Ownership
- Owner: Shofar Broadcasting Corporation

History
- First air date: 2007

Technical information
- Facility ID: 77815
- Class: B1
- ERP: 840 Watts
- HAAT: 348 meters (1,142 ft)
- Transmitter coordinates: 37°35′20.0″N 81°6′52.0″W

Links
- Webcast: WJJJ Webstream
- Website: https://sweetestsoundradio.org/

WJJJ is a Christian easy listening formatted broadcast radio station licensed to Beckley, West Virginia, serving the Beckley/Princeton/Hinton area. WJJJ is owned and operated by Shofar Broadcasting Corporation. The station is simulcast on WXAF 90.9 in Charleston, West Virginia
