= WPEB =

Radio station in Philadelphia

Philadelphia, Pennsylvania, U.S.; United States
- Broadcast area: University of Pennsylvania; University City Neighborhood
- Frequency: 88.1 MHz
- Branding: "88.1 WPEB-FM"

Programming
- Format: Variety

Ownership
- Owner: Scribe Video Center, Inc.

History
- First air date: 1981
- Call sign meaning: West Philadelphia Educational Broadcasting Corporation (original licensee)

Technical information
- Class: D
- Power: 1 Watt
- HAAT: 21 Meters
- Transmitter coordinates: 39°56′57.0″N 75°13′9.0″W
- Translator: 95.1 W236CL (Philadelphia)

Links
- Website: WPEB 88.1 FM

WPEB is a variety formatted broadcast radio station licensed to Philadelphia, Pennsylvania, United States.

Due to WPEB's low wattage, the station only serves West Philadelphia and the University City Neighborhood. WPEB is owned and operated by Scribe Video Center, Inc.

== History ==
WPEB, is the abbreviation for West Philadelphia Educational Broadcasting it was formed as a non-profit Corp organization in 1977. The station was located at Calvary United Methodist Church. The station was originally design as ground based educational media platform for the diverse couture located in west Philadelphia. Some of the forma board members was; Hal Taussig, Matt Myers and Audrie Brown.

It began in 1981 in studios located in the basement of Calvary Church on 48th Street at Baltimore Avenue.

In September 2005, WPEB filed a Suspension of Operations with the U.S. Federal Communications Commission (FCC), "in order to resolve complaints of interference to other stations."

In early 2008, Philadelphia saw the rebirth of WPEB 88.1 FM. In its first stage, the new WPEB is being stewarded by Scribe Video Center. Partnering with Scribe are two West Philadelphia-based organizations in particular, the Philadelphia Independent Media Center (Philly IMC) and the Prometheus Radio Project, and a growing variety of community and cultural groups. WPEB provides a much needed local media outlet to serve as a voice for West Philadelphia's many communities. The station provides a forum for community-based organizations and be a place to discuss the issues that affect the communities, play music not heard on mainstream media, and promote education and creative substantive expression.

== Transmission ==
WPEB is one of very few Class D FM stations still on the air. A translator has been added on 95.1 MHz with the call W236CL.

== See also ==
- Low-Power to the People 11/21/07
