= WHRO-FM =

Public radio station in Norfolk, Virginia

- Norfolk, Virginia; United States
- Broadcast area: Hampton Roads
- Frequency: 90.3 MHz (HD Radio)
- Branding: WHRO-FM

Programming
- Format: Public radio Classical music
- Subchannels: HD2: Big band/old time radio; HD3: Christian contemporary (WRVL)
- Affiliations: American Public Radio; NPR; Public Radio International

Ownership
- Owner: Hampton Roads Educational Telecommunications Association
- Sister stations: WFOS, WHRE, WHRF, WHRG, WHRJ, WHRL, WHRO-TV, WHRV, WHRX

History
- First air date: 1990; 36 years ago
- Former call signs: WHRV (1989–1990)
- Call sign meaning: A dual meaning of Homeroom One (reflecting WHRO-TV's instructional beginnings), and the Hampton Roads region

Technical information
- Licensing authority: FCC
- Facility ID: 25940
- Class: B
- ERP: 8,800 watts
- HAAT: 350.3 meters (1,149 ft)
- Transmitter coordinates: 36°48′31.0″N 76°30′13.0″W
- Translator: 96.9 W245BB (Newport News)

Links
- Public license information: Public file; LMS
- Webcast: Listen live
- Website: whro.org/radio/

WHRO-FM (90.3 MHz) is a public radio broadcast radio station, broadcasting a classical music format. WHRO is licensed to Norfolk, Virginia, serving Hampton Roads. WHRO-FM is owned and operated by the Hampton Roads Educational Telecommunications Association.

As early as 1983, a feasibility study indicated that Hampton Roads could support a second public radio station alongside HRETA's existing station, WHRO-FM at 89.5. However, it took until 1989 to obtain a construction permit for the second frequency, on 90.3. The new station signed on in 1990 and took all classical music programming from 89.5, as well as the WHRO-FM call letters. NPR programming remained on 89.5 under new calls, WHRV.

== Radio reading service ==
Virginia Voice, a radio reading service for the blind, is broadcast on a subcarrier of WHRO. In addition, WHRO Voice is streamed online.

== WHRO HD Radio ==
As of June 2021, WHRO-HD2 broadcasts the Time Machine Radio Network, a channel dedicated to early-20th century Dixieland, swing, blues, and big band music, nostalgia, and old time radio, on its HD-2 channel. The Time Machine Radio Network is also simulcast on full power station WFOS and translator station W257BV. Previously, WHRO aired the independently produced and similarly programmed 1920's Radio Network on the channel

Call sign	Frequency	City of license	FID	ERP (W)	Class	FCC info
W257BV	99.3 FM	Virginia Beach, Virginia	149921	250	D	LMS

WHRO-HD3 hosts Liberty University's The Journey network (originating from WRVL/Lynchburg), a statewide CCM network, which feeds four analog FM translator stations across Hampton Roads and repeats full-power WVRL/Elizabeth City, North Carolina.

== Repeaters ==
WHRO-FM operates two full-powered repeater stations to serve areas not covered by the main signal.

Call sign	Frequency	City of license	FID	ERP (W)	Class	FCC info
WHRF	98.3 FM	Belle Haven, Virginia	181073	6,000	A	LMS
WHRJ	89.9 FM	Gloucester Courthouse, Virginia	173971	750	A	LMS
