= KGIF (FM) =

Radio station in Tafuna, American Samoa

Tafuna; American Samoa
- Broadcast area: American Samoa
- Frequency: 88.1 MHz
- Branding: KGIF

Programming
- Format: Full Service, Religious

Ownership
- Owner: Leone Church of Christ

History
- First air date: 2012
- Call sign meaning: Keeping God In Families

Technical information
- Licensing authority: FCC
- Facility ID: 175279
- Class: C2
- ERP: 1,500 watts
- HAAT: 413 meters (1355 feet)
- Transmitter coordinates: 14°19′21″S 170°45′47″W

Links
- Public license information: Public file; LMS

KGIF (88.1 FM) is a non-commercial FM radio station owned by Leone Church of Christ. Licensed to Tafuna, American Samoa, it airs a religious format.

The station was assigned the KGIF call letters by the Federal Communications Commission on February 3, 2012.
