= WHRV =

- Norfolk, Virginia; United States
- Broadcast area: Hampton Roads
- Frequency: 89.5 MHz (HD Radio)
- Branding: WHRV 89.5

Programming
- Format: Public radio, talk, jazz and Americana
- Subchannels: HD2: Adult album alternative
- Affiliations: NPR; APM; PRX; BBC World Service

Ownership
- Owner: Hampton Roads Educational Telecommunications Association
- Sister stations: WFOS, WHRE, WHRF, WHRG, WHRJ, WHRL, WHRO-FM, WHRO-TV, WHRX

History
- First air date: July 15, 1973
- Former call signs: WTGM (1973–1978); WHRO-FM (1978–1990)
- Call sign meaning: Hampton Roads Virginia

Technical information
- Licensing authority: FCC
- Facility ID: 25933
- Class: B
- ERP: 34,000 watts
- HAAT: 181.7 meters (596 ft)
- Transmitter coordinates: 36°48′32.0″N 76°30′13.0″W
- Translator: 101.7 W269BQ (Virginia Beach)

Links
- Public license information: Public file; LMS
- Webcast: Listen live; Listen live (HD2)
- Website: WHRV.org/radio

WHRV (89.5 FM) is a non-commercial radio station licensed to Norfolk, Virginia, United States. It is the primary NPR member station for the Hampton Roads section of Virginia, and is sister to PBS member WHRO-TV (channel 15). Owned by the Hampton Roads Educational Telecommunications Association, a consortium of 19 school districts in Hampton Roads and the Eastern Shore, studios are in the Public Telecommunications Center on the campus of Old Dominion University in Norfolk.

WHRV's transmitter is sited on Nansemond Parkway in Suffolk. Programming is also heard on four repeater stations and an FM translator. WHRV broadcasts in HD Radio; the HD2 digital subchannel plays adult album alternative (AAA) music and is known as "AltRadio."

== History ==
The station signed on the air in July 15, 1973. Its original call sign was WTGM. It was owned by the Virginia Cultural Foundation. WTGM-FM aired a mix of classical music, NPR news and community programs.

Within only two years, however, the station ran into severe financial problems. That forced HRETA (then known as the Hampton Roads Educational Television Association) to step in and rescue the station.

HRETA changed the call letters to WHRO-FM in 1978. The new call sign would match the radio and television stations. In the early 1980s, a feasibility study indicated that a second public radio station could be viable. The plan was one station would specialize in classical music, while the other would concentrate on informational and news programs, along with some other genres of music. However, it was not until 1988 that HRETA won a second noncommercial license, on 90.3 MHz. On September 21, 1990, 90.3 FM signed on as a full-time classical music station, taking the WHRO-FM call letters. NPR news and information programming remained on 89.5 under new call letters, WHRV.

== Programming ==
On weekdays, WHRV airs news and talk programming from NPR and other public radio networks. Weekday programs include Morning Edition, All Things Considered, Fresh Air, 1A, Here and Now and Marketplace. Shows heard once a week, either middays or on weekends, include The TED Radio Hour, Radiolab, Reveal, The Splendid Table, On The Media, Science Friday, A Way with Words, Selected Shorts, With Good Reason, Snap Judgment, Left, Right and Center and Wait, Wait, Don't Tell Me. The BBC World Service runs all night.

Nights and weekends, there are programs featuring multiple genres of music not found on commercial radio stations. Locally produced shows include Out of the Box with Paul Shagrue, a mix of Americana, Blues, Reggae, Singer-Songwriter, Cajun and World Beat. Friday evenings feature The R&B Chronicles with Jae Sinnett airing classic Rhythm & Blues music. Pickin' airs on Sunday evenings, featuring two hours of bluegrass and traditional country music. Acoustic Highway with Barry Graham ranges from classic bluegrass and traditional Appalachian music to songs of the new folk movement. WHRV also carries NPR's The Thistle and Shamrock with Fiona Ritchie, featuring Celtic music from Scotland, Ireland, Canada and the U.S.

== HD Radio ==
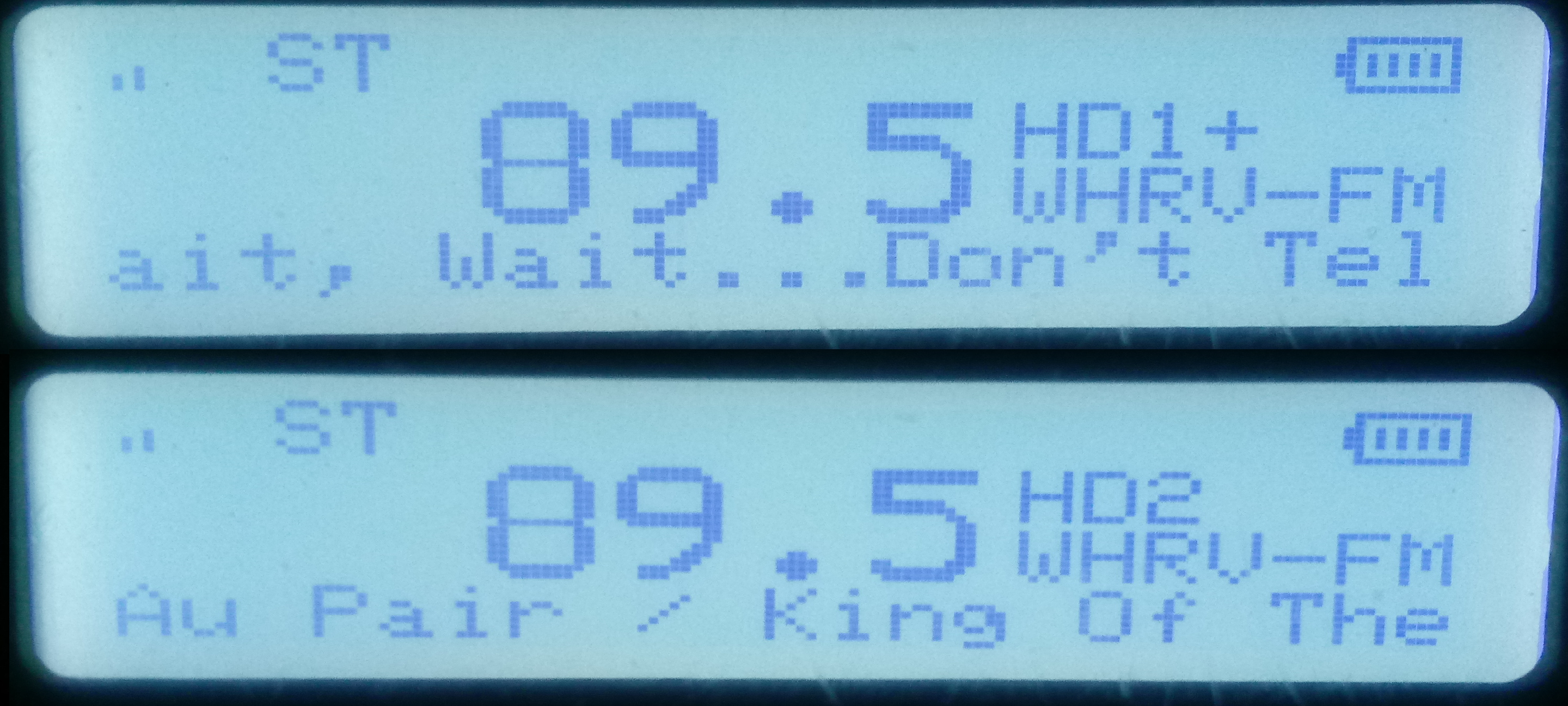
WHRV's HD Radio Channels on a SPARC Radio with PSD.

Channel	Format	Branding
HD-1	Public Radio	89.5 WHRV
HD-2	Adult Album Alternative	AltRadio

== Repeaters ==
WHRV operates a number of full-powered repeater stations to serve portions of the Eastern Shore and Southside Virginia.

Call sign	Frequency	City of license	FID	ERP (W)	Class	FCC info
WHRE	91.9 FM	Eastville, Virginia	173972	4,400	A	LMS
WHRG	88.5 FM	Gloucester Point, Virginia	173962	9,600	B1	LMS
WHRL	88.1 FM	Emporia, Virginia	175907	4,200	A	LMS
WHRX	90.1 FM	Nassawadox, Virginia	91505	46,000	B	LMS

Additionally, the station operates a 250 watt translator station, W269BQ, at 101.7 MHz in Virginia Beach, which serves sections of that community that do not get a clear signal from 89.5.
