= KPPP-LP =

- Fargo, North Dakota; United States
- Frequency: 88.1 MHz
- Branding: KPPP-LP FM 88.1

Programming
- Format: World ethnic

Ownership
- Owner: The People's Press Project

History
- First air date: January 2016

Technical information
- Licensing authority: FCC
- Facility ID: 193229
- Class: L1
- ERP: 22 watts
- HAAT: 56 metres (184 ft)
- Transmitter coordinates: 46°52′28″N 96°47′3″W

Links
- Public license information: LMS
- Website: Official Website

KPPP-LP (88.1 FM) is a radio station licensed to serve the community of Fargo, North Dakota. The station is owned by The People's Press Project. It airs a world ethnic radio format.

The station was assigned the KPPP-LP call letters by the Federal Communications Commission on February 5, 2014.
