= WJLZ =

Radio station in Virginia Beach, Virginia

- Virginia Beach, Virginia; United States
- Broadcast area: Southside of Hampton Roads
- Frequency: 88.5 MHz
- Branding: Current FM

Programming
- Language: English
- Format: Christian contemporary hit radio

Ownership
- Owner: Virginia Beach Educational Broadcasting Foundation, Inc.

History
- First air date: February 12, 1989
- Former call signs: WODC (1987–2003)
- Call sign meaning: Jesus Live

Technical information
- Licensing authority: FCC
- Facility ID: 69636
- Class: A
- ERP: 1,200 watts
- HAAT: 36 meters (118 ft)
- Transmitter coordinates: 36°50′30.70″N 76°5′37.00″W

Links
- Public license information: Public file; LMS
- Webcast: WJLZ Webstream
- Website: WJLZ Online

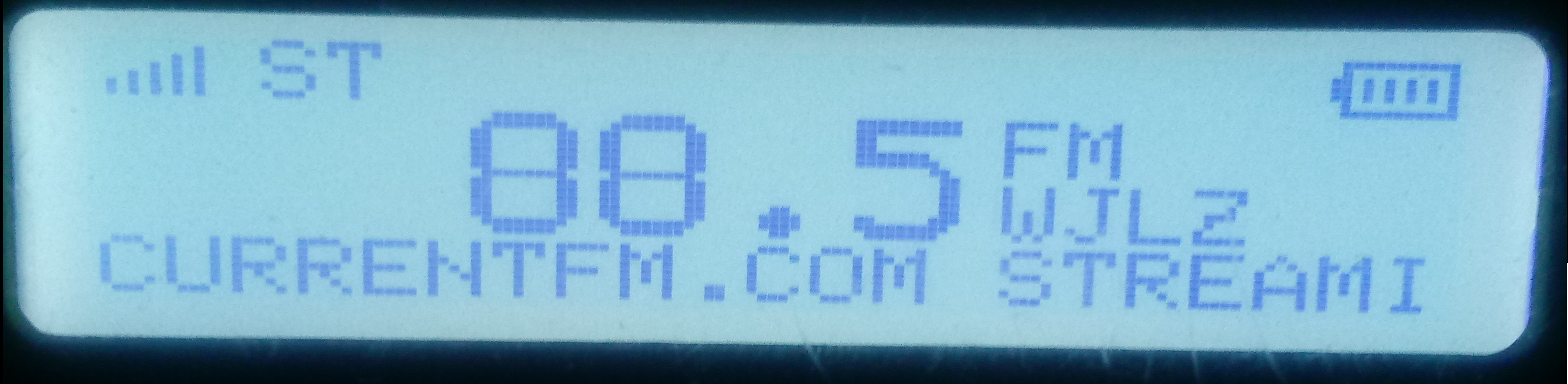
WJLZ on a SPARC HD Radio with RDS.

WJLZ is a contemporary Christian hit radio formatted broadcast radio station licensed to Virginia Beach, Virginia, serving the Southside of Hampton Roads. WJLZ is owned and operated by Virginia Beach Educational Broadcasting Foundation, Inc.

== Translators ==
In addition to the main station, WJLZ is relayed by three FM translators to widen its broadcast area.

Call sign	Frequency	City of license	FID	ERP (W)	HAAT	Class	FCC info
W279AD	(103.7 FM) FM	Chesapeake, Virginia	18864	55 watts	65 m (213 ft)	D	LMS
W280CX	(103.9 FM) FM	Norfolk, Virginia	18861	170 watts	32.4 m (106 ft)	D	LMS
W250AE	(97.9 FM) FM	Portsmouth, Virginia	18865	250 watts	16.3 m (53 ft)	D	LMS
