= KLFC (FM) =

- Branson, Missouri; United States
- Frequency: 88.1 MHz
- Branding: Life FM

Programming
- Format: Christian Contemporary Music

Ownership
- Owner: Mountaintop Broadcasting, Inc.

Technical information
- Licensing authority: FCC
- Facility ID: 70362
- Class: A
- ERP: 1,800 watts
- HAAT: 119 meters (390 ft)
- Transmitter coordinates: 36°33′08″N 93°14′17″W

Links
- Public license information: Public file; LMS
- Webcast: Listen live
- Website: klfcradio.com

KLFC is a radio station airing a Contemporary Christian music format licensed to Branson, Missouri, broadcasting on 88.1 FM. The station is owned by Mountaintop Broadcasting, Inc.
