= KPGS =

- Pagosa Springs, Colorado; United States
- Frequency: 88.1 MHz(HD Radio)
- Branding: Four Corners Public Radio

Programming
- Format: album adult alternative
- Affiliations: National Public Radio, Public Radio International

Ownership
- Owner: Kute

Technical information
- Licensing authority: FCC
- Facility ID: 123206
- Class: C3
- ERP: 1,000 watts
- HAAT: 416 meters (1,365 ft)
- Transmitter coordinates: 37°11′48″N 107°7′1″W

Links
- Public license information: Public file; LMS
- Website: Official website

KPGS (88.1 FM, Four Corners Public Radio) is a radio station broadcasting an album adult alternative music format. It is licensed to Pagosa Springs, Colorado, United States. The station is owned by Kute and features programming from National Public Radio and Public Radio International.

KPGS broadcasts in the HD Radio format.
