= WHRO-TV =

Television station in Hampton–Norfolk, Virginia

- Hampton–Norfolk, Virginia; United States
- Channels: Digital: 31 (UHF); Virtual: 15
- Branding: WHRO

Programming
- Affiliations: 15.1: PBS; for others, see § Subchannels

Ownership
- Owner: Hampton Roads Educational Telecommunications Association
- Sister stations: WFOS, WHRO-FM, WHRV

History
- First air date: October 2, 1961
- Former channel numbers: Analog: 15 (UHF, 1961–2009); Digital: 16 (UHF, 2002–2020)
- Former affiliations: NET (1961–1970)
- Call sign meaning: Hampton Roads, the region the station serves

Technical information
- Licensing authority: FCC
- Facility ID: 25932
- ERP: 1,000 kW
- HAAT: 375.3 m (1,231 ft)
- Transmitter coordinates: 36°48′31.8″N 76°30′11.3″W

Links
- Public license information: Public file; LMS
- Website: whro.org

WHRO-TV (channel 15) is a PBS member television station licensed to both Hampton and Norfolk, Virginia, United States. It is owned by the Hampton Roads Educational Telecommunications Association (HRETA), a consortium of 21 Hampton Roads and Eastern Shore school systems, alongside public radio stations WFOS (88.7 FM), WHRV (89.5 FM), and WHRO-FM (90.3). The four stations share studios at the Public Telecommunications Center for Hampton Roads next to the campus of Old Dominion University on Hampton Boulevard in Norfolk; WHRO-TV's transmitter is located in Suffolk, Virginia.

Educational television first came to Hampton Roads in 1957 when commercial station WVEC-TV began broadcasting a limited amount of programs for Norfolk city schools. In 1959, WVEC-TV moved from channel 15 to channel 13. When that station discontinued educational programs in 1961, the Hampton and Norfolk school systems formed the Hampton Roads Educational Television Association, bought the channel 15 tower and antenna in Hampton, obtained a new construction permit, and began broadcasting as WHRO-TV on October 2, 1961. Permanent studios were set up in Norfolk near what is now Old Dominion University in 1963. Later in the 1960s, more school divisions in southeastern Virginia joined the association; the station's educational programming earned it a Peabody Award for 1972.

Under the management tenure of John R. Morison, from 1975 to 2001, WHRO-TV merged with a struggling classical music station, today's WHRV; expanded its facilities in 1990; and was recognized as a model station by the Corporation for Public Broadcasting. His successors navigated cuts in support for public broadcasting from the state of Virginia while expanding educational and other services.

== History ==
=== Establishment ===
Channel 21 was the originally allotted channel to Norfolk for educational use when reserved channels were made available in 1952. However, there was no immediate interest in building a station to use the channel as a result of the cost involved. Educational television did not come to Hampton Roads until September 1957, when WVEC-TV (then on channel 15) began broadcasting two hours a day of programs for Norfolk city schools. This was reduced to one hour in 1959, when WVEC-TV moved from ultra high frequency (UHF) channel 15 to very high frequency (VHF) channel 13.

The move of WVEC-TV from channel 15 to channel 13 left an option open for the activation of a dedicated educational station, a matter which became acute when WVEC-TV announced in December 1960 that it would cease carrying educational programming beginning in June 1961. Three months later, in March 1961, an association of local school systems was formed, with proposals to use channel 15 instead of 21 as well as WVEC-TV's former tower from its channel 15 facility. Only two school systems emerged in favor of the project, those in Hampton and Norfolk. The two school systems formed the Hampton Roads Educational Television Association (HRETA), which formally applied for channel 15 on May 29, 1961. Francis N. Crenshaw, the chairman of the Norfolk school board, predicted the station would be in service by September. Both school systems set aside funds to help start the station, and a construction permit was issued on July 17, 1961. The HRETA immediately hired a general manager and executed contracts to buy the former WVEC-TV tower and antenna. An October 2 start date was set, as was the call sign WHRO-TV; the first choice, WHRE, belonged to a ship. The new station also affiliated with National Educational Television (NET).

After a delay in the shipment of the transmitter nearly put the start date in doubt, WHRO-TV began broadcasting on October 2, 1961, as Virginia's first noncommercial television station; the first broadcast, planned for two hours, was cut to 30 minutes by technical difficulties. The next day, educational programs for classroom use were broadcast for the first time. However, some schools lacked UHF converters necessary to view the programs on their VHF-only TV sets, and all-channel sets were not being sold in the Norfolk area even though it had only been two years since WVEC-TV moved to VHF. WHRO-TV was the first educational television station in Virginia. After the first year, the association began encouraging other school systems as well as local private and parochial schools to join in an effort to bring down per-student costs by expanding the number of subscribing schools. The number of courses offered had grown to 20, ranging from fourth-grade social studies to calculus.

=== A studio of its own ===
Initially, all of the station's locally produced educational programs were filmed at the studios of the three commercial stations in Hampton Roads. The HRETA immediately began searching for a studio site and considered locating the studio at one of three schools in the Norfolk system, favoring a site adjacent to the Norfolk College of William & Mary, which in August 1962 became Old Dominion College. The first proposal at the Larchmont School site was initially found to be unsuitable due to site conditions, but the site was approved.

In January 1963, the HRETA awarded a contract for the construction of the studio. Norfolk assumed most of the cost, as it educated more students than Hampton. The facility was completed in August, at which time the station rented a mobile production unit from WVEC-TV to provide equipment until tape recorders and other hardware could be purchased. Programs were still taped and transported to the transmitter until a microwave link was set up from the studio to Hampton in 1964.

More school divisions would join the HRETA in 1964 and 1966. First, on the Middle Peninsula, schools in Gloucester County and Mathews County joined after they lost the use of instructional television from Richmond. Two years later, the schools in the cities of Chesapeake, Newport News, Portsmouth, Suffolk, and Virginia Beach, as well as those in Isle of Wight, Nansemond, and York counties, joined at the board's invitation. In addition, the studios were expanded. With these 10 school divisions, the HRETA formally incorporated in 1968.

WHRO-TV received a George Foster Peabody Award in 1972 for its programs for schools, with four specific shows cited in the announcement; this was unusual, given that educational stations typically received awards for a specific program.

=== Growing beyond education ===
In 1969, WHRO-TV began a campaign to raise its profile in the community and promote its evening programs for adults from NET; the station also set up a community advisory board. NET was replaced with PBS in 1970.

John R. Morison was named the president and general manager in 1975 and oversaw a transformative 26-year tenure for the station. That year, WHRO-TV moved to a new tower and transmitter facility near Driver and became the first public television station on the UHF band to transmit with the maximum 5 million watts. During its construction, two men died in a construction accident, one falling 1,000 feet (300 m) to his death from near the top of the mast. Also in 1975, WHRO-TV merged with WTGM-FM, a struggling classical music station owned by the Virginia Cultural Foundation; to reflect advances in technology and its expanded scope, HRETA renamed itself the Hampton Roads Educational Telecommunications Association in 1976. WTGM-FM was renamed WHRO-FM in 1978; the 89.5 frequency became WHRV when its programming was split and a second WHRO-FM was set up on 90.3 MHz in 1990.

In 1976, WHRO-TV held its first-ever "Great TV Auction" fundraiser. The station continued to conduct annual fundraising auctions through 1991, after which they were eliminated, having fallen short of its goal in their last year.

In 1990, WHRO completed a $5 million facility at its existing site, which offered twice the space of its existing studio complex, and renovated the existing building. The completion followed planning that dated back to 1986 and an 18-month period in which some staffers worked in temporary buildings. By the time Morison announced his retirement, the staff had doubled from 50 to 100 and operating revenue had risen from $2 million to $9 million. A $10.2 million capital campaign to support the station's conversion to digital broadcasting had raised $13 million. Further, in 1996, the Corporation for Public Broadcasting (CPB) cited the station as a model organization.

=== Cutbacks ===
Morison was succeeded by Joseph Widoff, who had worked at WETA-TV in Washington, D.C., prior to leading HRETA. Under Widoff, WHRO completed the launch of its digital television facility, which began broadcasting on channel 16 in March 2002. When it went on the air, WBOC-TV in Salisbury, Maryland, which also broadcast in analog on channel 16, complained of interference created by atmospheric ducting.

However, Widoff's largest challenge in six years of running the broadcaster was navigating drops in support from the Virginia government, which cut funding by 8 percent and 15 percent in consecutive years. From 2001 to 2005, WHRO cut 23 percent of its staff and canceled all of its weekly local TV programs, including public affairs programs such as Hampton Roads Weekly and It's Your Call, becoming the only one of Virginia's five public TV stations with no regular local production. Cuts were prolonged as the station burned through cash reserves from its digitalization capital campaign; from 2003 to 2005, revenues declined by 27 percent. People involved with the station variously described it as in a state of "internal collapse" and "choked with fear and uncertainty and insecurity". The CPB inspector general cited the station for violations of public meeting laws and false certifications. Station officials defended Widoff's belt-tightening as necessary. Widoff remained for five years at WHRO before resigning in September 2006; he was replaced by Bert Schmidt, who joined from WVPT in Harrisonburg. On February 17, 2009—the original date for the digital television transition in the United States—WHRO-TV ceased analog broadcasting on channel 15.

As Virginia state subsidies continued to wane before ultimately being eliminated in 2012, WHRO extended its involvement in educational services sold to local schools. In 2008, WHRO began offering online courses to its member school divisions for free and selling them to others. It also debuted a portal selling workforce training classes. This additional funding helped keep revenues nearly flat and reduced WHRO's dependence on government subsidies.

WHRO's digital signal—broadcast on channel 16 from its start in 2002 and remaining there after the 2009 digital transition—moved to channel 31 on July 3, 2020, as a result of the 2016 United States wireless spectrum auction.

== Funding ==
In fiscal year 2022, WHRO-TV generated $6.59 million in total revenue. $1.3 million was provided, primarily in the form of a Community Service Grant, from the Corporation for Public Broadcasting; more than $2.5 million was generated by local memberships.

== Technical information ==
=== Subchannels ===
WHRO-TV's transmitter is located in Suffolk, Virginia. The station's signal is multiplexed:

Subchannels of WHRO-TV
Subchannel	Res.	Short name	Programming
15.1	1080i	WHRO-HD	PBS
15.2	480i	World	World Channel
15.3	480i	Kids	PBS Kids
15.4	480i	Create	Create
15.5	480i	WHROFNX	First Nations Experience

=== Translators on the Eastern Shore ===
On the Eastern Shore of Virginia, Accomack County owns two translators, W18EG-D and W25AA-D (licensed to Onancock and broadcast from Mappsville), that provide the main channel of WHRO-TV alongside those of WTKR, WAVY-TV, and WVEC.
