= 91.1 FM =

FM radio frequency

The following radio stations broadcast on FM frequency 91.1 MHz:

== Argentina ==
- Aire de Santa Fe in Santa Fe de la Vera Cruz, Santa Fe
- Amadeus Cultura Musical in Buenos Aires
- Amistad in Río Gallegos, Santa Cruz
- Aries in Salta
- CN Radio in Rosario, Santa Fe
- de la Isla in Choele Choel, Rio Negro
- del Cerro in Villa Yacanto de Calamuchita, Córdoba
- del Sol in Río Cuarto, Córdoba
- Monseñor Jorge Gottau in Boquerón, Santiago del Estero
- LRH 721 del valle in Aristóbulo Del Valle, Misiones
- Infinito in Río Grande, Tierra del Fuego
- La Villa in Villa Gessell, Buenos Aires
- Lider in Jujuy
- Nexo Sport in Oberá, Misiones
- Nuestra FM in San Luis
- Nuevo Tiempo in Rosario, Santa Fe
- Radio Casilda Record in Casilda, Santa Fe
- Radio Con Vos Roca in General Roca, Río Negro
- Radio María in La Francia, Córdoba
- Radio María in Gobernador Virasoro, Corrientes
- Radio María in Yuto, Jujuy
- Radio María in El Bolsón, Río Negro
- Radio María in Calchaquí, Santa Fe
- Radio María in Carreras, Santa Fe
- Radio María in Tupungato, Mendoza
- Ritmo in San Francisco, Córdoba
- SI in San Isidro, Buenos Aires
- Total in San Juan
- Universidad in Resistencia, Chaco
- Zero in Mendoza

== Australia ==
- 1CMS in Canberra, Australian Capital Territory
- 3ABCRR in Bendigo, Victoria
- Hot 91 in Sunshine Coast, Queensland

== Belize ==
- KREM FM at Ladyville Village; Independence Village

== Canada (Channel 216) ==
- CBAF-FM-22 in Saint-Quentin, New Brunswick
- CBFX-FM-6 in Mont-Laurier, Quebec
- CBN-FM-2 in Corner Brook, Newfoundland and Labrador
- CBNN-FM in Hopedale, Newfoundland and Labrador
- CBQA-FM in Churchill Falls, Newfoundland and Labrador
- CBSI-FM-2 in Schefferville, Quebec
- CFAD-FM in Salmo, British Columbia
- CFUT-FM in Shawinigan, Quebec
- CINN-FM in Hearst, Ontario
- CJRT-FM in Toronto, Ontario
- CJWH-FM in Whale Cove, Nunavut
- CKNN-FM in Bella Coola, British Columbia
- CKOJ-FM in Ouje-Bougoumou, Quebec
- CKOS-FM in Fort McMurray, Alberta
- CKQK-FM-2 in St. Edward, Prince Edward Island
- CKSX-FM in Sioux Narrows, Ontario
- CKXL-FM in St. Boniface, Manitoba
- VF2122 in Valemount, British Columbia
- VF2344 in Logan Lake, British Columbia
- VF2419 in Charlottetown, Newfoundland and Labrador
- VF2468 in Caribou, Nova Scotia
- VF2469 in Wood Island, Nova Scotia

== China ==
- TJTRS Tianjin Life Radio

== Honduras ==
- HRAX - Musiquera, La Esperanza, Intibucá
- HRAX - Musiquera, Siguatepeque, Comayagua
- HRAX - Musiquera, Comayagua, Comayagua
- HRVV - Radioactiva, La Ceiba, Atlántida

== India ==
- Radio City (Indian radio station) in 20 cities (headquartered at Bangalore)

== Malaysia ==
- Asyik FM in Kuala Lumpur
- Radio Klasik in Sandakan, Sabah
- Mix in Malacca, Northern Johor

== Mexico ==
- XETRA-FM in Tijuana, Baja California
- XHAN-FM in Ocotlán, Jalisco
- XHAWL-FM in Jacala, Hidalgo
- XHECM-FM in Ciudad Mante, Tamaulipas
- XHEMW-FM in San Luis Río Colorado, Sonora
- XHFN-FM in Uruapan, Michoacán
- XHFS-FM in Izúcar de Matamoros, Puebla
- XHIO-FM in Tuxtla Gutiérrez, Chiapas
- XHLTO-FM in León, Guanajuato
- XHMZI-FM in Melchor Múzquiz, Coahuila
- XHPECI-FM In Tulancingo, Hidalgo
- XHPGUA-FM in Guachochi, Chihuahua
- XHPLPZ-FM in La Paz, Baja California Sur
- XHPTOJ-FM in Puerto Vallarta, Jalisco
- XHTC-FM in Torreón, Coahuila

== Nigeria ==
Classic FM in Port Harcourt

== The Philippines (Channel 216) ==
- DYTR in Tagbilaran, Bohol. Known as Bohol True Radio
- DZMC in Tarlac City
- DWDJ in Baguio City
- DWNX-FM in Milaor, Naga City
- DYYR in Boracay Island, Malay, Aklan
- DYMC in Iloilo City
- DWQL in Lucena City
- DYTM in Tacloban City
- DWPS in Gubat, Sorsogon
- DWZB-FM in Puerto Princesa City
- Juander Radyo in Cagayan de Oro City
- DXEP in General Santos City
- DXKV in Pagadian City
- DXNW in Digos City
- DXSW in Bislig City
- DXFC in Koronadal City
- Max FM in Tacurong City

== United States (Channel 216) ==
- KANJ (FM) in Giddings, Texas
- KANX in Sheridan, Arkansas
- KANZ in Garden City, Kansas
- KAOR in Vermillion, South Dakota
- KAQF in Clovis, New Mexico
- KAYC in Durant, Oklahoma
- KBGM in Park Hills, Missouri
- KBSS in Sun Valley, Idaho
- KBWC in Marshall, Texas
- KCCM in Moorhead, Minnesota
- KCFN in Wichita, Kansas
- KCIU-LP in Lawrence, Kansas
- KCSM in San Mateo, California
- KDSC in Thousand Oaks, California
- KEDP in Las Vegas, New Mexico
- KEDR in Glenhaven, California
- KGPF in Sulphur Springs, Texas
- KGWB in Snyder, Texas
- KGWP in Pittsburg, Texas
- KHEC in Crescent City, California
- KHKV in Kerrville, Texas
- KHYG-FM in Hydaburg, Alaska
- KICW in Ottumwa, Iowa
- KISU in Pocatello, Idaho
- KIVM in Fredericksburg, Texas
- KJRF in Lawton, Oklahoma
- KKLP in Perris, California
- KKRD in Enid, Oklahoma
- KLCF in Truth or Consequence, New Mexico
- KLDV in Morrison, Colorado
- KLEU in Lewistown, Montana
- KLHY in Kailua, Hawaii
- KLPR in Kearney, Nebraska
- KLSU in Baton Rouge, Louisiana
- KLVY in Fairmead, California
- KLXG in Grants Pass, Oregon
- KMRA in Monahans, Texas
- KMTC in Russellville, Arkansas
- KMUD in Garberville, California
- KMWY in Jackson, Wyoming
- KMZL in Missoula, Montana
- KNLB in Lake Havasu City, Arizona
- KNLY in New Waverly, Texas
- KNOG in Nogales, Arizona
- KNOW in Minneapolis-Saint Paul, Minnesota
- KNSB in Bettendorf, Iowa
- KNSK in Fort Dodge, Iowa
- KODH-LP in Garryowen, Montana
- KOFG in Cody, Wyoming
- KOJO (FM) in Lake Charles, Louisiana
- KOLJ-FM in Wannaska, Minnesota
- KPBX in Spokane, Washington
- KQOA in Morton, Texas
- KQPD in Ardmore, Oklahoma
- KQXE in Eastland, Texas
- KRCG-FM in Santa Rosa, California
- KROH in Port Townsend, Washington
- KROV in Oroville, California
- KSGR in Portland, Texas
- KSJI in St. Joseph, Missouri
- KSKA in Anchorage, Alaska
- KSMU in Springfield, Missouri
- KSUU in Cedar City, Utah
- KTAI in Kingsville, Texas
- KTJC in Kelso, Washington
- KTMK in Tillamook, Oregon
- KTNE-FM in Alliance, Nebraska
- KTSD in Reliance, South Dakota
- KTWP in Twisp, Washington
- KUCV in Lincoln, Nebraska
- KVER (FM) in El Paso, Texas
- KVKL in Las Vegas, Nevada
- KVNG in Eloy, Arizona
- KVUJ in Lake Jackson, Texas
- KWAX in Eugene, Oregon
- KWSB in Gunnison, Colorado
- KWTS in Canyon, Texas
- KXLC in La Crescent, Minnesota
- KXRY in Portland, Oregon
- KXUL in Monroe, Louisiana
- KYAY in San Carlos, Arizona
- KYPL in Yakima, Washington
- KZNR in Red Dog Mine, Alaska
- KZTX in Encino, Texas
- WABR in Tifton, Georgia
- WAJH in Birmingham, Alabama
- WAQU in Selma, Alabama
- WASM in Natchez, Mississippi
- WAXU in Troy, Alabama
- WAYU in Steele, Alabama
- WBEK in Kankakee, Illinois
- WBFK in Hiseville, Kentucky
- WBOR in Brunswick, Maine
- WBSH in Hagerstown, Indiana
- WCOX in Bedford, Pennsylvania
- WCYT in Lafayette Township, Indiana
- WDBX in Carbondale, Illinois
- WDDE in Dover, Delaware
- WEBK in Society Hill, South Carolina
- WEDM in Indianapolis, Indiana
- WEGL in Auburn, Alabama
- WFLM in Fort Pierce, Florida
- WFMU in East Orange, New Jersey
- WFPW in Battens Crossroads, Alabama
- WFUM in Flint, Michigan
- WGCS in Goshen, Indiana
- WGDR in Plainfield, Vermont
- WGGL in Houghton, Michigan
- WGTD in Kenosha, Wisconsin
- WGXM in Calypso, North Carolina
- WHCE in Highland Springs, Virginia
- WHFC in Bel Air, Maryland
- WHMF in Marianna, Florida
- WHMO (FM) in Madison, Indiana
- WHSK in Bloomsburg, Pennsylvania
- WHVP in Hudson, New York
- WIBI in Carlinville, Illinois
- WILV in Loves Park, Illinois
- WIRE (FM) in Lebanon, Indiana
- WJEP in Cusseta, Georgia
- WJJW in North Adams, Massachusetts
- WJNH in Conway, New Hampshire
- WKAO in Ashland, Kentucky
- WKCS in Knoxville, Tennessee
- WKER-FM in McCormick, South Carolina
- WKES in Lakeland, Florida
- WKNO in Memphis, Tennessee
- WMHU in Cold Brook, New York
- WMPF-LP in Rumford, Maine
- WMSS in Middletown, Pennsylvania
- WMSV in Starkville, Mississippi
- WMUA in Amherst, Massachusetts
- WNAN in Nantucket, Massachusetts
- WNSB in Norfolk, Virginia
- WNXP in Nashville, Tennessee
- WOKD in Danville, Virginia
- WOLW in Cadillac, Michigan
- WOSB in Marion, Ohio
- WOSE in Coshocton, Ohio
- WOSX in Granville, Ohio
- WOVM in Appleton, Wisconsin
- WPCJ in Pittsford, Michigan
- WPIB in Bluefield, West Virginia
- WPSM in Fort Walton Beach, Florida
- WQHD-LP in Aguada-Aguadilla, Puerto Rico
- WREK in Atlanta, Georgia
- WRMC in Middlebury, Vermont
- WRMU in Alliance, Ohio
- WRNV in Norco, Louisiana
- WRPV in Ridgway, Pennsylvania
- WRSH in Rockingham, North Carolina
- WRTY in Jackson Township, Pennsylvania
- WRUW in Cleveland, Ohio
- WRWX in Winchendon, Massachusetts
- WSAJ in Grove City, Pennsylvania
- WSHU in Fairfield, Connecticut
- WSPN in Saratoga Springs, New York
- WSQE in Corning, New York
- WSVH in Savannah, Georgia
- WTJU in Charlottesville, Virginia
- WTKL in North Dartmouth, Massachusetts
- WTRM in Winchester, Virginia
- WTSC in Potsdam, New York
- WTSE in Benton, Tennessee
- WUJC in Saint Marks, Florida
- WUMM in Machias, Maine
- WUNW-FM in Welcome, North Carolina
- WVNH in Concord, New Hampshire
- WVNK in Manchester, Vermont
- WVRP in Roanoke Rapids, North Carolina
- WVUB in Vincennes, Indiana
- WWNJ in Toms River Township, New Jersey
- WXEV in Bradford, Rhode Island
- WYBH in Fayetteville, North Carolina
- WYFG in Gaffney, South Carolina
- WYGS in Columbus, Indiana
- WZBT in Gettysburg, Pennsylvania
- WZGO in Aurora, North Carolina
- WZTH in Tusculum, Tennessee
