= List of FM radio stations in the United States by call sign (initial letters WG–WJ) =

This is a list of FM radio stations in the United States having call signs beginning with the letters WG through WJ. Low-power FM radio stations, those with designations such as WGAF-LP, have not been included in this list.

== WG-- ==
Callsign	Frequency	City of license
WGAC-FM	95.1 FM	Harlem, Georgia
WGAO	88.3 FM	Franklin, Massachusetts
WGAR-FM	99.5 FM	Cleveland, Ohio
WGAY	105.7 FM	Sugarloaf Key, Florida
WGBE	90.9 FM	Bryan, Ohio
WGBF-FM	103.1 FM	Henderson, Kentucky
WGBG-FM	107.7 FM	Fruitland, Maryland
WGBH	89.7 FM	Boston, Massachusetts
WGBJ	102.3 FM	Auburn, Indiana
WGBK	88.5 FM	Glenview, Illinois
WGBL	96.7 FM	Gulfport, Mississippi
WGBQ	91.9 FM	Lynchburg, Tennessee
WGBT	91.3 FM	Tomahawk, Wisconsin
WGBZ	88.3 FM	Ocean City, Maryland
WGCA	88.5 FM	Quincy, Illinois
WGCF	89.3 FM	Paducah, Kentucky
WGCI-FM	107.5 FM	Chicago
WGCK-FM	99.7 FM	Coeburn, Virginia
WGCM-FM	102.3 FM	Gulfport, Mississippi
WGCO	98.3 FM	Midway, Georgia
WGCP	91.9 FM	Cadillac, Michigan
WGCQ	98.7 FM	Hayti, Missouri
WGCS	91.1 FM	Goshen, Indiana
WGCU-FM	90.1 FM	Ft. Myers, Florida
WGCY	106.3 FM	Gibson City, Illinois
WGDE	91.9 FM	Defiance, Ohio
WGDH	91.7 FM	Hardwick, Vermont
WGDN-FM	103.1 FM	Gladwin, Michigan
WGDQ	93.1 FM	Sumrall, Mississippi
WGDR	91.1 FM	Plainfield, Vermont
WGEE	93.5 FM	New London, Wisconsin
WGEL	101.7 FM	Greenville, Illinois
WGEM-FM	105.1 FM	Quincy, Illinois
WGEN-FM	88.9 FM	Monee, Illinois
WGER	106.3 FM	Saginaw, Michigan
WGEX	97.3 FM	Bainbridge, Georgia
WGFA-FM	94.1 FM	Watseka, Illinois
WGFB	103.1 FM	Rockton, Illinois
WGFE	95.5 FM	Glen Arbor, Michigan
WGFG	105.3 FM	Branchville, South Carolina
WGFJ	94.1 FM	Cross Hill, South Carolina
WGFM	105.1 FM	Cheboygan, Michigan
WGFN	98.1 FM	Glen Arbor, Michigan
WGFR	92.7 FM	Glens Falls, New York
WGFW	88.7 FM	Drakes Branch, Virginia
WGFX	104.5 FM	Gallatin, Tennessee
WGGC	95.1 FM	Bowling Green, Kentucky
WGGE	99.1 FM	Parkersburg, West Virginia
WGGL-FM	91.1 FM	Houghton, Michigan
WGGN	97.7 FM	Castalia, Ohio
WGGY	101.3 FM	Scranton, Pennsylvania
WGH-FM	97.3 FM	Newport News, Virginia
WGHJ	105.3 FM	Fair Bluff, North Carolina
WGHL	105.1 FM	Shepherdsville, Kentucky
WGHN-FM	92.1 FM	Grand Haven, Michigan
WGHR	106.3 FM	Spring Hill, Florida
WGHW	88.1 FM	Lockwoods Folly Town, North Carolina
WGIB	91.9 FM	Birmingham, Alabama
WGIE	92.7 FM	Clarksburg, West Virginia
WGIR-FM	101.1 FM	Manchester, New Hampshire
WGIW	89.7 FM	Pilot Mountain, North Carolina
WGJC	97.1 FM	University Park, Pennsylvania
WGJU	91.3 FM	East Tawas, Michigan
WGKC	105.9 FM	Mahomet, Illinois
WGKL	105.5 FM	Gladstone, Michigan
WGKR	105.3 FM	Grand Gorge, New York
WGKS	96.9 FM	Paris, Kentucky
WGKV	101.7 FM	Pulaski, New York
WGKX	105.9 FM	Memphis, Tennessee
WGKY	95.9 FM	Wickliffe, Kentucky
WGLA	90.5 FM	Nashville, Georgia
WGLC-FM	100.1 FM	Mendota, Illinois
WGLD-FM	93.9 FM	Conway, South Carolina
WGLE	90.7 FM	Lima, Ohio
WGLF	104.1 FM	Tallahassee, Florida
WGLG	89.9 FM	Swanton, Vermont
WGLH	103.9 FM	Hawkinsville, Georgia
WGLI	98.7 FM	Hancock, Michigan
WGLM-FM	106.3 FM	Lakeview, Michigan
WGLO	95.5 FM	Pekin, Illinois
WGLQ	97.1 FM	Escanaba, Michigan
WGLR-FM	97.7 FM	Lancaster, Wisconsin
WGLS-FM	89.7 FM	Glassboro, New Jersey
WGLT	89.1 FM	Normal, Illinois
WGLU	102.5 FM	Warner Robins, Georgia
WGLV	91.7 FM	Woodstock, Vermont
WGLX-FM	103.3 FM	Wisconsin Rapids, Wisconsin
WGLY-FM	91.5 FM	Bolton, Vermont
WGLZ	91.5 FM	West Liberty, West Virginia
WGMC	90.1 FM	Greece, New York
WGMD	92.7 FM	Rehoboth Beach, Delaware
WGMF-FM	103.9 FM	Dushore, Pennsylvania
WGMG	102.1 FM	Crawford, Georgia
WGMK	106.3 FM	Donalsonville, Georgia
WGML	88.1 FM	Vanceboro, North Carolina
WGMO	95.3 FM	Spooner, Wisconsin
WGMR	91.3 FM	Effingham, Illinois
WGMS	89.1 FM	Hagerstown, Maryland
WGMT	97.7 FM	Lyndon, Vermont
WGMV	106.3 FM	Stephenson, Michigan
WGMX	94.3 FM	Marathon, Florida
WGMY	107.1 FM	Thomasville, Georgia
WGMZ	93.1 FM	Glencoe, Alabama
WGNA-FM	107.7 FM	Albany, New York
WGNB	89.3 FM	Zeeland, Michigan
WGNC-FM	88.5 FM	Constantine, Michigan
WGNE-FM	99.9 FM	Middleburg, Florida
WGNG	106.3 FM	Tchula, Mississippi
WGNH	94.9 FM	South Webster, Ohio
WGNI	102.7 FM	Wilmington, North Carolina
WGNJ	89.3 FM	St. Joseph, Illinois
WGNK	88.3 FM	Pennsuco, Florida
WGNL	104.3 FM	Greenwood, Mississippi
WGNN	102.5 FM	Fisher, Illinois
WGNR-FM	97.9 FM	Anderson, Indiana
WGNV	88.5 FM	Milladore, Wisconsin
WGNW	99.9 FM	Cornell, Wisconsin
WGNX	96.7 FM	Colchester, Illinois
WGNY-FM	98.9 FM	Rosendale, New York
WGOD-FM	97.9 FM	Charlotte Amalie, Virgin Islands
WGOG	101.7 FM	Walhalla, South Carolina
WGOJ	105.5 FM	Conneaut, Ohio
WGOV-FM	96.7 FM	Valdosta, Georgia
WGOW-FM	102.3 FM	Soddy-Daisy, Tennessee
WGPB	97.7 FM	Rome, Georgia
WGPH	91.5 FM	Vidalia, Georgia
WGPO	90.1 FM	Grand Portage, Minnesota
WGPR	107.5 FM	Detroit, Michigan
WGRC	91.3 FM	Lewisburg, Pennsylvania
WGRD-FM	97.9 FM	Grand Rapids, Michigan
WGRE	91.5 FM	Greencastle, Indiana
WGRF	96.9 FM	Buffalo, New York
WGRH	88.5 FM	Hinckley, Minnesota
WGRK-FM	103.1 FM	Greensburg, Kentucky
WGRM-FM	93.9 FM	Greenwood, Mississippi
WGRN	89.5 FM	Greenville, Illinois
WGRQ	95.9 FM	Fairview Beach, Virginia
WGRR	103.5 FM	Hamilton, Ohio
WGRS	91.5 FM	Guilford, Connecticut
WGRT	102.3 FM	Port Huron, Michigan
WGRW	90.7 FM	Anniston, Alabama
WGRX	104.5 FM	Falmouth, Virginia
WGRY-FM	101.1 FM	Roscommon, Michigan
WGSG	89.5 FM	Mayo, Florida
WGSK	90.1 FM	South Kent, Connecticut
WGSN	90.7 FM	Newport, Tennessee
WGSP-FM	102.3 FM	Pageland, South Carolina
WGSQ	94.7 FM	Cookeville, Tennessee
WGSS	89.3 FM	Copiague, New York
WGSU	89.3 FM	Geneseo, New York
WGSW	106.9 FM	Americus, Georgia
WGSX	104.3 FM	Lynn Haven, Florida
WGSY	100.1 FM	Phenix City, Alabama
WGTD	91.1 FM	Kenosha, Wisconsin
WGTE-FM	91.3 FM	Toledo, Ohio
WGTF	89.5 FM	Dothan, Alabama
WGTH-FM	105.5 FM	Richlands, Virginia
WGTI	97.7 FM	Windsor, North Carolina
WGTL	104.7 FM	La Grange, North Carolina
WGTR	107.9 FM	Bucksport, South Carolina
WGTS	91.9 FM	Takoma Park, Maryland
WGTT	91.5 FM	Emeralda, Florida
WGTX-FM	102.3 FM	Truro, Massachusetts
WGTY	107.7 FM	Gettysburg, Pennsylvania
WGTZ	92.9 FM	Eaton, Ohio
WGUC	90.9 FM	Cincinnati
WGUF	98.9 FM	Marco, Florida
WGUO	94.9 FM	Reserve, Louisiana
WGUR	88.9 FM	Milledgeville, Georgia
WGUS-FM	102.7 FM	New Ellenton, South Carolina
WGVE-FM	88.7 FM	Gary, Indiana
WGVS-FM	95.3 FM	Whitehall, Michigan
WGVU-FM	88.5 FM	Allendale, Michigan
WGVX	105.1 FM	Lakeville, Minnesota
WGWM	91.5 FM	Trevet, Maine
WGWR	88.1 FM	Liberty, New York
WGWS	88.1 FM	St. Mary's City, Maryland
WGXC	90.7 FM	Acra, New York
WGXL	92.3 FM	Hanover, New Hampshire
WGXM	91.1 FM	Calypso, North Carolina
WGXO	90.9 FM	Magnolia, North Carolina
WGY-FM	103.1 FM	Albany, New York
WGYE	102.7 FM	Mannington, West Virginia
WGYI	98.5 FM	Oil City, Pennsylvania
WGYL	93.7 FM	Vero Beach, Florida
WGYY	100.3 FM	Meadville, Pennsylvania
WGZB-FM	96.5 FM	Lanesville, Indiana
WGZR	88.9 FM	Alpena, Michigan
WGZS	89.1 FM	Cloquet, Minnesota
WGZZ	94.3 FM	Waverly, Alabama

== WH-- ==
Callsign	Frequency	City of license
WHAA	89.1 FM	Adams, Wisconsin
WHAB	89.1 FM	Acton, Massachusetts
WHAD	90.7 FM	Delafield, Wisconsin
WHAI	98.3 FM	Greenfield, Massachusetts
WHAJ	104.5 FM	Bluefield, West Virginia
WHAK-FM	99.9 FM	Rogers City, Michigan
WHAL-FM	95.7 FM	Horn Lake, Mississippi
WHAY	98.3 FM	Whitley City, Kentucky
WHAZ-FM	97.5 FM	Hoosick Falls, New York
WHBC-FM	94.1 FM	Canton, Ohio
WHBE-FM	105.7 FM	Eminence, Kentucky
WHBJ	99.1 FM	Barnwell, South Carolina
WHBM	90.3 FM	Park Falls, Wisconsin
WHBP	90.1 FM	Harbor Springs, Michigan
WHBQ-FM	107.5 FM	Germantown, Tennessee
WHBR-FM	103.1 FM	Parkersburg, West Virginia
WHBT-FM	92.1 FM	Moyock, North Carolina
WHBX	96.1 FM	Tallahassee, Florida
WHBZ	106.5 FM	Sheboygan Falls, Wisconsin
WHCB	91.5 FM	Bristol, Tennessee
WHCC	105.1 FM	Ellettsville, Indiana
WHCE	91.1 FM	Highland Springs, Virginia
WHCF	88.5 FM	Bangor, Maine
WHCH	99.9 FM	Custer, Michigan
WHCJ	90.3 FM	Savannah, Georgia
WHCL-FM	88.7 FM	Clinton, New York
WHCM	88.3 FM	Palatine, Illinois
WHCN	105.9 FM	Hartford, Connecticut
WHCP-FM	91.7 FM	Trappe, Maryland
WHCR-FM	90.3 FM	New York City
WHCY	106.3 FM	Blairstown, New Jersey
WHDD-FM	91.9 FM	Sharon, Connecticut
WHDG	97.5 FM	Rhinelander, Wisconsin
WHDI	91.9 FM	Sister Bay, Wisconsin
WHDQ	106.1 FM	Claremont, New Hampshire
WHDX	99.9 FM	Waves, North Carolina
WHDZ	101.5 FM	Buxton, North Carolina
WHEB	100.3 FM	Portsmouth, New Hampshire
WHEI	88.9 FM	Tiffin, Ohio
WHEL	93.7 FM	Sanibel, Florida
WHEM	91.3 FM	Eau Claire, Wisconsin
WHET	97.7 FM	West Frankfort, Illinois
WHEY	88.9 FM	North Muskegon, Michigan
WHFC	91.1 FM	Bel Air, Maryland
WHFG	91.3 FM	Broussard, Louisiana
WHFH	88.5 FM	Flossmoor, Illinois
WHFI	106.7 FM	Lindside, West Virginia
WHFM	95.3 FM	Southampton, New York
WHFR	89.3 FM	Dearborn, Michigan
WHFV	107.1 FM	Shenandoah, Virginia
WHFW	89.7 FM	Winchester, Virginia
WHFX	107.7 FM	Darien, Georgia
WHGL-FM	100.3 FM	Canton, Pennsylvania
WHGN	91.9 FM	Crystal River, Florida
WHGO	91.3 FM	Hertford, North Carolina
WHGV	99.5 FM	LaCrosse, Florida
WHHB	99.9 FM	Holliston, Massachusetts
WHHD	98.3 FM	Clearwater, South Carolina
WHHG	92.3 FM	Milan, Tennessee
WHHH	100.9 FM	Speedway, Indiana
WHHI	91.3 FM	Highland, Iowa County, Wisconsin
WHHM-FM	107.7 FM	Henderson, Tennessee
WHHN	88.1 FM	Hollidaysburg, Pennsylvania
WHHR	92.1 FM	Vienna, Georgia
WHHS	99.9 FM	Havertown, Pennsylvania
WHHT	103.7 FM	Cave City, Kentucky
WHHY-FM	101.9 FM	Montgomery, Alabama
WHHZ	100.5 FM	Newberry, Florida
WHID	88.1 FM	Green Bay, Wisconsin
WHIF	91.3 FM	Palatka, Florida
WHIJ	88.1 FM	Ocala, Florida
WHIL	91.3 FM	Mobile, Alabama
WHIO-FM	95.7 FM	Pleasant Hill, Ohio
WHIZ-FM	92.7 FM	South Zanesville, Ohio
WHJB	107.1 FM	Greensburg, Pennsylvania
WHJE	91.3 FM	Carmel, Indiana
WHJL	88.1 FM	Merrill, Wisconsin
WHJM	88.7 FM	Anna, Ohio
WHJR	88.3 FM	Murphysboro, Illinois
WHJT	93.5 FM	Clinton, Mississippi
WHJX	106.5 FM	Ponte Vedra Beach, Florida
WHJY	94.1 FM	Providence, Rhode Island
WHKB	102.3 FM	Houghton, Michigan
WHKC	91.5 FM	Columbus, Ohio
WHKF	99.3 FM	Harrisburg, Pennsylvania
WHKL	106.9 FM	Crenshaw, Mississippi
WHKO	99.1 FM	Dayton, Ohio
WHKQ	92.3 FM	Louisa, Kentucky
WHKR	102.7 FM	Rockledge, Florida
WHKS	94.9 FM	Port Allegany, Pennsylvania
WHKU	91.9 FM	Proctorville, Ohio
WHKV	106.1 FM	Sylvester, Georgia
WHKX	106.3 FM	Bluefield, Virginia
WHLA	90.3 FM	La Crosse, Wisconsin
WHLC	104.5 FM	Highlands, North Carolina
WHLF	95.3 FM	South Boston, Virginia
WHLG	101.3 FM	Port St. Lucie, Florida
WHLH	95.5 FM	Jackson, Mississippi
WHLJ-FM	97.5 FM	Statenville, Georgia
WHLK	106.5 FM	Cleveland, Ohio
WHLP	89.9 FM	Hanna, Indiana
WHLQ	105.5 FM	Lawrenceville, Virginia
WHLR	95.9 FM	Seelyville, Indiana
WHLW	104.3 FM	Luverne, Alabama
WHMA-FM	95.3 FM	Alexandria, Alabama
WHMC-FM	90.1 FM	Conway, South Carolina
WHMD	107.1 FM	Hammond, Louisiana
WHME	103.1 FM	South Bend, Indiana
WHMF	91.1 FM	Marianna, Florida
WHMH-FM	101.7 FM	Sauk Rapids, Minnesota
WHMI-FM	93.5 FM	Howell, Michigan
WHMJ	99.3 FM	Franklin, Pennsylvania
WHMO	91.1 FM	Madison, Indiana
WHMS-FM	97.5 FM	Champaign, Illinois
WHMX	105.7 FM	Lincoln, Maine
WHNA	92.3 FM	Riverside, Pennsylvania
WHNB	104.5 FM	Hancock, New York
WHND	89.7 FM	Sister Bay, Wisconsin
WHNJ	95.7 FM	Big Pine Key, Florida
WHNN	96.1 FM	Bay City, Michigan
WHNY-FM	104.7 FM	Henry, Tennessee
WHOD	94.5 FM	Jackson, Alabama
WHOF	101.7 FM	North Canton, Ohio
WHOG-FM	95.7 FM	Ormond-By-The-Sea, Florida
WHOJ	91.9 FM	Terre Haute, Indiana
WHOM	94.9 FM	Mount Washington, New Hampshire
WHOP-FM	98.7 FM	Hopkinsville, Kentucky
WHOT-FM	101.1 FM	Youngstown, Ohio
WHOU-FM	100.1 FM	Houlton, Maine
WHOV	88.1 FM	Hampton, Virginia
WHPA	89.7 FM	Macomb, Illinois
WHPC	90.3 FM	Garden City, New York
WHPD	92.1 FM	Dowagiac, Michigan
WHPE-FM	95.5 FM	High Point, North Carolina
WHPI	101.1 FM	Glasford, Illinois
WHPJ	88.7 FM	Hibbing, Minnesota
WHPK	88.5 FM	Chicago
WHPL	89.9 FM	West Lafayette, Indiana
WHPO	100.9 FM	Hoopeston, Illinois
WHPR-FM	88.1 FM	Highland Park, Michigan
WHPT	102.5 FM	Sarasota, Florida
WHPY-FM	94.5 FM	Bellevue, Tennessee
WHPZ	96.9 FM	Bremen, Indiana
WHQA	103.1 FM	Honea Path, South Carolina
WHQB	90.5 FM	Gray Court, South Carolina
WHQC	96.1 FM	Shelby, North Carolina
WHQG	102.9 FM	Milwaukee, Wisconsin
WHQQ	98.9 FM	Neoga, Illinois
WHQR	91.3 FM	Wilmington, North Carolina
WHQT	105.1 FM	Coral Gables, Florida
WHQX	107.7 FM	Gary, West Virginia
WHRB	95.3 FM	Cambridge, Massachusetts
WHRD	106.9 FM	Freeport, Illinois
WHRE	91.9 FM	Eastville, Virginia
WHRF	98.3 FM	Belle Haven, Virginia
WHRG	88.5 FM	Gloucester Point, Virginia
WHRJ	89.9 FM	Washington Court House, Virginia
WHRK	97.1 FM	Memphis, Tennessee
WHRL	88.1 FM	Emporia, Virginia
WHRM	90.9 FM	Wausau, Wisconsin
WHRO-FM	90.3 FM	Norfolk, Virginia
WHRP	94.1 FM	Gurley, Alabama
WHRQ	88.1 FM	Sandusky, Ohio
WHRS	91.7 FM	Cookeville, Tennessee
WHRT-FM	91.9 FM	Cokesbury, South Carolina
WHRV	89.5 FM	Norfolk, Virginia
WHRW	90.5 FM	Binghamton, New York
WHRX	90.1 FM	Nassawadox, Virginia
WHSA	89.9 FM	Brule, Wisconsin
WHSB	107.7 FM	Alpena, Michigan
WHSD	88.5 FM	Hinsdale, Illinois
WHSF	89.9 FM	Rhinelander, Wisconsin
WHSK	91.1 FM	Bloomsburg, Pennsylvania
WHSL	107.7 FM	Lisman, Alabama
WHSM-FM	101.1 FM	Hayward, Wisconsin
WHSN	89.3 FM	Bangor, Maine
WHSS	89.5 FM	Hamilton, Ohio
WHST	94.1 FM	Pigeon, Michigan
WHSX	99.1 FM	Edmonton, Kentucky
WHTA	107.9 FM	Hampton, Georgia
WHTE-FM	101.9 FM	Ruckersville, Virginia
WHTF	104.9 FM	Havana, Florida
WHTI	105.7 FM	Salem, West Virginia
WHTL-FM	102.3 FM	Whitehall, Wisconsin
WHTO	106.7 FM	Iron Mountain, Michigan
WHTP-FM	104.7 FM	Kennebunkport, Maine
WHTQ	96.7 FM	Whiting, Wisconsin
WHTS	105.3 FM	Coopersville, Michigan
WHTT-FM	104.1 FM	Buffalo, New York
WHTZ	100.3 FM	Newark, New Jersey
WHUD	100.7 FM	Peekskill, New York
WHUG	101.9 FM	Jamestown, New York
WHUK	102.3 FM	Crozet, Virginia
WHUN-FM	103.5 FM	Huntingdon, Pennsylvania
WHUR-FM	96.3 FM	Washington, D.C.
WHUS	91.7 FM	Storrs, Connecticut
WHVC	102.5 FM	Rhinebeck, New York
WHVE	92.7 FM	Russell Springs, Kentucky
WHVK	103.5 FM	New Hope, Alabama
WHVM	91.9 FM	Owego, New York
WHVP	91.1 FM	Hudson, New York
WHVT	90.5 FM	Clyde, Ohio
WHVY	89.5 FM	Coshocton, Ohio
WHWA	104.7 FM	Washburn, Wisconsin
WHWC	88.3 FM	Menomonie, Wisconsin
WHWG	89.9 FM	Trout Lake, Michigan
WHWK	98.1 FM	Binghamton, New York
WHWL	95.7 FM	Marquette, Michigan
WHWN	88.3 FM	Painesville, Ohio
WHWY	98.1 FM	Holt, Florida
WHXR	106.3 FM	Scarborough, Maine
WHXT	103.9 FM	Orangeburg, South Carolina
WHYA	101.1 FM	Mashpee, Massachusetts
WHYB	103.7 FM	Menominee, Michigan
WHYI-FM	100.7 FM	Fort Lauderdale, Florida
WHYN-FM	93.1 FM	Springfield, Massachusetts
WHYT	88.1 FM	Goodland Township, Michigan
WHYU-FM	89.1 FM	Meyersdale, Pennsylvania
WHYY-FM	90.9 FM	Philadelphia
WHYZ	91.1 FM	Palm Coast, Florida
WHZN	88.3 FM	New Whiteland, Indiana
WHZR	103.7 FM	Royal Center, Indiana
WHZT	98.1 FM	Williamston, South Carolina
WHZZ	101.7 FM	Lansing, Michigan

== WI-- ==
Callsign	Frequency	City of license
WIAA	88.7 FM	Interlochen, Michigan
WIAB	88.5 FM	Mackinaw City, Michigan
WIAD	94.7 FM	Bethesda, Maryland
WIAL	94.1 FM	Elk Mound, Wisconsin
WIBA-FM	101.5 FM	Sauk City, Wisconsin
WIBB-FM	97.9 FM	Fort Valley, Georgia
WIBC	93.1 FM	Indianapolis, Indiana
WIBF	92.5 FM	Mexico, Pennsylvania
WIBG-FM	94.3 FM	Avalon, New Jersey
WIBI	91.1 FM	Carlinville, Illinois
WIBL	107.7 FM	Fairbury, Illinois
WIBN	98.1 FM	Earl Park, Indiana
WIBT	97.9 FM	Greenville, Mississippi
WIBV	102.1 FM	Mount Vernon, Illinois
WIBW-FM	94.5 FM	Topeka, Kansas
WIBZ	95.5 FM	Wedgefield, South Carolina
WICA	91.5 FM	Traverse City, Michigan
WICB	91.7 FM	Ithaca, New York
WICC-FM	95.9 FM	Southport, Connecticut
WICL	95.9 FM	Williamsport, Maryland
WICN	90.5 FM	Worcester, Massachusetts
WICO-FM	101.1 FM	Snow Hill, Maryland
WICR	88.7 FM	Indianapolis, Indiana
WICU-FM	92.7 FM	Lawrence Park, Pennsylvania
WIDA-FM	90.5 FM	Carolina, Puerto Rico
WIDI	98.3 FM	Quebradillas, Puerto Rico
WIDL	92.1 FM	Cass City, Michigan
WIDR	89.1 FM	Kalamazoo, Michigan
WIFC	95.5 FM	Wausau, Wisconsin
WIFE-FM	94.3 FM	Rushville, Indiana
WIFF	90.1 FM	Windsor, New York
WIFM-FM	100.9 FM	Elkin, North Carolina
WIFO-FM	105.5 FM	Jesup, Georgia
WIFT	102.1 FM	Du Bois, Pennsylvania
WIFX-FM	94.3 FM	Jenkins, Kentucky
WIFY	93.7 FM	Addison, Vermont
WIGH	88.7 FM	Jackson, Tennessee
WIGO-FM	104.9 FM	White Stone, Virginia
WIGW	90.3 FM	Eustis, Florida
WIGY-FM	100.7 FM	Mexico, Maine
WIHB-FM	96.5 FM	Gray, Georgia
WIHC	97.9 FM	Newberry, Michigan
WIHG	105.7 FM	Rockwood, Tennessee
WIHM-FM	88.1 FM	Harrisburg, Illinois
WIHN	96.7 FM	Normal, Illinois
WIHS	104.9 FM	Middletown, Connecticut
WIHT	99.5 FM	Washington, D.C.
WIID	88.1 FM	Rodanthe, North Carolina
WIII	99.9 FM	Cortland, New York
WIIL	95.1 FM	Union Grove, Wisconsin
WIIS	106.9 FM	Key West, Florida
WIIT	88.9 FM	Chicago
WIIZ	97.9 FM	Blackville, South Carolina
WIJV	92.7 FM	Harriman, Tennessee
WIKB-FM	99.1 FM	Iron River, Michigan
WIKG	92.1 FM	Mercersburg, Pennsylvania
WIKI	95.3 FM	Carrollton, Kentucky
WIKK	103.5 FM	Newton, Illinois
WIKL	101.7 FM	Elwood, Indiana
WIKQ	103.1 FM	Tusculum, Tennessee
WIKS	101.9 FM	New Bern, North Carolina
WIKV	89.3 FM	Plymouth, Indiana
WIKX	92.9 FM	Charlotte Harbor, Florida
WIKY-FM	104.1 FM	Evansville, Indiana
WIKZ	95.1 FM	Chambersburg, Pennsylvania
WIL-FM	92.3 FM	St. Louis, Missouri
WILA	100.1 FM	Live Oak, Florida
WILB-FM	89.5 FM	Boardman, Ohio
WILE-FM	97.7 FM	Byesville, Ohio
WILF	88.9 FM	Monroeville, Alabama
WILI-FM	98.3 FM	Willimantic, Connecticut
WILK-FM	103.1 FM	Avoca, Pennsylvania
WILL-FM	90.9 FM	Urbana, Illinois
WILN	105.9 FM	Panama City, Florida
WILP	98.1 FM	Cuba, Illinois
WILQ	105.1 FM	Williamsport, Pennsylvania
WILT	103.7 FM	Wrightsville Beach, North Carolina
WILV	91.1 FM	Loves Park, Illinois
WILZ	104.5 FM	Saginaw, Michigan
WIMB	89.1 FM	Murphysboro, Illinois
WIMC	103.9 FM	Crawfordsville, Indiana
WIMI	99.7 FM	Ironwood, Michigan
WIMK	93.1 FM	Iron Mountain, Michigan
WIMT	102.1 FM	Lima, Ohio
WIMV	89.3 FM	Owingsville, Kentucky
WIMX	95.7 FM	Gibsonburg, Ohio
WIMZ-FM	103.5 FM	Knoxville, Tennessee
WINC-FM	105.5 FM	Berryville, Virginia
WINH	91.9 FM	Hinckley, Minnesota
WINK-FM	96.9 FM	Fort Myers, Florida
WINL	98.5 FM	Linden, Alabama
WINN	104.9 FM	Columbus, Indiana
WINO	91.9 FM	Watkins Glen, New York
WINQ-FM	98.7 FM	Winchester, New Hampshire
WINS-FM	92.3 FM	New York City
WINU	104.9 FM	Altamont, New York
WINX-FM	94.3 FM	St. Michaels, Maryland
WIOA	99.9 FM	San Juan, Puerto Rico
WIOB	97.5 FM	Mayagüez, Puerto Rico
WIOC	105.1 FM	Ponce, Puerto Rico
WIOE-FM	101.1 FM	South Whitley, Indiana
WIOG	102.5 FM	Bay City, Michigan
WIOK	107.5 FM	Falmouth, Kentucky
WIOL-FM	95.7 FM	Waverly Hall, Georgia
WIOQ	102.1 FM	Philadelphia
WIOT	104.7 FM	Toledo, Ohio
WIOV-FM	105.1 FM	Ephrata, Pennsylvania
WIOX	91.3 FM	Roxbury, New York
WIOZ-FM	102.5 FM	Southern Pines, North Carolina
WIP-FM	94.1 FM	Philadelphia
WIPA	89.3 FM	Pittsfield, Illinois
WIPK	94.5 FM	Calhoun, Georgia
WIPR-FM	91.3 FM	San Juan, Puerto Rico
WIQH	88.3 FM	Concord, Massachusetts
WIQI	95.9 FM	Watseka, Illinois
WIQO-FM	100.9 FM	Forest, Virginia
WIQQ	102.1 FM	Leland, Mississippi
WIQR	88.7 FM	Lexington, Virginia
WIRC	89.3 FM	Ely, Minnesota
WIRE	91.1 FM	Lebanon, Indiana
WIRI	105.5 FM	Nekoosa, Wisconsin
WIRK	103.1 FM	Indiantown, Florida
WIRN	92.5 FM	Buhl, Minnesota
WIRO	107.1 FM	Ironton, Ohio
WIRQ	104.7 FM	Rochester, New York
WIRR	90.9 FM	Virginia-Hibbing, Minnesota
WIRX	107.1 FM	St. Joseph, Michigan
WISE-FM	90.5 FM	Wise, Virginia
WISH-FM	98.9 FM	Galatia, Illinois
WISK-FM	98.7 FM	Americus, Georgia
WISM-FM	98.1 FM	Altoona, Wisconsin
WIST-FM	98.3 FM	Thomasville, North Carolina
WISU	89.7 FM	Terre Haute, Indiana
WITC	88.9 FM	Cazenovia, New York
WITF-FM	89.5 FM	Harrisburg, Pennsylvania
WITH	90.1 FM	Ithaca, New York
WITL-FM	100.7 FM	Lansing, Michigan
WITM	88.7 FM	West Frankfort, Illinois
WITR	89.7 FM	Henrietta, New York
WITT	91.9 FM	Zionsville, Indiana
WITZ-FM	104.7 FM	Jasper, Indiana
WIUM	91.3 FM	Macomb, Illinois
WIUP-FM	90.1 FM	Indiana, Pennsylvania
WIUS	88.3 FM	Macomb, Illinois
WIUW	89.5 FM	Warsaw, Illinois
WIVA-FM	100.3 FM	Aguadilla, Puerto Rico
WIVG	96.1 FM	Tunica, Mississippi
WIVH	90.1 FM	Christiansted, Virgin Islands
WIVI	102.1 FM	Cruz Bay, U.S. Virgin Islands
WIVK-FM	107.7 FM	Knoxville, Tennessee
WIVQ	103.3 FM	Spring Valley, Illinois
WIVR	101.7 FM	Kentland, Indiana
WIVY	96.3 FM	Morehead, Kentucky
WIWC	91.7 FM	Kokomo, Indiana
WIWF	96.9 FM	Charleston, South Carolina
WIXO	105.7 FM	Peoria, Illinois
WIXQ	91.7 FM	Millersville, Pennsylvania
WIXV	95.5 FM	Savannah, Georgia
WIXX	101.1 FM	Green Bay, Wisconsin
WIXY	100.3 FM	Champaign, Illinois
WIYY	97.9 FM	Baltimore, Maryland
WIZB	94.3 FM	Abbeville, Alabama
WIZF	101.1 FM	Erlanger, Kentucky
WIZM-FM	93.3 FM	La Crosse, Wisconsin
WIZN	106.7 FM	Vergennes, Vermont

== WJ-- ==
Callsign	Frequency	City of license
WJAA	96.3 FM	Austin, Indiana
WJAB	90.9 FM	Huntsville, Alabama
WJAD	103.5 FM	Leesburg, Georgia
WJAI	93.9 FM	Pearl, Mississippi
WJAQ	100.9 FM	Marianna, Florida
WJAW-FM	100.9 FM	McConnelsville, Ohio
WJAZ	91.7 FM	Summerdale, Pennsylvania
WJBD-FM	100.1 FM	Salem, Illinois
WJBE-FM	88.5 FM	Five Points, Alabama
WJBL	93.1 FM	Ladysmith, Wisconsin
WJBP	91.5 FM	Red Bank, Tennessee
WJBQ	97.9 FM	Portland, Maine
WJBT	93.3 FM	Callahan, Florida
WJBZ-FM	96.3 FM	Seymour, Tennessee
WJCA	102.1 FM	Albion, New York
WJCF-LP	102.7 FM	Doerun, Georgia
WJCH	91.9 FM	Joliet, Illinois
WJCI	102.9 FM	Huntington, Indiana
WJCK	88.3 FM	Piedmont, Alabama
WJCL-FM	96.5 FM	Savannah, Georgia
WJCO	91.3 FM	Montpelier, Indiana
WJCR-FM	90.1 FM	Upton, Kentucky
WJCS	89.3 FM	Allentown, Pennsylvania
WJCT-FM	89.9 FM	Jacksonville, Florida
WJCU	88.7 FM	University Heights, Ohio
WJCX	99.5 FM	Pittsfield, Maine
WJCY	91.5 FM	Cicero, Indiana
WJCZ	91.3 FM	Milford, Illinois
WJDB-FM	95.5 FM	Thomasville, Alabama
WJDF	97.3 FM	Orange, Massachusetts
WJDK-FM	95.7 FM	Seneca, Illinois
WJDQ	101.3 FM	Meridian, Mississippi
WJDR	98.3 FM	Prentiss, Mississippi
WJDS	88.7 FM	Sparta, Georgia
WJDT	106.5 FM	Rogersville, Tennessee
WJDX-FM	105.1 FM	Kosciusko, Mississippi
WJDZ	90.1 FM	Pastillo, Puerto Rico
WJEC	106.5 FM	Vernon, Alabama
WJEE	90.1 FM	Bolivar, Ohio
WJEF	91.9 FM	Lafayette, Indiana
WJEH-FM	93.1 FM	Racine, Ohio
WJEK	95.3 FM	Rantoul, Illinois
WJEL	89.3 FM	Indianapolis, Indiana
WJEN	105.3 FM	Killington, Vermont
WJEP	91.1 FM	Cusseta, Georgia
WJEQ	102.7 FM	Macomb, Illinois
WJES	100.9 FM	Maysville, Georgia
WJEZ	98.9 FM	Dwight, Illinois
WJFD-FM	97.3 FM	New Bedford, Massachusetts
WJFE	88.1 FM	Nantucket, Massachusetts
WJFF	90.5 FM	Jeffersonville, New York
WJFH	91.7 FM	Sebring, Florida
WJFK-FM	106.7 FM	Manassas, Virginia
WJFL	101.9 FM	Tennille, Georgia
WJFM	88.5 FM	Baton Rouge, Louisiana
WJFN-FM	100.5 FM	Goochland, Virginia
WJFR	88.7 FM	Jacksonville, Florida
WJFX	107.9 FM	New Haven, Indiana
WJGA-FM	92.1 FM	Jackson, Georgia
WJGK	103.1 FM	Newburgh, New York
WJGL	96.9 FM	Jacksonville, Florida
WJGM	105.7 FM	Baldwin, Florida
WJGO	102.9 FM	Tice, Florida
WJGS	91.5 FM	Norwood, Georgia
WJHC	107.5 FM	Jasper, Florida
WJHM	101.9 FM	Daytona Beach, Florida
WJHO	89.7 FM	Alexander City, Alabama
WJHS	91.5 FM	Columbia City, Indiana
WJHT	92.1 FM	Johnstown, Pennsylvania
WJHW	89.5 FM	Mayodan, North Carolina
WJIA	88.5 FM	Guntersville, Alabama
WJIC	91.7 FM	Zanesville, Ohio
WJIE-FM	88.5 FM	Okolona, Kentucky
WJIF	91.9 FM	Opp, Alabama
WJIK	89.3 FM	Fulton, Alabama
WJIM-FM	97.5 FM	Lansing, Michigan
WJIS	88.1 FM	Bradenton, Florida
WJIV	101.9 FM	Cherry Valley, New York
WJIZ-FM	96.3 FM	Albany, Georgia
WJJB-FM	96.3 FM	Gray, Maine
WJJE	89.1 FM	Delaware, Ohio
WJJF	94.9 FM	Montauk, New York
WJJH	96.7 FM	Ashland, Wisconsin
WJJJ	88.1 FM	Beckley, West Virginia
WJJK	104.5 FM	Indianapolis, Indiana
WJJL	90.7 FM	Carbon Hill, Alabama
WJJM-FM	94.3 FM	Lewisburg, Tennessee
WJJN	92.1 FM	Columbia, Alabama
WJJO	94.1 FM	Watertown, Wisconsin
WJJQ-FM	92.5 FM	Tomahawk, Wisconsin
WJJR	98.1 FM	Rutland, Vermont
WJJS	93.5 FM	Salem, Virginia
WJJW	91.1 FM	North Adams, Massachusetts
WJJX	102.7 FM	Appomattox, Virginia
WJJY-FM	106.7 FM	Brainerd, Minnesota
WJJZ	94.5 FM	Irasburg, Vermont
WJKA	90.1 FM	Jacksonville, North Carolina
WJKB	105.1 FM	Sheffield, Pennsylvania
WJKC	95.1 FM	Christiansted, Virgin Islands
WJKD	99.7 FM	Vero Beach, Florida
WJKE	101.3 FM	Stillwater, New York
WJKG	105.5 FM	Altamont, Illinois
WJKI-FM	103.5 FM	Bethany Beach, Delaware
WJKK	98.7 FM	Vicksburg, Mississippi
WJKL	105.7 FM	San Juan, Puerto Rico
WJKN-FM	89.3 FM	Spring Arbor, Michigan
WJKR	103.9 FM	Worthington, Ohio
WJKS	104.3 FM	Keeseville, New York
WJKV	90.9 FM	Jacksonville, Florida
WJKW	95.9 FM	Athens, Ohio
WJKX	102.5 FM	Ellisville, Mississippi
WJLB	97.9 FM	Detroit, Michigan
WJLE-FM	101.7 FM	Smithville, Tennessee
WJLF	91.7 FM	Gainesville, Florida
WJLH	90.3 FM	Flagler Beach, Florida
WJLI	98.3 FM	Metropolis, Illinois
WJLJ	103.1 FM	Etowah, Tennessee
WJLK-FM	94.3 FM	Asbury Park, New Jersey
WJLN	88.7 FM	White Springs, Florida
WJLR	91.5 FM	Seymour, Indiana
WJLS-FM	99.5 FM	Beckley, West Virginia
WJLT	105.3 FM	Evansville, Indiana
WJLU	89.7 FM	New Smyrna Beach, Florida
WJLV	94.7 FM	Jackson, Mississippi
WJLY	88.3 FM	Ramsey, Illinois
WJLZ	88.5 FM	Virginia Beach, Virginia
WJMA	103.1 FM	Culpeper, Virginia
WJMC-FM	96.1 FM	Rice Lake, Wisconsin
WJMD	104.7 FM	Hazard, Kentucky
WJMF	88.7 FM	Smithfield, Rhode Island
WJMG	92.1 FM	Hattiesburg, Mississippi
WJMH	102.1 FM	Reidsville, North Carolina
WJMI	99.7 FM	Jackson, Mississippi
WJMJ	88.9 FM	Hartford, Connecticut
WJML	106.3 FM	Thompsonville, Michigan
WJMM-FM	99.1 FM	Keene, Kentucky
WJMN	94.5 FM	Boston, Massachusetts
WJMQ	92.3 FM	Clintonville, Wisconsin
WJMR-FM	98.3 FM	Menomonee Falls, Wisconsin
WJMU	89.5 FM	Decatur, Illinois
WJMX-FM	103.3 FM	Cheraw, South Carolina
WJMZ-FM	107.3 FM	Anderson, South Carolina
WJNA	96.7 FM	Westminster, South Carolina
WJNF	91.7 FM	Dalton, Massachusetts
WJNG	100.5 FM	Johnsonburg, Pennsylvania
WJNH	91.1 FM	Conway, New Hampshire
WJNI	106.3 FM	Ladson, South Carolina
WJNR-FM	101.5 FM	Iron Mountain, Michigan
WJNS-FM	92.1 FM	Bentonia, Mississippi
WJNV	99.1 FM	Jonesville, Virginia
WJNX-FM	106.1 FM	Okeechobee, Florida
WJNY	90.9 FM	Watertown, New York
WJOB-FM	93.3 FM	Susquehanna, Pennsylvania
WJOD	103.3 FM	Asbury, Iowa
WJOE	103.9 FM	Vienna, West Virginia
WJOG	91.3 FM	Good Hart, Michigan
WJOH	91.5 FM	Raco, Michigan
WJOJ	89.7 FM	Rust Township, Michigan
WJOM	88.5 FM	Eagle, Michigan
WJOT-FM	105.9 FM	Wabash, Indiana
WJOU	90.1 FM	Huntsville, Alabama
WJOX-FM	94.5 FM	Birmingham, Alabama
WJPA-FM	95.3 FM	Washington, Pennsylvania
WJPD	92.3 FM	Ishpeming, Michigan
WJPG	88.1 FM	Cape May Court House, New Jersey
WJPH	89.9 FM	Woodbine, New Jersey
WJPR	91.7 FM	Jasper, Indiana
WJPS	107.1 FM	Boonville, Indiana
WJPT	106.3 FM	Fort Myers, Florida
WJPZ-FM	89.1 FM	Syracuse, New York
WJQK	99.3 FM	Zeeland, Michigan
WJQM	93.1 FM	De Forest, Wisconsin
WJQQ	97.1 FM	Somerset, Kentucky
WJQX	100.5 FM	Helena, Alabama
WJQZ	103.5 FM	Wellsville, New York
WJRB	95.1 FM	Young Harris, Georgia
WJRC	90.9 FM	Lewistown, Pennsylvania
WJRE	102.5 FM	Galva, Illinois
WJRF	89.5 FM	Duluth, Minnesota
WJRH	104.9 FM	Easton, Pennsylvania
WJRL-FM	100.5 FM	Slocomb, Alabama
WJRR	101.1 FM	Cocoa Beach, Florida
WJRS	104.9 FM	Jamestown, Kentucky
WJRZ-FM	100.1 FM	Manahawkin, New Jersey
WJSA-FM	96.3 FM	Jersey Shore, Pennsylvania
WJSC-FM	90.7 FM	Johnson, Vermont
WJSG	104.3 FM	Hamlet, North Carolina
WJSH	104.7 FM	Folsom, Louisiana
WJSM-FM	92.7 FM	Martinsburg, Pennsylvania
WJSN-FM	97.3 FM	Jackson, Kentucky
WJSO	90.1 FM	Pikeville, Kentucky
WJSP-FM	88.1 FM	Warm Springs, Georgia
WJSQ	101.7 FM	Athens, Tennessee
WJSR	100.9 FM	Lakeside, Virginia
WJST	102.1 FM	Sylvester, Georgia
WJSU-FM	88.5 FM	Jackson, Mississippi
WJSV	90.5 FM	Morristown, New Jersey
WJSZ	92.5 FM	Ashley, Michigan
WJTA	88.9 FM	Glandorf, Ohio
WJTB-FM	95.3 FM	South Congaree, South Carolina
WJTF	89.9 FM	Panama City, Florida
WJTG	91.3 FM	Fort Valley, Georgia
WJTK	96.5 FM	Columbia City, Florida
WJTL	90.3 FM	Lancaster, Pennsylvania
WJTQ	100.7 FM	Pensacola, Florida
WJTT	94.3 FM	Red Bank, Tennessee
WJTY	88.1 FM	Lancaster, Wisconsin
WJUC	107.3 FM	Swanton, Ohio
WJUF	90.1 FM	Inverness, Florida
WJUV	88.3 FM	Cullman, Alabama
WJUX	99.7 FM	South Fallsburg, New York
WJVC	96.1 FM	Center Moriches, New York
WJVK	91.7 FM	Owensboro, Kentucky
WJVL	99.9 FM	Janesville, Wisconsin
WJVM	90.3 FM	Bellefonte, Pennsylvania
WJVO	105.5 FM	South Jacksonville, Illinois
WJVP	89.3 FM	Culebra, Puerto Rico
WJVR	101.9 FM	Iron Gate, Virginia
WJWA	91.5 FM	Evansville, Indiana
WJWD	90.3 FM	Marshall, Wisconsin
WJWJ-FM	89.9 FM	Beaufort, South Carolina
WJWR	90.3 FM	Bloomington, Illinois
WJWT	91.7 FM	Gardner, Massachusetts
WJWV	90.9 FM	Fort Gaines, Georgia
WJWZ	97.9 FM	Wetumpka, Alabama
WJXA	92.9 FM	Nashville, Tennessee
WJXB-FM	97.5 FM	Knoxville, Tennessee
WJXL-FM	92.5 FM	Jacksonville Beach, Florida
WJXM	95.1 FM	Marion, Mississippi
WJXN-FM	100.9 FM	Utica, Mississippi
WJXQ	106.1 FM	Charlotte, Michigan
WJXR	92.1 FM	Macclenny, Florida
WJYD	106.3 FM	London, Ohio
WJYI	103.1 FM	Tifton, Georgia
WJYJ	88.1 FM	Hickory, North Carolina
WJYO	91.5 FM	Fort Myers, Florida
WJYW	88.9 FM	Union City, Indiana
WJYY	105.5 FM	Concord, New Hampshire
WJZ-FM	105.7 FM	Catonsville, Maryland
WJZB	88.7 FM	Starkville, Mississippi
WJZD-FM	94.5 FM	Long Beach, Mississippi
WJZE	97.3 FM	Oak Harbor, Ohio
WJZM	105.1 FM	Waverly, Tennessee
WJZQ	92.9 FM	Cadillac, Michigan
WJZS	106.1 FM	Live Oak, Florida
WJZZ	88.1 FM	Montgomery, New York

== See also ==
- North American call sign
