= List of independent radio stations =

This is the list of independent radio stations. Included are any non-profit terrestrial broadcast community radio stations not directly affiliated, owned, or otherwise controlled by any radio network, school, company, or government. All independent radio listed stations are independently operated (not necessarily the radio format indie music), and are considered to be community radio. A counterpart to this list is the list of college radio stations (some of the college radio stations are also community radio stations).

== Canada ==
- CKON FM 97.3 – Akwesasne, Ontario/Québec
- CKRL FM 89.1 – Québec City, Québec
- CKUA FM 94.9 - Edmonton, Alberta
- CJAI-FM Island Radio 101.3 FM – Stella, Ontario
- CFML Evolution 107.9 FM – Vancouver, British Columbia
- CITR CiTR 101.9 FM – Vancouver, British Columbia
- CFRO Co-op Radio 100.5 FM – Vancouver, British Columbia
- CJSF CJSF 90.1 FM – Burnaby, British Columbia
- CIVL CIVL 101.7 FM – Abbotsford, British Columbia
- CHLY CHLY 101.7 FM – Nanaimo, British Columbia
- CHLY CFUV 101.9 FM – Victoria, British Columbia
- CKXS The New 99.1 FM – Wallaceburg, Ontario
- CKWR FM 98.5 – Kitchener, Ontario
- CJPE 99.3 CountyFM - Picton, Ontario

== United States ==
- WORT 89.9 FM Listener Sponsored Community Radio Madison, Wisconsin
- KKBO 105.9 FM Big Rig Bismarck, North Dakota
- KKRV 107.5 FM MOJO Bismarck, North Dakota
- KXCI 91.3FM Tucson's Community Radio Tucson, Arizona
- KWSS 93.9FM The Alternative Phoenix, Arizona
- KUHS 97.9 FM Hot Springs, Arkansas
- KABF FM 88.3 Little Rock, Arkansas
- KDVS 90.3 FM Davis, California
- KPIG 107.5 FM Freedom, California
- KFJC FM 89.7 Los Altos Hills, California
- KTOX 1340 AM Needles, California
- KVMR FM 89.5 Nevada City, California
- KCSN 88.5 FM Northridge, California
- KHTS 1220 AM in Santa Clarita, California
- KCRW 89.9 FM Santa Monica, California
- KSVY 91.3 FM Sonoma, California
- KZSU FM 90.1 Stanford. California
- KGNU-FM FM 88.5 Denver/Boulder/Longmont, Colorado
- WPKN FM 89.5 Real People Real Radio Bridgeport, Connecticut
- WDUP-LP 92.9 FM Home of Timeless Hip Hop and R&B New London, Connecticut
- WSLR 96.5 FM Radio Sarasota, Florida
- WMNF FM 88.5 Tampa, Florida
- WRFG-FM FM 89.3 Atlanta, Georgia ("Radio Free Georgia")
- WDBX FM 91.9 Carbondale, Illinois
- WCKS 102.7 FM Carrollton, Georgia / Fruithurst, Alabama
- WEFT FM 90.1 Champaign, Illinois
- WLUW FM 88.7 Chicago, Illinois
- KJHK FM 90.7 The sound alternative Lawrence, Kansas
- WFPK FM 91.9 Louisville, Kentucky
- WNKR FM 106.7 Williamstown/Dry Ridge, Kentucky
- KLSU 91.1 FM Baton Rouge, Louisiana
- WWOZ FM 90.7 New Orleans, Louisiana
- WOCM FM 98.1 Ocean City, Maryland
- WTMD FM 89.7 Towson, Maryland
- WXRV FM 92.5 Andover, Massachusetts
- WERS 88.9 FM Boston, Massachusetts
- WRBB 104.9 FM Boston, Massachusetts
- WOMR FM 92.3 Outermost Radio Provincetown, Massachusetts
- WMEX 1510 AM Quincy, Massachusetts
- WSAR 1480 AM Somerset, Massachusetts
- WHTB 1400 AM Somerset, Massachusetts
- WMVY 88.7 FM Tisbury, Massachusetts
- WYCE FM 88.1 Grand Rapids, Michigan
- WXTF 97.9 FM Harrisville, Michigan
- KCMP FM 89.3 Minneapolis, Minnesota
- KDHX 88.1 FM St. Louis, Missouri
- KGLT FM 91.9 Bozeman, Montana
- WMWV 93.5 FM Conway, New Hampshire
- WFMU FM 91.1 Jersey City, New Jersey
- WPRB 103.3 FM Princeton, New Jersey
- WXPK FM 107.1, Briarcliff Manor, New York
- WBNY 91.3 FM Buffalo, New York
- WITR 89.7 FM Henrietta, New York
- WRFI-FM FM 88.1, Ithaca, New York
- WVBR-FM FM 93.5, Ithaca, New York
- WFUV 90.7 FM New York, New York
- WBER 90.5 FM Penfield, New York
- WKZE 98.1 FM WKZE Red Hook, New York
- WDKX 103.9 Rochester, New York
- WDST Radio Woodstock, FM 100.1 WDST Woodstock, New York
- WXYC 89.3 FM Chapel Hill, North Carolina
- WXDU 88.7 FM Durham, North Carolina
- WHUP-FM 104.7 FM Hillsborough, North Carolina
- WKNC 88.1 FM Raleigh, North Carolina
- WDJS 102.5 FM & 1430 AM Goldsboro/Mt. Olive, North Carolina
- WSGE-FM FM 91.7 Dallas/Gastonia/Charlotte, North Carolina
- WXRC FM 95.7 Hickory/Charlotte/Gastonia, North Carolina
- WKVR FM 102.5 Baltimore/Columbus, Ohio
- KKRP Cowlington, Oklahoma
- KBOO FM 90.7, Portland, Oregon
- KXRY FM 91.1, Portland, Oregon
- WDIY FM 88.1 Allentown, Pennsylvania
- WXPN 88.5 FM Philadelphia, Pennsylvania
- WKDU 91.7 FM Philadelphia, Pennsylvania
- WSRU 88.1 FM Slippery Rock, Pennsylvania
- WYEP FM 91.3 Pittsburgh, Pennsylvania
- WXRY FM 99.3 Columbia, South Carolina
- KEOS FM 89.1 Bryan/College Station, Texas
- KKXT 91.7 FM Dallas-Fort Worth, Texas
- KEDA 1540 AM San Antonio, Texas
- KBEC AM 1390, Waxahachie, Texas
- KRCL FM 90.9 Salt Lake City, Utah
- WERA-LP FM 96.7 Arlington, Virginia
- WRIR-LP FM 97.3, Richmond, Virginia
- WEQX FM 102.7 Manchester, Vermont
- KNKX FM 88.5 Tacoma, Washington
- KEXP FM 90.3 Seattle, Washington
- KSER FM 90.7 Everett, Washington
- KXIR FM 89.9 Freeland, Washington
- KYRS FM 89.9, 92.3 Spokane, Washington
- KHOL FM 89.1 Jackson, Wyoming
- KPOO FM 89.5 San Francisco, California
- WFHB FM 91.3 Bloomington, Indiana
- WRCO FM 100.9 Richland Center, Wisconsin
- WRCO AM 1450 Richland Center, Wisconsin
- chirpradio.org FM 107.1 Chicago, Illinois
- WFNX-LP FM 101.3 Scituate, Massachusetts

== New Zealand ==
- andHow.FM FM 107.5, Mangaroa
- The Cheese FM 87.9, Lower Hutt

== See also ==
- List of campus radio stations
- List of community radio stations in Canada
- List of community radio stations in the United States
