= WIRP =

WIRP may refer to:

- WIRP-LD, a low-power television station (channel 10, virtual 27) licensed to serve Raleigh, North Carolina, United States
- WGNK, a radio station (88.3 FM) licensed to serve Pennsuco, Florida, United States, which held the call sign WIRP from 1996 to 2008
