= WJOB =

WJOB may refer to:

- WJOB (AM), a radio station (1230 AM) licensed to serve Hammond, Indiana, United States
- WJOB-FM, a radio station (93.3 FM) licensed to serve Susquehanna, Pennsylvania, United States
