= WJKW =

WJKW may refer to:

- WJW (TV), a television station (channel 8 analog/31 digital) licensed to Cleveland, Ohio, United States, which used the call signs WJKW or WJKW-TV from April 1977 to September 1985
- WJKW (FM), a radio station (95.9 FM) licensed to Athens, Ohio, United States
