= Rotation (broadcast programming) =

Repeated broadcasting of a number of songs or music videos

In broadcasting, rotation is the repeated airing of a limited playlist of songs on a radio station or satellite radio channel, or music videos on a TV network. They are usually in a different order each time. However, they are not completely shuffled, so as to avoid varying the time between any two consecutive plays of a given song by either too much or too little. When measuring airplay, the number of times a song is played is counted as spins.

Stations playing new music typically have a short rotation of around four hours, while stations playing "classics" may go as long as eight hours, with a few stations promising "no repeats" where a song is not played again during a broadcast day to allow a much broader playlist (or if there is a purposeful repeat on that type of station, it ties into a station contest for a prize, such as tickets to the played artist's concert). College radio and indie radio stations sometimes have no particular rotation, only the music director's suggested lists for the disc jockeys, or are totally freeform radio. Broadcast automation systems handle a limited rotation quite well, in turn making voice tracking easy. Even if a live person is present, the automation system at commercial stations usually picks the music ahead of time out of the current rotation, thus the DJ becomes only an announcer.

Heavy rotation or power rotation is a list of songs that get the most airplay on a radio station, which allows a listener an easier opportunity to listen to a favorite song or new hit song and will be played nearly every other of the day. Repeating songs can cause exhaustion for the listener though, so diversity in a rotation is required to reduce tune-outs from repetition.

A song placed in "lunar rotation" is one that is only played in off-peak hours, usually late at night. This is usually because the song's content or its tone (for instance, Barry White's "Practice What You Preach", a common standard of quiet storm programs, would be jarring to listeners during the day), or to 'bury' a song not doing well in daytime hours.

== Recurrent rotation ==
Recurrent rotation refers to a group of songs still frequently aired on a contemporary hit radio station several months or even years after the initial debut. It is also used to describe core songs in other radio formats as well. Most charts have special rules to determine when a song has become recurrent, at which point they are removed from current charts (such as the Billboard Hot 100) and placed on special "recurrent charts". Recurrent charts tend to be more static, with fewer week-to-week changes in popularity than current charts.

The Billboard charts include these lists:

- Hot 100 Singles Recurrents
- Hot 100 Recurrent Airplay
- Hot R&B/Hip-Hop Recurrents
- Hot R&B/Hip-Hop Recurrent Airplay
- Top 40 Adult Recurrents
- Hot Adult Contemporary Recurrents
- Hot Country Recurrents

Songs that survive in recurrent rotation typically form the basis of radio formats as years advance. A hit song that is left out of recurrent rotation will eventually become known as a "forgotten 45", a name derived from the fact that singles used to be released on 45 RPM records.
