= WHMO =

WHMO may refer to:

- WHMO (FM), a radio station (91.1 FM) licensed to serve Madison, Indiana, United States
- The White House Military Office
