= WURB =

WURB may refer to:

- WURB-LP, a low-power radio station (92.7 FM) licensed to serve Kissimmee, Florida, United States; see List of radio stations in Florida
- WVVO, a radio station (1140 AM) licensed to serve Orlando, Florida, which held the call sign WURB from 2019 to 2021
- WGTI, a radio station (97.7 FM) licensed to serve Winfall, North Carolina, United States, which held the call sign WURB from 1990 to 2006
