= WJHS =

WJHS may refer to:

- WJHS (FM), a radio station (91.5 FM) licensed to Columbia City, Indiana, United States
- West Johnston High School in Benson, North Carolina
- Walter Johnson High School in North Bethesda, Maryland
- West Jordan High School in West Jordan, Utah
- West Jefferson High School (Louisiana) in Jefferson Parish, Louisiana
- West Jefferson High School (Ohio) in West Jefferson, Ohio
