= XHFS-FM =

Radio station in Izúcar de Matamoros, Puebla, Mexico

- Izúcar de Matamoros, Puebla; Mexico
- Frequency: 91.1 FM
- Branding: La Mexicana

Programming
- Format: Regional Mexican
- Affiliations: Radiorama

Ownership
- Owner: Balbuena Cabrera family; (BAC Comunicaciones, S.A. de C.V.)
- Operator: Radiorama

History
- First air date: May 10, 1978 (concession)
- Call sign meaning: Fidel Balbuena Sánchez

Technical information
- ERP: 6 kW
- Transmitter coordinates: 18°36′42″N 98°28′04″W

Links
- Website: radioramaizucar.com

XHFS-FM is a radio station on 91.1 FM in Izúcar de Matamoros, Puebla, Mexico. It is operated by Radiorama and known as La Mexicana with a regional Mexican format.

== History ==
XEFS-AM 1400 received its concession on May 10, 1978, broadcasting with 250 watts. It was owned by Fidel Balbuena Sánchez until 2010, when ownership was transferred to BAC. XEFS later moved to 840 and then 980 kHz. The move to 980 allowed a power increase from 500 to 5,000 watts.

XEFS was cleared to move to FM in 2010.
