= WVNH =

Radio station in Concord, New Hampshire

WVNH and WANH
WVNH: Concord, New Hampshire; WANH: Meredith, New Hampshire; United States
- Broadcast area: WVNH: Concord/Franklin, New Hampshire; WANH: Laconia, New Hampshire
- Frequencies: WVNH: 91.1 MHz; WANH: 88.3 MHz

Programming
- Format: Christian radio

Ownership
- Owner: New Hampshire Gospel Radio, Inc.

History
- First air date: WVNH: March 7, 1999; WANH: July 1, 2009
- Former frequencies: WANH: 91.5 MHz (2009–2018)

Technical information
- Licensing authority: FCC
- Facility ID: WVNH: 8698; WANH: 122150
- Class: WVNH: A; WANH: A
- ERP: WVNH: 650 watts; WANH: 380 watts
- HAAT: WVNH: 101 meters (331 ft); WANH: 123 meters (404 ft)
- Transmitter coordinates: WVNH: 43°23′54″N 71°25′24″W; WANH: 43°41′25″N 71°22′34″W

Links
- Public license information: WVNH: Public file; LMS; WANH: Public file; LMS
- Website: nhgr.org

WVNH (91.1 FM) is a radio station broadcasting a Christian radio format. Licensed to Concord, New Hampshire, United States, the station serves the Concord and Franklin areas. The station is currently by New Hampshire Gospel Radio, Inc. (NHGR). Programming is simulcast on WANH (88.3 FM) in Meredith, serving the Lakes Region and on WJNH (91.1 FM) in Conway, serving the Ossippee/Conway area.

The licensee for WANH, WJNH, and WVNH is New Hampshire Gospel Radio, Inc. The board of directors are; John Loker; George Dykstra, Treasurer; Peter J. Stohrer, Vice President; John Donovan, President; Janice Cyr, Secretary/Station Manager/Director; Judy Mason, Cheryl Eggert, Steve Blanchard, Mark Hendersen, Tom Marsh, Certified Public Accountant; and Roy McCandless, Attorney at Law.

The studios for NHGR are located at on Ferry Street in Concord.

== Translators ==
In addition to the main station, WVNH is relayed by several broadcast translators to widen its broadcast area.

Broadcast translators for WVNH
Call sign	Frequency	City of license	FID	ERP (W)	Class	FCC info
W245AF	96.9 FM	Ashland, New Hampshire	86079	10	D	LMS
W282AF	104.3 FM	Concord, New Hampshire	82567	10	D	LMS

Broadcast translator for WANH
Call sign	Frequency	City of license	FID	ERP (W)	Class	FCC info
W240CS	95.9 FM	Bristol, New Hampshire	145019	10	D	LMS

WVNH formerly operated a third translator, W241AJ (96.1 FM) in Laconia; this facility was sold to Lakes Media for $7,500 in 2024, to relay WASR.

== History ==
The station was assigned call sign WQFB on November 15, 1991. On November 1, 1992, the station changed its call sign to WVNH. It took to the air on March 7, 1999; on July 1, 2009, WANH, and in April 2022, WJNH, began broadcasting.
