= WOYE =

Radio station in Río Grande–San Juan, Puerto Rico

Rio Grande, Puerto Rico; Puerto Rico
- Broadcast area: Fajardo, Puerto Rico; San Juan, Puerto Rico
- Frequency: 97.3 MHz
- Branding: Magic 97.3/99.5

Programming
- Format: Adult Hits

Ownership
- Owner: Magic Radio Networks; (AA Broadcast, LLC)
- Sister stations: WIDI

History
- First air date: August 15, 2003 (22 years ago)
- Former call signs: WDGT (2002–2006)
- Call sign meaning: OYE = Spanish for hear

Technical information
- Licensing authority: FCC
- Facility ID: 68833
- Class: B
- ERP: 35,800 watts
- HAAT: 851.0 meters (2,792.0 ft)
- Transmitter coordinates: 18°16′37″N 65°51′11″W

Links
- Public license information: Public file; LMS
- Website: magic973.com

WOYE (97.3 FM) is a radio station. Licensed to Rio Grande, Puerto Rico, WOYE serves San Juan, Puerto Rico and the entire metropolitan area. The station carries a mix of the 1980s, 1990s, and modern English music. WOYE brands itself as Magic and it is owned by Magic Radio Networks.

== Logos ==
Logo used from 2010 to 2016, when the new logo was introduced in 2016.
