= XHMZI-FM =

Radio station in Melchor Múzquiz, Coahuila, serving Monclova

- Melchor Múzquiz, Coahuila; Mexico
- Broadcast area: Monclova, Región Carbonífera
- Frequency: 91.1 MHz
- Branding: Región 91.1 FM

Programming
- Format: Grupera and News/talk

Ownership
- Owner: Capital Media; (Radiodifusoras Capital, S.A. de C.V.)
- Operator: Grupo Región

History
- First air date: November 30, 1994 (concession)
- Call sign meaning: MúZquIz

Technical information
- Licensing authority: CRT
- Class: C
- ERP: 49.77 kW
- HAAT: 671.8 m (2,204 ft)

Links
- Website: capitalcoahuila.com.mx

XHMZI-FM is a radio station on 91.1 FM in Melchor Múzquiz, Coahuila, targeting the Monclova radio market. It is owned by CapitalMedia and operated by Grupo Región.

== History ==
XHMZI received its concession on November 30, 1994. While originally slated to operate on 106.7, it signed on 91.1 MHz. The station was owned by Rolando Ramiro González Treviño. In 2010, the sale of XHMZI to La Grande de Coahuila, S.A. de C.V.—also the name of the station itself—was authorized, and in 2015, La Grande sold to Capital Media.

On July 29, 2020, it was revealed that David Aguillón, a former PRI political figure, would lease Capital's four Coahuila radio stations; the formation of Grupo Región was formally announced on September 14.
