= WKJD =

Coordinates: 39°11′10″N 85°57′29″W

- Columbus, Indiana; United States
- Frequency: 90.3 MHz
- Branding: Bridge FM

Programming
- Format: Contemporary Christian music

Ownership
- Owner: Good Shepherd Radio, Inc.
- Sister stations: WYGS

Technical information
- Licensing authority: FCC
- Facility ID: 86545
- Class: A
- ERP: 3,400 watts
- HAAT: 82 meters (269 ft)

Links
- Public license information: Public file; LMS
- Webcast: Listen live
- Website: thebridgefm.org

WKJD is a radio station in broadcasting on 90.3 FM, licensed to Columbus, Indiana. The station airs a Contemporary Christian music format, and is owned by Good Shepherd Radio, Inc.
