= KJRF =

- Lawton, Oklahoma; United States
- Broadcast area: Lawton area
- Frequency: 91.1 MHz (HD Radio)

Programming
- Format: Christian radio

Ownership
- Owner: The Christian Center, Inc.

History
- First air date: January 2001
- Call sign meaning: King Jesus Reigns Forever

Technical information
- Licensing authority: FCC
- Facility ID: 82987
- Class: C1
- ERP: 100,000 watts
- HAAT: 126.0 meters (413.4 ft)
- Transmitter coordinates: 34°41′22″N 98°7′34″W

Links
- Public license information: Public file; LMS
- Webcast: Listen live
- Website: lawtonchristiancenter.org/our-radio-station

KJRF (91.1 FM) is a radio station broadcasting a Christian radio format. Licensed to Lawton, Oklahoma, United States, the station serves the Lawton area. The station is currently owned by The Christian Center, Inc.
