= WHVY =

- Coshocton, Ohio; United States
- Broadcast area: Coshocton, Ohio; Newcomerstown, Ohio
- Frequency: 89.5 MHz
- Branding: CleanAir.FM

Programming
- Format: Christian Radio

Ownership
- Owner: Clyde Educational Broadcasting Foundation
- Sister stations: WHVT

Technical information
- Licensing authority: FCC
- Facility ID: 171800
- Class: A
- ERP: 1,750 watts
- HAAT: 85 meters (279 ft)
- Transmitter coordinates: 40°18′17″N 81°44′04″W

Links
- Public license information: Public file; LMS
- Webcast: Listen live
- Website: cleanair.fm

WHVY is a Christian radio station licensed to Coshocton, Ohio, broadcasting on 89.5 FM. WHVY is owned by Clyde Educational Broadcasting Foundation.
