= WHVT =

- Clyde, Ohio; United States
- Broadcast area: Sandusky/Port Clinton; Lake Erie Islands
- Frequency: 90.5 MHz
- Branding: CleanAir.FM

Programming
- Language: English
- Format: Christian radio

Ownership
- Owner: Clyde Educational Broadcasting Foundation
- Sister stations: WHVY

History
- First air date: July 24, 1985

Technical information
- Licensing authority: FCC
- Facility ID: 12081
- Class: A
- ERP: 2,700 watts
- HAAT: 47.0 meters (154.2 ft)
- Transmitter coordinates: 41°17′45.00″N 82°58′26.00″W

Links
- Public license information: Public file; LMS
- Webcast: Listen live
- Website: cleanair.fm

WHVT (90.5 FM) is a radio station broadcasting a Christian radio format. Licensed to Clyde, Ohio, United States, the station is currently owned by the Clyde Educational Broadcasting Foundation.

WHVT is also heard in Findlay, Ohio through a translator on 94.1 FM.

| Call sign | Frequency | City of license | FID | ERP (W) | Class | FCC info |
|---|---|---|---|---|---|---|
| W231AJ | 94.1 FM | Findlay, Ohio | 76022 | 50 | D | LMS |
