= KROV (FM) =

- Oroville, California; United States
- Frequency: 91.1 MHz
- Branding: KROV 91.1

Programming
- Format: Variety

Ownership
- Owner: Bird Street Media Project

Technical information
- Licensing authority: FCC
- Facility ID: 173181
- Class: A
- ERP: 225 watts
- HAAT: 378 metres (1,240 ft)
- Transmitter coordinates: 39°30′18″N 121°18′35″W

Links
- Public license information: Public file; LMS
- Webcast: Listen live
- Website: krov.fm

KROV (91.1 FM) is a radio station licensed to serve the community of Oroville, California. The station is owned by Bird Street Media Project and airs a variety format. The station was assigned the KROV call letters by the Federal Communications Commission on March 29, 2012.
