= KVNG =

Coordinates: 32°43′07″N 111°24′00″W

- Eloy, Arizona; United States
- Broadcast area: Casa Grande, Arizona
- Frequency: 91.1 MHz
- Branding: Grace 91.1

Programming
- Format: Christian radio

Ownership
- Owner: Calvary Chapel of Casa Grande

Technical information
- Licensing authority: FCC
- Facility ID: 175820
- Class: C2
- ERP: 740 watts
- HAAT: 827.0 meters (2,713.3 ft)

Links
- Public license information: Public file; LMS
- Webcast: Listen live
- Website: www.grace911.com

KVNG (91.1 FM) is a Christian radio station licensed to Eloy, Arizona. The station airs a variety of Christian Talk and Teaching programming including; In Touch with Charles Stanley, Truth for Life with Alistair Begg, Revive Our Hearts with Nancy Leigh DeMoss, Answers in Genesis with Ken Ham, Thru the Bible with J. Vernon McGee, Joni and Friends, and Unshackled!, as well as Christian music. KVNG is owned by Calvary Chapel of Casa Grande.
