= KCCM-FM =

- Moorhead, Minnesota; United States
- Broadcast area: Fargo–Moorhead
- Frequency: 91.1 MHz (HD Radio)
- Branding: Your Classical MPR

Programming
- Format: Public radio, Classical music
- Affiliations: Minnesota Public Radio, NPR, American Public Media

Ownership
- Owner: Minnesota Public Radio
- Sister stations: KCCD

History
- First air date: October 30, 1971

Technical information
- Licensing authority: FCC
- Facility ID: 42926
- Class: C1
- ERP: 67,000 watts
- HAAT: 201 meters (659 ft)
- Transmitter coordinates: 46°45′35.5″N 96°36′27.0″W

Links
- Public license information: Public file; LMS
- Webcast: Listen live
- Website: Classical Minnesota Public Radio

KCCM-FM (91.1 FM) is a radio station licensed to Moorhead, Minnesota, serving the Fargo/Moorhead area. The station is owned by Minnesota Public Radio (MPR), and airs MPR's "Classical Music Network," originating from the Twin Cities. The station has inserts at least once an hour for local underwriting and weather. MPR also maintains an office and studio in Moorhead.

- See also Minnesota Public Radio
