= KGWB =

- Snyder, Texas; United States
- Frequency: 91.1 MHz
- Branding: 91.1 FM

Programming
- Format: College

Ownership
- Owner: Western Texas College; (Scurry County Junior College District)

History
- First air date: 2008
- Call sign meaning: K Great White Buffalo

Technical information
- Licensing authority: FCC
- Facility ID: 175017
- Class: A
- ERP: 240 watts
- HAAT: 11 meters (36 feet)
- Transmitter coordinates: 32°40′46″N 100°54′51″W

Links
- Public license information: Public file; LMS

KGWB (91.1 FM) is a radio station licensed to serve Snyder, Texas. The station is owned by Western Texas College and licensed to the Scurry County Junior College District. It airs a college radio format.

The station was assigned the KGWB-FM call letters by the Federal Communications Commission on June 26, 2008.

This station is currently on the air. Broadcast students will eventually run the station as their classes progress. The basketball games for Western Texas College are broadcast on KGWB.
