= WZTH =

Coordinates: 36°05′53″N 82°56′37″W

- Tusculum, Tennessee; United States
- Broadcast area: Greeneville, Tennessee; Morristown, Tennessee; Newport, Tennessee
- Frequency: 91.1 MHz
- Branding: Truth-FM

Programming
- Format: Christian radio

Ownership
- Owner: Solid Foundation Broadcasting

Technical information
- Licensing authority: FCC
- Facility ID: 172987
- Class: C3
- ERP: 17,000 watts
- HAAT: 87 meters (285 ft)

Links
- Public license information: Public file; LMS
- Website: truthfm.net

WZTH is a Christian radio station licensed to Tusculum, Tennessee, broadcasting on 91.1 FM. The station is owned by Solid Foundation Broadcasting.

WZTH's programming includes Christian talk and teaching shows such as Turning Point with David Jeremiah, Love Worth Finding with Adrian Rogers, In Touch with Charles Stanley, Truth for Life Alistair Begg, and Radio Bible Hour with J. Harold Smith. WZTH also airs a variety of Christian music.
