= WPSM =

- Fort Walton Beach, Florida; United States
- Broadcast area: Fort Walton Beach area
- Frequency: 91.1 MHz (HD Radio)

Programming
- Format: Contemporary worship music
- Affiliations: Salem Communications

Ownership
- Owner: Destiny Worship Center Inc.

History
- First air date: July 1, 1985

Technical information
- Licensing authority: FCC
- Facility ID: 22811
- Class: C3
- ERP: 11,000 watts
- HAAT: 104.7 meters
- Transmitter coordinates: 30°24′38.00″N 86°37′22.00″W

Links
- Public license information: Public file; LMS
- Webcast: Listen live
- Website: destinyradio.live

WPSM (91.1 FM) is a radio station broadcasting a Worship music format. Licensed to Fort Walton Beach, Florida, United States, the station serves Fort Walton Beach and most of northwest Florida. The station also streams online at destinyradio.live.

The station is owned by Destiny Worship Center Inc., and features programming from Salem Communications.

On October 9, 2020, WPSM changed its format from contemporary Christian to contemporary worship music, branded as "Destiny Radio".
