= DXEP =

Radio station in General Santos, Philippines

Pacman Radio (DXEP)
- General Santos; Philippines
- Broadcast area: South Cotabato, Sarangani and surrounding areas
- Frequency: 91.1 MHz
- Branding: 91.1 Pacman Radio

Programming
- Languages: Cebuano, Filipino
- Format: Contemporary MOR, OPM, Talk

Ownership
- Owner: JMP Mass Media Production; (Soccsksargen Broadcasting Network)

History
- First air date: 2011
- Former names: Kee's FM (2011-June 2018)
- Call sign meaning: Emmanuel Pacquiao

Technical information
- Licensing authority: NTC
- Class: CDE
- Power: 10,000 watts

DXEP (91.1 FM), broadcasting as 91.1 Pacman Radio, is a radio station owned and operated by JMP Mass Media Production. The station's studio is located along Yumang St., Brgy. San Isidro, General Santos.
