= WTSC-FM =

- Potsdam, New York; United States
- Frequency: 91.1 MHz
- Branding: The Source

Programming
- Format: Full Service, "Free-Format", College

Ownership
- Owner: Clarkson University; (Knight & Day Inc.)

History
- First air date: November 1963
- Call sign meaning: Thomas S. Clarkson

Technical information
- Licensing authority: FCC
- Facility ID: 11719
- Class: A
- ERP: 700 watts
- HAAT: 41 meters (135 feet)
- Transmitter coordinates: 44°39′45.00″N 75°0′7.00″W

Links
- Public license information: Public file; LMS
- Webcast: Listen Live
- Website: radio.clarkson.edu

WTSC-FM (91.1 FM, "The Source") is a non-commercial campus radio station licensed to serve the greater Potsdam, New York area. The station is owned by Clarkson University and licensed to Knight & Day Inc. The WTSC organization is affiliated with the Clarkson University Student Association (CUSA), from whom it receives the majority of its funding. WTSC is one of the few CUSA affiliated organizations which does not charge a membership fee.

== History ==
WTSC has been on the air since November 1963, at which point it broke away from two other local college stations (WNTC and WCCT). WTSC provided alternative programming such as live college division I hockey broadcasts. The great student following led to the station out-living both other stations and its existence today.

It airs a full-service college radio format.

In January 1992, Clarkson University reached an agreement to transfer the license for this station to Knight & Day Incorporated. The transfer was approved by the FCC on April 27, 1992, and the transaction was consummated on the same day.

previous logo
