= WIDI =

Quebradillas, Puerto Rico; Puerto Rico
- Broadcast area: Puerto Rico area
- Frequency: 99.5 MHz
- Branding: Magic 97.3/99.5

Programming
- Format: Adult Contemporary

Ownership
- Owner: Magic Radio Networks; (AA Broadcast, LLC)
- Sister stations: WOYE

History
- First air date: May 9, 1974 (51 years ago)
- Former call signs: WREI (1974–1993); WQQZ (1993–2000); WIDI (2000–2006); WOYE (2006)
- Former frequencies: 98.3 MHz (1974–2012)

Technical information
- Licensing authority: FCC
- Facility ID: 32141
- Class: B
- ERP: 22,400 watts
- HAAT: 855.0 meters (2,805.1 ft)
- Transmitter coordinates: 18°59′57.2″N 66°59′51.4″W

Links
- Public license information: Public file; LMS
- Website: magic973.com

WIDI (99.5 FM), branded on-air as Magic 97.3/99.5, is a radio station broadcasting an Adult Contemporary format. Licensed to Quebradillas, Puerto Rico, the station serves the Puerto Rico area. The station is currently owned by Magic Radio Networks.

== History ==
The station went on the air as WREI on 1974-05-09. It is remembered for its "Radio Rey" moniker. On 1993-06-01 the station changed its call sign to WQQZ, better known as "Sonorama", then known as "QQZ", later as a repeater of La Mega. On 2000-10-25 the station changed its ownership to FM Media Corporation and its callsign to the former WIDI, on 2006-02-07 to WOYE, on 2006-02-22 to the current WIDI.
