= KSGR =

Coordinates: 27.997°N 97.246°W

- Portland, Texas; United States
- Broadcast area: Corpus Christi metropolitan area
- Frequency: 91.1 MHz
- Branding: Solid Ground Radio 91.1

Programming
- Format: Christian radio

Ownership
- Owner: Calvary Chapel of the Coastlands, Inc.

History
- Call sign meaning: Solid Ground Radio

Technical information
- Licensing authority: FCC
- Facility ID: 81512
- ERP: 5,400 watts
- HAAT: 100 meters (330 ft)

Links
- Public license information: Public file; LMS
- Website: ksgr.org

KSGR (91.1 FM) is a non-commercial radio station licensed to Portland, Texas, United States, and serving the Corpus Christi metropolitan area. It is branded as "Solid Ground Radio" with a Christian radio format, and is owned by the Calvary Chapel of the Coastlands, Inc. "Solid Ground" is a reference to the Biblical parable of the "Two Builders." The studios and offices are on Rodd Field Road in Corpus Christi.

KSGR is a Class C3 station with an effective radiated power (ERP) of 5,400 watts.
