= WHDZ =

- Buxton, North Carolina; United States
- Frequency: 101.5 MHz
- Branding: Radio Hatteras

Programming
- Format: Variety

Ownership
- Owner: Radio Hatteras, Inc.
- Sister stations: WHDX

History
- First air date: 2008

Technical information
- Licensing authority: FCC
- Facility ID: 164162
- Class: A
- ERP: 130 watts
- HAAT: 20 meters (66 ft)
- Transmitter coordinates: 35°15′43.00″N 75°31′23.00″W

Links
- Public license information: Public file; LMS
- Webcast: listen live
- Website: Official website

WHDZ (101.5 FM) is a community radio station broadcasting a variety format. Licensed to Buxton, North Carolina, United States, the station is currently owned by Radio Hatteras, Inc.

== History ==
The Federal Communications Commission issued a construction permit for the station on April 1, 2005. The station was assigned the WHDZ call sign on April 13, 2005, and received its license to cover on May 5, 2008. The station was used for emergency news and weather information including Emergency Alert System alerts, rebroadcasting from NOAA Weather Radio station KIG99.

In late 2013, the licenses of WHDZ (and translator station WHDX, which also broadcasts from Buxton) were transferred to non-profit organization Radio Hatteras, Inc. WHDZ and WHDX changed formats in early 2014, and now broadcasts a variety format, relying on volunteer announcers and disc jockeys to produce Hatteras Island related programming.

On July 16, 2015, via their Facebook page, Radio Hatteras announced that they had received permission from the FCC to move WHDX's transmitter to Waves, North Carolina and increase power to 150 watts. With the move, Radio Hatteras' signals will cover the entirety of Hatteras Island.

== Radio Hatteras Stations ==
| Call sign | Frequency | City of license | FID | ERP (W) | Class | FCC info |
|---|---|---|---|---|---|---|
| WHDZ | 101.5 FM | Buxton, North Carolina | 164162 | 130 | A | LMS |
| WHDX | 99.9 FM | Waves, North Carolina | 164161 | 150 | A | LMS |

== See also ==
- List of community radio stations in the United States
