= Aire de Santa Fe =

Radio station in Santa Fe, Argentina

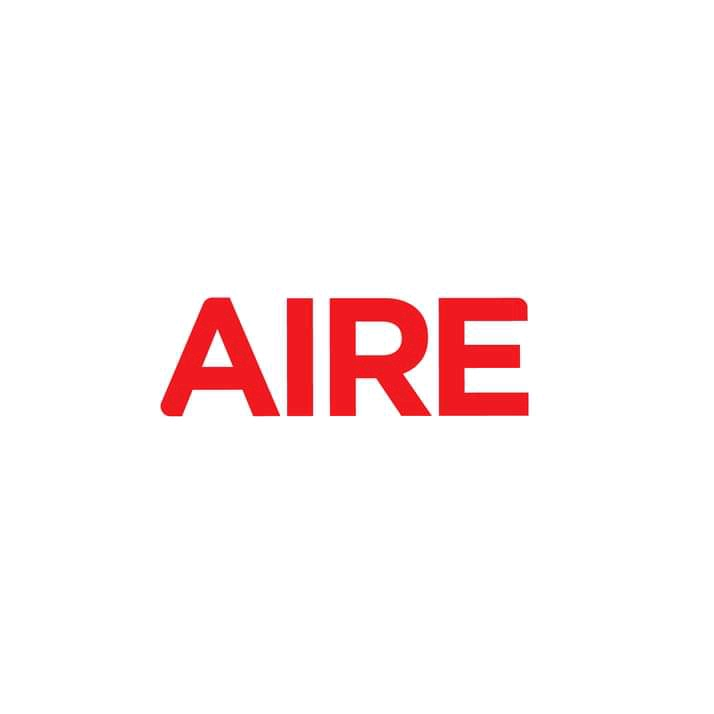
- Santa Fe; Argentina
- Broadcast area: Santa Fe Province
- Frequency: 91.1 MHz

Programming
- Format: Talk radio

Ownership
- Owner: Luis Mino

History
- First air date: December 1, 2008

Technical information
- Class: A
- ERP: 100 kW

Links
- Website: Aire Digital

Aire de Santa Fe is an Argentine radio station that transmits from the City of Santa Fe, Argentina on the FM 91.1 frequency and broadcasts on more than five stations through its network of radios located in the Santa Fe cities of Helvecia, Rafaela, San Javier, San Justo and Sunchales, as well as in the city of Paraná in Argentina It is owned by the businessman and journalist Luis Mino.

== History ==
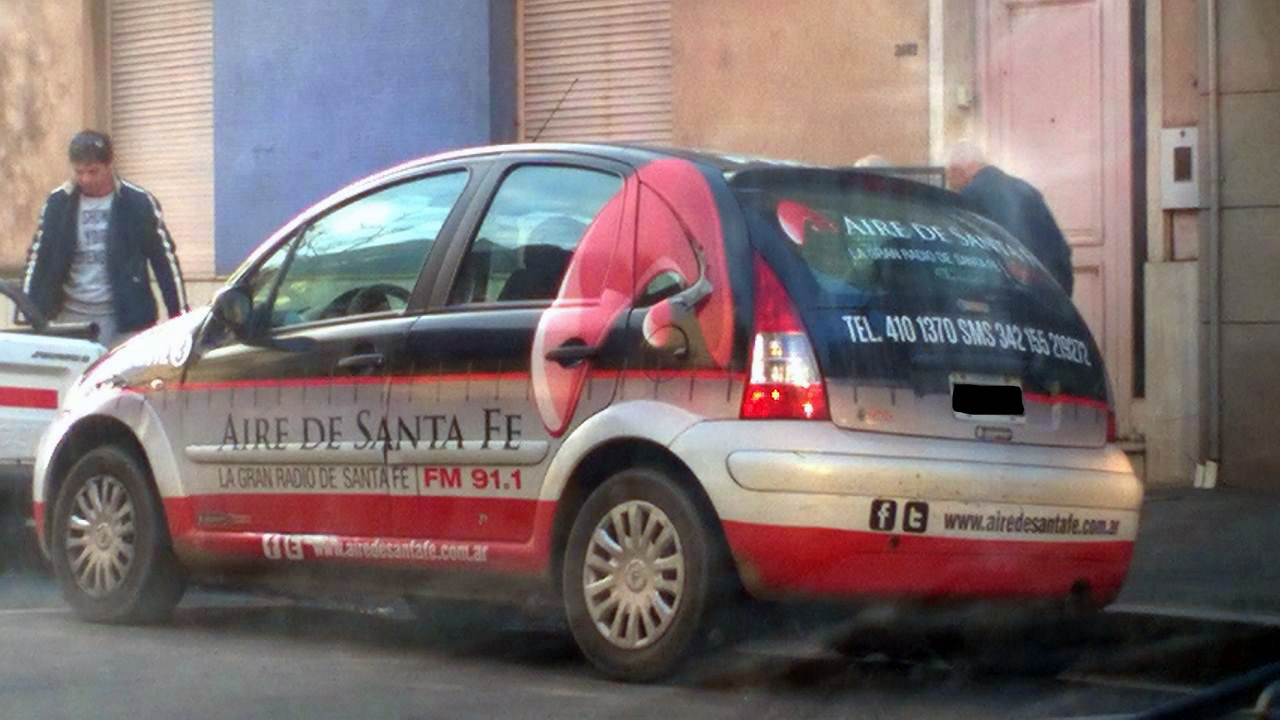
journalistic car of Aire de Santa fe

In 2008 and with the support of journalists such as Mercedes Marti, Marisa Brel, Gonzalo Bonadeo and its current director and renowned Argentine journalist Luis Mino, the radio began its broadcasts from the center of the city of Santa Fe, Argentina with studios overlooking the Street. In addition, a camera records images of the main study, to be transmitted through the radio website.

== Programming ==
Its grid is made up of journalistic programs, magazines and music programs. Currently, the Argentine journalist Luis Alberto Mino is the head of the radio.

It also has its own news service (Aire Digital) and national and international soccer broadcasts, they have even covered the 2018 World Cup in Russia.
