= WGNK =

- Pennsuco, Florida; United States
- Broadcast area: Miami area
- Frequency: 88.3 MHz
- Branding: Bless 88.3 FM

Programming
- Format: Spanish Contemporary Christian music

Ownership
- Owner: Grupo Génesis; (Genesis License Subsidiary LLC)

History
- First air date: 1992-10-09 (as WFHQ)
- Former call signs: WFHQ (1992–1996); WIRP (1996–2008); WGNK (2008); WIRP (2008)

Technical information
- Licensing authority: FCC
- Facility ID: 27304
- Class: A
- ERP: 6,000 watts
- HAAT: 86.0 meters
- Transmitter coordinates: 25°52′24.00″N 80°28′59.00″W

Links
- Public license information: Public file; LMS
- Website: https://bless883fm.com

WGNK (88.3 FM) is a non-commercial, listener supported radio station broadcasting a Spanish Contemporary Christian music format. Licensed to Pennsuco, Florida, United States, the station serves the Miami area. The station is currently owned by Grupo Génesis. It was also broadcast on WPAT-FM (HD2). The station was purchased by Great Commission Network. The station was renamed Bless 88.3 FM for Spanish music, religion, and pro-soccer talk as of June 29, 2026, under a programming deal with the JRP Family Foundation.
