= WGNG =

Radio station in Tchula–Greenville, Mississippi

Coordinates: 33.302°N 90.125°W

- Tchula, Mississippi; United States
- Broadcast area: Greenville-Greenwood, Mississippi
- Frequency: 106.3 MHz (HD Radio)
- Branding: The Heat

Programming
- Format: Urban contemporary

Ownership
- Owner: Team Broadcasting Company
- Sister stations: WGNL

History
- First air date: August 29, 1997
- Call sign meaning: W Greenville aNd Greenwood

Technical information
- Licensing authority: FCC
- Facility ID: 77692
- Class: C3
- ERP: 7,100 watts
- HAAT: 152 meters

Links
- Public license information: Public file; LMS
- Website: http://104wgnl.com

WGNG (106.3 FM) is a radio station licensed to Tchula, Mississippi, United States, with an urban contemporary format. The station is owned by Team Communications and serves the Greenville and Greenwood area. On June 1, 2008 the station flipped to Rhythmic contemporary, its first in north central Mississippi. On August 1, 2012 the station changed its format to urban contemporary.
