= WGTS =

Radio station in Takoma Park, Maryland

- Takoma Park, Maryland; United States
- Broadcast area: Washington metropolitan area; Eastern Shore/Delmarva
- Frequency: 91.9 MHz (HD Radio)
- RDS: WGTS91.9
- Branding: WGTS 91.9

Programming
- Format: Christian adult contemporary

Ownership
- Owner: Atlantic Gateway Communications Inc.

History
- First air date: May 8, 1957
- Former call signs: WGTS-FM (1957–1998)
- Call sign meaning: Gateway To Service

Technical information
- Licensing authority: FCC
- Facility ID: 12460
- Class: B
- ERP: 23,500 watts (analog); 940 watts (digital)
- HAAT: 186 metres (610 ft)
- Transmitter coordinates: 38°53′30.4″N 77°07′53.9″W)
- Repeater: 88.3 WGBZ (Ocean City)

Links
- Public license information: Public file; LMS
- Webcast: Listen live
- Website: www.wgts919.com

WGTS (91.9 MHz) is a non-commercial, FM radio station licensed to Takoma Park, Maryland. The station is licensed to and owned by Atlantic Gateway Communications Inc. It broadcasts a Christian adult contemporary music format. Its studios are in Rockville, Maryland, and its broadcast tower is located near Arlington, Virginia, and it operates a repeater service, WGBZ (88.3 MHz), near Ocean City, Maryland. The station call letters echo Washington Adventist University's motto: Washington's "Gateway To Service".

== History ==
WGTS began as a 10-watt campus broadcaster in 1957, operating from the basement of the men's dormitory at the then Washington Missionary College in Takoma Park. In 1960, the station increased its power to 10,000 watts with a second power increase in the mid-1960s bringing the station up to 29,500 watts. In 2004, the station completed a long-planned move of its broadcast transmitter from Takoma Park to Arlington, Virginia, lowering the station's transmission power but improving its signal's reach. In 2019, the station opened a new "broadcast ministry center" in Rockville, Maryland, for its studios. The new 13,000 square feet (1,200 m^{2}) center hosts two identical on-air studios, three production rooms, and a television studio and replaces the station's 3,000 square feet (280 m^{2}) World War II-era facility on the Washington Adventist University campus.

== Proposed sale and spin-off ==
In July 2007, Washington Adventist University considered selling WGTS to American Public Media (the parent company of Minnesota Public Radio). Several websites were set up to lobby for the Christian format of WGTS, which would be dropped should the station be sold. American Public Media offered $20–25 million to purchase WGTS. A $10 million initial offer by the WGTS board of directors to keep the station within Washington Adventist University was rejected. On September 20, 2007, the college board voted to halt any current discussions of selling WGTS.

In 2018, the Washington Adventist University board voted to spin off WGTS to a new nonprofit, Atlantic Gateway Communications, for a purchase price of $12 million. The divestiture was submitted to the FCC on July 3, and the transaction consummated on September 11, 2018. No changes to management came with the sale, and AGC signed a five-year lease for the station's current facilities. WAU Board of Trustees members sit on the board of Atlantic Gateway Communications, although it is not under the direct control of the university.

In March 2021, AGC and WGTS announced a deal with American University-owned WAMU to acquire the NPR station's Ocean City, Maryland-based repeater, WRAU (88.3 MHz) for $650,000. WGTS raised some $700,000 from listeners and supporters to fund the sale, giving the station a 50,000-watt repeater service for contemporary Christian programming on the Delmarva Peninsula. The station handover happened on June 24, 2021, and its call sign was changed to WGBZ.
