= WTSE =

Radio station in Benton, Tennessee

- Benton, Tennessee; United States
- Frequency: 91.1 MHz
- Branding: Radio by Grace

Programming
- Format: Christian Contemporary

Ownership
- Owner: Radio by Grace, Inc.

History
- First air date: 2005
- Call sign meaning: "Tennessee"

Technical information
- Licensing authority: FCC
- Facility ID: 93012
- Class: C3
- ERP: 8,500 watts
- HAAT: 142 meters (466 ft)
- Transmitter coordinates: 35°19′25″N 84°17′54″W
- Translator: 105.9 W290CA (Cleveland)

Links
- Public license information: Public file; LMS
- Webcast: Listen live
- Website: radiobygrace.com

WTSE (91.1 FM) is a radio station broadcasting a Contemporary Inspirational format. Licensed to Benton, Tennessee, United States, the station is currently owned by Radio by Grace, Inc.

These call letters were used on the TV show Becker (TV series), while listening to a radio, in the episode "P.C World" broadcast on January 25, 1999.
