= DXSW =

Philippine radio station

Radyo Natin Bislig (DXSW)
Bislig; Philippines
- Broadcast area: Southern Surigao del Sur
- Frequency: 91.1 MHz
- Branding: Radyo Natin 91.1

Programming
- Languages: Cebuano, Filipino
- Format: Community radio
- Network: Radyo Natin Network

Ownership
- Owner: MBC Media Group

History
- First air date: January 18, 2001

Technical information
- Licensing authority: NTC
- Power: 1,000 Watts

DXSW (91.1 FM), broadcasting as Radyo Natin 91.1, is a radio station owned and operated by MBC Media Group. Its studios and transmitters are located along P. Castillo St., Brgy. Mangagoy, Bislig.
