= KWTS =

Coordinates: 34.989°N 101.913°W

Canyon, Texas; United States
- Broadcast area: Amarillo, Texas
- Frequency: 91.1 MHz
- Branding: The One

Programming
- Format: 1990's hits

Ownership
- Owner: West Texas A&M University

History
- First air date: September 11, 1972
- Call sign meaning: West Texas State

Technical information
- Facility ID: 71654
- Class: A
- ERP: 6,000 watts
- HAAT: 43 m (141 ft)

Links
- Website: Official Website

KWTS, 91.1 FM, is a college radio station in Canyon, Texas, United States, and is owned and operated by the West Texas A&M University. Its studios are located on campus at the Sybil B. Harrington Fine Arts Complex, and its transmitter is located near Buffalo Sports Park, also on campus.

KWTS started broadcasting in 1972 with 10 watts—just enough to cover the university's campus. In 1982, the Federal Communications Commission ordered all educational radio stations to increase power. Later that year, the station's power increased to 100 watts and broadcast in stereo. The station now broadcasts across nine counties in the Texas Panhandle, as well as being available over the Internet.

The station has continuously aired special shows, both music and talk shows, ranging from classical to contemporary music of varying genres. Talk shows have varied in topic from gaming and sports to relationships. The station moved to the new Sybil B. Harrington fine arts complex in August 2006, but did not go live on the air until September 11, the birthday of the station.

On September 30, 2010, WTAMU opened up the AT&T High Definition Studio, which will be used by broadcasting students. On November 8, KWTS broke in the new studio with its "ONE Sessions at the Live Lounge" program, a live show which featured local music.

On April 11, 2022, to celebrate its 50th anniversary, KWTS announced it will change its format to all 1990s music on October 1.
