= WRMU-FM =

Radio station in Alliance, Ohio

Coordinates: 40.904°N 81.112°W

- United States
- Broadcast area: Alliance, Ohio
- Frequency: 91.1 MHz

Programming
- Format: College radio

Ownership
- Owner: University of Mount Union

History
- First air date: January 10, 1966
- Call sign meaning: Radio Mount Union

Technical information
- Class: A
- ERP: 2,800 watts
- HAAT: 58 meters

Links
- Webcast: http://www.mountunion.edu/WRMU
- Website: http://www.mountunion.edu/WRMU

WRMU-FM is a non-commercial FM radio station at the University of Mount Union (formerly Mount Union College) in Alliance, Ohio broadcasting at 91.1 MHz.

== History ==
The origins of Mount Union College's radio station can be traced to four Mount Union students who hatched the idea one afternoon in the Spring of 1965. The four were Andy Bass, Jim Lang, Daun Yeagley, and Dee Grapentine. A concept of operations was developed, presentations were given to the school President, Dr. Carl C. Bracy (who whole-heartedly gave his blessings) and to the Student Senate who allocated $2,000 as seed money for a station.

Dr. James Rodman and Dr. Joseph Falk were appointed as faculty advisors. The FCC was contacted to see if there were any low power AM broadcast frequencies available for the school to use. The answer was no. Because of a limited budget FM broadcasting was not explored. Another possibility, not requiring FCC approval, was to superimpose a low power AM radio signal on the AC power lines running in the dormitories. By using any AM radio plugged into a dorm power outlet students could receive the signal. WKSU at Kent State University was known to have used this type of system at one time on their campus. Personnel at WKSU were contacted and most helpful including providing schematics and drawings for the design of the carrier current transmitters they had used. Parts for the transmitters were purchased and Dee Grapentine (a licensed amateur radio operator) built the first operational unit. School electrician Jim Hayes wired it into the King Hall dormitory power system and it worked like a charm. Subsequently, more transmitters were built by Bob Comer and Ken Simpson, both amateur radio operators. Many other students and faculty pitched in to make WRMU a reality. The school had a broadcast studio built to professional standards and bore the cost of installing telephone lines to each of the dormitories so the broadcast signal could be fed there.

Station management was established with Jim Lang named as Program Manager, Daun Yeagley as Chief Engineer, with Andy Bass as Assistant Engineer, and Dee Grapentine as Station Manager. The first official broadcast of WRMU was done on the evening of 10 January 1966. Dr. Bracy gave the opening remarks.

The students who organized the station wanted to use the call letters WMUC—for Mt. Union College, but the call letters were already taken. So WRMU—Radio Mt. Union, was chosen as it was available. The original station contained one studio in the basement of Miller Hall. The construction of that studio started in the Fall of 1965. WRMU continued as a campus-only station until October 17, 1970 when the Federal Communications Commission (FCC) granted the college a license for WRMU to become a full-fledged FM station with the frequency 91.1. During the 1970s the station featured a mix of jazz, blues, classical and rock music. The station also began to broadcast Mount Union football and basketball games.

From the basement of Miller Hall, the radio station moved to new quarters on the second floor of Memorial Hall in 1983. The station grew from two studios to a total of four. A year later in 1984, the station began broadcasting in stereo. In May 1996, the station moved into its new and current home in the Hoover-Price Campus Center, where visitors can watch air talent through windows in the on-air studio. WRMU was known for its weekday Smooth Jazz format during the 1990s and 2000s, where it branded itself as the "Jazz Giant" of Northeast Ohio. The Smooth Jazz format was eventually dropped in 2015 due to declining student interest in the station. WRMU currently features music from the 80s, 90s, 2000s, and today during the week and "oldies" from the 50s, 60s, and 70s during the weekend.

== R91 ==
In January 2010, student-run radio shows broadcasting from 10pm to 2am on weekdays switched to the collective moniker of "R91", short for "Raider 91." The student shows feature a wide variety of music from rock to hip-hop, pop and alternative. R91 is meant to appeal to the Mount Union student body, in contrast to the daytime variety hits format that reaches out to the local Alliance/Canton, Ohio area. The R91 block was eventually shifted to 6pm to midnight in the mid-2010s.
