= WJPG =

- Cape May Court House, New Jersey; United States
- Frequency: 88.1 MHz

Programming
- Format: Contemporary Christian
- Affiliations: Salem Communications

Ownership
- Owner: Maranatha Ministries

Technical information
- Licensing authority: FCC
- Facility ID: 86859
- Class: A
- ERP: 1,500 watts
- HAAT: 129 meters (423 ft)
- Transmitter coordinates: 39°7′47.00″N 74°49′18.00″W

Links
- Public license information: Public file; LMS
- Webcast: Listen Live
- Website: southjerseyspraisefm.org

WJPG (88.1 FM) is a radio station broadcasting a Contemporary Christian format. Licensed to the Cape May Court House, section of Middle Township, Cape May County, New Jersey, United States. The station is currently owned by Maranatha Ministries and features programming from Salem Communications. The station is simulcast on 88.9 WJPH in Woodbine.

== History ==
The station went on the air as WJPG on May 22, 1997. On March 12, 2004, the station changed its call sign to the current WJPG.
