= CKSX-FM =

Radio station in Sioux Narrows, Ontario

- Sioux Narrows, Ontario; Canada
- Frequency: 91.1 MHz

Ownership
- Owner: The Corporation of the Township of Sioux Narrows—Nestor Falls

History
- First air date: October 9, 2009

Technical information
- Licensing authority: CRTC
- ERP: 50 watts
- HAAT: 30.4 metres (100 ft)
- Transmitter coordinates: 49.410°N 94.096°W

CKSX-FM is a community radio station which broadcasts on the frequency of 91.1 FM in Sioux Narrows, Ontario, Canada.

The station is owned by The Corporation of the Township of Sioux Narrows-Nestor Falls. It airs Radio Paradise throughout the day with hourly announcements of current time & weather conditions. though the township government utilizes the station for emergency announcements when needed.
