= KGWP =

Radio station in Pittsburg, Texas

- Pittsburg, Texas; United States
- Broadcast area: Mount Pleasant, TX
- Frequency: 91.1 MHz

Programming
- Language: Spanish
- Format: Christian

Ownership
- Owner: Andres Serranos Ministries, Inc.

History
- First air date: October 30, 2002; 23 years ago (as KKXI)
- Former call signs: KKXI (2002–2005)

Technical information
- Licensing authority: FCC
- Facility ID: 106449
- Class: A
- ERP: 1,100 watts
- HAAT: 59.0 meters
- Transmitter coordinates: 32°57′49.50″N 94°55′10.00″W

Links
- Public license information: Public file; LMS

KGWP (91.1 FM) is a radio station licensed to Pittsburg, Texas, United States and serving the Mount Pleasant, Texas area. The station is owned by Andres Serranos Ministries, Inc.

== History ==
The station went on the air as KKXI in 2003. On December 16, 2005, the station changed its call sign to the current KGWP.
