= WSPN =

Saratoga Springs, New York; United States
- Broadcast area: Saratoga Springs, New York
- Frequency: 91.1 MHz
- Branding: Listening Alternative

Programming
- Format: Freeform

Ownership
- Owner: Skidmore College

History
- First air date: September 9, 1974

Technical information
- Licensing authority: FCC
- Facility ID: 60538
- Class: A
- ERP: 250 watts
- HAAT: 30 meters (98 ft)
- Transmitter coordinates: 43°5′55.2″N 73°47′8.4″W

Links
- Public license information: Public file; LMS
- Webcast: Listen live (via TuneIn)
- Website: Official website

WSPN (91.1 FM) is a non-commercial college radio station located at 91.1 MHz and broadcasts from Saratoga Springs, New York, United States. The station is owned by Skidmore College.

== History ==
The station signed on September 9, 1974; its first license was issued on June 6, 1975.
