= WGNL =

Coordinates: 33°40′45″N 90°04′07″W

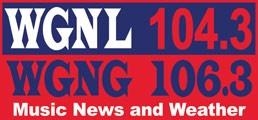
- Greenwood, Mississippi; United States
- Broadcast area: Greenwood, Mississippi; Grenada, Mississippi
- Frequency: 104.3 MHz
- Branding: WGNL 104.3 FM

Programming
- Format: Urban oldies

Ownership
- Owner: Team Broadcasting Company, Inc.
- Sister stations: WGNG

Technical information
- Licensing authority: FCC
- Facility ID: 64673
- Class: C2
- ERP: 50,000 watts
- HAAT: 91 meters (299 ft)

Links
- Public license information: Public file; LMS
- Website: 104wgnl.com

WGNL (104.3 FM) is a radio station licensed to Greenwood, Mississippi. The station broadcasts a blues and Urban Oldies format and is owned by Team Broadcasting Company, Inc.
