= WNSB =

- Norfolk, Virginia; United States
- Broadcast area: Hampton Roads
- Frequency: 91.1 MHz (HD Radio)
- Branding: Hot 91

Programming
- Format: Urban Alternative

Ownership
- Owner: Norfolk State University Board of Visitors

History
- First air date: April 1980
- Call sign meaning: Norfolk State Broadcasting

Technical information
- Licensing authority: FCC
- Facility ID: 49021
- Class: B1
- ERP: 8,100 watts
- HAAT: 132 meters (433 ft)
- Transmitter coordinates: 36°46′32.0″N 76°23′11.0″W

Links
- Public license information: Public file; LMS
- Webcast: Listen live
- Website: nsu.edu/WNSB

WNSB is an Urban Alternative formatted college radio station licensed to Norfolk, Virginia, serving Hampton Roads. WNSB is owned and operated by Norfolk State University.

WNSB is also licensed by the FCC to broadcast in HD Radio (hybrid) format.

Under the guidance of Mike Henry's Paragon Media Strategies, WNSB segued from Mainstream Urban to Urban Alternative on July 10, 2019.
