= XHAWL-FM =

Jacala de Ledezma; Mexico
- Broadcast area: Jacala de Ledezma, Hidalgo, Mexico
- Frequency: 91.1 MHz
- Branding: El Corazón de la Sierra

Programming
- Format: Public

Ownership
- Owner: Radio y Televisión de Hidalgo

History
- Former frequencies: 1300 AM

Technical information
- ERP: 6,000 watts
- Transmitter coordinates: 21°00′19″N 99°11′19″W

Links
- Website: radioytelevision.hidalgo.gob.mx/radio-2/

XHAWL-FM is a radio station in Jacala de Ledezma and is part of the Radio y Televisión de Hidalgo state network. It broadcasts on 91.1 MHz.

The station signed on in the early 1980s as XEAWL-AM 1300.
