= WRSH =

- Rockingham, North Carolina; United States
- Frequency: 91.1 MHz

Programming
- Format: Educational

Ownership
- Owner: Richmond County Board of Education

Technical information
- Licensing authority: FCC
- Facility ID: 56322
- Class: A
- HAAT: 49.0 meters
- Transmitter coordinates: 34°56′59.00″N 79°42′52.00″W

Links
- Public license information: Public file; LMS

WRSH (91.1 FM) is a radio station broadcasting an Educational format. Licensed to Rockingham, North Carolina, United States. The station is currently owned by Richmond County Board of Education.
