= DWPS-FM =

Spirit FM Gubat (DWPS)
- Gubat; Philippines
- Broadcast area: Sorsogon and surrounding areas
- Frequency: 91.1 MHz
- Branding: 91.1 Spirit FM

Programming
- Languages: Bicolano, Filipino
- Format: Religious Radio

Ownership
- Owner: Our Lady's Foundation

History
- First air date: 1994
- Former names: DWPS (1994-2022)

Technical information
- Licensing authority: NTC
- Power: 1 kW

91.1 Spirit FM (DWPS 91.1 MHz) is an FM station owned and operated by Our Lady's Foundation. Its studios and transmitter are located in Brgy. Pinontingan, Gubat.

== History ==
DWPS was founded in 1994 by Romeo Escasinas and Sarah Florano. Originally broadcasting from Zulueta Street, it served as a community radio station for Gubat. On December 30, 2022, the station signed off. Its equipment was donated to the local St. Anthony of Padua Parish Church. In March 2024, it returned on air as Spirit FM under the management of the said church.
