= KMTC =

Coordinates: 35.3031°N 93.1452°W

- Russellville, Arkansas; United States
- Frequency: 91.1 MHz
- Branding: "KMTC 91.1 FM"

Programming
- Format: Contemporary Christian

Ownership
- Owner: Russellville Educ B/C Foundation

History
- First air date: 1987
- Call sign meaning: More Than A Conqueror

Technical information
- Licensing authority: FCC
- Facility ID: 58266
- Class: A
- ERP: 360 watts
- HAAT: -19 meters
- Transmitter coordinates: 35°18'11" N, 93°08'42" W

Links
- Public license information: Public file; LMS
- Website: Official website

KMTC (91.9 FM) is a radio station licensed to Russellville, Arkansas, United States, and serving the Arkansas River Valley. The station is owned by Russellville Educational Broadcast Foundation.

== Specialty shows ==
KMTC produces two teaching programs in-house. "Jesus Is Alive" with Tom Underhill which airs daily and "Go Light Your World" with Bonnie Underhill and Susan Allen which airs Monday through Friday.
