= KOFG =

- Cody, Wyoming; United States
- Frequency: 91.1 MHz

Programming
- Format: Religious

Ownership
- Owner: James and Marilene Atnip; (Gospel Messengers)

History
- First air date: 2008
- Call sign meaning: "Old Fashion Gospel"

Technical information
- Licensing authority: FCC
- Facility ID: 121854
- Class: C1
- ERP: 8,700 watts
- HAAT: 547.0 meters (1,794.6 ft)
- Transmitter coordinates: 44°29′46″N 109°9′9″W

Links
- Public license information: Public file; LMS
- Webcast: Listen live
- Website: kofg.org

KOFG (91.1 FM) is a radio station broadcasting a religious format. Licensed to Cody, Wyoming, United States, the station is currently owned by James and Marilene Atnip, through licensee Gospel Messengers.
