= WPCJ =

Coordinates: 41.884°N 84.471°W

- Pittsford, Michigan; United States
- Broadcast area
- Frequency: 91.1 MHz
- Branding: WPCJ 91.1 FM

Programming
- Format: Religious
- Affiliations: Moody Radio Network; SRN News

Ownership
- Owner: Freedom Farm Bible Church; (Pittsford Educational Broadcasting Foundation)

History
- Former call signs: WURC (12/3/84-1/16/85)
- Call sign meaning: We Proclaim Christ Jesus

Technical information
- Licensing authority: FCC
- Class: A
- Power: 270 watts

Links
- Public license information: Public file; LMS
- Webcast: http://wma1.viastreaming.net/WPCJ
- Website: http://www.freedomfarm.info

WPCJ (91.1 FM) is a radio station licensed to Pittsford, Michigan broadcasting a religious format.
