= KHYG-FM =

Radio station in Hydaburg, Alaska

- Hydaburg, Alaska; United States
- Broadcast area: Metro Hydaburg
- Frequency: 91.1 MHz
- Branding: 91.1 KHYG

Programming
- Format: Variety

Ownership
- Owner: Hydaburg City School District

History
- First air date: July 24, 2016
- Call sign meaning: Hydaburg

Technical information
- Licensing authority: FCC
- Facility ID: 199223
- Class: D
- ERP: 30 watts
- HAAT: −93 meters (−305 ft)
- Transmitter coordinates: 55°12′27.0″N 132°49′27.0″W

Links
- Public license information: Public file; LMS

KHYG-FM is a Variety formatted broadcast radio station licensed to and serving Hydaburg, Alaska. KHYG-FM is owned and operated by Hydaburg City School District.
