= KROH =

Coordinates: 48°00′58″N 122°55′29″W

- Port Townsend, Washington; United States
- Frequency: 91.1 MHz

Programming
- Format: Religious

Ownership
- Owner: Olympic Media, Inc.

History
- First air date: August 12, 2011
- Call sign meaning: Radio of Hope

Technical information
- Licensing authority: FCC
- Facility ID: 173495
- Class: C2
- ERP: 1150 watts
- HAAT: 456 meters

Links
- Public license information: Public file; LMS
- Website: www.radioofhope.org

KROH (91.1 FM) is a non-commercial radio station broadcasting Traditional Christian music and spoken/teaching programming. Licensed to Port Townsend, Washington, United States, the station is currently owned by Olympic Media, Inc. Studios are located in leased space on the upper level of the Better Living Center, 1505 Franklin Street, which also houses a Community Clothing Bank, seasonal soup kitchen and educational center. The transmitter is located at the Maynard Peak Comm Site, which is part of an "antenna farm" atop Blyn Mountain at 2100'. Transmitter and studio facilities are equipped with emergency-generators to ensure operations when commercial power fails. KROH's signal reaches as far west as portions of Port Angeles, northeast to Bellingham and Concrete, north into portions of Vancouver, B.C., south to Poulsbo/Silverdale and southeast to portions of the Seattle metro depending upon terrain and adjacent-channel influences (varies). World-wide coverage is accomplished via streaming audio accessible at www.radioofhope.org/listen. 202 countries thus far.
