= Pennsuco, Florida =

Pennsuco
- Unincorporated community
- Pennsylvania Sugar Company factory

- Location within the state of Florida
- Coordinates: 25°53′42″N 80°22′41″W
- Country: United States
- State: Florida
- County: Miami-Dade
- Time zone: UTC-5 (Eastern (EST))
  - Summer (DST): UTC-4 (EDT)
- GNIS feature ID: 305081

Pennsuco is a former rural community in Miami-Dade County, Florida, along the Miami Canal and U.S. Route 27. It was established in 1920 by the Pennsylvania Sugar Company, which built a sugar cane plantation and sugar mill, and a self-contained community housing employees and their families. The sugar operation failed by 1925, largely due to a series of floods and killing frosts which ruined crops; the land was then adapted for regular truck farming until 1931, when the company ended operations at the site. A post office operated there until 1933, and the area continued as a farming community.

Today the area has become suburban, with the northern portion annexed by Hialeah Gardens and the southern portion industrialized and unpopulated. Virtually all of Pennsuco's old structures are no longer standing, but the name survives with Pennsuco Industrial Park and the Pennsuco Canal.

== See also ==
- Ernest R. Graham
