= WJOB-FM =

- Susquehanna, Pennsylvania; United States
- Broadcast area: Binghamton area
- Frequency: 93.3 MHz

Programming
- Format: Urban contemporary

Ownership
- Owner: The Broome County Urban League

History
- First air date: 2012

Technical information
- Licensing authority: FCC
- Facility ID: 185048
- Class: A
- ERP: 1,900 watts
- HAAT: 170 meters (560 ft)
- Transmitter coordinates: 41°0′51.00″N 75°40′57.00″W
- Repeater: WJOB-1-FM 93.3 (Binghamton)

Links
- Public license information: Public file; LMS
- Website: WJOB-FM online

WJOB-FM (93.3 MHz) is a non-commercial FM radio station broadcasting an urban contemporary format. Licensed to Susquehanna, Pennsylvania, the station serves the Binghamton, New York area. It is owned by The Broome County Urban League. 93.3 WJOB plays a mix of rhythm and blues, hip hop music, rap and dance music. On Sunday mornings the station broadcasts urban gospel music. The studios are on State Street in Binghamton.

WJOB-FM has an effective radiated power of 1,900 watts. It is also heard on a 260-watt booster station, WJOB-1-FM at 93.3 MHz in Binghamton.

Former logo
