= WHFC =

Radio station at Harford Community College in Bel Air, Maryland

- Bel Air, Maryland; United States
- Broadcast area: Aberdeen, Maryland
- Frequency: 91.1 MHz

Programming
- Format: Variety

Ownership
- Owner: Harford Community College

History
- Call sign meaning: Harford Community College

Technical information
- Licensing authority: FCC
- Facility ID: 26024
- Class: A
- ERP: 1,100 watts
- HAAT: 69.0 meters
- Transmitter coordinates: 39°33′22.00″N 76°16′48.00″W

Links
- Public license information: Public file; LMS
- Website: whfc911.org

WHFC (91.1 FM) is a radio station broadcasting a Variety format. Licensed to Bel Air, Maryland, United States, it serves its native Harford County, the Baltimore area, as well as northern and central Maryland and southern Pennsylvania. The station is currently owned by Harford Community College, and is one of the few college radio stations in Maryland to permit students to hold on air positions. Its general manager is Terry Trouyet.

As of late 2008, the station's variety format offers jazz, classical, adult alternative, blues, folk and new-age music and local talk radio, as well as a wide range of diverse specialty programming such as Celtic music, oldies, bluegrass and Golden Age of Radio shows. In addition to its original programming, WHFC also carries several nationally syndicated shows, including NPR's Latino USA and Jazz at Lincoln Center, the WoodSongs Old-Time Radio Hour, the Putumayo World Music Hour, Acoustic Cafe, and Travel with Rick Steves, among others. It was the first station in Maryland to carry the Moody Radio Network's In the Studio with Michael Card.

From midnight to 7AM, the station broadcasts a mix of new age, contemporary instrumental, and lite jazz music, called The Night Shift.

Early in 2008, Ed McBride, a veteran of Baltimore radio and native of Derry, Northern Ireland, joined the volunteer staff of WHFC with his program Reflections of Ireland which had previously aired on WTMD prior to that station's format change in 2006. Reflections of Ireland is the third Irish- or Celtic-based program in the station's lineup, joining WHFC's The Pub and the syndicated Celtic Connections.
