= WJEP =

- Cusseta, Georgia; United States
- Broadcast area: Richland, Georgia; Lumpkin, Georgia
- Frequency: 91.1 MHz
- Branding: Worship 24/7

Programming
- Format: Christian radio

Ownership
- Owner: Media Ministries

Technical information
- Licensing authority: FCC
- Facility ID: 177011
- Class: A
- ERP: 1,650 watts
- HAAT: 134 meters (440 ft)
- Transmitter coordinates: 32°08′10″N 84°41′24″W

Links
- Public license information: Public file; LMS
- Webcast: Listen live
- Website: worship247.com

WJEP (91.1 FM) is a Christian radio station licensed to Cusseta, Georgia. The station serves the areas of Richland, Georgia and Lumpkin, Georgia, and is owned by Media Ministries
