= WHSK =

- Bloomsburg, Pennsylvania; United States
- Broadcast area: Sunbury-Selinsgrove-Lewisburg area
- Frequency: 91.1 MHz
- Branding: The Revolution

Programming
- Format: Variety

Ownership
- Owner: Bloomsburg Univ. of Pennsylvania

History
- Former call signs: WBUQ (1984–2019)

Technical information
- Licensing authority: FCC
- Facility ID: 5881
- Class: A
- ERP: 600 watts
- HAAT: −22 metres (−72 ft)
- Transmitter coordinates: 41°0′29.00″N 76°26′51.00″W

Links
- Public license information: Public file; LMS

WHSK (91.1 FM, "The HUSKY") is a college radio station licensed to serve the community of Bloomsburg, Pennsylvania. The station is owned by Bloomsburg University of Pennsylvania, and airs a variety format.

The station was assigned the call sign WBUQ by the Federal Communications Commission on October 11, 1984. It changed the call sign to WHSK on July 3, 2019.

== See also ==
- List of college radio stations in the United States
