= WGTI =

- Winfall, North Carolina; United States
- Broadcast area: Elizabeth City–Nags Head; Hampton Roads
- Frequency: 97.7 MHz
- Branding: Air1

Programming
- Format: Worship music
- Network: Air1

Ownership
- Owner: Educational Media Foundation

Technical information
- Licensing authority: FCC
- Facility ID: 173
- Class: C2
- ERP: 31,000 watts
- HAAT: 157 meters (515 ft)
- Transmitter coordinates: 36°18′40″N 76°17′34″W

Links
- Public license information: Public file; LMS
- Webcast: Listen Live
- Website: air1.com

WGTI (97.7 FM) is an Air1-affiliated radio station broadcasting a worship music format. Licensed to Winfall, North Carolina, United States, it serves the Elizabeth City-Nags Head area as well as the Hampton Roads area. The station is currently owned by the Educational Media Foundation.
