= WITR =

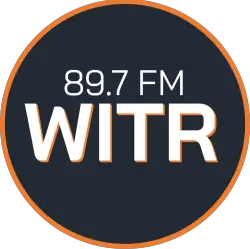
- Henrietta, New York; United States
- Frequency: 89.7 MHz
- Branding: WITR 89.7 "Modern Music and More"

Programming
- Format: College

Ownership
- Owner: Rochester Institute of Technology

History
- First air date: 1961 (600 AM); 1975 (89.7 FM)
- Call sign meaning: "Institute of Technology, Rochester"

Technical information
- Licensing authority: FCC
- Facility ID: 57280
- Class: A
- ERP: 3,000 watts, Stereo
- HAAT: 38 meters (125 feet)
- Transmitter coordinates: 43°05′10″N 77°40′04″W

Links
- Public license information: Public file; LMS
- Webcast: Listen Live
- Website: witr.rit.edu

WITR (89.7 FM) is a student-run broadcast radio station in Henrietta, New York. It is a college radio station, owned by the Rochester Institute of Technology. It was assigned the WITR call letters by the Federal Communications Commission.

WITR first went on the air as an AM station (600 kHz) in 1961, when RIT was still located in downtown Rochester. The station moved with the campus to Henrietta in 1968, and transitioned to FM in 1975.

The office and recording studios are located in the first floor of the Student Alumni Union; in 2015 a new studio, Studio X, was constructed on the main floor of the Student Alumni Union. In March 2010, the station unveiled a new logo and branding, changing from "Modern Music and More" to "The Pulse of Music". On May 9, 2022, at 4 p.m., after stunting with a loop of "It's the End of the World as We Know It (And I Feel Fine)" by R.E.M., Christmas songs, and other musical styles, the station reverted back to the "Modern Music and More" format with a new curated music library, website, and logo.

WITR is marketed as an independent music station and broadcasts a variety of genres, in addition to its regularly scheduled and typically automated indie music format. Weekly shows are produced in-studio by students and feature the following genres: world, hip-hop, R&B, rock, modern metal, hardcore, disco, house, jazz, ska, punk rock, Spanish/Latin, reggae, electronica, gospel, blues, news, classical, punk, and glam. In particular, the "Reggae Sounds" program is claimed to be the longest-running reggae program in North America.

WITR additionally broadcasts sporting events, serving as the flagship station for RIT Tigers men's ice hockey games, which simulcasts locally on WHTK.

On September 14, 2023, WITR received FCC authorization to increase its broadcast power from 910 watts to 3,000 watts.

The logo prior to 2010

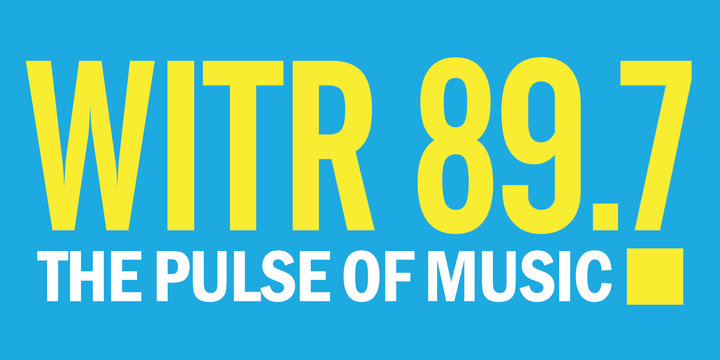
"The Pulse of Music"-era logo, from 2010 to 2022
