= WHCE =

- Highland Springs, Virginia; United States
- Broadcast area: Metro Richmond
- Frequency: 91.1 MHz
- Branding: Mix91fm

Programming
- Format: Contemporary hits

Ownership
- Owner: Henrico County Public Schools; (Henrico County Schools)

History
- First air date: September 29, 1980
- Former call signs: WHCE-FM (1980–1981); WHCE (1981–2003); DWHCE (2003–2004); WHCE (2004–Present)
- Call sign meaning: Henrico County Education

Technical information
- Licensing authority: FCC
- Facility ID: 26916
- Class: A
- ERP: 3,000 watts
- HAAT: 32 meters (105 ft)
- Transmitter coordinates: 37°32′18.50″N 77°19′25.90″W

Links
- Public license information: Public file; LMS
- Webcast: Listen live
- Website: blogs.henrico.k12.va.us/mix91

WHCE is a non-commercial contemporary hit radio formatted broadcast radio station. The station is licensed to Highland Springs, Virginia and Metro Richmond in Virginia. WHCE is owned by Henrico County Public Schools and operated under their Henrico County Schools.

On-air operations are handled by the students at the Advance Career Education Center at Highland Springs, which was previously called the Highland Springs Technical Center.
