= WJJW =

- North Adams, Massachusetts; United States
- Broadcast area: Northern Berkshire County, Massachusetts
- Frequency: 91.1 MHz
- Branding: Massachusetts College Radio

Programming
- Format: Variety

Ownership
- Owner: Massachusetts College of Liberal Arts

History
- First air date: September 5, 1973
- Former frequencies: 89.5 MHz (1973–1976)

Technical information
- Facility ID: 49102
- Class: A
- ERP: 423 watts
- HAAT: −253 meters (−830 ft)
- Transmitter coordinates: 42°41′27.2″N 73°6′14.3″W

Links
- Website: WJJW Website

WJJW (91.1 FM) is a radio station broadcasting a variety format. Licensed to North Adams, Massachusetts, United States, the station serves the Northern Berkshire County area. The station is owned by the Massachusetts College of Liberal Arts.

The callsign WJJW had previously been assigned to a radio station in Wyandotte, Michigan, broadcasting at 103.1 MHz. The Michigan station operated from September 11, 1947, to May 1, 1951.

== See also ==
- Campus radio
- List of college radio stations in the United States
