= WJHS (FM) =

- Columbia City, Indiana; United States
- Frequency: 91.5 MHz
- Branding: WJHS 91.5 FM

Programming
- Format: Adult album alternative

Ownership
- Owner: Columbia City Joint High School

History
- Call sign meaning: Former broadcasting from the Joint High School

Technical information
- Licensing authority: FCC
- Facility ID: 12423
- Class: A
- ERP: 2,650 watts
- HAAT: 67 metres (220 ft)
- Transmitter coordinates: 41°10′4″N 85°29′41″W

Links
- Public license information: Public file; LMS
- Website: https://www.wccsonline.com/o/cchs/page/overview-wjhs

WJHS (91.5 FM) is a radio station that serves the community based in Columbia City, Indiana. The station is owned by Whitley County Consolidated School. WJHS airs an adult album alternative music format from the studios located at Columbia City High School. Sometimes called Triple A, music WJHS brings a unique playlist to the area West of Fort Wayne, Indiana.

WJHS covers the counties of:

- Noble County - north.
- Allen County - east.
- Huntington County - south.
- Wabash County - southwest.
- Kosciusko County - west.

== Overview ==
WJHS is Columbia City High School's non-commercial, not-for-profit, student-run radio station. WJHS brings you 24/7 music, CCHS sports, events, the future content creator projects, as well as CCHS/ETA news and community events.

Your input is essential to making WJHS responsive to the community and student education. Follow WJHS for more.

== WJHS Social Media ==
- Webpage
- Facebook
- Instagram
- Twitter
- Twitch (pending)
- Youtube

The station was assigned the WJHS call letters by the Federal Communications Commission on April 11, 1985, and on August 24 of that same year, WJHS became an affiliate of AT40 with Casey Kasem.
