= WIRE (FM) =

- Lebanon, Indiana; United States
- Frequency: 91.1 MHz
- Branding: Radio Mom 91 Dot 1 FM

Programming
- Format: Adult Top 40

Ownership
- Owner: Community Radio Partners

History
- First air date: 2000
- Former call signs: WWRE (1998)

Technical information
- Licensing authority: FCC
- Facility ID: 87829
- Class: A
- ERP: 3,200 watts
- HAAT: 65 meters (213 ft)
- Transmitter coordinates: 40°3′48.00″N 86°26′29.00″W

Links
- Public license information: Public file; LMS
- Webcast: WIRE Webstream
- Website: WIRE Online

WIRE (91.1 FM, "Radio Mom 91 Dot 1 FM") is a radio station broadcasting an Adult Top 40 format. Licensed to Lebanon, Indiana, United States, the station is currently owned by Community Radio Partners.

== History ==
The Federal Communications Commission issued a construction permit for the station on March 27, 1998. The station was assigned the call sign WWRE on April 24, 1998, and changed its call sign to the current WIRE on June 28, 1998. On November 9, 2000, the station received its license to cover. On January 5, 2015, the FCC approved the sale of WIRE to Community Radio Partners; they closed on the purchase on February 28, 2015, at a price of $205,000.
