= WJKW (FM) =

- Athens, Ohio; United States
- Frequency: 95.9 MHz
- Branding: Ohio's Christian Super Station

Programming
- Format: Contemporary Christian

Ownership
- Owner: Christian Faith Broadcast

Technical information
- Licensing authority: FCC
- Facility ID: 11035
- Class: A
- ERP: 5,500 watts
- HAAT: 104.0 meters (341.2 ft)
- Transmitter coordinates: 39°14′10.00″N 82°4′16.00″W

Links
- Public license information: Public file; LMS
- Website: wjkw.net

WJKW (95.9 FM) is a radio station broadcasting a Contemporary Christian format. Licensed to Athens, Ohio, United States. The station is currently owned by Christian Faith Broadcast.
