= KLSU =

- Baton Rouge, Louisiana; United States
- Broadcast area: Baton Rouge metropolitan area
- Frequency: 91.1 MHz

Programming
- Format: Free-form; College radio; Adult album alternative

Ownership
- Owner: Louisiana State University

History
- Founded: November 15, 1965
- First air date: November 15, 1979
- Former call signs: WPRG (1979–1982)
- Call sign meaning: Louisiana State University

Technical information
- Facility ID: 38604
- Class: C3
- ERP: 23,000 watts
- HAAT: 49 meters (161 ft)
- Transmitter coordinates: 30°24′37″N 91°10′37″W

Links
- Webcast: Listen live
- Website: klsuradio.fm

KLSU (91.1 FM) is a non-commercial educational radio station licensed to Baton Rouge, Louisiana, United States. Owned by Louisiana State University, it has a free-form/college radio format, playing adult album alternative music with other genres, and is part of the university's Student Media Program. The studios and offices are in the basement of Hodges Hall.

The transmitter tower is atop Choppin Hall, off Tower Road, on the LSU campus in Baton Rouge.

== History ==
=== WLSU and WPRG ===
The station began on November 15, 1965, as a carrier current AM station, only heard in the dorms and buildings on campus. It was not regulated by the FCC. To sound like a real radio station, it used the call sign WLSU, with the initials standing for the university's name.

The university wanted an FM radio station to be heard not just on campus but around the Baton Rouge area. The FCC gave it a construction permit to build an FM station in the late 1970s. The FM station officially signed on the air on November 15, 1979. Its call sign was WPRG and it broadcast at 107.3 MHz. The power was only eight watts. It usually broadcast from 7 a.m. to 2 a.m. with mostly rock shows. It played classical music on Sunday mornings and Jazz was heard on Saturday and Sunday nights.

Almost immediately, the station petitioned the FCC to allow it to move its frequency to 91.1 MHz and boost its power. A few years later, it was permitted to relocate to the non-commercial frequency and increase its power to 5,700 watts.

=== KLSU ===
The station was given randomly assigned call letters as WPRG. It could not be called WLSU because that is the call sign of the college station at the University of Wisconsin–La Crosse. So station management tried a different approach to get the university's initials in its call letters.

KLSU is unusual in that its call sign begins with a K but is located on the east side on the Mississippi River. Most stations on that side of the Mississippi have call letters beginning with a W. Because KLSU would be located within a mile of the Mississippi River, in 1982 the FCC granted an exemption to the K–W rule so it could have LSU in its call sign.

For most of its history, KLSU was a low-power Class A station. In April 2016, KLSU significantly upgraded its power to 23,000 watts. It is now classified a Class C3 station.

== See also ==
- Campus radio
- List of college radio stations in the United States
