= WDBX =

Community radio station in Carbondale, Illinois

- Carbondale, Illinois; United States
- Broadcast area: Marion-Carbondale (IL) area
- Frequency: 91.1 MHz
- Branding: Community Radio for Southern Illinois

Programming
- Format: Free-form
- Affiliations: Pacifica Radio

Ownership
- Owner: Heterodyne Broadcasting Company

History
- First air date: January 11, 1996

Technical information
- Licensing authority: FCC
- Facility ID: 27099
- Class: A
- ERP: 3,000 watts
- HAAT: 40 meters
- Transmitter coordinates: 37°43′43.10″N 89°12′57.30″W

Links
- Public license information: Public file; LMS
- Website: wdbx.org

WDBX (91.1 FM, "Community Radio for Southern Illinois") is a radio station broadcasting an free-form community radio format. Licensed to Carbondale, Illinois, United States. the station serves the Marion-Carbondale (IL) area. The station is currently owned by local 501(c)3 nonprofit under the name Heterodyne Broadcasting.

== History ==
WDBX became officially licensed and operational at the start of 1996. It serves as an outlet for local programming with many of the DJs and staff being from the local area. Apart from serving the Carbondale-Marion area, the station is capable of covering the entirety of Jackson and Williamson County as well certain areas within the counties of Franklin, Johnson, Perry, Saline, and Union. Apart from local programs, some shows are syndicated from Pacifica Radio. WDBX also dabbles in high school athletics with broadcasts of Murphysboro Red Devils football and boys basketball games in a partnership with River Radio of Southern Illinois.
