= WJNH =

Coordinates: 44°03′30″N 71°05′31″W

- Conway, New Hampshire; United States
- Frequency: 91.1 MHz
- Branding: New Hampshire Gospel Radio

Programming
- Format: Christian radio

Ownership
- Owner: New Hampshire Gospel Radio, Inc.

History
- Former call signs: WPHH (2009–2010); WMTP (2010–2022)

Technical information
- Licensing authority: FCC
- Facility ID: 171251
- Class: A
- ERP: 90 watts
- HAAT: 264 meters (866 ft)

Links
- Public license information: Public file; LMS
- Website: nhgr.org

WJNH is a Christian radio station licensed to Conway, New Hampshire, and serving the North Conway, New Hampshire, and Fryeburg, Maine, areas, broadcasting on 91.1 FM. WJNH is owned by New Hampshire Gospel Radio, Inc.

Originally licensed in 2012, holding the call sign holding the call sign WMTP, its call sign was changed to WJNH on April 11, 2022.
