= WYGS =

Southern Gospel radio station serving Cincinnati area

- Hope, Indiana; United States
- Broadcast area: Columbus, Indiana
- Frequency: 91.1 MHz

Programming
- Format: Southern gospel

Ownership
- Owner: Good Shepherd Radio, Inc.
- Sister stations: WKJD

Technical information
- Licensing authority: FCC
- Facility ID: 90693
- Class: A
- ERP: 380 watts
- HAAT: 100 meters (330 ft)
- Transmitter coordinates: 39°13′35″N 85°44′47″W

Links
- Public license information: Public file; LMS
- Webcast: Listen live
- Website: wygs.org

WYGS (91.1 FM) is a radio station broadcasting a southern gospel format licensed to Hope, Indiana, United States. It serves the Columbus, Indiana area. The station is currently owned by Good Shepherd Radio, Inc.

WYGS is also heard on WKRY 88.1 in Versailles, Indiana, WAUZ 89.1 in Greensburg, Indiana, WHMO 91.1 in Madison, Indiana, and W248AF 97.5 in Batesville, Indiana.

Call sign	Frequency	City of license	FID	ERP (W)	Class	FCC info
WKRY	88.1 FM	Versailles, Indiana	91416	500	A	LMS
WAUZ	89.1 FM	Greensburg, Indiana	81833	800	A	LMS
WHMO	91.1 FM	Madison, Indiana	172366	2,400	A	LMS
W248AF	97.5 FM	Batesville, Indiana	142694	120	D	LMS

Former logo
