= WHRM (FM) =

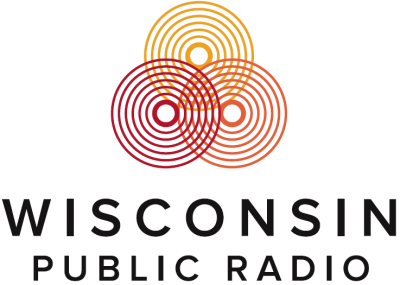
- Wausau, Wisconsin; United States
- Broadcast area: Wausau/Stevens Point
- Frequency: 90.9 MHz (HD Radio)
- Branding: WPR News and Classical

Programming
- Format: Public radio; classical music; news
- Subchannels: HD2: Classical Service; HD3: Ideas Network
- Network: Wisconsin Public Radio
- Affiliations: NPR; American Public Media

Ownership
- Owner: Wisconsin Educational Communications Board; (State of Wisconsin - Educational Communications Board)

History
- First air date: 1949 (as WHSF)
- Former call signs: WHSF (1949)
- Call sign meaning: WHA Rib Mountain (local landmark/transmitter site)

Technical information
- Licensing authority: FCC
- Facility ID: 63083
- Class: C0
- ERP: 82,000 watts
- HAAT: 329 meters (1,079 ft)
- Translator: HD3: 101.3 W267BB (Wausau)

Links
- Public license information: Public file; LMS
- Webcast: Listen live
- Website: www.wpr.org

WHRM (90.9 MHz) is an FM radio station licensed to Wausau, Wisconsin, serving the Wausau/Stevens Point area. The station is part of Wisconsin Public Radio (WPR), and airs WPR's "NPR News and Classical Network", consisting of classical music and news and talk programming. WHRM also broadcasts regional news and programming from studios in the Center for Civic Engagement at the University of Wisconsin-Stevens Point at Wausau.

The station signed on as WHSF, the fourth FM station in what would become Wisconsin Public Radio.

== HD Radio ==
WHRM airs Ideas Network programming on its third HD Radio subchannel–the first such arrangement in the WPR network. This is because most of north-central Wisconsin does not have a clear 24-hour signal from the Ideas Network. Sister station WLBL in Auburndale must reduce its power to an all-but unlistenable level at night, while WLBL-FM in Wausau is maintained under a time-share arrangement with WXPW which splits that signal's time among the two organizations. In September 2017, the WHRM-HD3 signal began to be translated full-time as an analog signal over W267BB (101.3) in the Wausau area.

The network's HD2 Classical Service is aired on WHRM-HD2.

- See also Wisconsin Public Radio
