= WHRM =

WHRM may refer to:

- WHRM (FM), a radio station (90.9 FM) licensed to serve Wausau, Wisconsin, United States
- WHRM-TV, a television station (channel 24, virtual 20) licensed to serve Wausau, Wisconsin
