= WSSU =

WSSU may refer to:

- Winston-Salem State University
- WSSU (FM), a radio station (88.5 FM) licensed to serve Superior, Wisconsin, United States
- WUIS, a radio station (91.9 FM) licensed to serve Springfield, Illinois, United States, which held the call sign WSSU from 1989 to 1995
- KUWS, a radio station (91.3 FM) licensed to serve Superior, Wisconsin, which held the call sign WSSU from 1966 to 1988
