= WLBL =

WLBL may refer to:

- WLBL (AM), a radio station (930 AM) licensed to Auburndale, Wisconsin, United States
- WLBL-FM, a radio station (91.9 FM) licensed to Wausau, Wisconsin, United States
