= WHLA =

WHLA may refer to:

- WHLA (FM), a radio station (90.3 FM) licensed to serve La Crosse, Wisconsin, United States
- WHLA-TV, a television station (channel 15, virtual 31) licensed to serve La Crosse, Wisconsin
