= WHBM =

- Park Falls, Wisconsin; United States
- Frequency: 90.3 MHz
- Branding: WPR Ideas

Programming
- Format: Public radio, News
- Affiliations: Wisconsin Public Radio; NPR; American Public Media

Ownership
- Owner: State of Wisconsin - Educational Communications Board; (State of Wisconsin - Educational Communications Board)
- Sister stations: WLEF-TV

History
- Call sign meaning: A nod to WPT flagship WHA/Madison as well as Harold B. McCarty, an early WHA program director and head of the forerunners to the WPR and PBS Wisconsin networks.

Technical information
- Licensing authority: FCC
- Facility ID: 63058
- Class: C1
- ERP: 35,000 watts
- HAAT: 217 meters (712 ft)

Links
- Public license information: Public file; LMS
- Webcast: Listen Live
- Website: wpr.org

WHBM (90.3 FM) is a radio station licensed to Park Falls, Wisconsin. The station is part of Wisconsin Public Radio (WPR), and airs WPR's "Ideas Network", consisting of news and talk programming.

- See also Wisconsin Public Radio
