= WHAA =

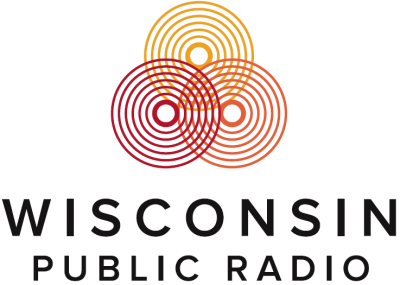
- Adams, Wisconsin; United States
- Broadcast area: Wisconsin Dells
- Frequency: 89.1 MHz
- Branding: WPR Ideas

Programming
- Format: Public radio; news
- Network: Wisconsin Public Radio
- Affiliations: NPR; American Public Media

Ownership
- Owner: Wisconsin Educational Communications Board; (State of Wisconsin - Educational Communications Board)

History
- First air date: June 26, 2007
- Call sign meaning: WHA, Adams County

Technical information
- Licensing authority: FCC
- Facility ID: 91555
- Class: C2
- ERP: 28,500 watts
- HAAT: 177 meters (581 ft)

Links
- Public license information: Public file; LMS
- Webcast: Listen live
- Website: www.wpr.org

WHAA (89.1 FM) is a radio station licensed to Adams, Wisconsin. The station is part of Wisconsin Public Radio (WPR), and airs WPR's "Ideas Network", consisting of news and talk programming. WHAA covers a large previously underserved portion of Southern Central Wisconsin along the Wisconsin River providing city grade WPR reception to areas such as Wisconsin Rapids, Portage, Adams and Juneau counties as well as popular tourist areas such as Wisconsin Dells, Castle Rock Lake and Petenwell Lake.

- See also Wisconsin Public Radio
