= WLBL-FM =

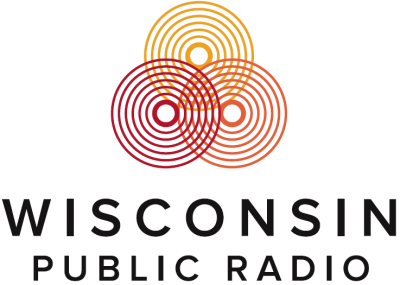
- Wausau, Wisconsin; United States
- Frequency: 91.9 MHz
- Branding: WPR Ideas

Programming
- Format: Public radio, news
- Affiliations: Wisconsin Public Radio; WXPR; NPR; American Public Media

Ownership
- Owner: Wisconsin Educational Communications Board; (State of Wisconsin - Educational Communications Board)
- Sister stations: WHRM-TV, WHRM-FM

History
- First air date: October 28, 1994
- Call sign meaning: "Wisconsin, Land of Beautiful Lakes" (from sister AM operation in Auburndale)

Technical information
- Licensing authority: FCC
- Facility ID: 63031
- Class: A
- ERP: 54 watts
- HAAT: 255 meters (837 ft)
- Transmitter coordinates: 44.921°N 89.691°W
- Translators: 101.3 W267BB (Wausau, translating WHRM-HD3)

Links
- Public license information: Public file; LMS
- Webcast: Listen Live
- Website: wpr.org

WLBL-FM (91.9 MHz) is a radio station licensed to Wausau, Wisconsin. The station is part of Wisconsin Public Radio (WPR), and airs WPR's "Ideas Network", consisting of news and talk programming. WLBL-FM also broadcasts local news and programming from studios in the Center for Civic Engagement at the University of Wisconsin-Marathon County in Wausau.

In a share-time arrangement, WLBL shares 91.9 with WXPW, a satellite of WXPR in Rhinelander. WLBL airs from midnight to 6 pm Monday through Friday and from 5 pm to midnight on Sunday. Because of this, an HD Radio subchannel of the full Ideas Network schedule is heard on the third digital subchannel of WHRM-FM (90.9), a sister station to WLBL which carries WPR's NPR News and Classical service. In September 2017, the WHRM-HD3 signal began to be translated full-time as an analog signal over W267BB (101.3) in the Wausau area.
