= WHAD =

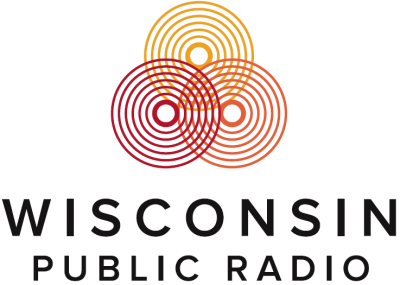
- Delafield, Wisconsin; United States
- Broadcast area: Milwaukee and Madison, Wisconsin
- Frequency: 90.7 MHz (HD Radio)

Programming
- Format: Classical music
- Subchannels: HD2: WPR News
- Network: Wisconsin Public Radio Music
- Affiliations: NPR; APM; PRX; BBC World Service

Ownership
- Owner: Wisconsin Educational Communications Board

History
- First air date: May 30, 1948
- Call sign meaning: WHA Delafield

Technical information
- Licensing authority: FCC
- Facility ID: 63091
- Class: B
- ERP: 72,000 watts
- HAAT: 208 meters (682 ft)
- Transmitter coordinates: 43°1′42″N 88°23′32.3″W

Links
- Public license information: Public file; LMS
- Webcast: www.wpr.org/ways-to-listen
- Website: www.wpr.org

WHAD (90.7 FM) is a non-commercial educational radio station licensed to Delafield, Wisconsin, United States, and serves sections of Greater Milwaukee and the Madison metropolitan area. It is part of the "WPR Music" classical music service of Wisconsin Public Radio (WPR), with studios on the seventh floor of 310 West Wisconsin Avenue in Milwaukee. It is one of two full NPR member stations in Milwaukee, the other being the University of Wisconsin-Milwaukee's WUWM, licensed to Milwaukee proper.

WHAD's transmitter is sited on Government Hill, off Reservoir Road near Wisconsin Highway 83 in Delafield, roughly equidistant from both Milwaukee and Madison, so WHAD can serve listeners in both cities. WHAD broadcasts in HD Radio; the HD2 digital subchannel carries WPR's News network.

== History ==
The station signed on the air on May 30, 1948. The current-day WHAD is of no relation to the WHAD in Milwaukee which broadcast in the 1920s and early 1930s under the ownership of Marquette University. That station merged in 1934 into what is now the current-day WISN. WHAD was the second FM station of Wisconsin Educational Radio, forerunner of WPR. It is one of the oldest FM outlets in the state. The call sign takes WHA's call sign and adds a D for the community of Delafield.

For many years, WHAD was part of WPR's news and talk "Ideas Network". It maintained a local news staff and cut-ins outside of the main WPR network, and the station's facilities originated some programming for the network, including Kathleen Dunn's afternoon program until her retirement in the summer of 2017. WHAD also had its own 414 studio line for Milwaukee callers to call into locally originated programs. Because of the lack of a sister station providing WPR's News and Classical Network to Milwaukee, WHAD aired the HD2 Classical Network via HD Radio to the market via their HD2 subchannel, which only differed from the News and Classical Network in having additional classical music programming overlaying NPR and APM news programming exclusive to WUWM in the market; it became the market's only classical music station over the air in 2007 after WFMR abandoned the format commercially.

The station's transmitter is located in western Waukesha County just south of Delafield, almost halfway between Milwaukee and Madison. The tower was placed there to provide nighttime Ideas Network coverage to some eastern portions of Madison since Ideas Network flagship WHA originally was a daytimer, required to sign off at sunset. While WHA has operated 24 hours a day since 1987, it must reduce its signal to all-but-unlistenable levels at sunset. WHAD thus continued to provide nighttime Ideas Network coverage to eastern Madison.

WHAD once operated an FM translator at 107.9 in Madison to provide Ideas Network service to downtown and eastern Madison at night. This translator is now counted as part of the WHA license. WHAD also served as the de facto WPR Ideas outlet for the Janesville-Beloit area until the sign on of WHA translator W262DD on 100.3 FM. The WHAD signal also reaches into Lake and McHenry County, Illinois, in Chicago's northern suburbs, complementing WEPS' coverage of this area.

WHAD's transmitter is located further south and west than most of Milwaukee's other major FM stations not only to provide some coverage of Madison, but also to ensure that it is within 15 miles of its city of license as required by the FCC. Delafield is located in the western portion of Milwaukee's inner ring. In contrast, most of Milwaukee's FM stations transmit from various towers across Milwaukee's north side. As a result, WHAD's signal is marginal in the northern part of the market. Sister stations WRST in Oshkosh and WSHS in Sheboygan provide Ideas Network service to the northern part of the nine-county Milwaukee market area, but other distant portions didn't get a clear signal for Ideas Network programming at all until the advent of streaming audio.

With the restructuring of WPR's networks in May 2024, WHAD joined the WPR Music network, with the HD2 channel switching to the WPR News Network. NPR news, talk and entertainment programming remains on WUWM in analog radio across the market.

== See also ==
- Wisconsin Public Radio
