= WHWC (FM) =

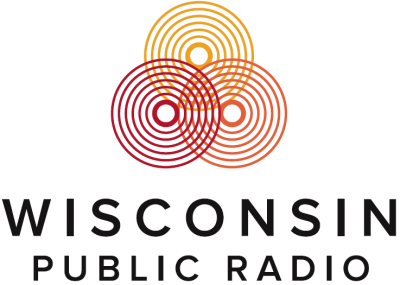
- Menomonie, Wisconsin; United States
- Broadcast area: Eau Claire
- Frequency: 88.3 MHz
- Branding: WPR News

Programming
- Language: English
- Format: Public radio; news
- Network: Wisconsin Public Radio
- Affiliations: NPR; American Public Media

Ownership
- Owner: Wisconsin Educational Communications Board; (State of Wisconsin - Educational Communications Board)

History
- First air date: 1950
- Call sign meaning: "WHA West Central Wisconsin"

Technical information
- Licensing authority: FCC
- Facility ID: 63078
- Class: C1
- ERP: 70,000 watts
- HAAT: 320 m (1,050 ft)

Links
- Public license information: Public file; LMS
- Webcast: Listen live
- Website: www.wpr.org

WHWC (88.3 MHz) is an FM radio station licensed to Menomonie, Wisconsin, United States, serving the Eau Claire area. The station is part of Wisconsin Public Radio (WPR), and aired WPR's Ideas Network until the 2024 format change, when it switched to WPR News. WHWC also broadcasts regional news and programming from studios in Wisconsin Public Broadcasting's regional center in Eau Claire.
