= Karl Schmidt (broadcaster) =

American broadcaster

Karl Schmidt (died April 2016) was an American radio broadcaster from Wisconsin who created the radio drama series Earplay. Schmidt spent the majority of his career at station WHA and Wisconsin Public Radio. He began his career as a University of Wisconsin student at WHA in 1941, and later served in the military during World War II with Armed Forces Radio. After completing his degree at the University of Wisconsin, Schmidt pursued a career in radio drama in New York. Later, Schmidt returned to WHA to host and produce radio programs, and also served as director of the National Center for Audio Experimentation. He also held positions with the National Association of Educational Broadcasters and NPR. In 1971, Schmidt created the radio drama series Earplay, which broadcast original plays and won several awards during its run, including a Peabody Award and the Prix Italia. Schmidt was also a reader for the WPR series Chapter a Day, appearing on the program from 1941 until his death in 2016. He was inducted into the Wisconsin Broadcasters Hall of Fame in 2013.
