= WHHI =

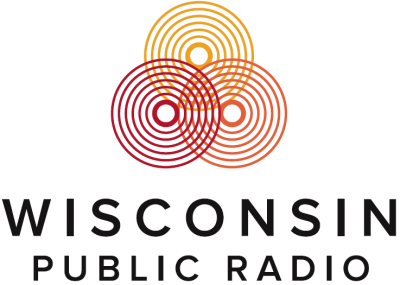
- Highland, Wisconsin; United States
- Broadcast area: Dodgeville/Platteville
- Frequency: 91.3 MHz (HD Radio)
- Branding: WPR Music

Programming
- Language: English
- Format: Classical music
- Subchannels: HD2: News
- Affiliations: Wisconsin Public Radio; NPR; American Public Media

Ownership
- Owner: Wisconsin Educational Communications Board

History
- First air date: 1952
- Call sign meaning: Disambiguation of WHA, HIghland

Technical information
- Licensing authority: FCC
- Facility ID: 63056
- Class: C1
- ERP: 100,000 watts
- HAAT: 170.4 meters (559 ft)

Links
- Public license information: Public file; LMS
- Webcast: Listen Live
- Website: wpr.org

WHHI (91.3 FM) is a radio station licensed to Highland, Wisconsin, and serving the Dodgeville area. WHHI's 100kw signal covers a large swath of Southwest Wisconsin, Northwest Illinois and Northeast Iowa including into the Dubuque area as well as extreme southeast portions of Minnesota. The station is part of Wisconsin Public Radio (WPR), and airs WPR's Music Network on FM/HD1 consisting of classical music, and WPR's News Network on HD2, consisting of news and talk programming.

WHHI broadcasts in the HD Radio (hybrid) format.

The station signed on in 1952 as the seventh FM station of Wisconsin Educational Radio, forerunner of Wisconsin Public Radio.

== Translators ==
WHHI previously was relayed in Madison on translator W215AQ broadcasting at 90.9. This translator was installed to provide some Ideas Network service to Madison's west side when Ideas Network flagship WHA must reduce its power to an all-but-unlistenable level at night. In 2009, the translator was moved to WHA's license.

== See also ==
- Wisconsin Public Radio
