= KUWS =

- Superior, Wisconsin; United States
- Broadcast area: Northwest Wisconsin and Northeast Minnesota
- Frequency: 91.3 MHz
- Branding: Wisconsin Public Radio

Programming
- Format: Public; talk/jazz/alternative

Ownership
- Owner: University of Wisconsin System

History
- First air date: January 31, 1966
- Former call signs: WSSU (1966–1988)
- Call sign meaning: University of Wisconsin-Superior

Technical information
- Licensing authority: FCC
- Facility ID: 4289
- Class: C1
- ERP: 83,000 watts
- HAAT: 197 m (646 ft)
- Transmitter coordinates: 46.789°N 92.114°W
- Repeaters: 90.9 WUWS (Ashland, WI)

Links
- Public license information: Public file; LMS
- Website: uwsuper.edu//91-3-fm-kuws

KUWS is a public radio station in Superior, Wisconsin, licensed to the Board of Regents of the University of Wisconsin System and operated by the University of Wisconsin–Superior since January 31, 1966. KUWS is an affiliate of Wisconsin Public Radio's Music Network. It also airs university and student-produced programming weeknights with 91 Jazz St. from 7:00 to 10:00 and College Rock from 10:00 to 1:00 am.* KUWS broadcasts on 91.3 FM with 83,000 watts. KUWS was previously heard on translator station W275AF in the Ashland-Washburn-Bayfield area at 102.5 FM before September 12, 2011, when full-power WUWS (90.9) was launched from Ashland, replacing W275AF. WUWS continues to relay KUWS's schedule and is programmed from WPR's Superior studios.

The original station call letters were WSSU, representing Wisconsin Superior State University. The call letters KUWS were assigned on August 1, 1988, as part of the station's affiliation with Wisconsin Public Radio. KUWS was permitted a "K" prefix, despite its location east of the Mississippi, due to Duluth-Superior's status as a "mixed" market, with several K-prefix stations already licensed to Superior.

The KUWS studios are in the Holden Fine Arts Center at 1805 Catlin Avenue in Superior. The studios also provide local programming for Wisconsin Public Radio's News network station for northwest Wisconsin, WHSA in Brule, as well as WHWA in Washburn, WSSU in Superior, and WUWS in Ashland. The KUWS transmitting facility is co-located with KBJR-TV in the Duluth tower farm.

== Satellite station ==
In addition to the main station, KUWS is relayed by an additional full-power station in the Chequamegon Bay and Apostle Islands region east of Superior to widen its broadcast area.

Call sign	Frequency	City of license	FID	ERP (W)	Class	FCC info
WUWS	90.9 FM	Ashland, Wisconsin	176548	24,500	C3	LMS

== See also ==
- Wisconsin Public Radio
- University of Wisconsin–Superior
