= WERN =

Public radio station in Madison, Wisconsin

Coordinates: 43.056°N 89.535°W

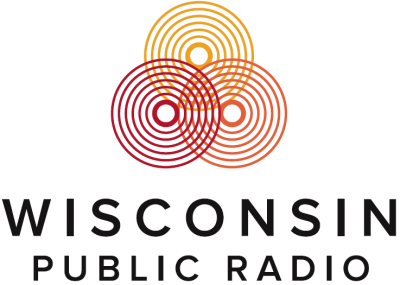
- Madison, Wisconsin; United States
- Broadcast area: Madison metropolitan area
- Frequency: 88.7 MHz (HD Radio)

Programming
- Format: Public radio and talk
- Subchannels: HD2: WPR Music
- Network: Wisconsin Public Radio
- Affiliations: NPR; APM; Classical 24

Ownership
- Owner: Wisconsin Educational Communications Board
- Sister stations: WHA

History
- First air date: March 30, 1947
- Former call signs: WHA-FM (1947–1974)
- Call sign meaning: "Wisconsin Educational Radio Network"

Technical information
- Licensing authority: FCC
- Facility ID: 63030
- Class: B
- ERP: 20,500 watts
- HAAT: 385 meters (1,263 ft)
- Translators: HD2: 90.5 W213CE (Madison); HD2: 107.9 W300BM (Madison)

Links
- Public license information: Public file; LMS
- Webcast: Listen live
- Website: www.wpr.org

WERN (88.7 FM) is a non-commercial radio station licensed to Madison, Wisconsin, United States, and serving the Madison metropolitan area. It is part of Wisconsin Public Radio (WPR) and the co-flagship of WPR's News Network alongside WHA. The studios are on the campus of the University of Wisconsin in Vilas Communication Hall, 821 University Avenue in Madison.

The transmitter is located at the Madison Community Tower, located adjacent to South Pleasant View Road on Madison's southwest side in the Junction Ridge neighborhood. WERN broadcasts using HD Radio technology; its HD-2 digital subchannel carries the WPR Music network and feeds FM translators W213CE (90.5 FM) and W300BM (107.9 FM).

== History ==
The station signed on the air on March 30, 1947 as WHA-FM. It was the first FM station in the network that would become Wisconsin Public Radio. It took its call sign Dyk sister station WHA (970 AM). At first, WHA-FM simulcast WHA's mix of classical music, news, university lectures and public affairs shows. Originally, WHA was a daytimer. When it had to go off the air at sunset, WHA-FM continued its programming.

By the late 1960s, WHA-FM began airing some programming that was separate from 970 AM. Eventually, simulcasting was reduced and the FM station sought its own identity. The call letters became WERN in 1974.

Because WHA-FM/WERN began broadcasting before current maximum levels were set by the Federal Communications Commission, the station's signal is grandfathered. It runs at a higher power for its height above average terrain (HAAT) than would be permitted today.

As part of a major realignment of WPR's offerings which took effect on May 20, 2024; WHA and WERN became the flagships of the WPR News Network, successor to the Ideas Network. Two low-powered translators that served to improve WHA's nighttime coverage switched to the all-classical WPR Music network after this realignment occurred. The change substantially improved coverage of NPR news programming in Madison. WHA had begun nighttime operations in 1987, but must reduce its power to all-but unlistenable levels at night. For decades, WPR made up for this gap in coverage with translators, fringe coverage from neighboring stations, and later HD Radio subchannels. In contrast, WERN penetrates further into south-central Wisconsin, and into buildings, than the two translators. This allows WPR News to be heard at full power 24 hours a day on a strong signal covering much of Southern Wisconsin and Northern Illinois, including parts the Rockford area and parts of Metro Milwaukee.

== See also ==
- Wisconsin Public Radio
