= WXPR =

Public radio station in Rhinelander, Wisconsin

- Rhinelander, Wisconsin; United States
- Frequency: 91.7 MHz(HD Radio)

Programming
- Format: Public radio
- Affiliations: NPR; PRX; APM; NV1

Ownership
- Owner: White Pine Community Broadcasting, Inc.

History
- First air date: April 24, 1983
- Call sign meaning: EXcellence in Public Radio

Technical information
- Licensing authority: FCC
- Facility ID: 72220
- Class: C1
- ERP: 100,000 watts
- HAAT: 128 meters
- Transmitter coordinates: 45.774444°N 89.248333°W

Links
- Public license information: Public file; LMS
- Webcast: Listen live
- Website: www.wxpr.org

WXPR (91.7 FM) is a community-licensed public radio station serving north central Wisconsin and adjacent areas of Michigan's Upper Peninsula. Licensed to Rhinelander, Wisconsin, United States, the station is owned by White Pine Community Broadcasting, a nonprofit educational corporation. WXPR is a National Public Radio member station as well as an affiliate of Native Voice One. The studios are at 28 North Stevens Street in downtown Rhinelander, in a historic building previously occupied by the local newspaper. The transmitter is off Oneida County Highway A between Sugar Camp and Three Lakes, Wisconsin, southwest of Thunder Lake.

The station operates satellite WXPW at 91.9 FM in Wausau. In a share-time arrangement, WXPW shares 91.9 with WLBL-FM, the Wausau outlet for Wisconsin Public Radio's Ideas Network. WXPW airs from 6 p.m. to 4 a.m. from Monday through Thursday and from 6 p.m. on Friday to 5 p.m. on Sunday.

== History ==
The vision for WXPR was developed by Peter Nordgren, whose previous involvement in noncommercial radio was with WSSU at the University of Wisconsin-Superior, as well as KBSB and KAXE. Other early staff and Board of Directors included local businessman Michael Seraphin, a former commercial broadcaster at WOBT in Rhinelander as well as radio stations in Wisconsin's Fox Valley and Colorado; Mary Kay Foltz Sherer, a fundraising specialist from Minocqua who would go on to be development director at Wisconsin Public Radio; retired Army Signal Corps colonel Elmer Goetsch, and construction worker Robert M. (Mick) Fiocchi of Rhinelander, later WXPR's general manager. The first program director was W. Scott Yankus, later with Minnesota Public Radio and Marketplace (radio program); other staff included news director Jeff Gavin and programming staff Rita Rahoi, later a professor of communications at Winona State University. WXPR was one of fourteen stations in underserved areas whose development in the early 1980s was supported by expansion grants from the Corporation for Public Broadcasting. A re-authorization of the Public Broadcasting Financing Act of 1975 signed by President Jimmy Carter on January 15, 1981 provided critical funds to erect a tower near Three-Lakes, Wisconsin. Additional resources included a donated used transmitter from the University of Wisconsin-Stout in June 1981 and an 18-acre transmitter site donated by Wausau Paper Mills. Local fundraising efforts raised $40,000 through membership drives in 1982 to match federal requirements. Seraphin's suggestion for call letters WXPR won out over 100 other submissions. WXPR began broadcasting at 12-noon on April 24, 1983.

== Translators ==
Call sign	Frequency	City of license	FID	ERP (W)	Class	FCC info
W265AI	100.9 FM	Ironwood, Michigan	72221	10	D	LMS
