= WGTD =

- Kenosha, Wisconsin; United States
- Broadcast area: Racine and eastern Walworth Counties - Lake County, Illinois
- Frequency: 91.1 MHz (HD Radio)
- Branding: WGTD 91.1

Programming
- Format: Public radio; news-talk
- Subchannels: HD2: Jazz; HD3: Classical "WPR Music"
- Affiliations: Wisconsin Public Radio; NPR; American Public Media

Ownership
- Owner: Gateway Technical College

History
- First air date: December 23, 1975
- Call sign meaning: Gateway Technical College

Technical information
- Licensing authority: FCC
- Facility ID: 23347
- Class: A
- ERP: 3,200 watts
- HAAT: 62 meters (203 ft)
- Transmitter coordinates: 42.609°N 87.849°W
- Translators: 101.7 W269BV (Elkhorn); 103.3 W277BM (Lake Geneva)

Links
- Public license information: Public file; LMS
- Webcast: Listen live
- Website: www.wgtd.org

WGTD (91.1 FM) is a non-commercial radio station licensed to Kenosha, Wisconsin, and serving Racine and eastern Walworth Counties along with Lake County, Illinois. Owned by Gateway Technical College, the station is affiliated with Wisconsin Public Radio. It airs the "WPR News" network, consisting of news and talk programming. WGTD occasionally breaks away from WPR to air local programming and Kenosha-focused newscasts.

WGTD is a Class A FM station. It has an effective radiated power (ERP) of 3,200 watts. Programming is also heard on two FM translators: 101.7 FM in Elkhorn and 103.3 FM in Lake Geneva. The parent station can be heard with local signal strength from Waukegan, Illinois, to the southern boarder of Milwaukee county. Translators provide coverage to most of southern Walworth county.

Until the realignment of WPR's networks on May 20, 2024, WGTD was part of WPR's "News and Classical Music" network. Classical music programming was moved to WGTD's HD3 channel, which carries the "WPR Music" network; "WPR Music" is also heard in part of WGTD's coverage area on its Milwaukee station, WHAD.

== HD Radio ==
WGTD offers two additional digital subchannels on HD Radio:

- HD2: "Jazz Blues 24/7", an automated jazz and blues format.
- HD3: "WPR Music", which primarily offers classical music.

== Translators ==
WGTD is relayed by two additional FM translator stations to serve western Racine and Kenosha, and the Geneva Lake region of Walworth County. Currently these translators offer only analog service, with no HD Radio subchannels. In 2024, the Elkhorn translator changed locations from an old municipal tower near Elkhorn's town square to a taller municipal tower near the Walworth County Courthouse.

Call sign	Frequency	City of license	FID	ERP (W)	HAAT	Transmitter coordinates	FCC info
W269BV	101.7 FM	Elkhorn, Wisconsin	147262	27	68.6 m (225 ft)	42°39′52.9″N 88°29′53.4″W	LMS
W277BM	103.3 FM	Lake Geneva, Wisconsin	147272	19	73.6 m (241 ft)	42°36′38.1″N 88°26′3.3″W	LMS
