= University of Wisconsin–Superior =

Public university in Superior, Wisconsin, US

- Former name: List: Superior Normal School (1893–1926); Superior State Teachers College (1926–1951); Wisconsin State College–Superior (1951–1964); Wisconsin State University–Superior (1964–1971)
- Type: Public liberal arts university
- Established: 1893
- Parent institution: University of Wisconsin System
- Chancellor: Renée M. Wachter
- Students: 2,877 (fall 2025)
- Undergraduates: 1,999 (fall 2025)
- Postgraduates: 878 (fall 2025)
- Location: Superior, Wisconsin, U.S. 46°43′05″N 92°05′24″W
- Campus: Urban, small city
- Colors: Black and gold
- Nickname: Yellowjackets
- Sporting affiliations: NCAA Division III; UMAC, WIAC (ice hockey)
- Mascot: Buzz the Yellowjacket
- Website: uwsuper.edu

The University of Wisconsin–Superior (UW–Superior or UWS) is a public liberal arts university in Superior, Wisconsin, United States. UW–Superior grants associate, bachelor's, master's and specialist's degrees. The university enrolls approximately 2,900 students as of fall 2025.

== History ==
Originally named "Superior Normal School", the university was founded by Wisconsin legislators as a school to train teachers in 1893. Superior Normal School's first class graduated in 1897. In 1909, the institution became Wisconsin's first normal school to offer a full-scale training program for the new idea of kindergarten. It also was the first to offer a four-year program for high school teachers beginning in 1923. After authorization to grant bachelor's degrees in education in 1926, the school took on the new name of "Superior State Teachers College". Graduate degrees were authorized in 1947 and first offered in 1950. In 1951 the state board of regents changed the institution's name to "Wisconsin State College–Superior" to better reflect its expanding role. Wisconsin's state colleges eventually were reclassified as universities, resulting in another name change in 1964 to "Wisconsin State University–Superior". In 1971 Superior became part of the University of Wisconsin System and acquired its present name. To respond to cuts in state funding, in 2018 UW-Superior suspended a number of academic programs, claiming the cuts were in order to encourage more students to graduate on time.

== Campus ==
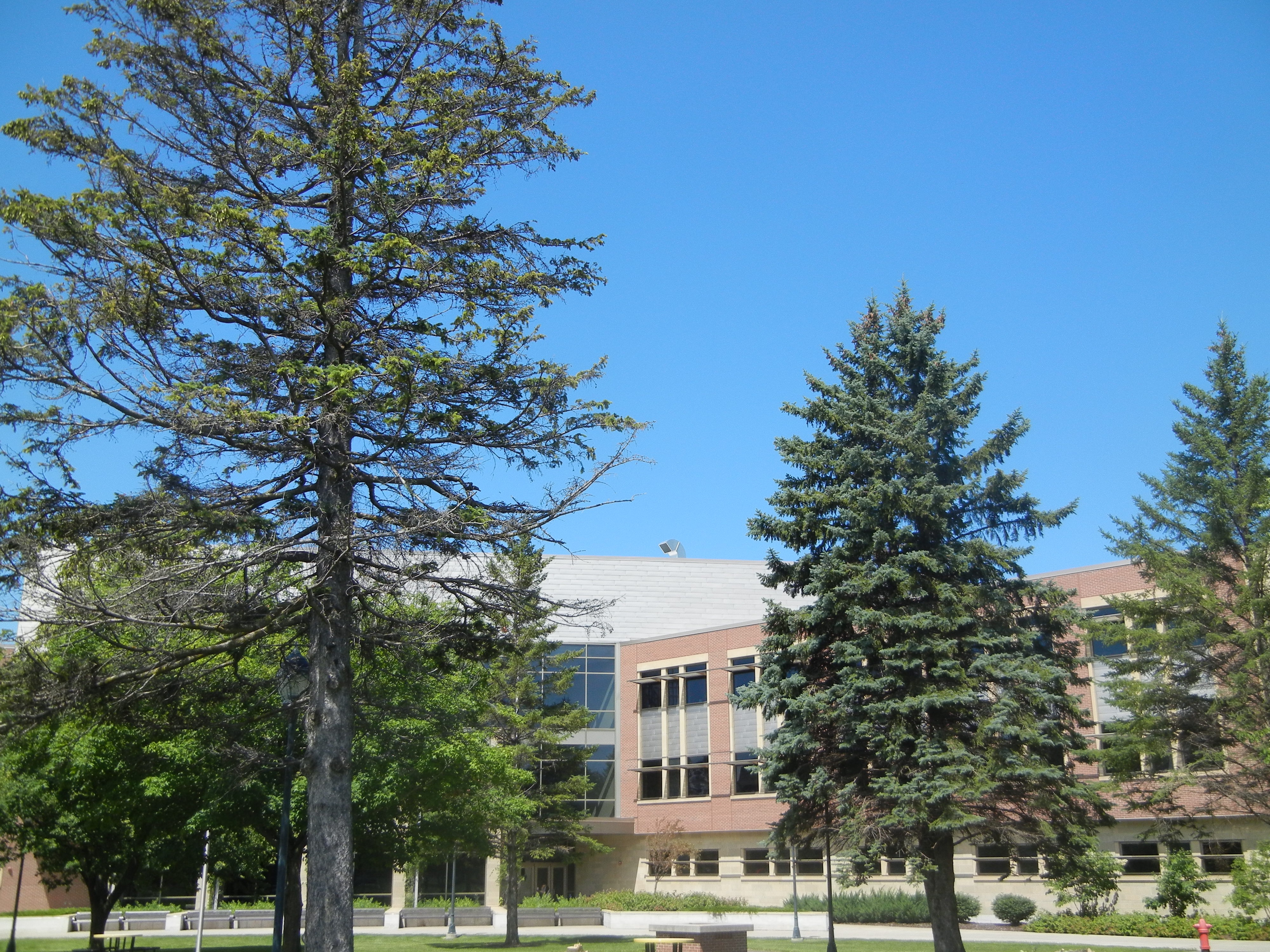
Swenson Hall

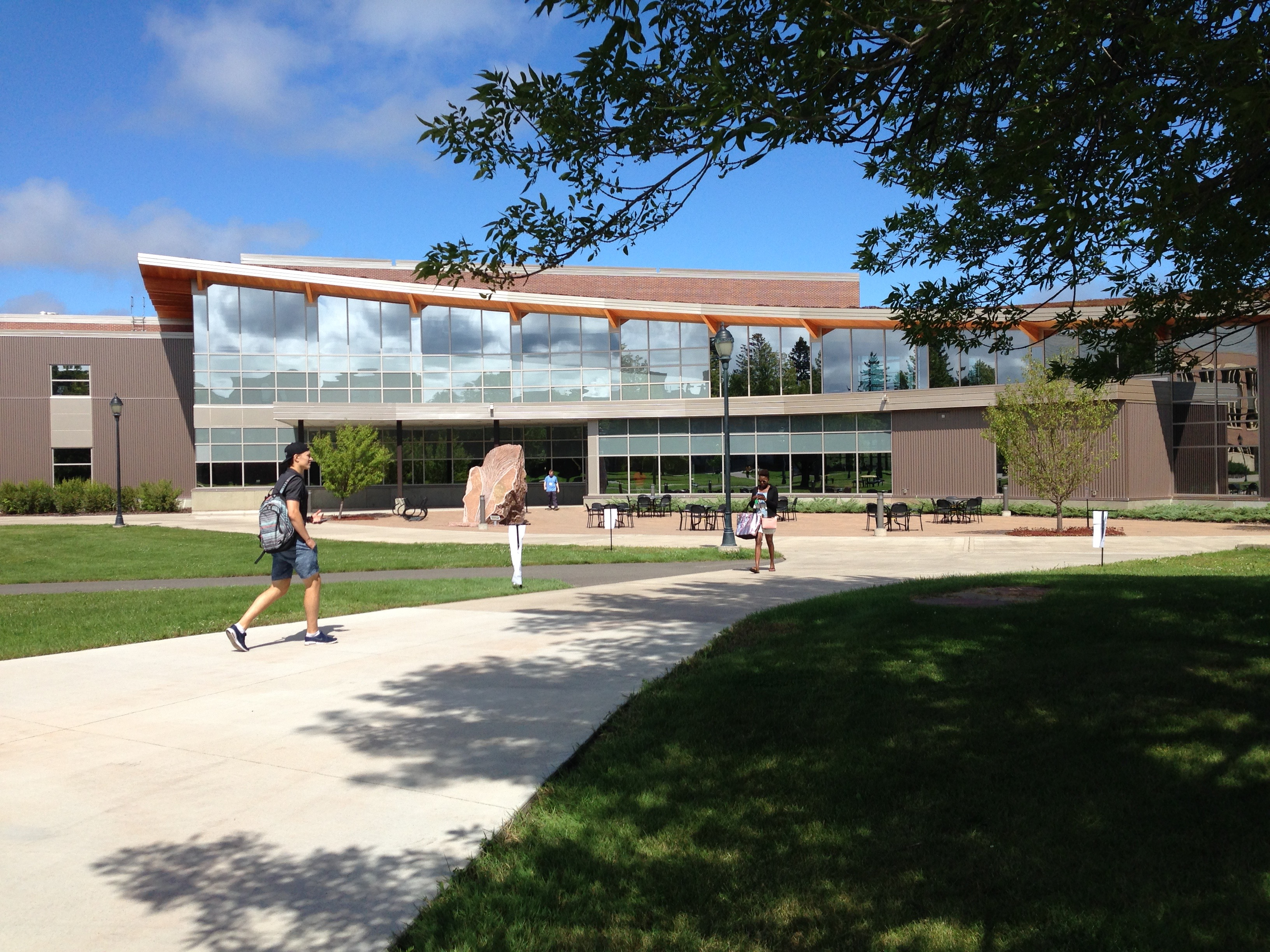
Yellowjacket Union

The university's main campus is at the corner of Belknap Street (U.S. Highway 2) and Catlin Avenue. Its north section is the site of all academic buildings and most residence halls. The south section, at the corner of North 28th Street and Catlin Avenue, contains Hawkes and Ross residence halls, Wessman Arena, and the University Services Center.

=== Academic buildings ===
- Barstow Hall, named for regent Barney Barstow: science programs, Lake Superior Research Institute
- Erlanson Hall, named for regent Clarence Erlanson: School of Business and Economics, Transportation and Logistics Research Center
- Gates Physical Education Building, named for regent Clough Gates: classrooms and labs, Mortorelli Gymnasium
- Holden Fine Arts Center, named for university benefactor Paul Holden: communicating arts, music, and visual arts programs, Wisconsin Public Radio studios, Manion Theatre, Webb Recital Hall
- Jim Dan Hill Library, named for the university's fifth president (1931–1964): University Library, Markwood Center for Learning, Innovation, and Collaboration, Area Research Center
- Marcovich Wellness Center, named for regent Toby Marcovich: athletics, health and human performance programs, recreation, Thering Field House
- Old Main, the oldest building on campus: Chancellor's Office, Provost's Office, Financial Aid Office, Center for Continuing Education, Bursar's (cashier's) Office, Center for Academic Advising, University Relations, Human Resources, Multicultural Center, Office of International Programs, Veteran & Non-Traditional Student Center, Thorpe Langley Auditorium
- Swenson Hall, named for university benefactors James and Susan Swenson: social sciences, education, languages, mathematics and computer science, Technology Services, First Nations Center, Student Support Services, Erlenbach Lecture Hall
- Wessman Arena, named for regent Siinto Wessman
- Yellowjacket Union: Admissions Office, Jacket Book and Supply, Union Cafe, Union Desk Information and Services, Rothwell Opportunity Center and student organization offices.

=== Residence halls ===
- Crownhart Hall, named for regent Charles Crownhart
- Curran Hall, named for regent Robert Curran
- McNeill Hall, named for first president Israel McNeill (1896–1907)
- Ostrander Hall, named for regent Frank Ostrander
- Ross Hall, named for regent Frank Ross (president, 1903)
- Hawkes Hall, named for regent Elizabeth Hawkes

=== Satellite locations ===
The university manages four external properties:

- Lake Superior National Estuarine Research Reserve, on Barker's Island in the Superior harbor, accessed from U.S. Highways 2/53
- Montreal Pier Testing Facility, also along the Superior waterfront, conducts invasive species research
- Nelson Outdoor Laboratory, 76 acres, on the Lake Superior shoreline within the city of Superior, at the end of Moccasin Mike Road
- Superior Small Business Development Center, in the Superior Entrepreneur Center at 1401 Tower Avenue, in partnership with the Wisconsin Small Business Development Center and other regional economic development organizations.

== Academics ==
UW–Superior has been designated as the public liberal arts college in the University of Wisconsin System, and is a member of the Council of Public Liberal Arts Colleges. The University of Wisconsin–Superior has been accredited by the Higher Learning Commission and its predecessor, the North Central Association of Colleges and Schools, since 1916. As of 2025, the school offers more than 50 undergraduate majors and concentrations from 11 academic departments. The student-faculty ratio is 14:1. The most popular majors at the university include: elementary education and teaching; business administration and management, psychology, exercise science and kinesiology; biology/biological sciences, communications; social work; and transportation/mobility management.

UW-Superior hosts four regional research centers and has two other research institute affiliations.

- Area Research Center, in Jim Dan Hill Library, collects public, historical, and genealogical records for Douglas and Washburn counties, in partnership with the Wisconsin Historical Society
- Lake Superior National Estuarine Research Reserve studies the estuarine environment of the St. Louis River and the south shore of Lake Superior, in partnership with University of Wisconsin-Madison Extension and NOAA
- Lake Superior Research Institute conducts original and applied research within the Lake Superior basin and beyond in Wisconsin
- Transportation and Logistics Research Center studies regional transportation issues

Affiliated research institutes:

- Great Lakes Maritime Research Institute is a shipping research consortium of UW-Superior and the University of Minnesota-Duluth
- Wisconsin Sea Grant Institute has its Lake Superior regional office at the Lake Superior National Estuarine Research Reserve

== Athletics ==
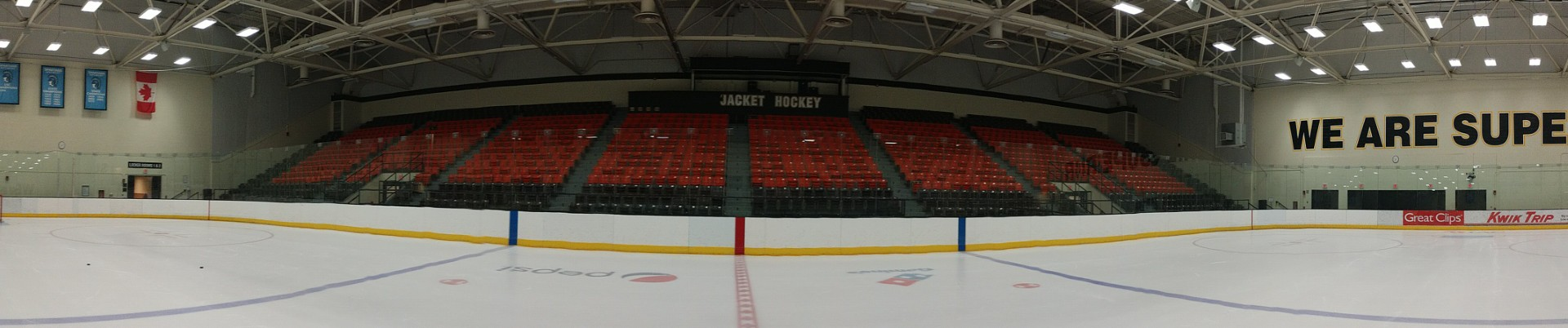
Inside Wessman Arena on the campus of the University of Wisconsin - Superior

UW–Superior's athletic teams, nicknamed the Yellowjackets, are affiliated with the NCAA's Division III class. Most teams compete in the Upper Midwest Athletic Conference (UMAC) and competed prior to 2015–2016 in the Wisconsin Intercollegiate Athletic Conference (WIAC). Men's and women's ice hockey teams continue to compete in the WIAC. The men's hockey team won the NAIA national championship in 1976 and the NCAA Division III national championship in 2002.

The university currently fields 17 varsity teams competing in the UMAC, they are baseball, basketball (men's/women's), cross country (m/w), golf (m/w), ice hockey (m/w), soccer (m/w), softball, tennis (m/w), track and field (m/w), and volleyball (w). Basketball, volleyball and track and field have their home events at The Marcovich Wellness Center. Other home games also played on campus include ice hockey played at Siinto S. Wessman Arena and Tennis matches at the Yellowjacket Tennis Complex. The NBC Spartan Sports Complex, opened in 2023, is home to all men's and women's soccer, baseball and softball games. The Golf and Cross Country programs host their events off campus at Nemadji Golf Course.

Apart from the varsity sports, Wisconsin–Superior also has ice hockey and soccer club sports.

== Media ==
KUWS, the university's radio station, broadcasts with 83,000 watts at 91.3 FM. KUWS is an affiliate of the Wisconsin Public Radio Music Network, and also originates its own jazz, alternative rock, and other music programming as well as UW-Superior sports broadcasts. The KUWS studios in the Holden Fine Arts Center also serve as the WPR Northern Bureau and provide programming to stations WHSA, WHWA, WSSU(FM), and WUWS.

The Promethean is the student newspaper for the University of Wisconsin–Superior. It began as The Peptomist, in 1920. Students voted to change the name to Promethean in 1974. The name was changed again at the start of the 2007–2008 academic year, to The Stinger. In fall 2009, it became primarily an online newspaper, publishing a print magazine compilation at the end of each term. In 2013, the newspaper returned to print, publishing bi-weekly. In 2015, the name returned to Promethean.

== Notable alumni ==
- Morrie Arnovich, MLB All Star outfielder
- Richard Bong (attended), World War II flying ace
- Frank Boyle, Wisconsin state legislator
- Esther Bubley, photojournalist
- Anthony Bukoski (graduate and later professor), short story writer
- Femi Pedro, Ambassador of the Federal Republic of Nigeria to Australia, New Zealand, Fiji, Solomon Islands and the Oceanic States
- Howard W. Cameron, Wisconsin state senator
- Herbert Clow, NFL player
- David DiFrancesco, co-founder of Pixar
- Bernard E. Gehrmann, Wisconsin state legislator
- Sandra A. Gregory, U.S. Air Force general
- Yadamini Gunawardena Member of Parliament, Parliament of Sri Lanka
- Mary Hubler, Wisconsin state legislator
- Oluf (Ole) Haugsrud (attended), owner of the Duluth Eskimos and a founding owner of the Minnesota Vikings
- Steven L. Johnson, President and CEO of Sinclair College, Dayton, Ohio
- Joe Kelly, co-founder of Dads and Daughters
- Ernest J. Korpela, educator and Wisconsin state legislator
- Gordon MacQuarrie, outdoor writer
- Thomas W. MacQuarrie, president of San Jose State College from 1927 to 1952
- Dom Moselle, NFL player
- Tom Murphy, NFL player
- Thomas B. Murray, Wisconsin state legislator
- Scott O'Brien, NFL assistant coach
- Wally O'Neill, NFL player
- Reino A. Perala (attended), Wisconsin state legislator
- Angus B. Rothwell, Superintendent of Public Instruction of Wisconsin
- Fritz Scholder (attended), Native American artist
- Arnold Schwarzenegger, 38th Governor of the state of California, bodybuilder and actor
- Patricia Spafford Smith (attended), small business owner and Wisconsin state legislator
- Stephen J. Smith, small business owner and Wisconsin state legislator, son of Patricia
- Doug Sutherland, former NFL player with the Minnesota Vikings

== Notable faculty and staff ==
- Scott O'Brien, NFL assistant coach
- Barton Sutter, poet and essayist
- Irl Tubbs, head coach of the Miami Hurricanes and the Iowa Hawkeyes football teams
- Albert D. Whealdon, chemistry professor and Wisconsin State Representative
