= WHLA (FM) =

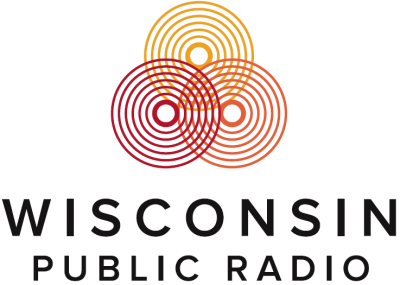
- La Crosse, Wisconsin; United States
- Broadcast area: La Crosse-Eau Claire
- Frequency: 90.3 MHz
- Branding: WPR News

Programming
- Language: English
- Format: Public radio; news
- Network: Wisconsin Public Radio
- Affiliations: NPR; American Public Media

Ownership
- Owner: Wisconsin Educational Communications Board; (Wisconsin Educational Communications Board)
- Sister stations: WLSU

History
- First air date: 1951
- Call sign meaning: WHA, La Crosse

Technical information
- Licensing authority: FCC
- Facility ID: 63055
- Class: C
- ERP: 100,000 watts
- HAAT: 307 m (1,007 ft)

Links
- Public license information: Public file; LMS
- Webcast: Listen live
- Website: www.wpr.org

WHLA (90.3 MHz) is an FM radio station licensed to La Crosse, Wisconsin, United States, serving the Eau Claire area. The station is part of Wisconsin Public Radio (WPR), and airs WPR's News Network, consisting of news and talk programming. WHLA also broadcasts regional news and programming from studios in the Whitney Center at the University of Wisconsin-La Crosse. WHLA ceased broadcasting in HD Radio on May 20, 2024.

== See also ==
- Wisconsin Public Radio
