= WHWA =

- Washburn, Wisconsin; United States
- Broadcast area: Bayfield/Ashland/Washburn
- Frequency: 104.7 MHz
- Branding: Wisconsin Public Radio

Programming
- Format: Public radio, Classical music, news

Ownership
- Owner: Wisconsin Educational Communications Board

History
- First air date: November 11, 2013; 12 years ago
- Call sign meaning: Disambiguation of WHA, Washburn

Technical information
- Licensing authority: FCC
- Facility ID: 184111
- Class: C2
- ERP: 17,500 watts
- HAAT: 184 meters
- Transmitter coordinates: 46.69166667°N 90.99083333°W

Links
- Public license information: Public file; LMS
- Webcast: Listen Live
- Website: wpr.org

WHWA (104.7 FM) is a public radio station in Washburn, Wisconsin, licensed to the Wisconsin Educational Communications Board. The station is part of Wisconsin Public Radio (WPR), and airs WPR's "NPR News and Classical Network", consisting of classical music and news and talk programming. WHWA also broadcasts regional news and programming from studios in the Holden Fine Arts Center at the University of Wisconsin-Superior. The WHWA transmitter is on Maple Hill, approximately four miles west of Washburn, co-located with WEGZ. The WHWA transmitter replaced a 38-Watt WPR translator (W284AN/104.7) in Ashland as part of an effort to improve public radio reception in the area.
