= To the Best of Our Knowledge =

To The Best Of Our Knowledge
- Other names: TTBOOK
- Genre: Interview
- Running time: 60 minutes (two episodes per week)
- Country of origin: United States
- Language: English
- Home station: Wisconsin Public Radio
- Hosted by: Jim Fleming, Anne Strainchamps
- Executive producer: Steve Paulson
- Original release: September 3, 1990 – September 27, 2025
- Website: ttbook.org
- Podcast: feeds.ttbook.org/ttbook

To the Best of Our Knowledge (also known by the acronym TTBOOK) was a weekly public-radio interview program produced by Wisconsin Public Radio and distributed by PRX. It was broadcast on more than 180 public radio stations in the U.S. and was also available as a podcast. Until his retirement in January 2014, Jim Fleming hosted the program, along with interviewers Steve Paulson and Anne Strainchamps. After Fleming's retirement, Strainchamps took over as host. The program's final episode aired September 27, 2025.

== Program format ==
To the Best of Our Knowledge produced two one-hour programs each week. Each hour had a theme that was explored over the course of the hour, primarily through interviews, although the show also aired commentaries, performance pieces, and occasional reporter pieces. Topics varied widely, from contemporary politics, science, and "big ideas" to pop culture themes such as "Nerds" or "Apocalyptic Fiction".

The program produced at least one five-part series every year that tended to be distributed more widely than the weekly broadcast. "East Meets West", a series on East-West cultural crossroads, included interviews with cellist Yo-Yo Ma, Muslim philosopher Tariq Ramadan, Muslim rapper Lupe Fiasco, Indian filmmaker Mira Nair, and Pakistani rock icon Salman Ahmad. "Electrons to Enlightenment", a five-part series on science and religion, included interviews with intellectual heavyweights E. O. Wilson, Richard Dawkins, Francis Collins, and Karen Armstrong.

To the Best of Our Knowledge won the 2004 Peabody Award for Programming.
