= WRFW =

Coordinates: 44.886°N 92.656°W

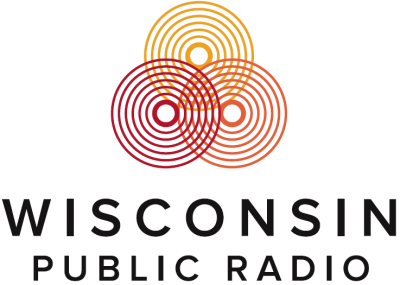
- River Falls, Wisconsin; United States
- Broadcast area: Minneapolis-St. Paul metropolitan area
- Frequency: 88.7 MHz

Programming
- Format: Public radio, News, College/Unformatted
- Affiliations: Wisconsin Public Radio, NPR, American Public Media

Ownership
- Owner: Board of Regents, University of Wisconsin System

History
- First air date: November 1, 1968
- Call sign meaning: River Falls, Wisconsin

Technical information
- Licensing authority: FCC
- Facility ID: 6091
- Class: A
- ERP: 3,000 watts
- HAAT: 25 meters (82 ft)

Links
- Public license information: Public file; LMS
- Webcast: Listen Live
- Website: wrfw887.com

WRFW (88.7 FM) is a Class A radio station licensed to the UW System Board of Regents and operates in River Falls, Wisconsin, United States, the station serves the Minneapolis-St. Paul metropolitan area. WRFW is an affiliate of Wisconsin Public Radio (WPR), and airs news and talk programming from WPR's "Ideas Network". The station also broadcasts local news, sports information, and entertainment programming. The broadcast studios are located in North Hall on the University of Wisconsin-River Falls campus.

During the school year, they will air content from 6 PM to 2 AM on weekdays and from 5 PM to 2 AM on weekends. Content is from DJ's that are either students, staff or faculty. There will also be live sports broadcasts from all University of Wisconsin-River Falls sporting events and select local high school sports.

- See also Wisconsin Public Radio
