= WLSU =

Wisconsin Public Radio transmitter in La Crosse

Coordinates: 43.805°N 91.368°W

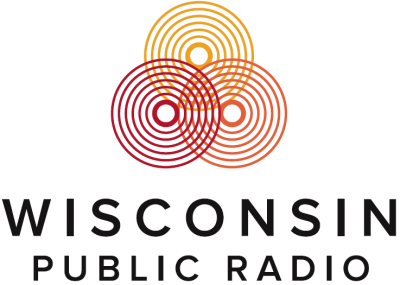
- La Crosse, Wisconsin; United States
- Broadcast area: La Crosse, Onalaska, Holmen, Sparta, Winona, MN; La Crescent, MN
- Frequency: 88.9 MHz
- Branding: WPR Music

Programming
- Format: Public radio, Classical music, News
- Affiliations: Wisconsin Public Radio; NPR; American Public Media

Ownership
- Owner: Board of Regents of the University of Wisconsin System; (Board of Regents of the University of Wisconsin System)
- Sister stations: WHLA (FM)

History
- First air date: April 4, 1971; 55 years ago
- Call sign meaning: W La Crosse State University

Technical information
- Licensing authority: FCC
- Facility ID: 4327
- Class: C2
- ERP: 8,200 watts
- HAAT: 283 m (928 ft)

Links
- Public license information: Public file; LMS
- Webcast: Listen Live
- Website: wpr.org

WLSU (88.9 FM) is a radio station licensed to La Crosse, Wisconsin. The station is part of Wisconsin Public Radio (WPR), and airs WPR's Music Network, consisting of classical music. WLSU also broadcasts local news and programming from studios in the Whitney Center at the University of Wisconsin-La Crosse.

The station first went on air in 1971; a year later, it joined Wisconsin Public Radio.

- See also Wisconsin Public Radio
