= WHDI (FM) =

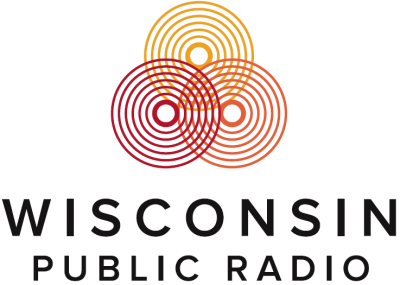
- Sister Bay, Wisconsin; United States
- Broadcast area: Door County
- Frequency: 91.9 MHz

Programming
- Format: Public radio, News
- Affiliations: Wisconsin Public Radio; NPR; American Public Media

Ownership
- Owner: State of Wisconsin - Educational Communications Board; (State of Wisconsin - Educational Communications Board)

History
- First air date: November 17, 1998
- Call sign meaning: Disambiguation from WHA, Door County Ideas Network

Technical information
- Licensing authority: FCC
- Facility ID: 83611
- Class: C3
- ERP: 3,400 watts
- HAAT: 145 meters (476 ft)

Links
- Public license information: Public file; LMS
- Webcast: Listen Live
- Website: wpr.org

WHDI (91.9 FM) is a radio station licensed to Sister Bay, Wisconsin, and serving the Door County area. The station is part of Wisconsin Public Radio (WPR), and airs WPR's "Ideas Network", consisting of news and talk programming.

The WHDI signal also makes it across Green Bay and into areas of Northeast Wisconsin that may be out of clear range of WHID and into south central portions of the Upper Peninsula of Michigan providing an alternative to Marquette, MI based WNMU, specifically in the Escanaba, MI area.

- See also Wisconsin Public Radio
