= Chapter a Day =

American public radio daily weekday program

Chapter a Day is the title of a daily weekday radio program airing on the American statewide public radio network, Wisconsin Public Radio as part of their Ideas Network service. A lunchtime tradition for years, the program features the reading of works of fiction, history and biography virtually in their entirety, by a professional radio performer in half-hour increments.

== History ==
According to WPR, the program has been airing since 1931. However, a popular legend is told by Jim Fleming, a Chapter a Day performer for the last twenty years and a Wisconsin Public Radio employee since the 1970s. Jim tells the story that sometime in the late 1920s Harold McCarty, the man who was most responsible for the creation of what has become Wisconsin Public Radio, was in the studio waiting for a guest who didn't show up. McCarty was left with the prospect of dead air – something no broadcaster can countenance. He pulled the book he was currently reading out of his briefcase, opened it up and began to read out loud into the microphone. McCarty's reading was so popular, and drew so many responses of "what came next?" that it has been on the air ever since. Fleming says this story is true in spirit if not provable in fact. After all, Chapter a Day is all about storytelling, and this is a really good story.

Actual records show that in the late 1920s there were sometimes Friday broadcasts that featured readings from classical literature by both University of Wisconsin–Madison professors and students. The earliest documentation of the Chapter a Day title referring to the narration of an entire book is found for July 25, 1932, and lists the name of Marianne Smith, a member of the University of Wisconsin class of 1932, leading to the assumption that she was the reader. It is thought that she read the book David's Day by Denis Mackail.

Chapter a Day appeared on the WHA (call letters for Wisconsin Public Radio) schedule intermittently from 1932 to 1939, often as part of the summer programming schedule, but became a year-round permanent feature of the radio station on April 3, 1939. A list of books read on the program dating back to 1939 does exist, meaning that Chapter a Day may well qualify as the longest running regularly scheduled radio program in the history of radio in the United States.

Until the 1970s, books read on Chapter a Day were read live on the air by the narrators. The standard reading of a book was ten episodes so that each book aired for two weeks. Chapter a Day originally aired at 3 pm, but has been broadcast primarily at midday for most of its long lifetime for the convenience and enjoyment of lunchtime listeners.

=== Performer history ===
Although not the earliest reader on Chapter a Day, Karl Schmidt was recruited by Harold McCarty and began reading for the program in 1941, when he was a student at the University of Wisconsin. Karl continued to read for the program until his death in 2016 at the age of 93, making him the longest serving reader of the program. Other readers over the years include Helen Darrah, Juanita Bauer, Marvin Bauer, Catherine Brand, Esther Hotton, Gerald Bartell, Sherwin "Sherry" Abrams, Ray Stanley, Tom Detienne, Myron Curry, Ken Ohst, radio actress Jay Meredith Fitts, Fannie Frazier Hicklin, Sybil Robinson, Ed Burrows, Kerry Frumkin, Jim Fleming, Judith Strasser, Norman Gilliland, Carol Cowan, Susan Sweeney, Michele Good, Michael Hanson, and Cliff Roberts.

== Current status ==
Chapter a Day is aired Monday through Friday at 7:00 pm CT and repeated at 9:30 pm CT on the Ideas Network stations of Wisconsin Public Radio and through the network's webstream. Several weeks of content are available for on-demand listening or download on the program's website. Currently books are read by Michele Good, Jim Fleming, Norman Gilliland, Susan Sweeney and others.

== Performance preparation ==
Narrators for Chapter a Day must possess certain skills and even training to perform this job effectively because while reading on the radio one can't use gestures to help tell the story. The characters of each book must be defined by means of tempo, pace, pitch and accents, using only the reader's voice. To prepare for a book reading on Chapter a Day a performer reads the book at least three times. The first time is to make sure it is conducive to being read on the air. The second time is to cut the book into half-hour increments and the third time is for broadcast. Often the performers will read the book a fourth time just before taping for broadcast, making sure that all the words and characters are understood.

== Book selections ==
Book selections for Chapter a Day are made primarily by the radio station narrators and are typically approved by the Executive Producer, who rarely turns one down. Since 1977 permission must be granted for the public broadcast of a book by whoever owns the rights to the book. This means that not every book selected to be read actually goes on the air. Some works are edited for content and profanity with the author's permission to meet FCC decency guidelines. Since it is only possible to read eleven or twelve pages in a half hour time period, many books are simply too long, and others are edited so that they can be read in three or four weeks. There is a special effort to include books written by local Wisconsin authors. Another consideration in selecting books for the program is the number of characters involved in the story. Because many listeners don't listen every day they can become lost if the cast of characters is too large. But the primary consideration in book selection is that the story has a compelling narrative that will entertain the listener.

== Popularity ==
Numerous area libraries and book stores report that when a book is read on Chapter a Day requests for that book increase. Many libraries and stores now request prior knowledge of a book's reading in order to have a greater number of copies available. The popularity of Chapter a Day is consistently high and there have been many years when Chapter a Day has been the most listened to program on the Ideas Network. As Fleming said, "There is something very basic and comforting about being read to that brings back an element of childhood and sitting on your grandfather's lap."
