= WUWS =

- Ashland, Wisconsin; United States
- Broadcast area: Bayfield/Ashland/Washburn
- Frequency: 90.9 MHz
- Branding: Wisconsin Public Radio

Programming
- Format: Public radio, News, Talk

Ownership
- Owner: University of Wisconsin System

History
- First air date: September 12, 2011; 15 years ago
- Call sign meaning: University of Wisconsin-Superior

Technical information
- Licensing authority: FCC
- Facility ID: 176548
- Class: C3
- ERP: 24,500 watts
- HAAT: 70.5 meters
- Transmitter coordinates: 46.607778°N 90.836944°W

Links
- Public license information: Public file; LMS
- Webcast: Listen Live
- Website: wpr.org

WUWS (90.9 FM) is a public radio station in Ashland, Wisconsin, licensed to the Board of Regents of the University of Wisconsin System. The station is part of Wisconsin Public Radio (WPR), and airs WPR's Music Network. WUWS also broadcasts regional news and programming from studios in the Holden Fine Arts Center at the University of Wisconsin-Superior. The WUWS transmitter is in the Ashland industrial park on the city's east side.
