= WEPS =

High school radio station in Elgin, Illinois

- Elgin, Illinois; United States
- Frequency: 88.9 MHz
- Branding: WPR Music

Programming
- Format: Classical music; High school
- Affiliations: Wisconsin Public Radio, National Public Radio, Classical 24

Ownership
- Owner: Elgin Area School District U46; (Board of Education School District U-46)

History
- First air date: January 13, 1950
- Call sign meaning: Elgin Public Schools

Technical information
- Licensing authority: FCC
- Facility ID: 4266
- Class: A
- ERP: 740 watts
- HAAT: 13 meters (43 ft)
- Transmitter coordinates: 42°02′17″N 88°16′15″W

Links
- Public license information: Public file; LMS
- Webcast: WPR Music
- Website: WEPS Online

WEPS (88.9 FM) is a radio station licensed to serve Elgin, Illinois, United States. The station is owned by the Elgin Area School District U46 and licensed to Board of Education School District U-46. Founded in 1950, WEPS is the oldest non-commercial educational radio station in the state of Illinois.

WEPS broadcasts a classical music format as a member of Wisconsin Public Radio's WPR Music network. WPR Music primarily broadcasts classical music with programs broadcasting jazz, world, and folk music on the weekends. WEPS broadcasts student/district programming aside WPR Music. Student/district programming broadcasts weekdays on 7 AM/PM, 4PM and 8 AM/PM on Fridays. Student/district programming usually contains student hosted shows with music, discussions and interviews in English and Spanish. Orchestra concert performances also broadcast on the programming block. District/student programming is usually prerecorded.

== History ==
Originally licensed in 1950 to broadcast at 88.1 MHz, WEPS originally broadcast instructional programs to the Elgin Public Schools, local high school sporting events, and was partially staffed by students to give them experience in high school radio station operation. The effort to bring WEPS on the air was led by Ernest C. Waggoner, director of audio-visual education for the school district. The station originally had an ERP of 10 watts. In 1960, the station's frequency was changed to 90.9 MHz, and its ERP was increased to 380 watts. In 1977, the station began sharing time on the frequency with WDCB.

WEPS moved to its current 88.9 MHz frequency in 1987, after reaching an agreement with WDCB, which allowed WDCB to begin full-time operations. The station became an affiliate of Wisconsin Public Radio's Ideas Network on September 28, 2005. During the COVID-19 pandemic throughout 2020 and early 2021, it was effectively a full-time feed of the network due to the closure of U-46 facilities. In 2024. U-46 resumed programming on the station. On May 20, 2024, the station was shifted to the new WPR Music network, specializing in classical, jazz, world, and folk music. In the 2025 season the station began broadcasting middle school and elementary school programming
