= Wisconsin Public Radio =

US state radio network

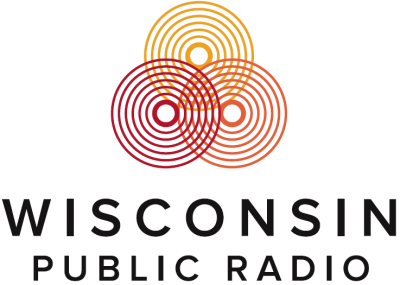
- Type: Public radio network
- Country: United States
- Broadcast area: Wisconsin, eastern Minnesota, northeastern Iowa, northern Illinois, Chicagoland, southern Upper Peninsula
- Headquarters: Madison, Wisconsin

Programming
- Affiliations: National Public Radio, American Public Media

Ownership
- Owner: Wisconsin Educational Communications Board & University of Wisconsin System, Board of Regents
- Sister stations: PBS Wisconsin

History
- Launch date: 1948

Links
- Webcast: WPR News; WPR Music
- Website: wpr.org Listener Organization wpra.org

Wisconsin Public Radio (WPR) is a network of 38 public radio stations in the state of Wisconsin. WPR's network is divided into two distinct services, the WPR News Network and the WPR Music Network.

== History ==
Wisconsin Public Radio has origins that date to 1914. For history prior to the formation of Wisconsin Public Radio, see WHA (AM).

The first real steps toward the building of what would become Wisconsin Public Radio began in 1947, with the sign-on of WHA-FM (now WERN) as a sister station to WHA. Between 1948 and 1965, seven more FM stations signed on as part of what was initially dubbed Wisconsin Educational Radio. The network became Wisconsin Public Radio in 1971, when it became a charter member of National Public Radio. Shortly afterward, the merger of the University of Wisconsin and Wisconsin State University systems into the present-day University of Wisconsin System greatly increased WPR's reach.

== WPR News ==
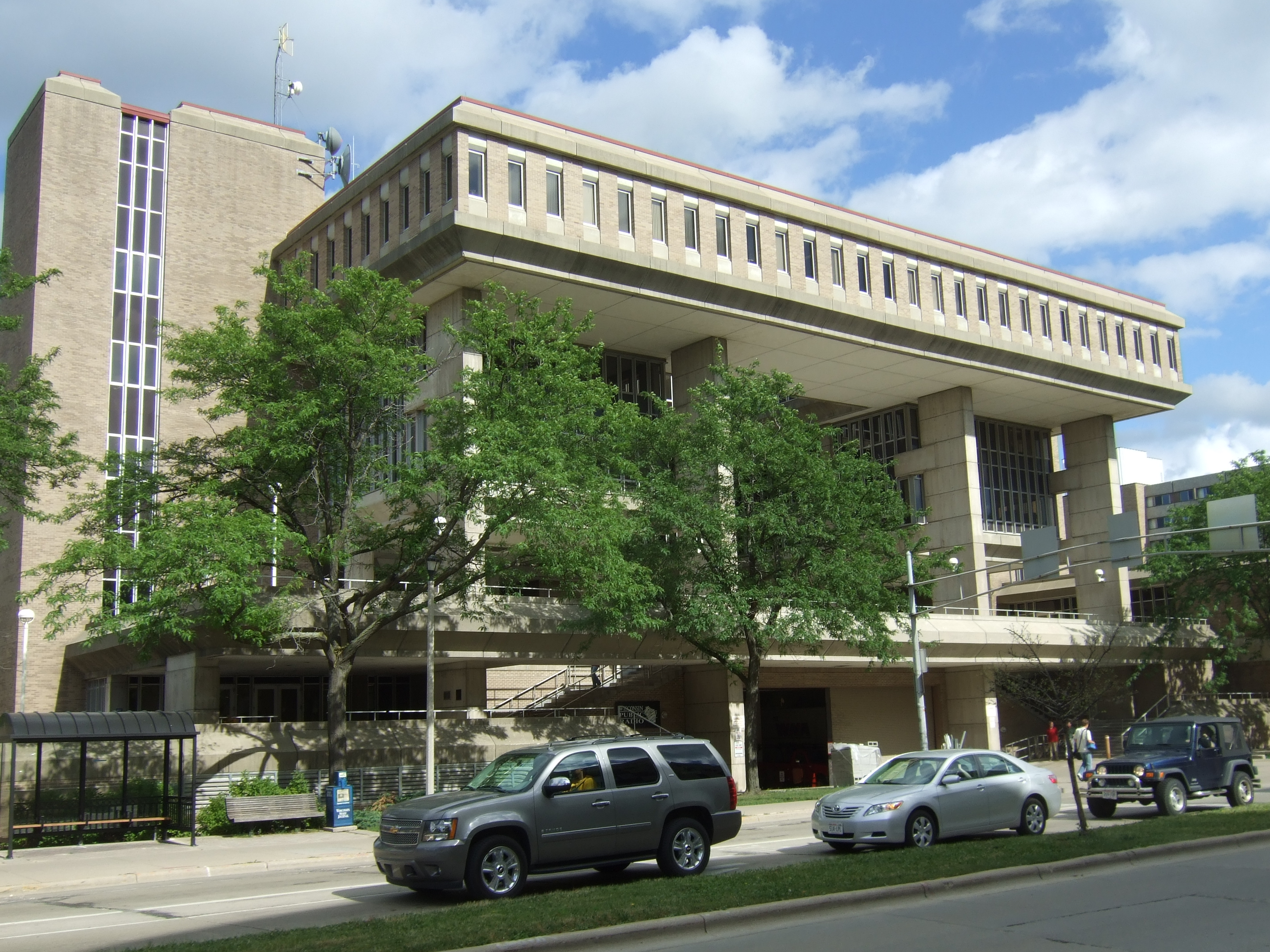
WPR's production, recording, and broadcast base, located within Vilas Hall on the UW–Madison campus.

WPR News is devoted mostly to NPR syndicated programming and WPR produced media. During the week, the WPR News airs Morning Edition, All Things Considered, On Point, 1A, Science Friday, along with a mix of national programs including Reveal, Latino USA and The Moth Radio Hour, and overnight, the BBC World Service.

In election years, expanded political coverage occurs, along with WPR often coordinating in part political debates for the state's highest offices such as Governor and Attorney General, often with PBS Wisconsin (formerly Wisconsin Public Television).

On the weekend, it airs WPR-produced shows, such as Zorba Paster On Your Health and To the Best of Our Knowledge. Weekends also include NPR/PRI/APM entertainment programming such as Wait Wait... Don't Tell Me!, Ask Me Another, Radiolab and Live from Here (the former A Prairie Home Companion) on Saturdays, with Says You!, A Way with Words, Milk Street Radio, Bullseye with Jesse Thorn, and This American Life on Sundays. Other WPR-originated programming on the weekends include: University of the Air, the folk music focused Simply Folk, and PRX Remix. On June 23, 2025, WPR announced it would end Zorba Paster On Your Health, BETA, University of the Air, and To the Best of Our Knowledge'. University of the Air began as Wisconsin School of the Air in 1931 and changed to its current name in 1978.

The flagship station of the WPR News is WHA 970 AM in Madison, one of the oldest existing radio stations in the world, and WERN 88.7 FM in Madison. Most WPR News stations broadcast in analog monaural sound to provide those signals the largest coverage areas possible, while the HD Radio and Internet streaming feeds broadcast in stereo.

Prior to 2024, the network hosted two call in shows during the morning and evening drive times, The Morning Show and Central Time. Personalities hosting call-in talk shows on the Ideas Network (as of November 2017) included Kate Archer Kent (early morning weekdays), and Central Time with Rob Ferrett and various co-hosts (afternoon drive time). On the typical weekday, the Ideas Network broadcast over seven hours of live, Wisconsin-produced call-in talk shows. This was reduced in 2024 when the network restructured.

The network carried old time radio programming on weekend evenings, but discontinued doing so in June 2020 due to the racial and sexist views of the era proving outdated and offensive to general audiences.

== WPR Music ==
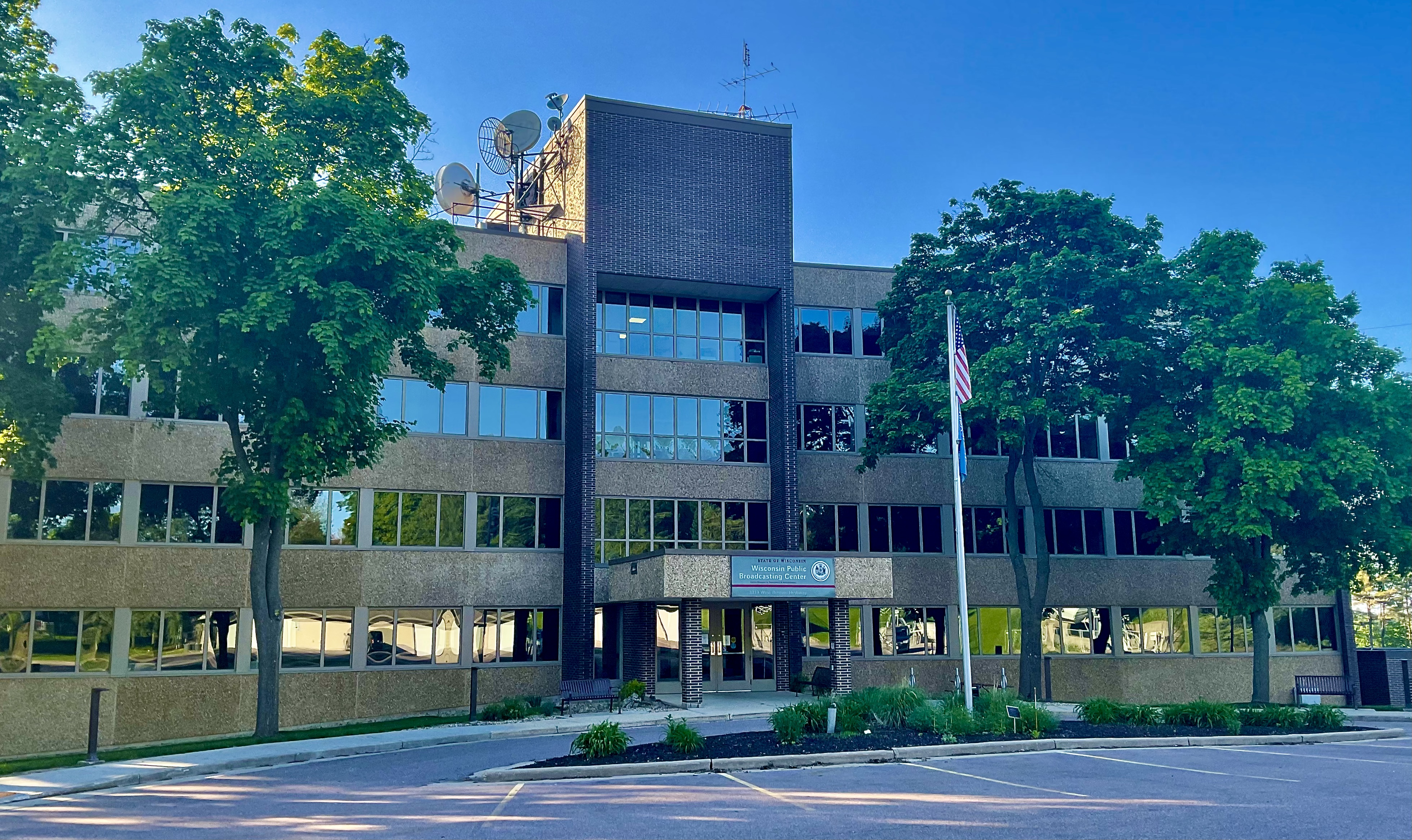
The Wisconsin Educational Communications Board/Public Broadcasting facility along the Madison Beltline, where PBS Wisconsin and Wisconsin Public Radio's administration are headquartered and both networks' master control is based from.

The WPR Music network broadcasts locally produced and syndicated classical music program 24 hours a day. Local programs include Morning Classics with Stephanie Elkins, Midday Classics with Norman Gilliland, Afternoon Classics with Jason Heilman, Drivetime Classics with Jason Heilman, Classics by Request with Ruthanne Bessman, BETA, The Road to Higher Ground with Jonathan Overby, Wisconsin Classical with Lori Skelton, Simply Folk with Sile Shigley, The Milwaukee Symphony Orchestra Broadcast Network, and Chapter A Day. Syndicated programming mostly includes content from Classical 24. Metropolitan Opera radio broadcasts air during the opera season. Syndicated Jazz music is heard on Friday and Saturday nights.

Prior to 2024, NPR News & Music Network, formerly the NPR News & Classical Network, was originally devoted to classical music, along with carrying the national NPR News programs Morning Edition and All Things Considered, though its news and talk programs increased since the early 2000s. It carried the syndicated Classical 24 network in non-prime hours, while daily classical programming originated from Madison. Higher Ground, a program of world music hosted by Dr. Jonathan Overby, was broadcast on Saturday night on WHAD, WPR's Ideas Network station in Milwaukee, to provide coverage outside of the New & Classical network.

In addition to the programs above, this network carried Fresh Air, Weekend Edition, American Public Media's Marketplace, the BBC World Service's Newshour, and Live from Here. Other forms of music such as blues, new-age, and Native American music can be heard regionally.

The NPR News & Music network did not have a presence in Milwaukee until 2024. Flagship NPR programming was aired on WUWM, which is independent from Wisconsin Public Radio. Programming from the NPR News & Music feed could be heard in Milwaukee on WHAD HD-2 from 9:00 a.m. to 3:00 p.m.. The network was partially available in western suburbs from WERN and in south shore suburbs from WGTD.

== Other digital services ==
Wisconsin Public Radio operates a mobile app on the Apple and Android platforms. The app includes in-app readers of local and national news articles from WPR and NPR. The app also includes streaming media players for both WPR News and WPR Music networks, along with full program guides to each service.

Wisconsin Public Radio produces several podcasts available on their mobile app, website, and many podcasting platforms.

A few stations broadcast on HD radio within the network. WERN airs WPR Music on the HD-2 channel, which is used to feed local analog translators on 90.5 and 107.9. WHAD airs WPR News on its HD-2 channel. WHRM airs the WPR Music on HD-2 to serve the Wausau area. WHHI airs WPR News on HD-2. Radio display information is limited to station identification only.

WPR affiliate station WGTD HD-2 offers a 24/7 jazz, big band and blues service, and WGTD HD-3 provides a reading service for the blind and visually impaired.

== Network stations ==
WPR's stations are licensed to several different organizations. Most stations are owned by either the University of Wisconsin System or by the Wisconsin Educational Communications Board, a state agency . The University of Wisconsin System and Wisconsin Educational Communications Board stations are administered by WHA Radio, a department of the University of Wisconsin – Madison, for the UW System Board of Regents. Other stations are affiliates, owned by local school districts or colleges.

The network's headquarters are located on the Madison campus where the majority of programs are produced. Some of WPR's regional studios produce local programming. Not all UW-owned stations are part of Wisconsin Public Radio's network; some are student-run, and others, like WUWM, are part of the UW-system, but not part of WPR. Two high school radio stations (one, WEPS, is located in the northwest Chicago suburb of Elgin, and its signal does not reach the Wisconsin state line) carry the network outside of school hours and summer periods, providing a form of license protection to those stations (WEPS began to program the Ideas Network in order to fend off a license challenge due to being off-air after school hours), while WLBL-FM in Wausau shares time on its frequency with WXPW, a repeater of independently owned NPR member WXPR in Rhinelander.

In April 2024, WPR announced a restructuring of its two analog networks, to take place on May 20 of that year. The Ideas Network was retired and its staff and most of its programming transferred to a new service called WPR News, while a new WPR Music service featured expanded schedules of classical music throughout the week, with jazz, world, and folk music heard on the weekends. Many WPR stations switched programming services; in Milwaukee, WHAD joined the WPR Music service (with NPR News programming continuing on WUWM) while WHA and WERN in Madison will join WPR News, with the low powered FM translators currently carrying the Ideas Network from WHA airing WPR Music going forward.

Most syndicated NPR programming continued on WPR News. However, 1A Plus, As It Happens, Q, and Milk Street Radio were removed from the network. WPR network programs The Morning Show and Central Time were replaced with a one-hour show called Wisconsin Today. WPR regional news programs Route 51, Simply Superior, and Newsmakers were replaced with regional news updates during Morning edition on their local network stations. Syndicated classical programming Exploring Music with Bill McGlaughlin and Classical 24 will be removed from the program schedule, while Chapter a Day will move to WPR Music.

At the time of the announcement, no information was provided by WPR on changes to the All Classical Network or any of its HD radio services. Later, it was announced that The All Classical Network and most HD radio services would cease at the time of transition. WPR noted on their website, "We are encouraging people to use online audio instead of HD because it is easier to find for most people"

Gateway Technical College's WGTD affiliate confirmed its general alignment to WPR News, but stated all local programming would be preserved with slight schedule adjustments. Their Radio Reading Service would be preserved as well. WGTD also announced plans to create a new HD3 station, which would simulcast programming from WPR Music.

Location	Frequency	Call sign	Before Restructure	After Restructure
Brule (Superior)	89.9 FM	WHSA	NPR News & Music	WPR News
Eau Claire	89.7 FM	WUEC	NPR News & Music	WPR Music
Elkhorn	101.7 FM	W269BV	NPR News & Music	WPR News
Green Bay	89.3 FM	WPNE	NPR News & Music	WPR News
Lake Geneva	103.3 FM	W277BM	NPR News & Music	WPR News
Kenosha	91.1 FM	WGTD	NPR News & Music	WPR News
La Crosse	88.9 FM	WLSU	NPR News & Music	WPR Music
Madison	88.7 FM	WERN	NPR News & Music	WPR News
Menomonie	90.7 FM	WVSS	NPR News & Music	WPR Music
Sister Bay	89.7 FM	WHND	NPR News & Music	WPR News
Superior	88.5 FM	WSSU	NPR News & Music	WPR News
Washburn	104.7 FM	WHWA	NPR News & Music	WPR Music
Wausau	90.9 FM	WHRM	NPR News & Music	WPR News
Ashland	90.9 FM	WUWS	NPR News & Music	WPR News
Adams	89.1 FM	WHAA	The Ideas Network	WPR Music
Delafield	90.7 FM	WHAD	The Ideas Network	WPR Music
Highland	91.3 FM	WHHI	The Ideas Network	WPR Music
Eau Claire	88.3 FM	WHWC	The Ideas Network	WPR News
Elgin, IL	88.9 FM	WEPS	The Ideas Network	WPR Music
Green Bay	88.1 FM	WHID	The Ideas Network	WPR Music
Janesville	100.3 FM	W262DD	The Ideas Network	WPR News
La Crosse	90.3 FM	WHLA	The Ideas Network	WPR News
Madison	970 AM	WHA	The Ideas Network	WPR News
Madison	107.9 FM	W300BM	The Ideas Network	WPR Music
Madison	90.5 FM	W213CE	The Ideas Network	WPR Music
Menomonie	88.3 FM	WHWC	The Ideas Network	WPR News
Oshkosh	90.3 FM	WRST-FM	The Ideas Network	WPR News
Park Falls	90.3 FM	WHBM	The Ideas Network	WPR News
Rhinelander	89.9 FM	WHSF	The Ideas Network	WPR Music
River Falls	88.7 FM	WRFW	The Ideas Network	WPR News
Sheboygan	91.7 FM	WSHS	The Ideas Network	WPR Music
Sister Bay	91.9 FM	WHDI	The Ideas Network	WPR Music
Stevens Point	930 AM	WLBL	The Ideas Network	WPR Music
Superior	91.3 FM	KUWS	The Ideas Network	WPR Music
Wausau	91.9 FM	WLBL-FM	The Ideas Network	WPR Music
Wausau	101.3 FM	W267BB	The Ideas Network	WPR Music
Marshfield	100.9 FM	W256DC	The Ideas Network	WPR Music
Stevens Point	99.1 FM	W256CZ	The Ideas Network	WPR Music

== The former All Classical Network ==
The All Classical Network service was available as an online stream and through HD Radio in select markets from 2007 to 2024. The All Classical Network exclusively featured classical music. The network included a simulcast of locally produced daytime classical programming, Exploring Music with Bill McGlaughlin, and syndicated Classical 24 programming. Stations with this HD-2 service included WERN Madison, WHAD Milwaukee, WHRM Wausau, WPNE Green Bay, WHHI Highland, and WHLA La Crosse. It was also available on analog translator W272CN 102.3FM in Ashland, rebroadcasting WHSA HD-2. W272CN, originally W275AF/102.9, was no longer needed after WPR constructed two full-power stations in the Chequamegon Bay area and was discontinued in June 2016 . On October 19, 2020, WPR discontinued HD service on KUWS Superior, WHSA Brule-Superior, WUWS Ashland, WHBM Park Falls, WHWC Menomonie, WHAA Wisconsin Rapids, and WHDI Sister Bay, due to low listenership.

The All Classical Network streamed real-time live over most Internet streaming venues, along with WPR's mobile app and website. Downloadable versions of WPR shows in MP3 were also available.

== Ethics and community guidelines ==
Wisconsin Public Radio states that it "is committed to the highest standards of journalistic ethics and excellence" on its website and that it ascribes to the RTDNA Code of Ethics and Professional Conduct.

Listeners and the broader public are invited to share their views of programs, topics and guests during radio broadcasts, on social media and wpr.org web forums and through WPR's Audience Services phone and email contacts. WPR posts guidelines for talk-show callers and online community members on its website. The guidelines are enforced through call-screeners during broadcast programs and online forums are regularly monitored by WPR staff.

== Wisconsin Public Radio shows with national distribution ==
=== Former ===
- Michael Feldman's Whad'Ya Know?
- To the Best of Our Knowledge
- Zorba Paster On Your Health

== See also ==
- National Public Radio
- PBS Wisconsin
- Public Radio International
- Wisconsin Educational Communications Board
- Wisconsin Idea
