= WSSU (FM) =

Coordinates: 46.789°N 92.113639°W

- Superior, Wisconsin; United States
- Broadcast area: Duluth/Superior
- Frequency: 88.5 MHz
- Branding: WPR News and Classical

Programming
- Format: Public radio, Classical music, News
- Affiliations: Wisconsin Public Radio; NPR; American Public Media

Ownership
- Owner: Wisconsin Educational Communications Board

History
- First air date: August 24, 2012
- Call sign meaning: WiSconsin-SUperior

Technical information
- Licensing authority: FCC
- Facility ID: 89432
- Class: A
- ERP: 950 watts
- HAAT: 100 meters (330 ft)
- Transmitter coordinates: 46° 47' 20.40" N 92° 06' 49.10" W

Links
- Public license information: Public file; LMS
- Webcast: Listen Live
- Website: wpr.org

WSSU (88.5 MHz) is an FM radio station licensed to Superior, Wisconsin, and serving the Duluth/Superior area. The station is part of Wisconsin Public Radio (WPR), and airs the WPR News network. WSSU also broadcasts local news and programming from studios in the Holden Fine and Applied Arts Center at the University of Wisconsin-Superior.

The WSSU call letters had originally been on sister Ideas Network station KUWS from its sign-on in 1966 until 1988. From 1989 to 1995, WSSU was used by a Springfield, IL public radio station which was formerly WSSR and later WUIS.

- See also Wisconsin Public Radio
