= WRST-FM =

Coordinates: 44.029°N 88.552°W

- Oshkosh, Wisconsin; United States
- Frequency: 90.3 MHz
- Branding: "90.3 WRST"

Programming
- Format: Alternative, News/Talk

Ownership
- Owner: UW Board of Regents

History
- First air date: April 20, 1966
- Call sign meaning: Wisconsin's Radio Station of the Titans

Technical information
- Licensing authority: FCC
- Facility ID: 4291
- Class: A
- ERP: 960 watts
- HAAT: 38 meters

Links
- Public license information: Public file; LMS
- Webcast: Listen Live
- Website: wrst.org

WRST-FM (90.3 MHz) licensed to Oshkosh, Wisconsin, is the student managed radio station located at the University of Wisconsin–Oshkosh.

== History ==
WRST started programming on April 20, 1966 at 6 pm. Originally located at 88.1FM with 10 watts of power, WRST was only on the air for four hours each weeknight. The first song played on WRST was The Mamas & the Papas "Monday, Monday". Doctor Robert "Doc" Snyder was hired by the University of Wisconsin–Oshkosh in 1964 to start a broadcast media program, and as part of his duties, he established a radio and TV station (Titan TV). In 1966, Frank G. Kilpatrick, formerly Vice President of KXRX in San Jose, moved from California to manage the UW-O station and teach radio broadcasting to students.

WRST's call letters stand for "Radio Station of the Titans". Originally the call letters were supposed to be WSUO "Wisconsin State University Oshkosh" to be consistent with other state university radio stations. However, those call letters were already taken; as such, WRST was chosen.

The Fuller Goodman Lumber Company served as the station's first studio, with an antenna located on the roof of the Gruenhagen Conference Center. In 1971, production and transmission were moved to the Arts and Communication Center, and in the fall of 1973, the signal frequency changed from 88.1 FM to 90.3 FM, with an increase in signal strength from 10 to 960 watts.

In 1992, Director of Radio Services Ben Jarman established an affiliation with the Wisconsin Public Radio Ideas Network. This was done to cover programming during the hours students are in class and over breaks from the academic year when staffing became a problem at WRST. The affiliation continues to this date.

At 2:08 pm on April 5, 2005, WRST began streaming locally produced programming online. The original stream and streaming server were set up by Joshua Werner.

== About WRST ==
WRST is part of the historic Radio TV Film program at UW Oshkosh. UW Oshkosh students are responsible for most aspects of WRST's management and fully staff the station. Professional oversight is provided by the General Manager and Chief Engineer, who offer legal and technical guidance to the students.

Programming from WRST is shared half time with Wisconsin Public Radio's "Ideas Network" which runs from 12 am – 1 pm daily. Student shows are on the air from 1 pm – 12 am and provide college alternative and jazz music, news and talk programming along with sports coverage of UW-Oshkosh Athletics.

Current WRST programming schedule (Fall Semester 2024)

Time (CST)	Monday	Tuesday	Wednesday	Thursday	Friday	Saturday/Sunday
1-2 PM	The Jazz Wire	The Jazz Wire (1:00-4:30)	The Jazz Wire	The Jazz Wire	The Jazz Wire	The Shuffle
2-3 PM	The Jazz Wire	The Jazz Wire (1:00-4:30)	The Jazz Wire	The Jazz Wire	The Jazz Wire	The Shuffle
3-4 PM	The Jazz Wire	The Jazz Wire (1:00-4:30)	The Jazz Wire	The Jazz Wire	The Jazz Wire	The Shuffle
4-5 PM	The Jazz Wire	The Jazz Wire (1:00-4:30)	The Jazz Wire	The Jazz Wire	The Jazz Wire	The Shuffle
5-6 PM	Sports Page	Unscripted (4:30-5:30)	Filmspotting	E Town	Week in Review (5:00-5:30) UWO Now (5:30-6:00)	The Shuffle
6-7 PM	Female Power Hour	The Shuffle (5:30-8:00)	Taycee's Going Away Party	The Shuffle	The Shuffle	The Shuffle
7-8 PM	Female Power Hour	The Shuffle (5:30-8:00)	Taycee's Going Away Party	The Shuffle	The Shuffle	The Shuffle
8-9 PM	The Shuffle	Radio KDB	The Shuffle	Polka Jamboree	The Shuffle	The Shuffle
9-10 PM	The Shuffle	Radio KDB	The Shuffle	Polka Jamboree	The Shuffle	The Shuffle
10-11 PM	The Shuffle	Tony's Treasure Trove	The Shuffle	The Shuffle	The Mosh Pit	The Shuffle
11 PM - 12 AM	The Shuffle	Tony's Treasure Trove	The Shuffle	The Shuffle	The Mosh Pit	The Shuffle

Since 1989, Sociology professor Dr. Gerry Grzyb, called "Dr. Christmas" on-the-air, has been hosting a yearly Christmas music program on WRST the week after the fall semester concludes in December. The "Dr. Christmas Show" is proclaimed the most diverse Christmas music program in America.
