= WLBL (AM) =

Coordinates: 44°36′48″N 90°02′14″W

- Auburndale, Wisconsin; United States
- Broadcast area: Stevens Point; Wisconsin Rapids; Marshfield, Wisconsin
- Frequency: 930 kHz

Programming
- Format: Classical
- Affiliations: Wisconsin Public Radio; NPR; American Public Media

Ownership
- Owner: Wisconsin Educational Communications Board

History
- First air date: February 5, 1923
- Former call signs: WPAH (1923–1924)
- Call sign meaning: "Wisconsin, Land of Beautiful Lakes" (Note: The station application requested "WLOL", for "Land of Lakes", but the U.S. Department of Commerce, which regulated radio at this time, required that call signs for new stations meet the current standard of being issued sequentially-assigned call letters that had "B" as the third letter, so "WLBL" was substituted and the station slogan modified accordingly.)

Technical information
- Licensing authority: FCC
- Facility ID: 63138
- Class: D
- Power: 5,000 watts day; 70 watts night
- Translators: 99.1 W256CZ (Stevens Point); 100.9 W265DC (Marshfield)

Links
- Public license information: Public file; LMS
- Webcast: Listen Live
- Website: Wisconsin Public Radio; WLBL Webpage

WLBL (930 kHz) is an AM radio station licensed to Auburndale, Wisconsin, serving Stevens Point and Wisconsin Rapids. The station is part of Wisconsin Public Radio (WPR), and airs "WPR Music", consisting of classical music programming.

WLBL is the second-oldest station in the Wisconsin Public Radio network. It traces its history to WPAH in Waupaca, which was licensed to the Wisconsin Department of Markets, and began broadcasting on February 5, 1923. The department later moved its operations to Stevens Point and changed the calls to WLBL in May 1924. In 1932, it began sharing programs with Madison's WHA—the ancestor of today's Wisconsin Public Radio network. Owned for many years by the state Commerce Department, it is now owned by the Wisconsin Educational Communications Board.

WLBL must power down to 70 watts at sunset, resulting in spotty coverage even in Wisconsin Rapids and missing Stevens Point altogether. During the fall, winter, early spring, and late summer, it is allowed to boost its power to 500 watts at 06:00, then go to full power at sunrise.
