= WHSA =

Coordinates: 46.4666°N 91.5665°W

- Brule, Wisconsin; United States
- Broadcast area: Duluth/Superior
- Frequency: 89.9 MHz
- Branding: WPR News and Classical

Programming
- Format: Public radio, Classical music, News
- Affiliations: Wisconsin Public Radio; NPR; American Public Media

Ownership
- Owner: State of Wisconsin - Educational Communications Board

History
- First air date: 1952
- Call sign meaning: W-Hayward, Superior, Ashland (major cities in station's coverage area)

Technical information
- Licensing authority: FCC
- Facility ID: 63089
- Class: C1
- ERP: 92,000 watts
- HAAT: 157 meters (515 ft)

Links
- Public license information: Public file; LMS
- Webcast: Listen Live
- Website: wpr.org

WHSA (89.9 FM) is an American radio station licensed to Brule, Wisconsin, and serving the Duluth/Superior area. The station is part of Wisconsin Public Radio (WPR), and airs WPR's "NPR News and Classical Network", consisting of classical music and news and talk programming. WHSA also broadcasts regional news and programming from studios in the Holden Fine Arts Center at the University of Wisconsin-Superior.

- See also Wisconsin Public Radio

== Translators ==
WHSA was relayed by an additional translator station W284AN. This has now been removed from the FCC FM Query.
