= PBS Wisconsin =

PBS member network in Wisconsin

- Type: Non-commercial educational broadcast television network
- Country: United States
- First air date: May 3, 1954
- Broadcast area: statewide Wisconsin; (except Milwaukee Metro); (additional coverage in portions of Eastern Minnesota and Iowa, Upper Peninsula of Michigan and Northern Illinois)
- Owner: WHA-TV: University of Wisconsin–Madison; Other stations: State of Wisconsin – Educational Communications Board
- Digital channel: see § Stations
- Sister stations: Wisconsin Public Radio
- Former callsigns: Wisconsin Educational Television Network (1972–1986); Wisconsin Public Television (1986–2019)
- Affiliations: PBS, APT
- Former affiliations: NET (1954–1970)
- Official website: pbswisconsin.org

PBS Wisconsin (formerly Wisconsin Public Television or WPT) is a network of non-commercial educational television stations operated primarily by the Wisconsin Educational Communications Board and the University of Wisconsin–Madison. It comprises all of the PBS member stations in the state outside of Milwaukee (which has its own PBS stations).

The state network is available via flagship station WHA-TV in Madison and five full-power satellite stations throughout most of Wisconsin. As of April 5, 2009, all stations have converted to digital-only transmissions. PBS Wisconsin is also available on most satellite and cable television outlets. WHA-TV, along with Chicago-based WTTW, serve the Rockford, Illinois, television market exclusively through cable and satellite, as Rockford is one of a few television markets in the United States that lacks a PBS station of its own.

Until the gradual move of instructional broadcasting to IPTV services, the network, as Wisconsin Public Television, was the main conduit of educational television, GED preparation and instructional television programming produced by the WECB, which aired through PBS, Annenberg Media, those stations serving portions of Wisconsin without a WPT station, and other educational television distributors. As of October 2014, the WECB now distributes this programming exclusively online, allowing the over-the-air network to carry PBS programming full-time.

== History ==
WHA-TV signed on the air on May 3, 1954, as the first educational station in Wisconsin and the seventh in the United States. WHA-TV is the only public television station in the country that maintains a three-letter callsign, and one of only three analog-era UHF stations altogether (along with WHP-TV in Harrisburg, Pennsylvania, and WWJ-TV in Detroit) with a three-letter callsign.

Wisconsin was a relative latecomer to educational television, despite its earlier leading role in educational radio. Channel 21's radio sister, WHA (AM), is one of the oldest educational radio stations in the world. By the time channel 21 signed on, UW had already launched a radio network that evolved into today's Wisconsin Public Radio. However, for most of the time from the 1950s through the 1970s, it was one of only three stations in the state that was a member of National Educational Television (NET) and its successor, PBS. The others were WMVS (channel 10) and WMVT (channel 36) in Milwaukee. The only other areas of the state outside of Milwaukee and Madison that had a clear signal from an NET/PBS member station were the northwest (from Duluth, Minnesota's WDSE-TV) and the west central (from the Twin Cities' KTCA-TV). During the late 60s and into the early 70s, commercial station KFIZ-TV in Fond du Lac was contracted by the UW-Madison Board of Regents to simulcast portions of WHA-TV's broadcast day, bringing WHA's programming into the Green Bay and Milwaukee markets.

Wisconsin Public Television's logo from 1992 to 2019.

In 1971, the state legislature created the Wisconsin Educational Communications Board, activating five stations as semi-satellites of WHA-TV during the 1970s; the network launched using new studio facilities located within Vilas Hall on the UW–Madison campus, along with WHA-TV and WHA radio. The first was WPNE-TV in Green Bay in 1972, ending KFIZ-TV's part-time affiliation with WHA (and hastening its demise only two months after WPNE went on the air). This was followed by WHWC-TV in Menomonie and WHLA-TV in La Crosse in 1973; WHRM-TV in Wausau in 1975 and WLEF in Park Falls in 1977, most taking call signs that originated from their co-owned radio counterparts. Originally, programming origination was split between WHA-TV and WPNE-TV. The stations adopted the on-air name of "Wisconsin Public Television" in 1986, and by then WHA-TV had become the sole originating station. Transmission and station identification is based out of ECB's Madison facility; all stations still maintain studios at their respective universities but have generally been deprecated with the evolution of public broadcasting and technology.

From 1960 to 2007, WHA-TV/WPT aired same-day tape-delayed coverage of some Wisconsin Badgers football and men's basketball home games, which was produced in association with UW-Madison's athletic department. This ended in 2007 with the Big Ten Conference's new media rights deals (including the new Big Ten Network cable channel). The state network offers tape-delayed broadcasts of Badgers men's and women's hockey, women's basketball and volleyball throughout the year over the secondary Wisconsin Channel.

In 2018, Wisconsin Public Television collaborated with the American Archive of Public Broadcasting to preserve digitized items in the WPT collection.

On November 4, 2019, Wisconsin Public Television was renamed PBS Wisconsin, aligning itself with the new national PBS brand identity unveiled the same day.

== Stations ==
=== Full-power stations ===
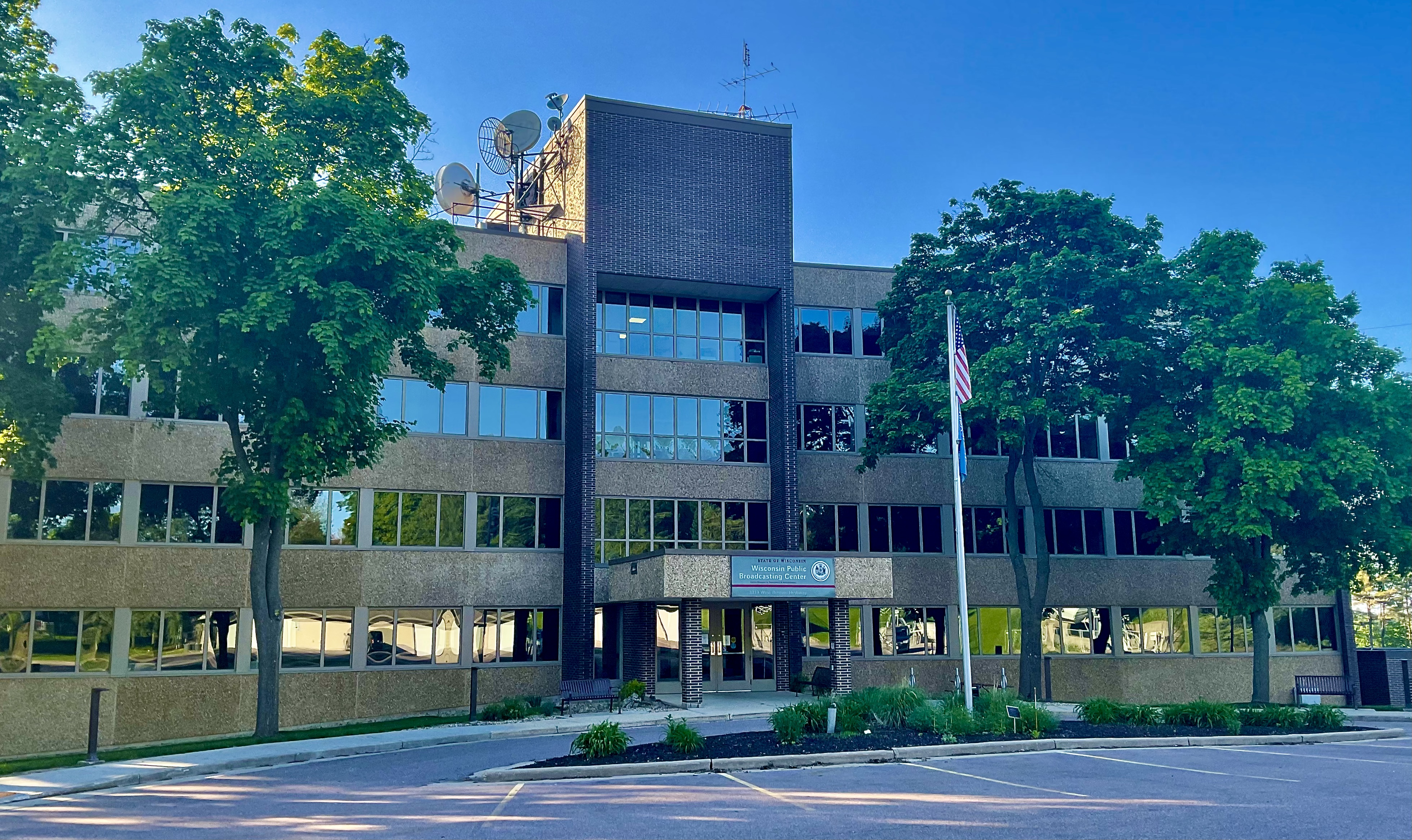
The Wisconsin Educational Communications Board/Public Broadcasting facility along the Madison Beltline, where PBS Wisconsin and Wisconsin Public Radio are also headquartered and master control is based from.

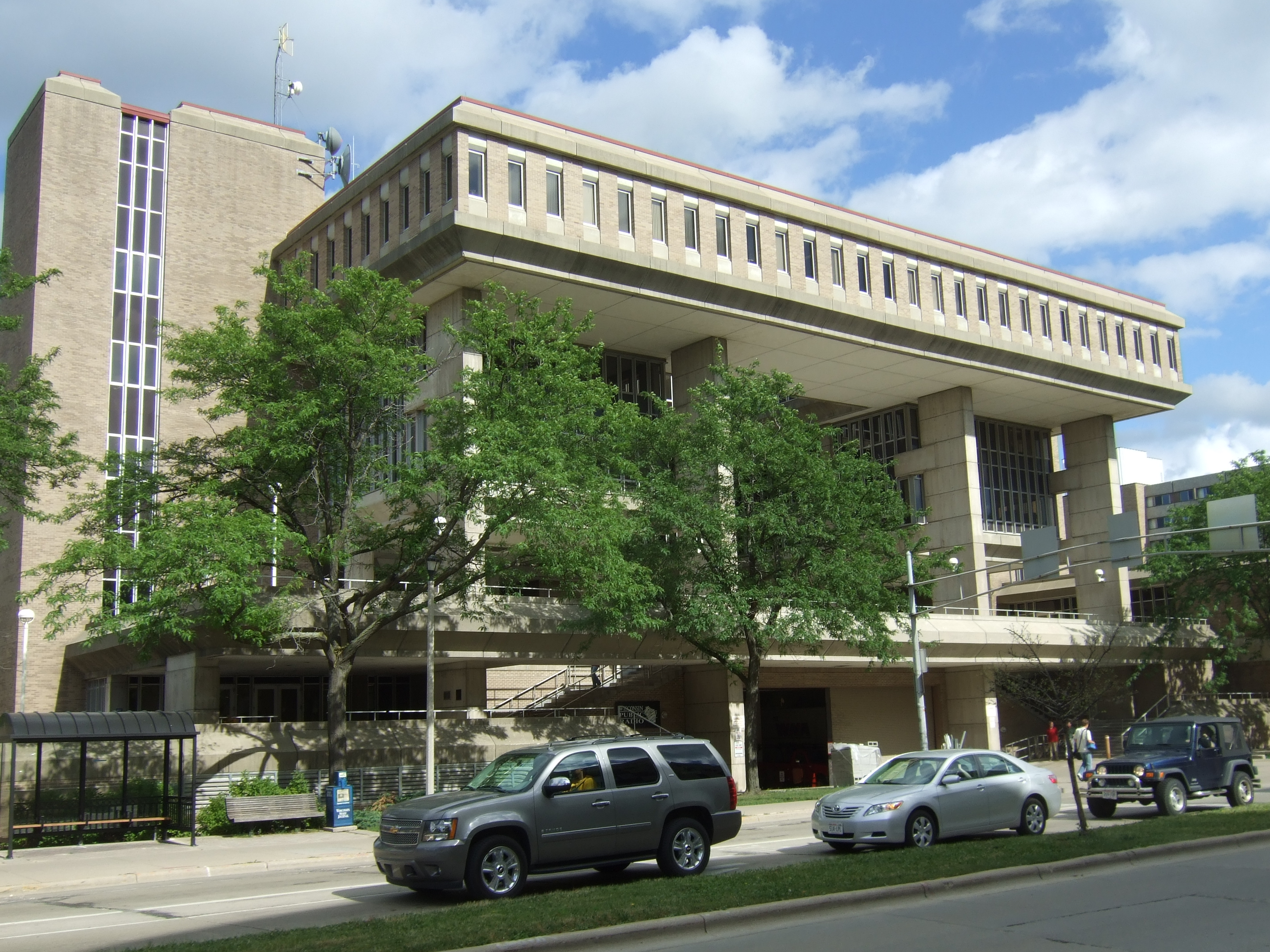
PBS Wisconsin's studio programming and production is based out of Vilas Hall on the UW–Madison campus.

There are six full-power stations in the state network, each located in major cities throughout the state, and all are broadcast on the UHF band. On April 5, 2009, the state network ended analog service for all stations, which map to their former analog channel location; WLEF's analog signal was terminated on February 3, 2009. All digital facilities and channels in the network except for WLEF were designed for pre- and post-transition use.

WPNE moved its physical channel from 42 to 25 on July 1, 2018, and WHLA moved its physical channel from 30 to 15 on September 7, 2018, both as part of the FCC's spectrum repacking, but both stations continue to use their virtual channel mappings.

Station	City of license	Channel; TV (RF)	Call sign meaning	ERP	HAAT	Transmitter coordinates	First air date	Public license info	Facility ID
WHA-TV	Madison	21 (20)	From sister station WHA radio	200 kW	454 m (1,490 ft)	43°3′21″N 89°32′6″W	May 3, 1954	Public file; LMS	6096
WHLA-TV (Note: WHLA-TV used the callsign WWWG during its construction permit from April 19 to October 1, 1973.)	La Crosse	31 (15)	WHA - La Crosse	400 kW	345.5 m (1,133.5 ft)	43°48′18.3″N 91°22′5.1″W	March 17, 1975	Public file; LMS	18780
WHRM-TV	Wausau	20 (24)	WHA - Rib Mountain	400 kW	387 m (1,270 ft)	44°55′14.2″N 89°41′28.7″W	January 20, 1976	Public file; LMS	73036
WHWC-TV	Menomonie (Note: WHWC-TV was licensed to Colfax until July 20, 1976.)	28 (27)	WHA - West Central	400 kW	350 m (1,148 ft)	45°2′48.9″N 91°51′47.6″W	November 19, 1973	Public file; LMS	18793
WLEF-TV	Park Falls	36 (36)	Lee E. Franks (former WECB executive director)	400 kW	445 m (1,460 ft)	45°56′42.5″N 90°16′22.5″W	December 15, 1977	Public file; LMS	63046
WPNE-TV	Green Bay	38 (25)	Public Broadcasting Northeast	400 kW	375 m (1,230 ft)	44°24′34.6″N 88°0′6.7″W	September 12, 1972	Public file; LMS	18798

=== Technical information ===
==== Subchannels ====
The logo for the Wisconsin Channel, the network's de facto second service, which has evolved to feature an alternative schedule of programming, analogous to that of WMVT's role as Milwaukee's secondary PBS station.

All transmitters broadcast the same four digital subchannels.

PBS Wisconsin multiplex
Subchannel	Res.	Short name	Programming
xx-1	720p	PBSWI	PBS
xx-2	720p	PBSWI 2	Wisconsin Channel
xx-3	480i	PBSWI 3	Create
xx-4	480i	PBSWI 4	PBS Kids

- The programming schedule of all three channels over-the-air depends on the main network schedule; before October 2014, on late nights without overnight instructional programming, WPT went off the air at 1 a.m. and signed back on at 6 a.m. However, after a January 2010 transmitter problem took down WPNE and commercial station WBAY-TV in Green Bay during an off the air period for two weeks, the network switched from turning off their transmitters to mainly airing a network station identification card with an outline map of the network's service in the state during off-the-air hours.
  - Beginning in October 2014, the network began 24-hour service using the late night national PBS feed or network programming to fill the overnight hours, and discontinued most instructional programming outside of one overnight hour of UW-Madison/Wisconsin Public Radio programming under the title University Place.
- A previous locally programmed PBS Kids 24/7 service aired on WPT's .2 subchannel until 2007, when PBS discontinued the service due to their interest in Sprout until 2013; subsequently the Wisconsin Channel launched in its place, along with a modified children's programming schedule across both services. The channel resumed service in January 2017 upon the launch of the national PBS Kids service on its fourth subchannel.
- Since converting all their operations to digital in April 2009, PBS Wisconsin has broadcast their programming in the 720p high definition format, though its master streams of PBS Wisconsin and the Wisconsin Channel to pay TV providers, the PBS and Spectrum apps, the network website, and Amazon Prime Video are carried in 1080p direct from PBS's nationalized master control.

==== Translators ====
A translator network also serves portions of the state where over-the-air reception for a full-power station is hindered by area topography (or in the case of Door County, distance from Green Bay), and to fill in holes between full-power stations. All of the listed translators are owned by the WECB, and flash-cut from analog to digital in the first two weeks of November 2008, including adding the subchannel services. Each translator has its virtual channel mapped to the channel number of the closest full-power station to the translator.

- W16DU-D Bloomington (translates WHLA-TV)
- W17DZ-D Sister Bay (translates WPNE-TV)
- W19EN-D River Falls (translates WHWC-TV)
- W24CL-D Grantsburg (translates WHWC-TV)
- W29ET-D Coloma (translates WHRM-TV)
- W30DZ-D Fence (translates WLEF-TV)

=== Network programming in Milwaukee and Superior–Duluth ===
PBS Wisconsin's public affairs programming is carried by WMVS in Milwaukee, including Here and Now, while Duluth's WDSE airs the shows in northeast Minnesota and northwest Wisconsin. The two stations also air the state network's live teen issues program Teen Connection quarterly with PBS Wisconsin, along with political debates and other important events originating from the Capitol such as the State of the State address and biennial budget address produced by the state network; in turn some Milwaukee PBS programming (such as Outdoor Wisconsin) and MPTV-produced debates air on PBS Wisconsin, with programs such as Wisconsin Foodie in turn airing on WMVS. Some of the state network's tape-delayed sports coverage airs in Milwaukee on WMVT.

In March 2021, PBS Wisconsin, by way of WHA-TV, was quietly added to Dish Network's Duluth–Superior local feed in standard definition.

== National presentations ==
- Around the Farm Table – food and farming show
- Once Upon a Christmas Cheery, In the Lab of Shakhashiri – seasonal special
- Sewing with Nancy – sewing show
- Storylords – educational fantasy series
- The War at Home – documentary

== See also ==
- Wisconsin Public Radio
- American Archive of Public Broadcasting
- List of three-letter broadcast call signs in the United States
