= School of Journalism and Mass Communication (University of Wisconsin–Madison) =

- Former names: Department of Journalism, School of Journalism
- Type: Public
- Established: 1927
- Director: Kathleen Bartzen Culver
- Location: Vilas Hall, 821 University Ave., Madison, Wisconsin, United States; 43°04′21.5″N 89°23′59.3″W
- Website: www.journalism.wisc.edu

The School of Journalism and Mass Communication (SJMC) is an academic unit of the University of Wisconsin–Madison, part of the university’s College of Letters and Science. It is located in Vilas Communication Hall. Established as a journalism department in 1912, it was reestablished in 1927 as the School of Journalism for undergraduate and graduate programs in journalism, strategic communication, and mass communication research. The school began offering a doctorate in mass communication in 1953 and awarded its first PhD to students in the same year.

== History ==
=== Journalism ===
In 1904, Willard Grosvenor Bleyer developed and offered the first journalism course at the University of Wisconsin-Madison.

=== Radio-television news and advertising ===
The school was among the first to introduce education in electronic editing and the offset press. It offered radio news programs before World War II, and in 1970 a radio-television news sequence was established.

Advertising and public relations education at UW–Madison developed alongside journalism studies and expanded into formal academic tracks by the mid-20th century.

=== Mass communication ===
In 1970, the school was rebranded as the School of Journalism and Mass Communication. The school moved to its first permanent location in 1972, with the opening of Vilas Communication Hall.

=== Graduate program ===
In 1949, Ralph O. Nafziger served as the school's director. Among the first such PhD programs in the nation, it granted its first degree in 1953. By 1973, the school graduated more PhDs in mass communication than any other school.

== Academic programs ==
=== Undergraduate ===
==== Bachelor's degrees ====
The school grants two degrees for undergraduate students: Journalism Bachelor of Arts (JBA) and Journalism Bachelor of Science (JBS). Students may choose either reporting or strategic communication as their major track. Those who choose to double-track take courses sequentially.

== Reputation and rankings ==
According to the 2017 Center for World University Rankings, UW-Madison ranked 4th in subject rankings for communication.

In the 2010 Assessment of Research Doctorate Programs by the National Research Council, the school's doctoral program was evaluated among more than 80 PhD communication programs nationwide. The assessment provided a range of high and low possible ranks for each indicator, with the school receiving the following ranges:

- S-Rank: Ranks 1-6 (based on criteria scholars identified as most important)
- Research: Ranks 1-6 (derived from faculty publications, citation rates, grants, and awards)

A 2010 study based on faculty hiring patterns identified the program as a primary source for faculty placement in the field. In a national survey, 221 faculty members and 49 chairs of communication departments were asked to name the top 3 US communication programs, and UW-Madison's program was ranked first.

== Notable alumni ==
See also List of University of Wisconsin–Madison people.

- Deborah Blum, Pulitzer Prize-winning journalist
- Paul Ingrassia, Pulitzer Prize-winning journalist
- Louis P. Lochner, Pulitzer Prize-winning journalist
- Anthony Shadid, two-time Pulitzer Prize-winning journalist
- Neal Ulevich, Pulitzer Prize-winning photographer
