= WHA (AM) =

Public radio station in Madison, Wisconsin

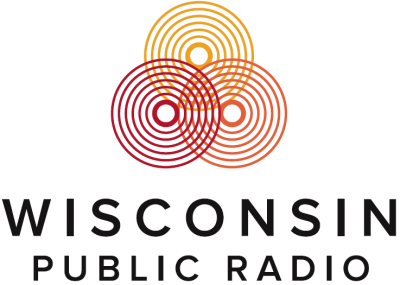
- Madison, Wisconsin; United States
- Broadcast area: Madison metropolitan area
- Frequency: 970 kHz
- Branding: Ideas Network

Programming
- Format: Public radio
- Affiliations: NPR; American Public Media

Ownership
- Owner: University of Wisconsin–Extension; (Board of Regents, University of Wisconsin System)
- Sister stations: WERN; WHAD; WHA-TV

History
- First air date: January 13, 1922 (originally experimental 9XM 1915–1917 and 1920–1922)

Technical information
- Licensing authority: FCC
- Facility ID: 6139
- Class: D
- Power: 5,000 watts (day); 51 watts (night)
- Transmitter coordinates: 43°02′30″N 89°24′34.4″W
- Translators: 100.3 W262DD (Janesville); 107.9 W300BM (Madison)

Links
- Public license information: Public file; LMS
- Website: www.wpr.org

WHA (970 AM) is a non-commercial radio station, licensed since 1922 to the University of Wisconsin and located in Madison, Wisconsin. It serves as the flagship for the Wisconsin Public Radio "WPR News Network". WHA's programming is also simulcast on co-owned FM station WERN in Madison. The station airs a schedule of news and talk programs from Wisconsin Public Radio, NPR, American Public Media, Public Radio International, the Canadian Broadcasting Corporation and the BBC.

The same call letters are used by WHA-TV in Madison, the flagship station for PBS Wisconsin.

== Broadcast frequencies ==
WHA transmits on 970 AM from a 258-foot tower at Silver Spring Farm within the University of Wisconsin–Madison Arboretum. It operates at 5,000 watts during the day. Although WHA's tower is relatively short by modern broadcasting standards, its transmitter power and Wisconsin's flat land (with near-perfect ground conductivity) gives it a daytime coverage area comparable to that of a full-power FM station. It decently covers much of south-central Wisconsin during the day, providing at least secondary coverage of the Rockford, Illinois and Milwaukee markets.

The station must significantly reduce its power at night to protect Class A (clear-channel) CBW in Winnipeg at neighboring 990 kHz from interference. It drops down to 265 watts half an hour after sunset, then to 97 watts until an hour after sunset, when it must transmit at 51 watts for the remainder of the night. This results in severely limited coverage even within Madison itself, and renders it all but unlistenable outside the city. During the winter, early spring, late summer, and fall, it is allowed to ramp up to 434 watts pre-sunrise before beginning full-power operation at sunrise.

To increase its nighttime availability and audio clarity, WHA's programming is relayed by two FM translators, plus the HD digital subchannel of a third FM station. Translator W300BM, operating on 107.9 FM to provide coverage to downtown and eastern Madison, including the UW-Madison campus, was officially part of the license of Milwaukee Ideas Network station WHAD until 2009, when it was transferred to the WHA license. In early 2013, FM sister station WERN, flagship of WPR's News and Classical Network, added a WHA simulcast on its third HD subcarrier. At that time, translator W213CE, transmitting on 90.5 FM, and also licensed to Madison, was transferred to the license of WERN and began repeating WHA by way of WERN's HD3 signal. That translator had previously been part of the license of WHHI in Highland in Iowa County, and provides coverage to the western Madison region. Until moving to WPR Music in 2024, WHAD's main signal provided Ideas Network programming to parts of eastern Madison; WHAD is licensed to Delafield, a western suburb of Milwaukee, and its transmitter is located almost equidistant between Milwaukee and Madison.

W300BM's transmitter was moved to the WISC-TV/WMSN-TV/WHA-TV candelabra tower on Madison's west side in the fall 2018. While the translator's power was reduced from 250 to 170 watts, its higher antenna position on the tower allows it to cover all of Dane County. It can be heard as far as Baraboo and Portage with a good radio. This had the effect of reducing the number of radio preset assignment slots used in an average day commuting around Madison, especially for those without an HD Radio in their office, home and vehicle; according to WPR officials, it was now possible for an Ideas Network listener to "tune your radio to 107.9 and leave it." The W215AQ translator remains active from the same tower. The translators allowed WHA to be heard clearly in some form across much of Madison's inner ring 24 hours a day. WHA is also relayed in the Janesville-Beloit area via translator W262DD on 100.3 FM.

As part of a major realignment of WPR's offerings which took effect on May 20, 2024; WHA and WERN became the flagships of the WPR News Network, successor to the Ideas Network. The translators joined the all-classical WPR Music network. However, this substantially improved coverage of NPR news programming in Madison, especially at night. Moreover, WERN penetrates further into south-central Wisconsin than the two translators. As the station's signal is already widely available through analog FM translators and WERN as HD Radio subchannel, WPR shut down the AM HD Radio transmitter for the station at the same time.

== History ==
Randall Davidson, while researching the history of WHA for his 2007 book, 9XM Talking, found that "a breathtaking amount of material has been preserved from the station's early decades." However, "the research notes and personal papers of WHA founder Earle M. Terry are not available." They were disposed of by his widow after his death.

=== Pre-World War I (9XM) ===
WHA was first licensed as a broadcasting station on January 13, 1922, to the Department of Physics at the University of Wisconsin in Madison. However, prior to this the university had extensive experience in radio experimentation and broadcasting, with the initial transmissions using Morse code, followed by pioneering audio broadcasts.

Radio (then known as wireless telegraphy) experimentation began at the university in the first decade of the 1900s. In 1914, Electrical Engineering department professor Edward Bennett constructed a spark gap transmitter, which was only capable of transmitting the dots-and-dashes of Morse code. The following year this equipment was transferred to physics professor Earle M. Terry, and Terry worked with a group of physics and engineering students to construct additional radio apparatus in the basement of Science Hall, including stringing an antenna between that building and the Mining and Metallurgy Laboratory.

In June 1915 the U.S. Department of Commerce, which regulated radio at the time, issued the university an experimental radio station license, with the call sign 9XM. 9XM was initially used for point-to-point communication with other stations. Additional activities included sending game reports for a Wisconsin-Ohio State basketball game on February 17, 1917, and, beginning the following April, a telegraphic news exchange with other universities.

Starting in 1914 radio stations located at the University of North Dakota, Nebraska Wesleyan University, and the University of Nebraska established radiotelegraphic broadcasts of weather forecasts on a regular schedule, as a service for local farmers. Beginning in 1915, Eric R. Miller, a former student of Professor Terry's who was the meteorologist in charge of the U.S Weather Bureau's Madison office, worked with Terry to make arrangements for 9XM to provide a similar service for the state of Wisconsin. On December 1, 1916, it was announced that 9XM would begin to transmit daily (except Sundays) weather forecasts, using Morse code. These transmissions were made at 11:00 a.m. Central Time on a wavelength of 1,700 meters (176 kHz), and were scheduled to immediately follow the time signals transmitted from 10:55 to 11:00 a.m. by NAA, the U.S. Navy station in Arlington, Virginia.

The use of Morse code somewhat limited the usability of these broadcasts, as it required farmers to learn how to translate the telegraphic dots-and-dashes. Vacuum tube transmitters, capable of audio transmissions, had recently been developed, and in early 1917 Terry began making test transmissions using the new technology. For one of these tests he hosted a gathering at his home to listen to a transmission of phonograph records, although at the time the guests were generally unimpressed with hearing music that could just as easily be played on a nearby record player. But because vacuum tube technology was still in the experimental stage, 9XM did not introduce regular audio broadcasts at this time.

=== World War I (wartime authorization) ===
With the entrance of the United States into World War I in April 1917, the U.S. government assumed control of the entire radio industry, and it became illegal for civilians to possess a working radio receiver. At the same time all civilian radio transmitters, including 9XM, were shut down, ending the radiotelegraphic weather reports for the duration of the war.

Although 9XM had been silenced, in May, at the recommendation of A. Hoyt Taylor, district communication superintendent at the Great Lakes Naval Station in Illinois, the university was permitted to reactivate radio operations, now under the supervision of the U.S. Navy. (During the war, the Navy issued new call signs to the stations under its control, but there is no information about what call signs were used by the university transmitters during this period.) Station facilities were relocated from Science Hall to Sterling Hall, where the studios remained until 1934.

The research that took place during the war was done in secret. After the war, it was revealed that university staff had tested radio communication with submarines, in addition to working with the Army Signal Corps to develop radiotelephones for aviation use. The university also provided radio technology training classes for Signal Corps recruits. Additionally, weather information was transmitted to ships operating on the Great Lakes.

Professor Terry continued work on developing vacuum-tube transmitters, and in March 1919 announced that audio transmissions had been successfully made from Madison to the Great Lakes station, using "a vacuum power tube which is said to be better than any commercial bulb".

=== Post World War I (9XM and WHA) ===
After World War I, the U.S. government relinquished its control of radio, and in October 1919 lifted the ban on civilian radio stations. In the fall of 1919, the university was authorized to operate a "War Department Training and Rehabilitation School" station with the call sign "WX3", and on February 11, 1920, received an Experimental station license that revived the 9XM call sign.

Work soon began to re-establish the daily weather forecast broadcasts. In January 1920, reports from both the Weather Bureau's Eric R. Miller and the university's physics department stated that the transmissions would soon restart, this time by radiotelephone. However, when the service was reintroduced in February, the forecasts were still being sent only in Morse code. During the university's summer break the weather forecast broadcasts were temporarily suspended, then restarted in September.

A key problem delaying the upgrade to audio transmissions was a lack of vacuum tubes. They were produced by the physics department, in a process that required glass-blowing skills. Finally, on January 3, 1921, the radiotelephone equipment was ready, and for the first time spoken word weather broadcasts were made. (Because telegraphic sounds can be heard for greater distances than spoken word, until 1923 the audio broadcasts were then repeated in Morse code.) Weekly Friday night musical concerts were introduced later that same month.

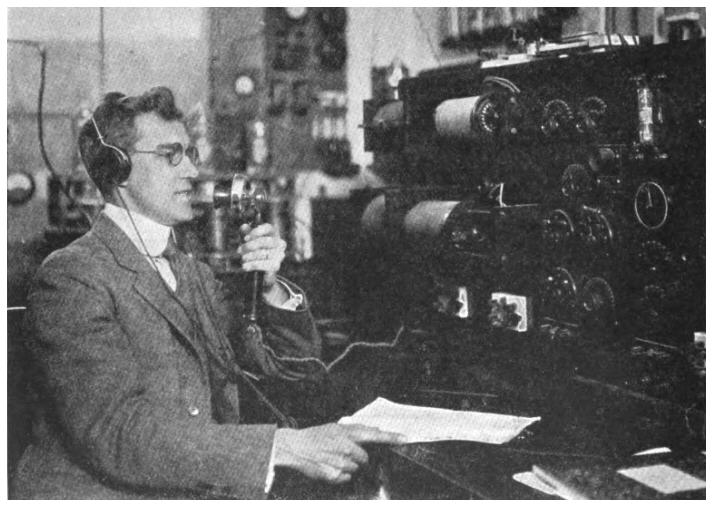
Prof. Alfred B. Haake delivering a talk on economics at WHA (1922)

Initially there were no formal standards for stations providing a broadcast service, so there was no problem with 9XM broadcasting under an Experimental license. However, effective December 1, 1921, the Department of Commerce adopted regulations defining a broadcast service. The new regulations specified two transmitting wavelengths – 360 meters (833 kHz) for "entertainment", and 485 meters (619 kHz) for "market and weather reports" — and also required stations making broadcasts intended for the general public to hold a "Limited Commercial" license. Professor Terry filed an application for the new license, and on January 13, 1922, the university was issued its first broadcasting station authorization, with the randomly assigned call letters of WHA. In addition to the two broadcasting wavelengths, the station was authorized to use 410 meters (731 kHz) "for intercommunication between college stations". This, along with the University of Minnesota's WLB, was the first broadcasting station license issued to an educational institution.

For a few more years the university continued to renew the 9XM experimental license, which was used for conducting investigative work, until late 1926, when the license was permanently deleted. Wisconsin Public Radio commemorates 9XM in its fund-raising efforts, recognizing network donors who give more than $1,200 annually as members of the "9XM Leadership Circle".

As it struggled to establish itself, issues with funding, available staff, and technical problems limited WHA's schedule. The station suspended operations during the university's 1922 summer break, then, because of technical difficulties, was unable to restart regular broadcasting until January 8, 1923. After again suspending operations for the 1924 summer break, the station was formally deleted by the government on September 8, although it was relicensed, again with the call letters WHA, on October 14.

In 1927, the Federal Radio Commission (FRC) was created to regulate U.S. radio stations, and the new agency implemented a series of frequency reassignments. On November 11, 1928, with the implementation of the FRC's General Order 40, WHA was assigned to 570 kHz, on a time-sharing basis with stations WPCC in Chicago and WRM in Urbana, Illinois. Effective April 26, 1929, the station was reassigned to 940 kHz, now limited to daytime-only operation.

Although the Great Depression caused many college radio stations to go silent because of financial pressures, in 1930 the state of Wisconsin began providing both WHA and WLBL in Stevens Point with funding to further their educational offerings. After several proof-of-effectiveness experiments in radio education, UW-Madison planned a school of the air series for WHA's broadcasting. Wisconsin School of the Air's first program aired on October 5, 1931. In the fall of 1931, the Wisconsin School of the Air provided 10 weekly programs designed to supplement grade school curricula. Other programs addressed government, agricultural, and homemaker audiences.

The station's longest-running program, Chapter a Day has aired since at least 1932 and may have originated in the late 1920s according to some accounts.

In the summer of 1932, WHA relocated its transmitter a couple of miles (3 kilometers) south to its current site at Silver Spring Farm. This site had been used by the Wisconsin State Journal station, WISJ, but was no longer needed after that station merged operations with The Capital Times station, WIBA.

In 1934, WHA studios were relocated from Sterling Hall to Radio Hall, an 1880s vintage heating plant building. In 1972 the studios moved again, to Vilas Communication Hall.

In 1936, WHA installed a custom-built transmitter. In 1951, the station retired this transmitter and purchased a 5,000-watt Westinghouse transmitter. The custom-built transmitter had operated for over 52,000 hours.

On March 29, 1941, as part of the implementation of the North American Regional Broadcasting Agreement, WHA, along with the other stations on 940, moved to its current dial position of 970 kHz. However, it was still required to sign off at sundown. The lack of nighttime hours limited WHA's potential programming even after the creation of what is now Wisconsin Public Radio in 1948. With this in mind, when the state began building the network of FM stations that evolved into WPR, it opted to have Milwaukee-area station WHAD licensed to Delafield, halfway between Milwaukee and Madison, to provide nighttime service to part of Madison when WHA was required to sign off. WHA made several unsuccessful attempts over the years to be assigned to a clear-channel frequency, or at least to a better dial location that would have enabled it to remain on the air at night.

The Canadian series for children, The Friendly Giant, was created in 1953 on WHA. The show, starring Bob Homme, later moved to local sister station WHA-TV before making its way to Canadian television on the CBC Television network. The long-running dramatic radio series Earplay was created by WHA in the fall of 1971.

In December 1987, after almost 60 years of efforts to remain on the air after sundown, WHA was authorized to commence nighttime operations. However, it had to reduce its power to 51 watts at sundown. This effectively limits its coverage area to Madison itself and its closest-in suburbs in Dane County, and even in that area the station is barely listenable. The problem was first alleviated with low-power translators, then with HD Radio subcarriers after the turn of the millennium. In addition, a number of WHA's sister stations provide some coverage of the Madison area at night.

== Pioneer broadcasting station status ==
Although WHA's license only dates from January 13, 1922, its broadcast history is commonly combined with the earlier audio broadcasts made by experimental station 9XM. A plaque installed in 1958 on the university's Madison campus credits "9XM-WHA" as "The Oldest Station in the Nation", stating that it began "broadcasting on a regular schedule in 1919". However, the 1919 starting date has been challenged. In 1960, a review carried in the Journal of Broadcasting, "Oldest Station in the Nation?", concluded that there is no evidence for regular audio broadcasts by 9XM prior to its inauguration of spoken word weather forecasts on January 3, 1921. A second article appearing in 1977 in the same journal, "Broadcasting's Oldest Stations: An Examination of Four Claimants" by Joseph E. Baudino and John M. Kittross came to the same conclusion, as did Randall Davidson's 2007 detailed station history, 9XM Talking. Moreover, on at least two occasions WHA's original station manager, Earle M. Terry, credited KDKA in Pittsburgh, Pennsylvania, which began broadcasting as 8ZZ on November 2, 1920, as being the oldest surviving station. Other stations that make claims for being older than both 9XM/WHA and 8ZZ/KDKA include KCBS in San Francisco, California, which traces its history to a number of predecessor stations operated by Charles Herrold dating back to 1912; 8MK/WWJ in Detroit, Michigan, which began regular broadcasts in August 1920; WOC in Davenport, Iowa, which traces its origin to station 9BY, which began regular broadcasts around September 1920; and 9ZAF/KLZ in Denver, Colorado, with regular programs beginning in October 1920.

The University of Minnesota's WLB (now KUOM) received its first broadcasting license on the same day as WHA, January 13, 1922. Although at this time there was no differentiation between commercial and non-commercial stations, these were the first two broadcasting licenses issued to educational institutions. The licenses were not time-stamped, however WLB's serial number, Limited Commercial license No. 275, was one less than WHA's No. 276. Comparing audio broadcasts conducted by the two universities' experimental license predecessors, 9XM's January 3, 1921, inauguration of weather forecasts preceded, by a few months, the market broadcasts made by the University of Minnesota's 9XI, which began in the spring of 1921.

== See also ==
- List of initial AM-band station grants in the United States
- List of three-letter broadcast call signs in the United States
