= Wisconsin Educational Communications Board =

Government agency for public broadcasting in Wisconsin, USA

The Wisconsin Educational Communications Board (ECB) is a Wisconsin state agency that plans, develops, constructs and operates statewide public radio, public television, public safety, and educational telecommunication systems and programs, and oversees over 60 FCC-licensed broadcast and support stations.

The ECB operates the Wisconsin Public Radio network and the PBS Wisconsin television network in partnership with the University of Wisconsin-Madison. In addition, The ECB is responsible for maintaining the state's public safety broadcasting systems. It also distributes educational programming for Wisconsin's K-12 schools via online media.

== Establishment and governance ==
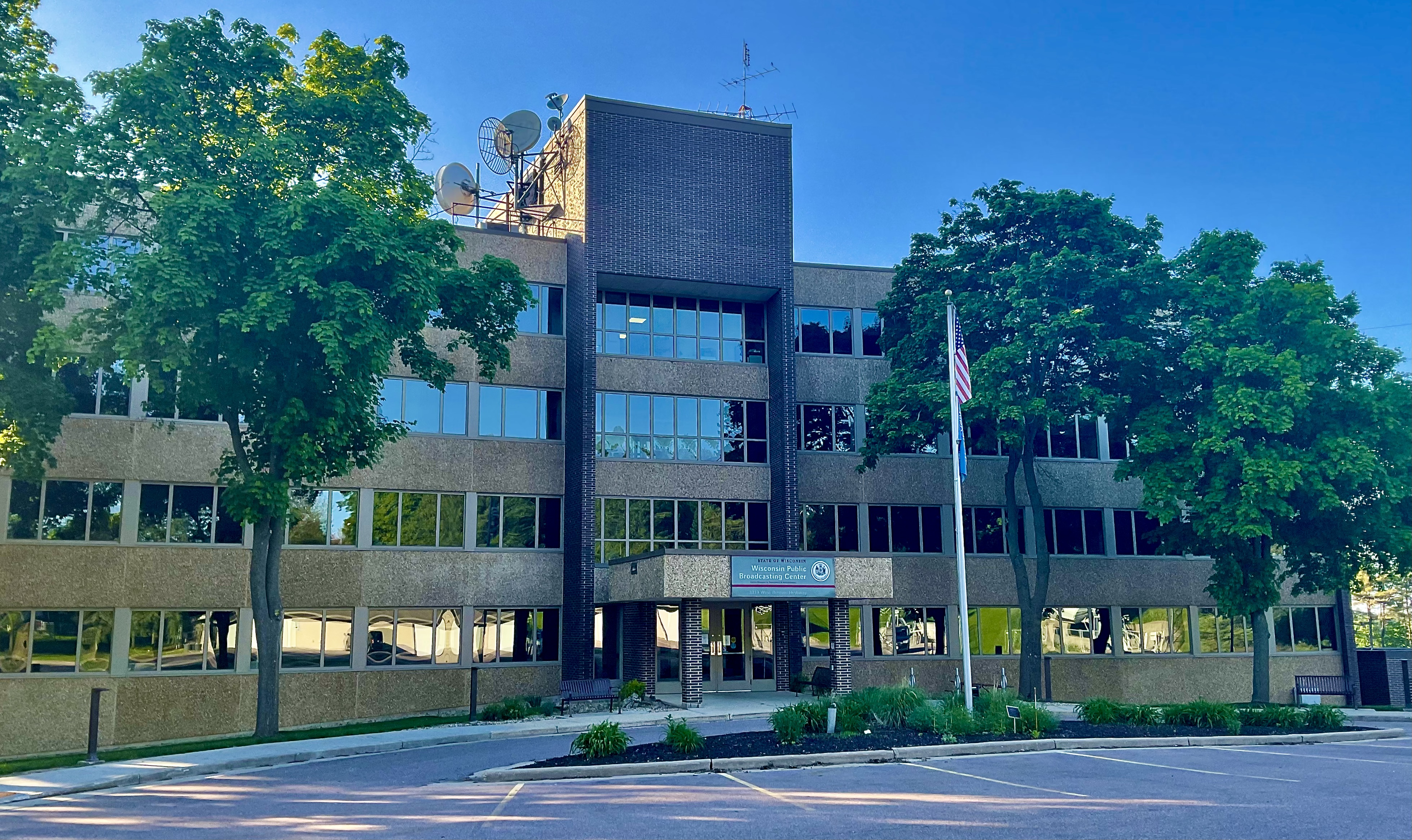
The Wisconsin Educational Communications Board/Public Broadcasting facility along the Madison Beltline, where PBS Wisconsin and Wisconsin Public Radio are also headquartered and master control is based from. Actual studio operations are based within Vilas Hall on the UW campus.

The ECB is established and governed by state statute: WI Stat § 39.11 (2015), with additional legislation modifying its status, funding and governance

It is governed by a Board of Directors, and managed by an Executive Director.

== Public broadcasting ==
The agency is assigned to ensuring that public radio and public television programs and services are made available throughout Wisconsin, and that these programs and services reflect and respond to the educational and cultural needs of the state's residents.

Additionally, the ECB manages the NOAA Weather Radio All Hazards stations in Wisconsin, and the state's Emergency Alert and Amber alert networks.

In a 2011 state audit, the ECB reported that it operated

- 2 public radio networks of
  - 14 FM stations and
  - an AM station

(13 of the FM sites, and the AM site, were broadcasting digital radio signals in addition to analog);

- a public television network comprising
  - 5 digital stations;
- Multiple translator stations
  - 3 FM translators,
  - 6 TV translators;
- a network of
  - 26 NOAA Weather Radio weather service broadcast sites;
- held multiple Educational Broadband Service licenses.

The ECB also manages 9 satellite earth stations.

The digital signal on 13 stations provided HD Radio clarity, for listeners equipped with HD Radio receivers. However, it required higher broadcast energy, resulting in higher utility bills for the stations. The HD equipment had higher acquisition, operating, maintenance and replacement costs. It also interfered, to some extent, with the strength and quality of reception for non-HD listeners. And few listeners were HD-equipped. Consequently, ECB and WPR decided, in late 2020, to begin discontinuing HD Radio service at seven of the ECB/WPR HD Radio stations -- KUWS-FM/Superior, WHSA-FM/Brule-Superior, WUWS-FM/Ashland, WHBM-FM/Park Falls, WHWC-FM/Menomonie-Eau Claire, WHAA-FM/Adams-Wisconsin Rapids and WHDI-FM/Sister Bay—reverting, instead, to normal broadcast signals.

== Educational programs ==
The agency has cooperative relationships with, and provides educational and instructional programming for, public television stations WDSE-TV/Duluth-Superior and Milwaukee PBS, as well as with several University of Wisconsin System college radio stations. In addition, The ECB assists others in the public sector to meet their needs through the use of telecommunications.

The ECB program "Wisconsin Media Lab" has provided free educational programs, online, for K-12 schools. It has produced and licensed educational content, making video programs, interactive websites, e-books, images, sound files, lesson plans and other products available to schools throughout the state at no cost. The resources have been aligned with academic standards, have covered all curricular areas, and have been made available online at WIMediaLab.org. An advisory committee of subject matter experts and Wisconsin educators has guided each production, and the products have undergone extensive evaluation and testing in schools.

In October 2014, ECB's K-12 education programming moved online. These resources now reside at PBS Wisconsin Education providing 24/7 access to content for students and teachers, and has allowed PBS Wisconsin, MPBS and WDSE to free up their television schedules for other content.

== Budget and staffing ==
The agency had a 2021 budget of approximately $20 million, and staffing equal to 55 full-time employees.

=== Budget ===
In 2015, the ECB, as with many public broadcasting organizations in Republican-governed states, faced a loss of a third of its state funding in Governor Scott Walker's proposed budget, from $8 million to $5.2 million—triggering an intense political response.

While the public radio and TV stations were unlikely to be severely affected (they had revenue from other sources, including subscriptions and sponsorships), the change threatened to sharply diminish the functioning of the agency's Wisconsin Media Lab, as well as limiting the availability of necessary maintenance and repairs to the broadcast equipment of the various ECB-governed stations. The state legislature's Joint Finance Committee allowed some of the cuts, however it limited them to half the Governor's two-year $5-million total cuts request, cutting $2.3 million from the state subsidy.

By Fiscal Year 2020, the state contribution from "General Purpose Revenue" had settled at $6 million, with "Program Revenue" (income from operations) required to supply the remaining $11.6 million of the ECB budget.

=== Staffing ===
With its numerous electronic communications operations, ECB requires technicians and engineers with a highly specialized set of skills, and has hired many with U.S. military backgrounds in those fields. With about half of the ECB's technical staff eligible for retirement, the agency continues to seek to hire transitioning U.S. military service members and veterans, Executive Director Marta Bechtol has said. A demographic analysis in the 2010s reported that the ECB the highest percentage of veteran employees of all Wisconsin state agencies (except Wisconsin's Department of Military Affairs).
