= WIUX-LP =

WIUX
- Bloomington, Indiana; United States
- Broadcast area: Monroe County, Indiana
- Frequency: 99.1 (MHz)
- Branding: WIUX

Programming
- Language: English
- Format: Variety

Ownership
- Owner: Indiana University Student Broadcasting

History
- First air date: June 4, 2007 (99.1 MHz) January 30, 2006 (100.3 MHz)
- Former call signs: WIUS; WQAX; WIN; WFQR; WQAD
- Former frequencies: 100.3 (MHz)
- Call sign meaning: W Indiana University WQAX

Technical information
- Licensing authority: FCC
- Facility ID: 123644
- Class: L1
- ERP: 22 watts
- HAAT: 63.1 meters
- Transmitter coordinates: 39°10′17.00″N 86°30′58.00″W

Links
- Public license information: Public file; LMS
- Webcast: Indiana.edu (320 kbit/s) Indiana.edu (256 kbit/s) Indiana.edu (128 kbit/s) Indiana.edu (32 kbit/s) Indiana.edu (16 kbit/s)
- Website: http://wiux.org

WIUX-LP (99.1 FM) is a low power student-run college radio station in Bloomington, Indiana, United States. The station is owned by Indiana University Student Broadcasting with the slogan 'Pure Student Radio'. low power FM

== Operation ==
WIUX is operated by student volunteers currently enrolled in the university. The station has no paid employees or faculty supervisors. The station broadcasts its main programming on 99.1 FM and also maintains an online stream, called "B-Side", which is online only.

WIUX is overseen by a student board of directors, which facilitates the station's committees and programs. The election of the board for the next school year is held each spring. WIUX's committees include music, public relations, marketing, programming, news, special events, sports, and engineering.

== History ==
- 1963 – WQAD, a carrier current AM radio station was founded in Wright Quadrangle at Indiana University, with a frequency of 730 kHz. WQAD beamed its programming to Wright Quadrangle, Teter Quadrangle, Read Center, Forest Quadrangle and what was then known as the Graduate Residence Center or GRC for the first time on 730 AM via carrier current throughout Wright Quad on January 5, 1963. The station was started by physics major Bill Weaverling, chemistry major Steve Peterson, and education major Jerry Pugh.
- 1964 – WFQR Radio, also a carrier current AM radio station, was founded in Foster Quadrangle; the call letters stood for "Foster Quadrangle Radio." Its programming was beamed to the dormitories along Fee Lane, including Foster, McNutt and Briscoe Quadrangles.
- 1965 – WFQR Radio changed its call letters to WIN, and continued to operate from Foster Quadrangle.
- 1966 – At times during the 1966–67 school year, each station originated a "network feed" which was sent to the carrier current transmitters of all wired student housing. At other times for this final school year, WIN and WQAD maintained separate programming.
- September 1967 – The two stations merge to form WIUS Radio, still strictly a carrier current operation. It was supposed to be at 620 kHz in all student housing, but until the end of carrier current operations, some transmitters continued to operate at 730 kHz. The original WIUS studios were located at 617 E. 8th St., today the site of the Mathers Museum of World Cultures. The building, a two-story brick house, once belonged to a Bloomington mayor and to legendary Indiana University swimming coach James "Doc" Counsilman. All IU undergraduate dormitories are wired, and an ambitious plan to wire graduate housing and IU fraternities and sororities is unveiled; little of this plan is ever accomplished.
- October 10, 1972 – On the first day of National Fire Prevention Week, a pre-dawn fire destroyed the original WIUS studios. The fire was arson, set in at least two locations, the sales office at the front of the building and the administrative offices in the rear; the person or persons responsible have never been arrested. For one week, WIUS programming aired from a spare studio of the Indiana University Radio and Television Service. WIUS then relocated until Spring Break of 1973 to the old Elliott House WQAD studios, using salvaged and borrowed equipment, records that survived the fire and records from student DJ collections.
- March 1973 – WIUS moves over spring break from Elliott House into a house at 815 E. 8th St., two blocks from the previous WIUS house.

WQAX Logo from 1970s

- September 1973 – The IU Student Broadcast Corporation, a not-for-profit student corporation, creates a new radio station, WQAX, partly out of frustrated efforts to get WIUS onto the off-campus cable TV system; the attitude of one IU administrator towards the idea was quoted at the time as "Students shouldn't be talking to townspeople." Many of the first WQAX programmers were former WIUS members, and the two stations maintained a friendly rivalry as WIUS finally gained access to its own cable FM frequency. The former WQAD call letters could not be assigned as they were used as the FCC-licensed American Broadcasting Company affiliate on TV channel 8 in Moline, Illinois.
- Spring 1974 – In addition to carrier current, WIUS begins to air its programming on the local Bloomington, Ind., cable TV system, then owned by Monroe Cablevision, at 95.1 mHz. Broadcasts to IU dormitories and a select number of fraternities and sororities (notably Alpha Epsilon Pi, Evans Scholars and the houses surrounding them) remained carrier current, although after 1977 the carrier current system was allowed to deteriorate and reception was often spotty or absent in certain dormitories.
- 1973 to 1993 – WQAX, identified on-air as "Quacks," was a college/community access radio station at 100.3 MHz (non-broadcast) on the local cable TV system in Bloomington, Ind. Originally operating from an office in the Indiana Memorial Union, supplied by the IU Student Association, which assisted in its founding as an alternative to the then-tightly formatted contemporary hit rock WIUS programming, WQAX studios moved several times during its 20-year life.

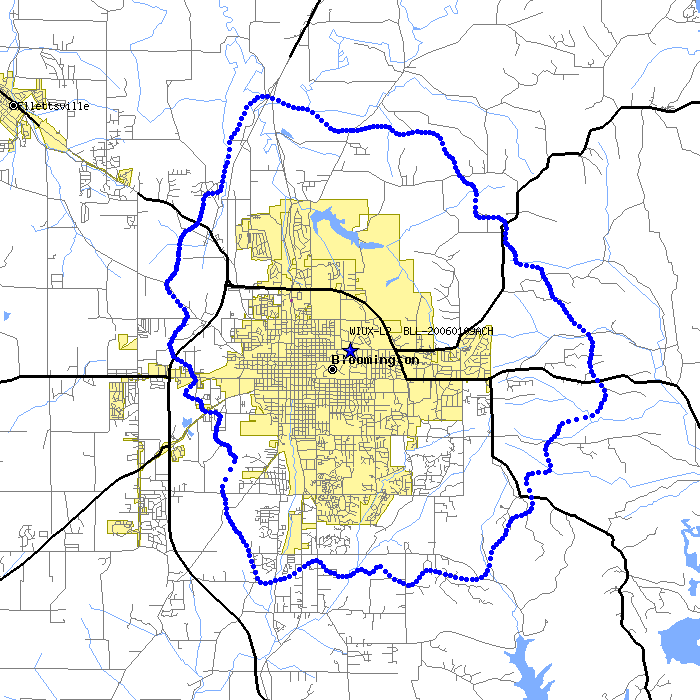
WIUX Contour Map [FCC file: FL1104780

- 1994 – WIUS switched to funding as part of a student activity fee. WIUS added open-air AM broadcasts beginning October 3, from a low-power transmitter, identical to those used for roadside traffic reports in any cities, atop the Indiana University Library, broadcasting to an approximately three-mile radius at 1570 kHz, while maintaining its cable FM presence. This transmitter will remain in place until January 2006.
- 2004 – An application for a student-operated FM radio license is submitted to the FCC. The FCC delays granting a low-power FM license to WIUS because of another application in the Bloomington area.
- March 2005 – After settling the debate in court, the FCC grants the permit to WIUS and assigns the operating frequency of 100.3 MHz, identical to the former WQAX cable access station. The move to an FCC licensed broadcast FM station, however means that the station will need to change its call letters. Since 1981, WIUS-FM has operated as the FCC-licensed, student-operated FM station at Western Illinois University in Macomb, Illinois. The selection of WIUX as the new call sign (usage of the "X") is a small tribute to the former WQAX, its Indiana student staff (now alumni), and the Bloomington area that it served.
- January 2006 – WIUX is born and signs on (over the air) at 100.3 FM, operated and programmed by IU students,

Early WIUX logo

- June 2007 – WIUX moves to 99.1 FM after the FCC awarded the 100.3 FM frequency to WYGB in Columbus, Ind.
- July 2014 – WIUX relocates to a temporary location at 715–717 E. 8th Street, just a block away from its previous house. The move comes as Indiana University makes plans to build a new fraternity house on 8th Street between Woodlawn Avenue and Park Avenue.
- March 2016 – WIUX named Best College/University Radio Station in the nation by the Intercollegiate Broadcasting System Awards
- July 2017 – WIUX moves from its house into Franklin Hall, home of the new IU media school.

== FCC/Right to broadcast controversy ==
On October 31, 2006, WIUX announced on its website that the Federal Communications Commission was granting the 100.3 mHz frequency to a Class A FM radio station in Edinburgh, Indiana, taking over the frequency WIUX had been granted only the previous year. Because the Indiana University student-based station operates as a low-power station, the FCC maintains that it has the right to move the station or remove it from the air. Indiana University filed a petition against the move. The dean of students and vice president of student affairs at Indiana University, Richard McKaig, states in the official petition (available through the WIUX website): "The Indiana frequency did not appear on the Commission's internet site or on a public notice until after the comment reply date of June 13, 2006 deadline. As a result, we did not have a fair chance to file public comments." On November 6, both Indiana senators, Evan Bayh (Dem) and Richard Lugar (Rep), wrote petitions of support for WIUX to the FCC.

On June 4, 2007, WIUX moved from 100.3 FM to 99.1 FM.

== Radio format ==
WIUX is a variety radio format college radio station. It features music of different genres, news, sports, and talk programming. Students broadcast live play-by-play of Indiana Hoosiers football, men's and women's basketball, and men's and women's soccer. (The Indiana Hoosiers Sports Network affiliate is WHCC). The broadcasts have a focus on local music and local news.

== Awards ==
In 2016 and 2020, WIUX won "Best college radio station in America" in the Intercollegiate Broadcasting System Awards. In 2009, WIUX was nominated for the mtvU Woodie Award for best college radio station in America.

== Culture Shock ==
Culture Shock is a free yearly festival traditionally held in Dunn Meadow or 3rd St. Park by WIUX. It typically happens in the beginning of April. Culture Shock was founded in 1986 by Jim Kerns and John Polak. The lineup has included many national, regional, and local acts.

Yo La Tengo (1995), Antenna (1995), Black Moth Super Rainbow, Maps & Atlases, Richard Swift, Xiu Xiu, Husband & Wife, Sunset Rubdown (2007). Beach House (2008), the Dodos (2008), White Hinterland, Pattern is Movement, Rodeo Ruby Child (2008). Four Tet, Destroyer, Extra Golden, Death Vessel (2009). Best Coast, Clovers, Light Pollution (2010). Ty Segall, Beach Fossils, The War on Drugs, Terror Pigeon Dance Revolt, Sleeping Bag (2011). Fang Island, the People's Temple, Busman's Holiday, Saintseneca, Triptides (2012). Mikal Cronin, Maps & Atlases, Apache Droupout, Charlie Patton's War (2013). Mac Demarco (2014), Royal Bangs (2014), Tunde Olarian (2014), Sleeping Bag (2014), Drekka (2014). Foxygen, Twin Peaks, TOPS, Mike Adams at His Honest Weight, Oreo Jones + Sirius Blvck, Thee Tsunamis, Dietrich Jon, and Vista Kid Cruiser (2015). Neon Indian, Whitney, White Reaper (2016), Hoops (2016), Brenda's Friend, Spissy, Dasher, The Underhills, and Brownies in Cinema (2016). Noname, Sales, Flasher, Post Animal, Kevin Krauter, High Fiber, House Olympics, Amy O, Drayco McCoy, F L A C O, and Mathaius Young (2017). Chicano Batman, Milo, Joy Again, Melkbelly, Major Murphy, Nice Try, brz, Kailachare, Skull Cult, and Heaven Honey (2018). Saba, SHAED, Lala Lala, Black Belt Eagle Scout, Boa, The Slaps, Chives, Willis & Diop, Allison Victoria, and ktfaithful (2019). Okay Kaya, Nissim Black, Russian Cowboy (2021)

WIUX Culture Shock Music Festival 2020 was cancelled due to the COVID-19 pandemic.

WIUX Culture Shock Music Festival 2022 was replaced with the community event Music Market which featured local performers, artists and vendors.

== Notable alumni ==
- Michael Uslan – The originator of the Batman movies and the first individual to teach a comic book folklore class at an accredited university.
- Damon Bruce – Sports talk show host at KGMZ 95.7 The Game in San Francisco.
- Ben Heisler – Executive producer and host at KCSP 610 Sports Radio in Kansas City.
- Timothy Hittle – Academy Award-nominated director, writer and animator.
- Gary Schoenwetter, Vice President, SiriusXM

== See also ==
- Campus radio
- List of college radio stations in the United States
