= WRSM =

WRSM may refer to:

- WRSM (FM), a radio station (89.1 FM) licensed to serve Rising Sun, Maryland, United States
- WKDG, a defunct radio station (1540 AM) formerly licensed to serve Sumiton, Alabama, United States, which held the call sign WRSM until 2009
- WBGU (FM), which initially operated under the callsign WRSM (600 AM).
