= WRUC =

Coordinates: 42.818°N 73.929°W

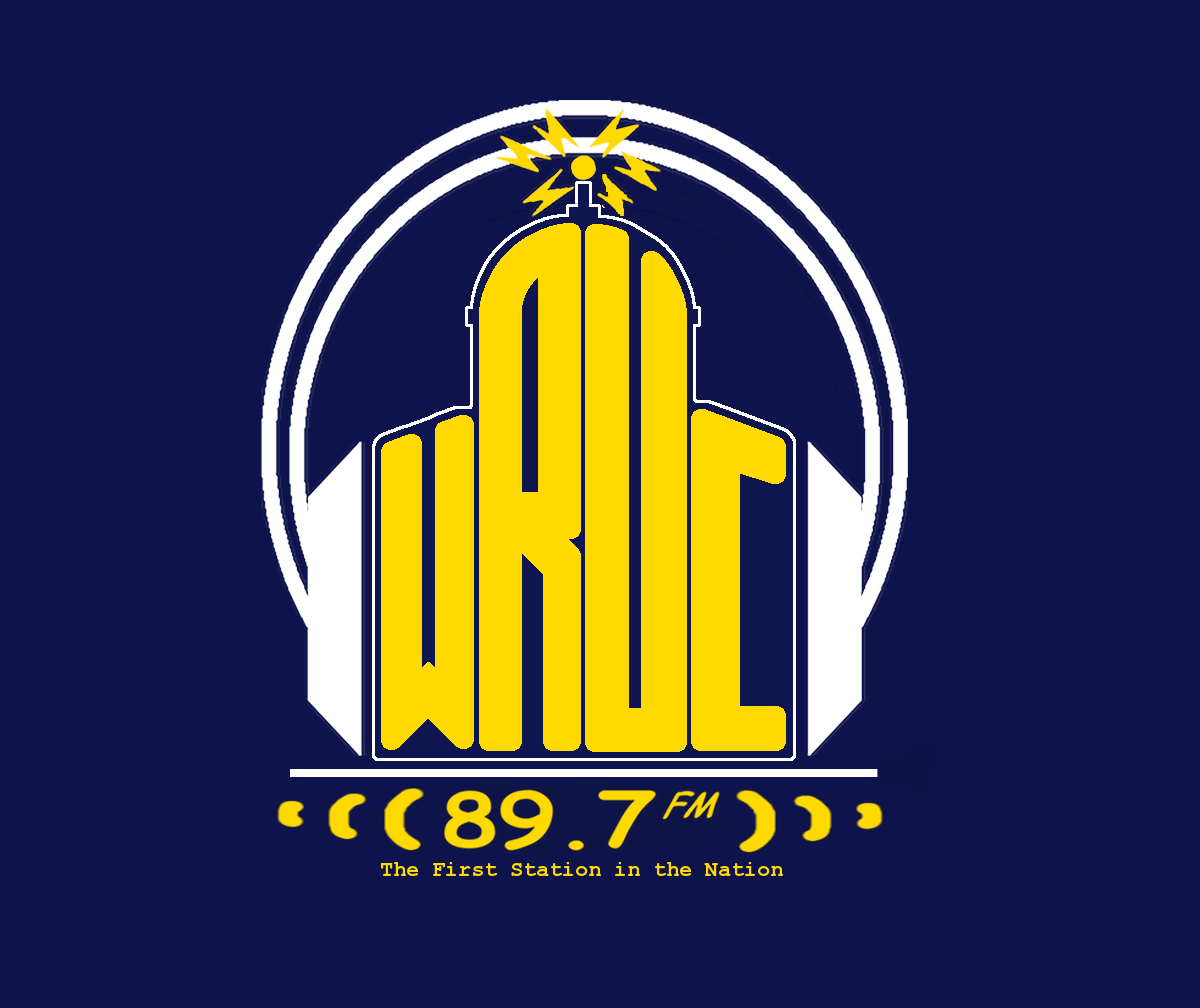
- Schenectady, New York; United States
- Broadcast area: Schenectady, Capital District
- Frequency: 89.7 MHz
- Branding: WRUC 89.7 FM; The First Station In The Nation

Programming
- Format: College Radio

Ownership
- Owner: Union College

History
- First air date: 1975
- Call sign meaning: Wireless Radio of Union College

Technical information
- Licensing authority: FCC
- Facility ID: 68273
- Class: A
- ERP: 100 watts
- HAAT: -27 meters

Links
- Public license information: Public file; LMS
- Website: http://wruc.union.edu

WRUC (89.7 MHz) is an independent educational college radio station, owned and operated by Union College in Schenectady, New York. The station transmits with an effective radiated power of 100 watts, covering an approximate 12-mile radius, though reception in fringe areas depends on the terrain. WRUC also streams its programming on Internet radio. The station's offices and studios are located in the Reamer Campus Center on the Union College campus.

WRUC's slogan is "The First Station In The Nation". The station traces its history back to October 14, 1920, the date an amateur station located at Union College first began making regular broadcasts. However, WRUC's priority claim is not widely accepted. There are continuity issues, because, after the demise of Union's broadcasting station, WRL, in 1924, the college did not resume any broadcasting activities until 1941. In addition, there are several stations that claim even longer histories, including KCBS (1909), KJR (1919), and WWJ (August 1920).

== Programming ==
WRUC is entirely run by the students of Union College, and only operates regularly when the college is in session. The station offers listeners an eclectic mix of alternative programming, Union sports and news.

=== Union College radio alumni ===
- Dick Ferguson (Class of 1967) - the 2002 National Association of Broadcasters National Radio Award winner. Ferguson retired as the Executive Vice President of Cox Radio in 2006.
- Richard Roth (Class of 1970) - a former correspondent for CBS News and NBC News
- Scott Wykoff (Class of 1985) - now a reporter for Baltimore radio station WBAL (AM)

== Earlier Union College radio activities ==
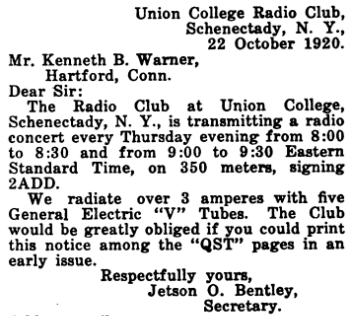
Announcement of weekly programs over amateur station 2ADD (1920)

Although WRUC as an FM station only dates back to 1975, Union College has a long history of experimental radio work and pioneer broadcasting, much of which was conducted by students.

In the fall of 1915, a "Technical and Training School" station license was issued to "Walter L. Upson (Union College)", with the call sign "2YU", which was operated in conjunction with a newly formed Radio Club. In the summer of 1916, Dr. E. J. Berg and Dr. Alex Stevenson installed a spark-gap transmitter at the College, which could only transmit the dots-and-dashes of Morse code. By late 1916 experiments were also being conducted using the newly developed vacuum-tube transmitters, which were capable of making audio transmissions. Included as part of this work was a series of test radio concerts. However, upon the entrance of the United States into World War One, effective April 7, 1917 the government ordered all civilian radio stations, including 2YU, shut down for the duration of the conflict.

=== Amateur station 2ADD (1920) ===
After the war, in the fall of 1919 civilian radio licenses began to be issued again, including a standard amateur station authorization with the call sign 2ADD granted to Wendell King at the Union College Electrical Laboratory. The Radio Club was reformed and resumed activities, which included a more organized series of entertainment broadcasts intended to be heard by the local community. The first of these broadcasts was made on October 14, 1920, and a letter dated October 22, 1920 that appeared in the December 1920 issue of the amateur radio magazine QST announced that the College would be broadcasting weekly radio concerts "every Thursday evening from 8:00 to 8:30 and from 9:00 to 9:30 Eastern Standard Time, on 350 meters [857 kHz], signing 2ADD".

=== Experimental station 2XQ (1921) ===
An Experimental license, 2XQ, had been issued to Union College in late 1919, and the broadcasts were soon switched to using this authorization. In the summer of 1921, an article featuring the station noted that not only were the Thursday night concerts continuing, but the station had added Sunday night sermons prepared by Union College President C. A. Richmond. The same article also reported that the station, "equipped with the most modern of apparatus", had been heard as far away as 1,200 miles (1,900 kilometers). The Radio Club designed a portable radio for receiving 2XQ transmissions, and as a publicity stunt, mounted it on a baby carriage that was wheeled around town to show off its capabilities. The invention was promoted as "a great pacifier for a younger generation", and received extensive national publicity.

Union College Experimental Station 2XQ, 1921

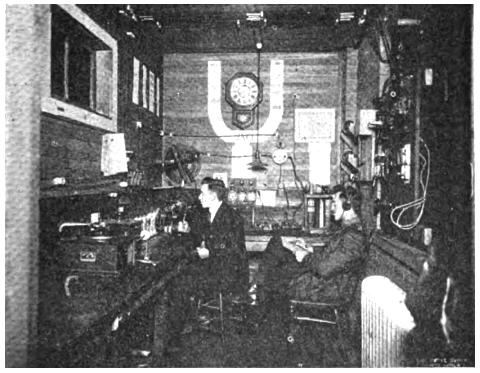
2XQ Transmission Room

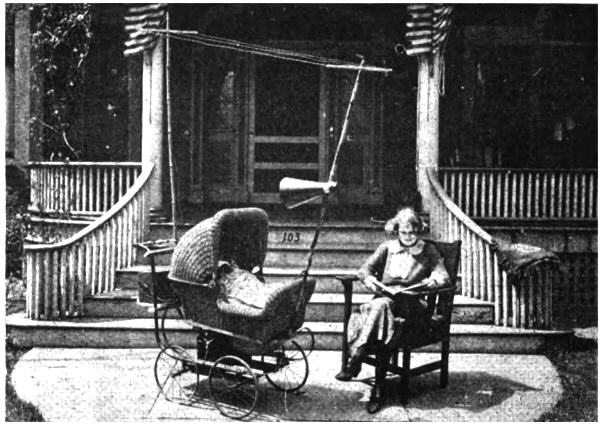
Portable Receiver Installed in a Baby Carriage

=== Broadcasting station WRL (1922–1924) ===
Initially there were no specific standards restricting which radio stations could conduct a broadcasting service, so it was permissible for stations holding an Amateur or Experimental license to make entertainment broadcasts. However, effective December 1, 1921, the U.S. Department of Commerce, which regulated radio at this time, formally established regulations defining a broadcasting station, setting aside two wavelengths — 360 meters (833 kHz) for entertainment, and 485 meters (619 kHz) for official weather and other government reports — and requiring that broadcasting stations had to hold a Limited Commercial license.

After the government started actively enforcing this ban, the college temporarily suspended broadcasting. However, after receiving "a request to broadcast the daily reports of the bureau of farms and markets", the Union College Radio Club decided to apply for one of the new broadcasting station licenses. On March 2, 1922 Union College was issued its first broadcasting license, with the randomly assigned call letters of WRL, authorizing use of the 360 meter entertainment wavelength. An expanded series of broadcasts followed, including vesper services in April, and a series of special transmissions during the College's 126th Commencement exercises in June.

However, the initial enthusiasm for broadcasting soon waned, and the Radio Club's focus returned to experimental work, including two-way shortwave communication across the Atlantic using its Experimental station 2XQ. On November 11, 1922, WRL was used to broadcast a play-by-play recounting of the Union-Hamilton football game. But a report at the time noted that "Union has not been active in popular broadcasting this season, the students devoting their efforts to transoceanic tests." WRL's last license was allowed to expire on January 25, 1923, and the station was formally deleted from the government list of active stations on December 18, 1924.

=== "Carrier current" station UBS / UCRS / WRUC (beginning 1941) ===
After the closing of WRL, Union College did not operate a broadcasting station for the next 17 years. The resumption of broadcast activities was the result of the development of a new form of transmission system. In 1936, students at Brown University in Providence, Rhode Island developed the first campus-based carrier current radio station, initially called "The Brown Network". Carrier current stations employed very low powered AM transmitters, with their signals carried over wires, often running through steam tunnels, that linked together various buildings and dormitories. These transmission lines then fed the radio signals into a building's electrical wires, allowing radio receivers located close to the wires to pick up the transmissions. Because they were such low power, with their signals most commonly limited to a college campus plus the immediately adjoining neighborhoods, carrier current stations did not require a license from the Federal Communications Commission or qualify for officially assigned call letters.

The "carrier current" innovation soon spread to other college campuses, especially in the northeastern United States. In the fall of 1941, the Union College Radio Club founded its own carrier current station, transmitting on the AM band at 640 kHz, which went into operation on September 22, 1941 with College President Fox as the debut's featured speaker. The new station informally adopted the identifier "UBS" (for "Union Broadcasting System"), and initially provided service to just the North Campus and the fraternity Kappa Alpha Society, although this was later expanded to campus-wide. The Intercollegiate Broadcasting System (IBS) had been formed in February 1940, to coordinate activities between individual colleges and to solicit advertisers interested in sponsoring programs geared toward college students, and the Union College Radio Club became a member of IBS on December 28, 1941.

In 1939, the Union College Radio Workshop was formed to provide students with "practical radio experience". Initially the group worked in conjunction with General Electric, gaining experience in radio programming production at that company's experimental FM station, W2XOY, and its shortwave stations, WGEO and WGEA. In mid-1942 the Radio Workshop group merged with the Radio Club, forming the Union College Radio Society. Reflecting this change, the carrier current station now became known as the "U.C.R.S. Network", boasting a staff of twenty-five students, with studios located in the college's Electrical Engineering building.

In early 1947, as a result of a contest, the station's identification was changed to "WRUC", standing for "Radio Union College". In 1948, the normal operating schedule was daily from 7 a.m. to 9:15 a.m. and 7 p.m. to 1 a.m., and the station was described as an "educational experience in the operation of a model broadcast station" that also provided "for all students the programs they wish to hear".

By 1963, the carrier current station had fallen silent, with its equipment in disrepair. Restoring operations was taken on as a project by Richard Ferguson and Jeffrey Hedquist, and after being revived it was again operated as a commercial station, eventually programming a high-energy Top 40 format similar to WABC in New York City. Operating hours were expanded to 18 hours a day. In the summer of 1966, a telephone line was used to transmit the programs to nearby Skidmore College, where for a time a second carrier current facility rebroadcast the programs for that campus.

== FM station WRUC ==
Although FM broadcasting stations were licensed in the United States beginning in 1941, it took many decades for FM band listenership to match the popularity of AM band stations. In order to help develop the FM band, the Federal Communications Commission (FCC) authorized the licensing of "Class D" educational stations, which were inexpensive to establish, because they operated with a Transmitter Power Output (TPO) of only 10 watts. WRUC was first licensed in 1975, to the "Trustees of Union College in the Town of Schenectady in the State of New York", as a Class D station on 90.9 FM, now officially assigned the WRUC call letters. In 1983, the transmitting frequency was changed to 89.7 and the power increased to 100 watts, the minimum to qualify as a "Class A" station.

== Priority status ==
WRUC refers to itself as "The First Station In The Nation", and this slogan has been consistently adopted by Union College's various broadcasting endeavors.

Union College's claim of priority was made as early as 1922, initially for its broadcasting station, WRL. At this time KDKA in Pittsburgh, Pennsylvania, which began broadcasting under the Special Amateur call sign of 8ZZ on November 2, 1920, was widely said to be "the first broadcasting station". WRL supporters countered that WRL's predecessor station, 2ADD, was "the first one to regularly broadcast musical programs", and because 2ADD's October 14, 1920 start was three weeks prior to KDKA's, therefore WRL should be considered the true pioneer broadcaster.

WRL ceased operations in 1924, so WRUC's current primacy claim requires stringing together a series of subsequent Union College broadcasting operations, starting on the AM and ending on the FM band, that begins with a standard amateur station (2ADD, 1920), followed by an Experimental station (2XQ, 1921), an AM broadcasting station (WRL, 1922-1924), then — after a 17-year gap when there was no organized broadcasting conducted at the College — an unlicensed commercial AM carrier current facility (UBS / UCRS / WRUC (beginning 1941)), and finally, beginning in 1975, a licensed non-commercial FM station, now with WRUC call letters officially assigned by the FCC.

The existence of the 1924-1941 gap, plus the need to combine several different broadcasting operations, makes the assertion that WRUC (FM) is a direct continuation of 2ADD problematical. In a review titled "Broadcasting's Oldest Stations", which appeared in the Winter 1977 issue of the Journal of Broadcasting, authors Joseph E. Baudino and John M. Kittross listed WRUC as one of the stations that they had quickly eliminated from consideration, including it in a group that didn't meet "enough of the requirements to be serious claimants within the bounds of this discussion".

Moreover, even in 1922 there were a number of stations in the United States with traditions that their broadcasting histories predated both WRL and KDKA.

Charles "Doc" Herrold, in San Jose, California, began test transmissions in 1909, which were followed by weekly concerts beginning in 1912. Herrold's broadcasts were suspended due to the World War I prohibition of civilian radio stations, and he did not return to the airwaves until May 1921. His experimental station was relicensed in December 1921 as KQW, which later moved to San Francisco and changed its call letters to KCBS in 1949. Program schedules for KQW appearing in 1925 included the slogan "Pioneer Broadcasting Station of the World", and in 2009 KCBS celebrated its 100th birthday with a yearlong series of events throughout the Bay Area, including the public dedication of a plaque commemorating the "Centennial Celebration of the World's First Broadcasting Station".

Around April 1920 the "California Theater Station" in San Francisco, originally under an Experimental license as 6XC, inaugurated a wide-ranging selection of daily broadcasts. The next year inventor Lee de Forest wrote that this was the "first radio-telephone station devoted solely" to broadcasting to the public. The station was relicensed as KZY late in 1921, then deleted in early 1923.

Beginning in August 1920, the Detroit News began daily broadcasts under an Amateur license as 8MK, highlighted by election returns broadcast on August 31, 1920. In 1921 the newspaper received a broadcasting license, as WBL, which a few months later changed to its current call letters, WWJ.

Among educational institutions, Grove City College in Grove City, Pennsylvania began regular radio concerts in March 1920. In 1922 the College received a broadcasting license, WSAJ, which celebrated its 50th anniversary in April 1970, six months before WRUC. The AM broadcasting station was deleted in 2006, however, the College continues to operate WSAJ-FM. In addition, the Radio Club at Carnegie Institute of Technology (now Carnegie Mellon University) in Pittsburgh, Pennsylvania broadcast a series of dance music broadcasts in May 1920. Carnegie established its own carrier current station, "WRCT", in 1949, and added an FM station with the same call letters in 1974.
