= Carrier current =

Transmission of low-power radio signals through electrical conductors

Carrier current transmission, originally called wired wireless, employs guided low-power radio-frequency signals, which are transmitted along electrical conductors. The transmissions are picked up by receivers that are either connected to the conductors, or a short distance from them. Carrier current transmission is used to send audio and telemetry to selected locations, and also for low-power broadcasting that covers a small geographical area, such as a college campus. The most common form of carrier current uses longwave or medium wave AM radio signals that are sent through existing electrical wiring, although other conductors can be used, such as telephone lines.

== Technology ==
Carrier current generally uses low-power transmissions. In cases where the signals are being carried over electrical wires, special preparations must be made for distant transmissions, as the signals cannot pass through standard utility transformers. Signals can bridge transformers if the utility company has installed high-pass filters, which is typically done when carrier current-based data systems are in operation. Signals can also be impressed onto the neutral leg of the three-phase electric power system, a practice known as "neutral loading", in order to reduce or eliminate mains hum (60 hertz in North American installations), and to extend effective transmission line distance.

For a broadcasting installation, a typical carrier current transmitter has an output in the range 5 to 30 watts. However, electrical wiring is a very inefficient antenna, and this results in a transmitted effective radiated power of less than one watt, and the distance over which signals can be picked up is usually less than 60 meters (200 feet) from the wires. Transmission sound quality can be good, although it sometimes includes the low-frequency mains hum interference produced by the alternating current. However, not all listeners notice this hum, nor is it reproduced well by all receivers.

Extensive systems can include multiple unit installations with linear amplifiers and splitters to increase the coupling points to a large electrical grid (whether a campus, a high-rise apartment or a community). These systems would typically require coaxial cable interconnection from a transmitter to the linear amplifiers.

== Initial development ==
The ability for electrical conductors to act as waveguides for radio signals was noted in the earliest days of radio experimentation, and Heinrich Hertz published the first review of the phenomenon in 1889. By 1911, Major General George Owen Squier was conducting some of the earliest studies designed to put carrier current transmissions, which he called "wired wireless", to practical use. To be effective, the radio transmitter must be capable of generating pure continuous-wave AM transmissions. Thus, the technology needed to set up carrier current transmissions would not be readily available until the late 1910s, with the development of vacuum tube transmitters and amplifiers.

== Long-distance communication ==
The first commercial applications of carrier current technology included the setting up of long-distance telegraph, telemetry, and telephone communication by electrical companies over their high-voltage distribution lines. This approach had a major advantage over standard telegraph and telephone lines, because radio signals can readily jump over any small gaps in cases when there is a line break. In May 1918, the Imperial Japanese Electro-Technical Laboratory of Tokyo successfully tested "wave telephony" over the Kinogawa Hydro-Electric Company's 144-kilometer (90-mile) long power line. In the summer of 1920, a successful test transmission over 19.2 kilometers (12 miles) of high-tension wires was reported from New Jersey, and by 1929, 1,000 installations had been made in the United States and Europe. The majority of power line communication installations use transmissions in the longwave band, to avoid interference to and from standard AM stations.

== Home entertainment services ==
=== United States ===
In 1923, in Staten Island, New York, the Wired Radio Service Company, a subsidiary of the local electric company, set up a subscription news and entertainment service at that used carrier current transmissions over the electrical power lines. To receive the transmissions, subscribers had to lease a receiver costing between two and five dollars a month. However, despite the power company's optimism that the system would eventually be installed nationally, the effort proved unable to compete with the free offerings provided by standard radio stations. General Squier continued to unsuccessfully promote the technology for home entertainment, until 1934, when he helped found the Muzak company, which focused on the business market.

=== Europe ===
Carrier current home entertainment services would prove to be more popular in Europe. Previously, there had been a few successful telephone newspaper services, which sent entertainment to subscribers over standard telephone lines. However, carrier current transmissions had the ability to provide programs over telephone lines without affecting the regular telephone service, and could also send multiple programs simultaneously.

In Germany, the carrier current service was called Drahtfunk, and in Switzerland Telefonrundspruch. In the Soviet Union, this approach was very common beginning in the 1930s because of its low cost and accessibility, and because it made reception of uncensored over-the-air transmissions more difficult. In Norway radiation from power lines was used, provided by the Linjesender facility. In Britain such systems were used for a time in areas where reception from conventional BBC radio transmitters was poor.

In these systems programs were fed by special transformers into the lines. To prevent uncontrolled propagation, filters for the service's carrier frequencies were installed in substations and at line branches. Systems using telephone wires were incompatible with ISDN which required the same bandwidth to transmit digital data. The German systems were discontinued in 1963 (West Germany) and 1966 (West Berlin), the Swiss system in 1998, and the Italian system (it:Filodiffusione) in 2023.

Programs formerly carried by "wire broadcasting" in Switzerland included:

- 175 kHz Swiss Radio International
- 208 kHz RSR1 "la première" (French)
- 241 kHz "classical music"
- 274 kHz RSI1 "rete UNO" (Italian)
- 307 kHz DRS 1 (German)
- 340 kHz "easy music"

== Low-power broadcasting stations ==
Carrier current technology is also used for broadcasting radio programs that can be received over a small area by standard AM radios. This is most often associated with college radio and high school radio, but also has applications for hospital radio stations and at military bases, sports stadiums, convention halls, mental and penal institutions, trailer parks, summer camps, office buildings, and drive-in movie theaters. Transmitters that use carrier current are very simple, making them an effective option for students interested in radio.

Carrier current broadcasting began in 1936, when students at Brown University in Providence, Rhode Island developed a carrier current station initially called "The Brown Network". This station was founded by George Abraham and David W. Borst, who had originally installed an intercom system between their dormitory rooms. The intercom links were first expanded to additional locations, and then the system was replaced by distributed low-powered radio transmitters, which fed their signals into various buildings' electrical wires, allowing nearby radio receivers to receive the transmissions.

The carrier current station idea soon spread to other college campuses, especially in the northeastern United States. The Intercollegiate Broadcasting System (IBS) was formed in February 1940, to coordinate activities between twelve college carrier current stations and to solicit advertisers interested in sponsoring programs geared toward their student audiences. The innovation received a major publicity boost by a complimentary article that appeared in the May 24, 1941 issue of The Saturday Evening Post, and eventually hundreds of college stations were established. Responding to the growing phenomenon, a 1941 release issued by the U.S. Federal Communications Commission (FCC) stated that because of the stations' very limited ranges, it had "not promulgated any rule governing their operation." Therefore, to operate legally, U.S. carrier current station broadcast emissions must adhere to the FCC's Title 47 CFR Part 15 Rules for unlicensed transmissions.

=== Educational institution carrier current and cablecast stations ===
Many college stations that went on to obtain FM broadcasting licenses started out as carrier current stations because of the low cost and relative ease of starting one. Although college-based carrier current stations have existed for over 80 years, their numbers are steadily declining, becoming supplemented, or replaced, by other transmission methods, including low-power FM (LPFM), closed circuit over cable TV channels, and Internet streaming audio and video, along with simple PowerPoint presentations of college campus news and information being streamed using low-cost consumer televisions and monitors. As with most other student-run facilities, these stations often operate on sporadic schedules.

In the United States, unlike educational FM stations, carrier current stations can carry a full range of advertising. Due to their low power, these stations do not require an FCC license, and are not assigned an official call sign. However, in keeping with standard radio industry practice, they commonly adopt their own call sign-like identifiers.

==== Existing stations ====
- Bulls Radio (1620 AM) at the University of South Florida in Tampa, Florida; also heard on licensed WMNF-HD2
- KAMP (1570 AM) at the University of Arizona in Tucson, Arizona
- KANM (1580 AM) at Texas A&M University in College Station, Texas
- KASR (1330 AM) at Arizona State University in Tempe, Arizona
- KDUP (1580 AM) at the University of Portland in Portland, Oregon
- KJACK (1680 AM) at Northern Arizona University in Flagstaff, Arizona
- KLBC (1610 AM) at Long Beach City College in Long Beach, California
- KMSC "Dragon Radio" (1500 AM) at Minnesota State University Moorhead in Moorhead, Minnesota
- KRFH at Humboldt State University in Arcata, California
- "K-ROCKS RadioOne" (1670 AM / 710 AM) in Casper, Wyoming
- KSSU (1580 AM) at California State University, Sacramento in Sacramento, California
- KUR (1670 AM / 88.3 FM) at Kutztown University of Pennsylvania in Kutztown, Pennsylvania
- KUTE (1620 AM) at the University of Utah
- Radio Laurier Macdonald (560 AM) at Laurier Macdonald High School in Saint-Leonard, Montreal, Quebec, Canada
- Radio SNHU (1620 AM) at Southern New Hampshire University
- Studio U (1710 AM) at the University of Oklahoma in Norman, Oklahoma
- UMSLRadio "The U" (1620 AM) at the University of Missouri–St. Louis in University City, Missouri
- WALT (1610 AM) at Davidson College in Davidson, North Carolina
- WERW (1670 AM) at Syracuse University in Syracuse, New York
- WGCC (650 AM) at Genesee Community College in Batavia, New York
- Wolfpack Radio (1700 AM) at the University of Nevada in Reno, Nevada
- WPPJ (670 AM) at Point Park University in Pittsburgh, Pennsylvania
- WPMD (1700 AM) at Cerritos College in Norwalk, California
- WQMC (1290 AM) at Queens College, City University of New York in Kew Gardens Hills, Queens
- WSIN (1590 AM) at Southern Connecticut State University in New Haven, Connecticut
- WSLU (1620 AM / 100.1 FM) at Saint Leo University in St. Leo, Florida
- WTBU (640 AM / 89.3 FM) at Boston University in Boston, Massachusetts

==== Former stations ====
- "Brown Student Radio" at Brown University in Providence, Rhode Island — now WBRU
- CBR/WVBR at Cornell University in Ithaca, New York — now WVBR-FM
- KAL at the University of California—Berkeley in Berkeley, California — now KALX
- KARL-AM at Carleton College in Northfield, Minnesota — now KRLX
- KASR at Arizona State University in Tempe, Arizona — now internet-only "Blaze Radio"
- "K.C. AM" at Colby College in Waterville, Maine — now WMHB
- KCAT at Central Washington State College in Ellensburg, Washington — now KCWU
- KCC at Chabot College in Hayward, California — now KCRH
- KCCS at the University of Missouri in Columbia, Missouri — supplanted by KCOU
- KCD at the University of California—Davis in Davis, California — now KDVS
- KCIZ at Mora High School in Mora, Minnesota
- KDSC/KDSU at North Dakota State University in Fargo, North Dakota — now KDSU
- KFRH at Washington University in St. Louis in St. Louis, Missouri — now KWUR
- KHSC at Humboldt State College in Arcata, California — now KHSU
- KMPS-AM at University of Alaska Fairbanks in Fairbanks, Alaska — now KSUA
- KNAB at Chapman University in Orange, California — now internet-only "ChapmanRadio.com"
- KNMA at New Mexico State University in Las Cruces, New Mexico
- KOWL at Rice University in Houston, Texas — later KHVU, now KTRU-LP
- KPCR-AM at Pomona College in Claremont, California – replaced by KSPC
- KRLK at Rio Linda High School in Rio Linda, California — now KRIO
- KRS at the Manhattan Project at Los Alamos, New Mexico — later KRSN
- KBIL/KSLU at Saint Louis University in St. Louis, Missouri — now internet-only "KSLU"
- KSU at Stanford University in Stanford, California – now KZSU
- KSUB at Seattle University in Seattle, Washington — now KXSU-LP
- KSWC at Southwestern College in Winfield, Kansas — now KSWC-LP
- KUCB at University of Colorado Boulder in Boulder, Colorado — now KVCU
- MD2/KTTC at Texas Tech College in Lubbock, Texas — now KTXT-FM
- KUOK at University of Kansas in Lawrence, Kansas — now KJHK
- KVUC at Union College in Lincoln, Nebraska — now KUCV
- "Radio Western" at the University of Western Ontario in London, Ontario, Canada — now CHRW-FM
- WAMU at American University in Washington, D.C. — now WAMU
- WBAU at Adelphi University in Garden City, New York — became now-defunct station WBAU
- WBMB at Baruch College/City University of New York in New York City
- WBSC at Bloomsburg State College in Bloomsburg, Pennsylvania — now WHSK
- WCAR at University of North Carolina at Chapel Hill — now WXYC
- WCCT/WNTC at Clarkson College of Technology/SUNY Potsdam in Potsdam, New York — now WTSC-FM
- WCHP and WINO/WRFX at Central Michigan University in Mount Pleasant, Michigan
- WCPR-AM 740 at Stevens Institute of Technology in Hoboken, New Jersey https://wcpr.org
- WCXQ in Isabela, Puerto Rico — now WCXQ-LP
- WDBS at Duke University in Durham, North Carolina — now WXDU
- WDCR/WESB at the University of Dayton in Dayton, Ohio — now WUDR
- WDGN at Downers Grove North High School in Downers Grove, Illinois — now WDGC-FM
- WECB 640 AM at Emerson College, Boston MA, now internet only
- WERC at The University of Toledo in Toledo, Ohio — now WXUT
- WERU at Embry–Riddle Aeronautical University in Daytona Beach, Florida — now WIKD-LP
- WEXP at La Salle University in Philadelphia, Pennsylvania — now internet-only
- WFAL at Bowling Green State University in Bowling Green, Ohio — now WFAL Falcon Radio
- WFIB at the University of Cincinnati in Cincinnati, Ohio
- WFRS at Ferris State College in Big Rapids, Michigan
- WFVS at Fort Valley State University in Fort Valley, Georgia — later WFVS-LP, now WFVS-FM
- WGBC at State University of New York at Geneseo in Geneseo, New York
- WHAT at Johns Hopkins University in Baltimore, Maryland — later WHSR, now WJHU
- WHEN/WDRB at the University of Delaware in Newark, Delaware — now WVUD
- WHEN at Western Illinois University in Macomb, Illinois — now WIUS
- WHRM at Hiram College in Hiram, Ohio — now internet-only "The Bark"
- WHUS at University of Connecticut in Storrs, Connecticut — now WHUS
- WJHU at Johns Hopkins University in Baltimore, Maryland — now WJHU
- WJJC at the John Jay College of Criminal Justice/City University of New York in New York City
- WCBN/WJJX at the University of Michigan in Ann Arbor, Michigan — now WCBN-FM
- WJPZ at Syracuse University in Syracuse, New York — now WJPZ-FM
- WJRH at Lafayette College in Easton, Pennsylvania — now WJRH
- WJTB at New Jersey Institute of Technology, in Newark, New Jersey — now internet-only "wjtbradio.com"
- WKC at Knox College in Galesburg, Illinois — now WVKC
- WKCO at Kenyon College in Gambier, Ohio — now WKCO
- WKDT at United States Military Academy in West Point, New York — now internet-only
- WMAX/WXDT at Drexel University in Philadelphia, Pennsylvania — now WKDU
- WKSR at Kent State University in Kent, Ohio — now internet-only "Black Squirrel Radio"
- WCDW/WLCR at Camp Shaw-Mi-Del-Eca in Lewisburg, West Virginia, operated by summer camp attendees
- WHMA/WLHA at University of Wisconsin–Madison in Madison, Wisconsin — now internet-only "Lakeshore 64 WLHA"
- WLHD (East Green) and WSGR (South Green) at Ohio University in Athens, Ohio — supplanted by "ACRN: The Rock Lobster", now internet-only
- WLKR at Lake Superior State University in Sault Ste. Marie, Michigan — now WLSO
- WLRN at Lehigh University in Bethlehem, Pennsylvania
- WMAX at Mount Washington College in Manchester, New Hampshire
- WMCR at Monmouth College in Monmouth, Illinois
- WMIB at Manchester College in North Manchester, Indiana
- WMIT at the Massachusetts Institute of Technology in Cambridge, Massachusetts — now WMBR
- WMSN at Michigan State University in East Lansing, Michigan; networked with WBRS (Brody Hall), WKME (Shaw Hall), WEAK (Wonders Hall), WMCD (McDonnell Hall), and WFEE (Fee Hall) — supplanted by WDBM
- WMUC at University of Maryland, College Park in College Park, Maryland — now WMUC-FM
- WNYU at New York University in Lower Manhattan — now WNYU-FM
- WOBC at Otterbein College/Otterbein University in Westerville, Ohio - Now WOBN-FM
- WOCR, a "pirate" carrier current station in Ocean City, Maryland
- WOLF at North Carolina State University in Raleigh, North Carolina — now WKNC-FM
- WOMB at Franconia College (closed 1978) in Franconia, New Hampshire
- WPSM at Penn State—McKeesport in McKeesport, Pennsylvania — now internet-only "WMKP"
- WQAD/WFQR/WIN/WIUS at Indiana University in Bloomington, Indiana — now WIUX-LP
- WRAF at Binghamton University in Binghamton, New York — now WHRW
- WRCC at Rockland Community College in Ramapo, New York
- WRCK at Slippery Rock University of Pennsylvania in Slippery Rock, Pennsylvania - later WRSK, then WSRU
- WRCR at Rockford College in Rockford, Illinois — revived as internet-only in 2011, ceased operations in 2017
- WRCT at Carnegie Mellon University in Pittsburgh, Pennsylvania — now WRCT
- WRFX at Central Michigan University in Mount Pleasant, Michigan
- WRGW at George Washington University in Washington, D.C. — now internet-only
- "WRIU Studio B" at University of Rhode Island in Kingston, Rhode Island — now internet-only
- WRLC at Rutgers University—Livingston in Piscataway, New Jersey — now WVPH
- WRPS at SUNY Potsdam in Potsdam, New York — later WAIH
- WRSU at Rutgers University in New Brunswick, New Jersey — now WRSU-FM
- WRUB at State University of New York at Buffalo — defunded and closed in 2019
- WRUC at Union College in Schenectady, New York — now WRUC
- WRUR at University of Rochester in Rochester, New York — now WRUR-FM
- WSAC at Saint Anselm College in Goffstown, New Hampshire
- WSCS/WCUR at West Chester University in West Chester, Pennsylvania — now WCUR
- WSMC at St. Mary's College in St. Mary's, Maryland
- WSND at the University of Notre Dame in Notre Dame, Indiana — now WSND-FM
- WSOE at Milwaukee School of Engineering in Milwaukee, Wisconsin — now WMSE
- WSUA at State University of New York at Albany-now WCDB.
- WTAS at Hope College in Holland, Michigan — now WTHS
- WTGR at Memphis State University in Memphis, Tennessee — now WYXR
- WTMC at the Boston Housing Authority's Bromley-Heath Housing Project in Jamaica Plain, Massachusetts
- WUCB at the University of Chicago in Chicago, Illinois, now WHPK
- WUFI at Florida International University in Miami, Florida —now WRGP
- WUSB at Stony Brook University in Stony Brook, New York — now WUSB (FM)
- WUVA at University of Virginia in Charlottesville, Virginia — now WCVL-FM
- WUVT at Virginia Tech in Blacksburg, Virginia — now WUVT-FM
- WVAT at SUNY Alfred State in Alfred, New York — later WETD
- WVAU at American University in Washington, D.C. — now internet-only
- WVBU at Bucknell University in Lewisburg, Pennsylvania — now WVBU-FM
- WVCW at Virginia Commonwealth University in Richmond, Virginia — now WVCW
- WVOF at Fairfield University in Fairfield, Connecticut — now WVOF
- WVRW at Michigan Technological University in Houghton, Michigan — now WMTU-FM
- WVYC at York College of Pennsylvania in York, Pennsylvania — now WVYC
- WWRC at Rider College in Lawrenceville, New Jersey — now WRRC
- WWSU at Wright State University in Dayton, Ohio
- WVW/WOUX/WOU at Oakland University in Rochester Hills, Michigan — now WXOU
- WXPN and WQHS at the University of Pennsylvania in Philadelphia, Pennsylvania — now WXPN and internet-only "WQHS Radio"
- WYBC at Yale University in New Haven, Connecticut — supplanted by an unrelated WYBC (AM) in 1998

== See also ==
- Power-line communication
- Leaky feeder
