= WLSO =

Radio station in Sault Ste. Marie, Michigan

Coordinates: 46.492°N 84.363°W

Laker Radio

Sault Ste. Marie, Michigan; United States
- Broadcast area
- Frequency: Online(formerly at 90.1 FM)
- Branding: Laker Radio

Programming
- Format: college radio, adult album alternative
- Affiliations: Live365

Ownership
- Owner: Lake Superior State University

History
- First air date: 1991 (carrier current); 1993 (FM); 2016 (online)
- Call sign meaning: Lake SuperiOr

Technical information
- Class: A
- ERP: 100 watts

Links
- Website: Laker Radio

Laker Radio is an internet radio station in Sault Ste. Marie, Michigan, United States. WLSO is the campus radio station of the city's Lake Superior State University, and also provides mobile DJ services for on-campus and Sault Ste. Marie events. From 1993 to 2017, the station broadcast at 90.1 on the FM dial with the call sign WLSO, before becoming solely an internet radio station during the 2016–2017 school year.

The station originally launched in 1991 under the unofficial callsign WLKR, as an AM carrier current station broadcasting exclusively to the LSSU campus. After receiving a broadcasting license from the Federal Communications Commission, the station launched on FM in 1993, when they adopted the WLSO call sign. Following a listener contest earlier that year, WLSO rebranded as The 46th Parallel Radio in August 2016, and launched a new internet streaming format through the Intercollegiate Broadcasting System and Backbone Networks. Lake Superior State University relinquished its FCC license as of November 2, 2017, having already taken the 90.1 FM signal dark earlier that year, with most social media accounts ceasing updates in the process.

In the fall of 2019, The 46th Parallel Radio's Instagram and Twitter pages resumed active posting after a 3-year hiatus, promoting on-campus events and an impending search for new DJs. In March 2021, the station rebranded again to Laker Radio, and closed their Backbone Networks station in favor of a brand new internet station via Live365.

While largely a freeform college radio station, The 46th Parallel has traditionally featured student DJs hosting their own programs and custom playlists, as well as school faculty and non-students at times. General music rotation on WLSO leaned towards experimental, indie, and electronic in its later years on FM, while the station has also aired Lake Superior State Lakers games and coverage in the past. Central Michigan University in Mount Pleasant also simulcasts their own radio station to the Sault Ste. Marie market at WCMZ-FM, though they air a public radio and jazz format.

== Studio ==
Laker Radio's studios were located in the basement of the Cisler Center. The studio was moved there from Brady Hall in 2006 to be more visible in the campus community and easier to access by students. The studio consisted of management offices, a recording booth, and the on-air broadcast studio.

The station broadcast 24 hours a day, 7 days a week year-round.

== Transmitter ==
The station's transmitter site was moved in October 2007. It was formerly located in the old studio, in the east basement of Brady Hall. It was relocated to another location in Brady Hall where it was re-engineered and re-built.

Laker Radio operated two transmitters. The primary transmitter was a R.V.R. TEX-300-LCD installed in March 2008. The original, a backup transmitter, consisted of a Bext TEX-20-NV exciter and a separate Bext PJ-200 power amplifier. The station's antenna system was on the roof of Brady Hall. It was a 2-bay circularly-polarized radiator. Programming was sent to the transmission site utilizing the Tele-Link Studio Transmitter Link (STL) from Energy-Onix.

Laker Radio utilized Sine System's Remote Facilities Controller (RFC-1) at the transmitter site. It allowed for remote and automatic controls, system monitoring and acted as an alarm system calling station engineers immediately in the event of a system fault. Laker Radio's RFC-1 monitored 24 channels of telemetry and logged all data though GetTelemetry software.

Laker Radio also used an Orban Optimod 8200-FM audio processor connected to a controlling computer at the transmitter. Laker Radio's air signal was continually monitored by an Inovonics FM modulation analyzer model 531 and received audio was sent back to the studio to be checked. All equipment was protected through a Polyphazor lighting-arrestor and several back-up power supplies, which allowed uninterrupted broadcasts and relaying notifications from the Emergency Alert System (EAS) to the community in the event of a power disruption or other emergency.
