= WFAL =

WFAL may refer to:

- WFAL (FM), a radio station (105.9 FM) licensed to serve Milner, Georgia, United States
- WFAL Falcon Radio, an internet and cable TV only radio station at Bowling Green University
- WFLJ, a radio station (89.3 FM) licensed to serve Frostproof, Florida, United States, which held the call sign WFAL in 2009
- WGRX, a radio station (104.5 FM) licensed to serve Falmouth, Virginia, United States, which held the call sign WFAL-FM from 1998 to 2001
- WHYA, a radio station (101.1 FM) licensed to serve Mashpee, Massachusetts, United States, which held the call sign WFAL from 1984 to 1995
