= Bartholomay =

Bartholomay is a surname. Notable people with the surname include:

- Anthony Bartholomay (1919–1975), American mathematician
- Henry Bartholomay (1945–2015), American naval aviator
- Nathan Bartholomay (born 1989), American pair skater
- William Bartholomay (1928–2020), American business executive
