= WRCR (Illinois) =

- United States
- Broadcast area: Rockford College
- Frequency: 640 kHz

Programming
- Format: Freeform
- Affiliations: Intercollegiate Broadcasting System

Ownership
- Owner: Rockford College Student Government

History
- First air date: March 17, 1963
- Last air date: 1995
- Call sign meaning: Rockford College Radio

Links
- Website: www.wrcr.radiohistory.net

WRCR was a carrier current college radio station at Rockford College, Rockford, Illinois. It was conceived by a group of students in the fall of 1962. On December 20, 1962, the establishment of a radio station on campus was approved by Rockford College Board of Trustees. The executive board of Rockford College Student Government recognized WRCR as a communications medium on February 5, 1963, and WRCR began regular carrier current broadcasting on March 17, 1963, from room 206 in Nelson Hall.

In the Fall of 1964, WRCR moved to a larger space on the first floor of Burpee Center. Then in the Fall of 1970 the station moved to custom designed studios in the lower level of the new Burpee Center addition. In 1985 the college needed the space in lower Burpee and WRCR was again on the move. The new location was three rooms in the former Lang Infirmary. By 1993 as the college population changed from primarily residential to half-commuter student body, it became more and more difficult to staff the radio station. WRCR ceased broadcasting in the Spring of 1995.

Among the students broadcasting on WRCR in the 1960s was Henry "Bart" Bartholomay. Bartholomay was part of a History Channel program: "MIG Killers of Midway".

In the 1969 Fall semester, an Evening College class was offered called "Intro to Radio & Radio Broadcasting. The class was taught by Frank Tavares. Today Tavares teaches broadcast management, media production, advertising, and marketing at Southern Connecticut State University. For 31 years Tavares was the voice on most National Public Radio funding announcements at the end of programs. He left the position January 1, 2014.

On January 21, 2011, broadcasting returned to the Rockford College Campus via a Live365 stream of Rockford College Radio. It is streamed on the internet 24 hours a day and can be found on Facebook. It was reopened and was managed by Vince Chiarelli of the Vince Chiarelli Band until his graduation in 2014. Management of the station was handled by Matt Hagen until Spring 2017 when he graduated and Peter Berry took over.

By the Fall of 2017, WRCR/Rockford College Radio ended streaming and ceased operation. Its future remains uncertain.

== See also ==
- Campus radio
- List of college radio stations in the United States
