= WRRC =

- Lawrenceville, New Jersey; United States
- Broadcast area: Trenton, New Jersey
- Frequency: 107.7 MHz
- Branding: 107.7 The Bronc

Programming
- Format: freeform

Ownership
- Owner: Rider University; (Board of Trustees of Rider College)
- Sister stations: WRRC2 (107.7 The Bronc Retro)

History
- First air date: November 1, 1962 (as WRCR)
- Former call signs: WRCR, WWRC

Technical information
- Licensing authority: FCC
- Facility ID: 6109
- Class: D
- ERP: 20 watts
- HAAT: 11 meters (36 feet)
- Transmitter coordinates: 40°16′44.00″N 74°44′15.00″W

Links
- Public license information: Public file; LMS
- Website: www.1077thebronc.com

WRRC (107.7 FM, 107.7 The Bronc) is a college FM radio station in Lawrenceville, New Jersey, serving the students of Rider University. It is the broadcast outlet for Rider University Men's and Women's basketball, as well as Burlington County and Mercer County High School football and baseball.

== Station history ==
The radio station originally went on air November 1, 1962, as WRCR, and was located at 640 AM on the dial, broadcasting via carrier current. A student, Ira Kinder, and the director of the college's audio/video department, Gordon Graves, founded the station.

In 1965, the station changed its call letters from WRCR to WWRC, because a commercial station on the East Coast wanted the WRCR call letters. In exchange, WWRC received equipment from the commercial station.

In 1966, WWRC was moved to the basement of the Hill Dormitory, housing the on-air studio, production studio, record library and two offices.

In 1971, WWRC moved to the Student Center building where the Communication Department first began to use the radio station for broadcasting classes. During this time the station operated as a commercial station, programming a news and popular rock format within the campus. In 1984, the station changed its call letters to WRRC, again because another radio station wanted the WWRC call. At this time, the college station ceased broadcasting on carrier current and moved to the FM band at 88.5 MHz, sharing the frequency with student-run station WLSR, operated by the nearby Lawrenceville School.

By the mid-1980s the station was finally able to offer 24-hour programming after WLSR moved from 88.5. However, to ensure student safety, the college opted to lock the Student Center at night, preventing further overnight programming. After just a few weeks of full-time operations, WRRC returned to a shortened broadcast schedule.

On November 24, 1993, the station moved to its current dial position, 107.7 FM. In 2007, through the use of automated programming, the station resumed 24-hour programming, expanding the air schedule to a full-time schedule.

In 2008, the station hired current general manager John Mozes. WRRC-FM was nominated six years in a row for the National Association of Broadcasters (NAB) Marconi Radio Award for College Radio Station of the Year, winning the award in 2026. In 2023 WRRC was awarded "Best College Radio Station Under 10,000 Students" by the Intercollegiate Broadcasting System.

WRRC currently broadcasts a freeform format.

== See also ==
- List of college radio stations in the United States
