= WFAL Falcon Radio =

Internet radio station in Bowling Green, Ohio

- Bowling Green, Ohio; United States
- Broadcast area: Wood County, Ohio; Northwest Ohio; Worldwide
- Frequency: Online only
- Branding: WFAL Falcon Radio

Programming
- Format: College radio; Rock music; Alternative rock; Talk radio

Ownership
- Owner: Bowling Green State University

History
- Founded: 1970
- First air date: Fall 2008

Links
- Webcast: Listen live
- Website: falconradio.org

WFAL Falcon Radio is a commercial internet radio station run by students of Bowling Green State University in Bowling Green, Ohio, broadcasting exclusively online. WFAL Falcon Radio is overseen by faculty from Bowling Green State University's School of Mass Communications. In addition to being available online, the station is simulcast via cable radio throughout Northwestern Ohio on Spectrum Cable channel 21.

While operating as a commercial entity since 2008, the station is not licensed by the Federal Communications Commission (FCC) and has roots in a now-defunct unlicensed carrier current AM station that launched in 1970, from which the unofficial "WFAL" call sign was derived. Unlike licensed station WBGU (88.1 FM), which is also owned and operated by the university, WFAL Falcon Radio is primarily used for students wishing to pursue jobs in the radio and communications industry.

== History ==
What is today WFAL Falcon Radio had its origins as a pirate radio station in a BGSU dorm in the late 1960s. The university soon decided to make it a school-sponsored station and "WFAL" officially began broadcasting in 1970.

Over the next 20 years, the station was operated as a carrier current outlet, where a low power transmitter broadcast the signal via the campus telephone system's wiring, accessible on AM/FM radios within residence halls (and occasionally nearby) on the frequency AM 680. It reached its heyday during the mid 1980's following the relocation of the School of Mass Communications from South Hall to West Hall.

In the 1990s, the station became one of the top three college radio stations in the US and was awarded two awards by the National Association of College Broadcasters

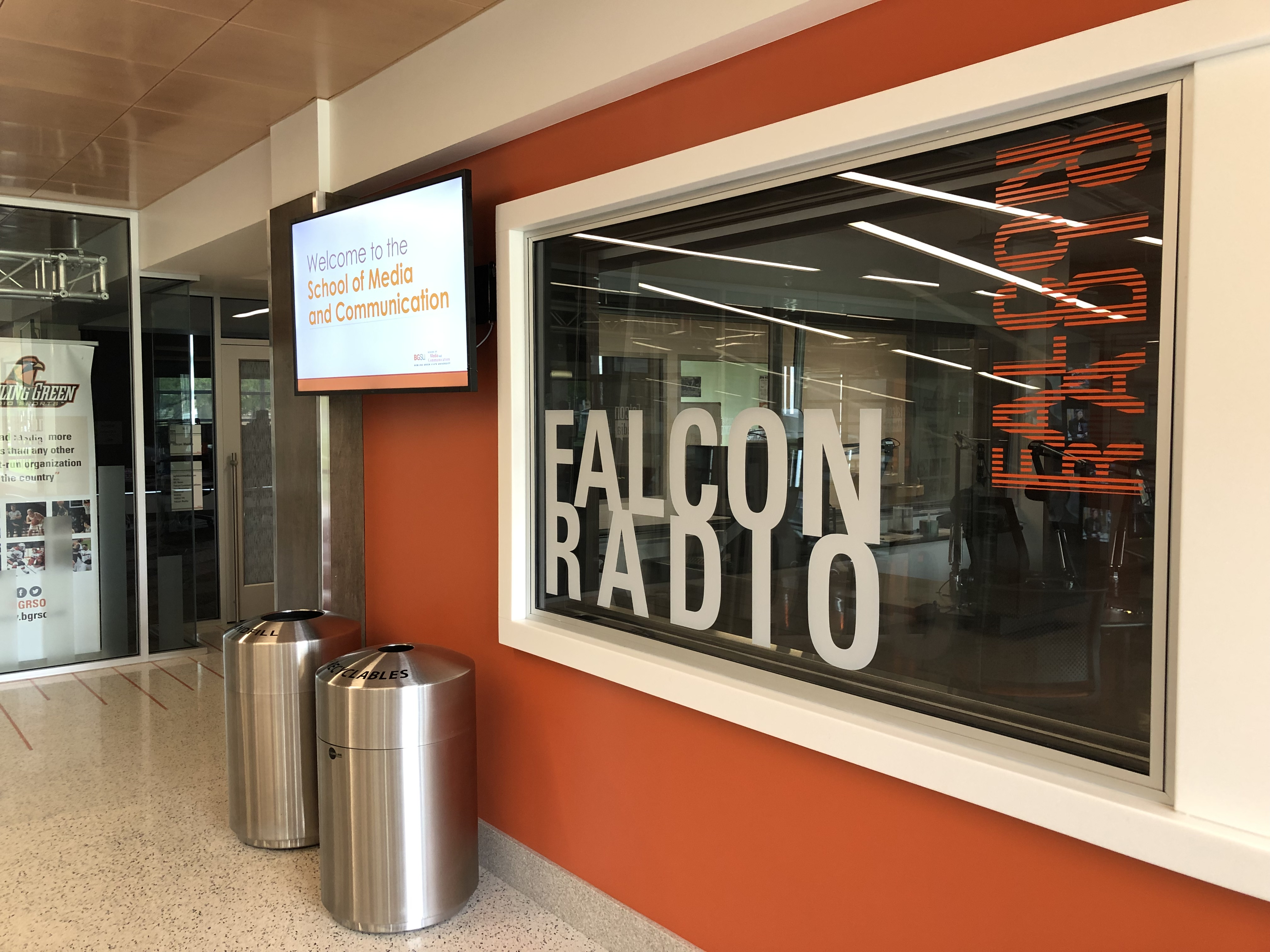
The WFAL recording studio

In 2008, BGSU increased funding for telecommunications, the station rebuilt the studio to make the station fully digital and add the latest equipment. The transformation included a new name and image and the station was renamed WFAL Falcon Radio. WFAL was previously known as WFAL 1610 AM until 2008 when, after problems with the transmitter being unable to broadcast at a legal range, it was decided for this station to become internet and cable TV only.

== Format ==
The station has gone through a variety of format changes including Top 40, AOR (album-oriented rock). The newest format consists of 5 genres departments: modern rock, Jazz, hip-hop, Talk and Top 40. The station has numerous shows during the day and also carries BGSU and local high school sporting events.
