= KWUR =

Radio station at Washington University in St. Louis

Coordinates: 38.649°N 90.308°W

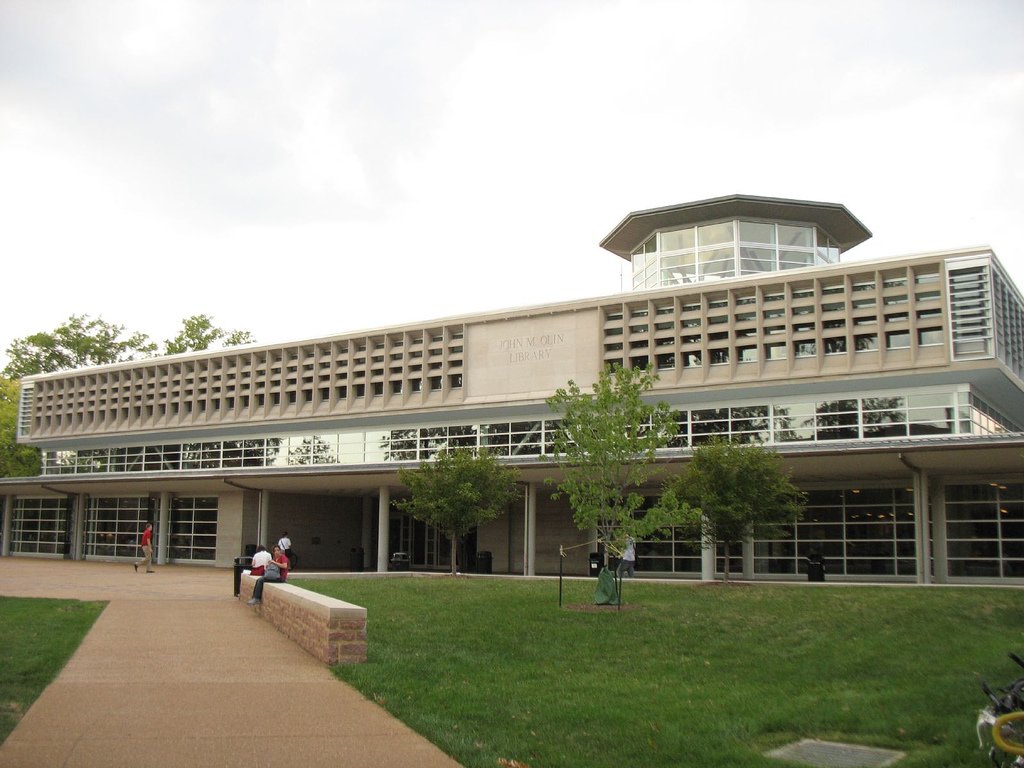
- KWUR's transmitter located at Olin Library
- Clayton, Missouri; United States
- Broadcast area: Greater St. Louis
- Frequency: 90.3 MHz

Programming
- Format: Freeform

Ownership
- Owner: Washington University in St. Louis

History
- First air date: July 4, 1976
- Call sign meaning: K Washington University Radio

Technical information
- Class: D
- ERP: 9 watts
- HAAT: 29 meters (95 ft)

Links
- Webcast: Listen live
- Website: kwur.wustl.edu

KWUR is a college radio station in Greater St. Louis, Missouri, located at 90.3 FM. KWUR was founded on July 4, 1976, at Washington University in St. Louis, and represents one of the last remaining independent and fully student-managed radio stations in the United States.

Commercial-free programming, including rock, surf-rock, garage-rock, hip-hop, punk, metal, world, goth-industrial, classical, reggae, jazz, blues, electronica, talk, experimental, and Washington University sports, represent KWUR's freeform format.

Although KWUR is only a class D FM station with a 9-watt effective radiated power (originally 10 watts), its location on the Washington University campus allows reception over the lively and focal Delmar Loop. Additionally, live Internet audio streaming supports a dedicated student, national, and global following. KWUR receives funding and support from the Washington University Student Union, the institution's undergraduate student government. KWUR is notable for fostering the St. Louis music scene through its initiatives including "Stack Sessions", where local and touring musicians are featured, as well as other community events, including KWUR Sucks and St. Louis Open Streets.

== History ==
KWUR roots go back to a small carrier current AM station, KFRH, serving the Forsyth Residence Halls at Washington University in St. Louis in 1961. In 1968, freshman Beau Harris single-handedly broadcast for over 136 consecutive hours establishing a new collegiate record and helping to increase the station's budget. KFRH ceased broadcasting in the spring of 1974 while its staff worked toward establishing an FM station. On July 4, 1976, KWUR 90.3 FM began broadcasting on the campus from a 10 watt transmitter atop a high-rise dormitory. The station made its name through shows like "Rock It", allegedly the first radio shows in St. Louis to play punk rock. The show's fans, known as "The Fun One Hundred" would gather around the station's parking lot on Friday nights, resulting in the first semblance of a St. Louis punk scene. At the time, campus student-published media (campus newspaper, arts publication, etc.) were controlled in a monopoly by a radical pro-Maoist communism campus group, which attacked the station in print as it had its own management not part of that group; the station kept its independence despite a campaign to bring it under group control. In 1991, in response to the lack of published music writing on campus, KWUR started producing a magazine titled Sample. Based at KWUR, Sample would become the outlet for record reviews and numerous interviews until its end in 1999. The magazine was revived in 2010 and is available for viewing on the official KWUR Website

In 1998, KWUR became one of the first college stations to offer a live online stream (at the time in RealAudio format). The now defunct Nibblebox.com, who were once the central body of college radio, gave KWUR nine awards for best shows in their respective timeslots. In 2003, KWUR won the critic's choice from the Riverfront Times for the Best Radio Station in St. Louis.

In 2001, KWUR began the latest of its periodic wattage upgrade campaigns, in the hopes of increasing its transmitting power to 100 watts (Previous upgrade campaigns occurred in 1989 and 1995.) The outcome of this campaign was the same as before: despite approval from the Federal Communications Commission (FCC) and commissioned technical studies showing there would be no interference with adjacent stations, KWUR was unable to get approval from its closest neighbor, NPR-affiliate KWMU.

In 2005, KWUR began a complete renovation of its studio and technology.

In 2006, KWUR began official rebroadcasts of Free Speech Radio News.

KWUR moved its operations to a newer space in the fall 2013 semester.

In the fall of 2015, the station revamped its "stack session" program, bringing in significantly more local artists and touring bands to play live on-air, and recorded sets for students, which eventually culminated in the "KWUR Sucks" series, a monthly showcase of diy local and national talent

== See also ==
- Campus radio
- List of college radio stations in the United States
