= WMHB =

- Waterville, Maine; United States
- Broadcast area: Kennebec Valley
- Frequency: 89.7 MHz
- Branding: WMHB 89.7FM

Programming
- Format: Eclectic

Ownership
- Owner: Mayflower Hill Broadcasting Corporation

History
- First air date: January 18, 1974
- Call sign meaning: W Mayflower Hill Broadcasting

Technical information
- Licensing authority: FCC
- Class: A
- Power: 110 watts
- HAAT: 32 meters
- Transmitter coordinates: 44.566°N 69.663°W

Links
- Public license information: Public file; LMS
- Website: wmhbradio.org

WMHB (89.7 FM) is the non-commercial College radio station of Colby College in Waterville, Maine, United States. WMHB is directed, managed, and staffed entirely by students. WMHB has been on air in one form or another since 1949. WMHB can be heard in Waterville, Winslow, Oakland, Fairfield and surrounding communities as well as on the Internet via its webcast.

== History ==
WMHB's beginnings originate to Radio Colby, a weekly radio show aired on WTVL, a Waterville AM radio station. Beginning in 1949, Radio Colby featured Colby news, trivia, and favorite new music. Much of the same type of material that was broadcast on the radio show is now available on the "Inside Colby" podcast, a production by the Colby College communications office. Radio Colby on WTVL would be discontinued in December 1957.

Given Radio Colby's popularity, students wished to further develop campus broadcasting. In the spring of 1955, Radio Colby went on air as 600 K.C. AM, a carrier current station. Being a carrier current station, the call letters were arbitrary, and KCAM referred to 'K Colby AM'. Students could listen in by attaching a cable from their radio to radiator pipes or ground wire of the electrical system. Broadcasting of the station originated in the veteran's apartments (temporary housing created for the returning World War II veterans) and could be heard on the eastern side of campus including the residences which were at the time fraternity houses. The veterans apartments were demolished in 1957, and Radio Colby went silent.

Radio Colby came back in 1964 on 610 kHz carrier current. Broadcasting from Roberts Union, the new station could be heard almost all around campus. Radio Colby began to develop from a novelty into more of a full-featured radio station, featuring both news and music. This increase in development led the station to apply for a 10-watt Class D Nonommercial FM license in 1973. Radio Colby incorporated as the Mayflower Hill Broadcasting Corporation, a separate entity from Colby College and governed completely by students.

In 1984, WMHB upgraded to 110 watts effective radiated power, increasing its radius from the immediate Waterville area to the surrounding communities and continued as a mainly on-campus feature, although community support began to grow over time.

In the mid-1990s WMHB began a new chapter in its existence. The station began to structure itself more like a public radio station rather than a campus club. These developments increased as time went on, and in January 2001, WMHB first began to stream its content on the Internet. Due to royalty battles, WMHB had to pull its webstream down shortly after, but WMHB re-instated webstreaming in 2002.

Over time the web became a major aspect of WMHB's listenership base, attracting listeners from all over the world as well as an increased number of Colby students. Beginning in the fall of 2007, station staff led a dramatic digital renovation. Previously, the Digital Millennium Copyright Act had prohibited WMHB from broadcasting online unless there was a live DJ in the studio to update playlist information, but the incorporation of a digital music library allowed WMHB's webcast to run twenty-four hours a day when no DJ was in the studio. In March 2007, WMHB was added to the iTunes radio tuner, as well as the radio tuners of Windows Media and TiVo.

Historically, WMHB has hostsed an annual food drive to support the Mid-Maine Homeless Shelter, once providing the single largest donation the shelter received each year. In December 2008, for the first time WMHB expanded the food drive to include a free holiday dinner for residents of the Waterville community.

Former logo

In the spring of 2009, WMHB debuted a new website, which features WMHB news, the schedule of station programming and a live DJ chat. During that same semester, WMHB hosted a live broadcast from Pulver Pavilion, Colby's student union, every Wednesday. Additional programming during this time period included a weekly on-air debate program that originated in the spring of 2009 as an extension of the Civil Discourse, a popular email forum utilized by Colby students to discuss current events. WMHB also used to broadcast major Colby athletic events, including games from the football, basketball, hockey, baseball, and softball teams.

== Present activity ==
Today, WMHB is still broadcasting at 110 watts of effective radiated power via an omnidirectional antenna with the support of nearly 20 staff and over 100 volunteer DJs from the Colby and Waterville communities. WMHB is funded from student allocated activity money and from the support of local businesses who underwrite WMHB programming. WMHB is currently a member of the Mid-Maine Chamber of Commerce, the Maine Association of Broadcasters, REMnet and the College Music Journal.

After an article published in The Colby Echo in 2017, student interest at WMHB increased once again. Alongside a boost of student involvement, the website received many changes and updates the following years, including the migration to the WordPress platform, reintegration of the news blog, schedule and programming integration with Creek, and an entirely new webcast system with Shoutcast. In 2020, WMHB adopted a newly revised constitution and for the first time in its history created a Diversity, Equity, and Inclusion Statement publicly available on their website.

== Station programming ==
WMHB broadcasts alternative music of all genres twenty-four hours a day and features live volunteer DJs between the hours of 6am and midnight. Most programming originates at WMHB's broadcast studio in the basement of Roberts Union, but WMHB frequently hosts live broadcasts from other locations on- and off-campus. As of 2019, all programming is scheduled through Creek and is available to the public on their website. To acquire new music, WMHB works with a number of promotional firms that in turn work with new and emerging artists, and WMHB staff submit charts to College Music Journal. During the summer, members of the Waterville community fill in for student show times and a student summer manager oversees the station's programming and maintenance.

In addition to music programming, WMHB also features some talk programming, including an Arts Spotlight Radio Show in collaboration with Waterville Creates, and The General Store Variety Show. In 2017, WMHB re-introduced remote broadcasting, and in collaboration with student programming and local businesses, is able to broadcast events remotely to their website as well as to their Facebook page. As of 2019, WMHB became an annual participant in College Radio Day and World College Radio Day.

== Influence ==
WMHB, like many other college stations, has a large influence on what music becomes mainstream. Artists like Lupe Fiasco, Norah Jones, Gnarls Barkley and even Avril Lavigne began their career on the college circuit before breaking into the mainstream. WMHB receives hundreds of requests for airplay every week, and music directors in each genre (alternative, roots, hip-hop, techno, world, jazz, and loud rock) sift through and review every CD and digital submission. Volunteer DJs then choose their playlists based on their own interests and the reviews of the music directors. WMHB has no specific on-air format but is a new music station, and DJs are required to play at least 50 percent new music, meaning that about half of their show must feature songs released in recent months.

== See also ==
- Campus radio
- List of college radio stations in the United States
