= KCWU =

Coordinates: 47.006°N 120.516°W

- Ellensburg, Washington; United States
- Frequency: 88.1 (MHz)
- Branding: 88.1 The Burg

Programming
- Format: College radio

Ownership
- Owner: Central Washington University

History
- First air date: 1958 (as carrier current)
- Former call signs: KCAT
- Call sign meaning: Central Washington University

Technical information
- Licensing authority: FCC
- Class: A
- ERP: 430 watts
- HAAT: −92 meters (−302 ft)

Links
- Public license information: Public file; LMS
- Website: www.881theburg.com

KCWU (formerly KCAT), also known as 88.1 The 'Burg, is the college radio station for Central Washington University based out of Ellensburg, Washington. The history of The 'Burg starts back in 1958 when small broadcast facility, KCAT, started broadcasting on 880 AM. The 'Burg, now KCWU, has expanded its broadcast facility. It now broadcasts 430 watts effective radiated power at a frequency of 88.1 MHz.

The 'Burg offers a wide variety of programming, including new college alternative rock (that is reported to CMJ), talk radio, and specialty shows during the night hours that feature spotlights on specific genres (they have shows highlighting electronica, hip-hop, world music, local northwest music, blues, heavy metal, punk rock, classic rock, reggae, singer/songwriter music and many other unique subgenres of rock).

== History ==
=== KCAT (1958–1998) ===
KCAT began transmitting on 880 AM in 1958 as a carrier current station. In 1962, The FCC granted the Central Washington College of Education Board of Trustees a non-commercial, educational FM broadcast license to operate KCWS, a 10-Watt FM Broadcast station. KCWS 91.5 FM signed on the air on April 29, broadcasting from the same building as KCAT 880 AM. Ten years later, Central Washington State College of Education lost its FM broadcast station. It was unpopular with most students due to its classical music and talk/documentary format . In 1973, KCAT AM broadcast facility moved to the Student Union Building, but it was destroyed in a fire in the Summer of 1976. In 1980, KCAT then switched from carrier current AM to and FM cable station, transmitting its signal through King Video Cable in Ellensburg. In April 1992, KCAT officially separated from the CWU Communications Department because of limited faculty and budget, and declining student interest in radio degrees. In March 1995, The CWU Service and Activities Fee Committee granted money to KCAT to once again facilitate the process of obtaining an FCC broadcast license.

On July 1, 1995, KCAT became an officially recognized department under the CWU Division of Student Affairs. KCAT obtained its Construction Permit on March 3, 1998, to build a 500-Watt, non-commercial educational FM broadcast station at 88.1 MHz, with tower site located at 1300 North Pfenning Road in Ellensburg. Two months later, KCAT was given the call letters "KCWU" by the FCC, to use once it signs over the air. The call letters were changed because "KCAT" already existed in Pine Bluff, Arkansas.

=== KCWU in the SUB (1998–2006) ===
On September 19, 1998, KCWU-FM began 24/7 live operation, under the leadership of General Manager Chris Hull. The Burg's first remote broadcast aired April 30, 1999 at noon from the gazebo at 4th and Pearl in downtown Ellensburg.

In October 2001, The 'Burg began the Fireside Chat broadcast series, featuring (for the first time in the station's history) live broadcasts from the CWU President's home once every quarter. The broadcast occurs before a live studio audience of CWU students, and is designed as an intimate forum for them to discuss and address their concerns and issues to the President and the four University Vice Presidents in a very informative Q&A format. In the same month, then Promotion Director Kevin Tighe began "Rock Night with The 'Burg" now known as "Alley Ice with The 'Burg", was implemented as a live music and contest broadcast from the local Rodeo Bowl bowling alley every Wednesday night from 9pm to Midnight.

=== KCWU in the SURC (2006–) ===
On March 6, 2006, The Burg temporarily suspended live talent as they transitioned into their state-of-the-art facility in the new SUB/Recreation Facility. On August 3, 2006, KCWU-FM began audio transmission from its new broadcast studios in the SURC. They also adapted for live radio streaming from their website, broadcasting worldwide.

In March 2015, KCWU was named 2015 Best College Radio Station (With enrollment of 10,000 students or more) by the Intercollegiate Broadcasting System at their 75th annual College Media Conference, held in New York City.

In March 2022, KCWU was named 2022 Best College Radio station (With enrollment of 10,000 students or more) by the Intercollegiate Broadcasting System at their 82nd annual College Media Conference, held in New York City (virtually). This is the second time KCWU had won this award.

== Program funding ==
The radio station is largely funded by fees paid by the Central Washington University student body and from local underwriting.

== See also ==
- Campus radio
- List of college radio stations in the United States
