= WVKC =

Coordinates: 40.946°N 90.370°W

- Galesburg, Illinois; United States
- Broadcast area: Galesburg, Illinois
- Frequency: 90.7 MHz
- Branding: Tri States Public Radio HD2: The Voice of Knox College

Programming
- Format: Public radio
- Subchannels: HD2: Freeform
- Affiliations: American Public Media, National Public Radio, Public Radio Exchange

Ownership
- Owner: Knox College
- Sister stations: WIUM, WIUW

History
- First air date: 1961
- Call sign meaning: Voice of Knox College

Technical information
- Licensing authority: FCC
- Class: A
- ERP: 580 watts
- HAAT: 31 meters (102 ft)

Links
- Public license information: Public file; LMS
- Website: https://www.tspr.org/ HD2: https://907wvkc.wixsite.com/thewvkc

WVKC (90.7 FM) is a 1,000-watt radio station in Galesburg, Illinois. Knox College is the station licensee, authorized by the Federal Communications Commission.

WVKC is a student-operated radio station of Knox College. The call letters were originally chosen to stand for "The Voice of Knox College", although that catchphrase is not in active use. WVKC was known as "Radio-Free Galesburg" until as recently as 2005, when students decided on "No Sale Radio," again emphasizing that WVKC is a non-commercial, not-for-profit organization. In 2006, students opted to change the name to simply "The Voice," a slogan used by the station in the 1970s and 1980s. WVKC now runs under the Tri-States Public Radio branding full time since 2013.

== Format ==
According to station lore, WVKC's official mascot is "Zippy the wonder bat." Though appearances are uncommon — usually occurring in the station's library — there are many bats living on the fourth floor of Knox's George Davis Hall, the same space that currently houses WVKC.

Any student is welcome to become a DJ, with no experience necessary, and are free to play music of any genre. Members from the community have also contributed to the on-air schedule, contributing rock, jazz, gospel, and latin formats.

The station also features live web broadcasting for remote listeners.

Despite being phased out in 2013 in exchange for a full-time public radio format. This Freeform format still exist through the web and a digital subchannel

== History ==
Founded as an experimental AM radio station in the 1920s. WVKC has been operating continuously for more than 50 years, making it one of the oldest college radio stations.

- December 1924 - Knox College first operates an experimental AM radio station, WFBZ, until 1928.
- 1950s - WKC (WVKC's direct predecessor) operated as a carrier current radio station, broadcasting to selected locations on campus.
- 1961 - WVKC (a fourth letter having been added by the call sign) was granted by the FCC for a Low power FM station on 90.5 MHz. This was a Class D station at 10 watts ERP.
- 1979 - Due to planned renovation and transfer to a developer of the station's location since 1961 (basement of Whiting Hall on W. Tompkins Street), the college granted the station space on the fourth floor of George Davis Hall (then vacant, and the original location of Knox's radio studio in the 1920s).
- 1980 - The station acquired a refurbished Collins transmitter and moved into the fourth floor of George Davis Hall. Along with new studios, the station's power was increased to 1,000 watts ERP.
- 1984 - Began broadcasting in stereo using a prototype Harris exciter.
- 1990 - In cooperation with the FCC and to accommodate an increase in ERP by Augustana College's WVIK at 90.3 MHz in the Quad Cities area, as well as reducing adjacent channel interference with WVIK, WVKC changed its FM frequency to 90.7 MHz.
- 2007 - WVKC entered into a partnership with Tri-States Public Radio to bring regular NPR programming to Galesburg radio market.
- 2013 - A 20-year management agreement was reached for Tri States Public Radio to operate Knox College’s student-run WVKC as a full-time NPR station for the Galesburg market. Knox College will retain its license to WVKC. Student programming will be distributed as an Internet-only stream and HD Radio channel. Tri States Public Radio is providing equipment and technical support to beef up the school’s capacity to deliver a high-quality audio stream
