= WCUR =

Radio station at West Chester University in West Chester, Pennsylvania

Coordinates: 39.9507°N 75.5991°W

West Chester, Pennsylvania; United States
- Broadcast area: West Chester-Philadelphia
- Frequency: 91.7 MHz

Programming
- Format: Freeform college radio

Ownership
- Owner: West Chester University Student Services Inc.

History
- First air date: September 1, 1999
- Call sign meaning: West Chester University Radio

Technical information
- Licensing authority: FCC
- Facility ID: 63564
- Class: A
- ERP: 100 watts
- HAAT: 34 meters

Links
- Public license information: Public file; LMS
- Webcast: Listen Live
- Website: wcur.org

WCUR (91.7 FM, "The Curve") is the student radio station at West Chester University (WCU) in West Chester, Pennsylvania, United States. It serves a limited area around the campus and airs a freeform format, with students producing and airing their own shows.

== Membership ==
DJs at WCUR can create and construct their own individual shows freely, with no parameters. However, this does not mean they are exempt from FCC guidelines. WCUR offers a wide variety of music, news, and sports. Therefore, some DJs have the opportunity to broadcast live sports events at WCU, mainly football and basketball.

If students wish to join the station, they must complete lessons to learn FCC guidelines and policies. After participating 6 weeks of lessons, trainees must complete studio observations, a written test, and an "on-air" test. After successfully completing all requirements trainees officially become members of the station and are eligible to sign-up for a desired show time.

Since WCUR serves the community of West Chester, DJs are required to give a psa, an on-campus announcement, and the weather once every hour. On the WCUR website, the organization not only asks for news from the community, but hosts events, recommends music, and provides a weather minute.

== History ==
The history of carrier current radio at WCU predates the current FM by several decades. Originally known as "WCSC", the station had adopted the "WCUR" name by 1974. It was listenable at 640 kHz in campus buildings; a small FM transmission covering the Sykes Student Union and Wayne Hall was also added.

In 1992, West Chester University applied for an FM station; a previous attempt in the late 1970s had been derailed by lack of approval for funding, others in the mid-1980s created interference issues with a station in Delaware or with TV channel 6, and constant turnover of staff and students (numbering some 75 by 1998) also hindered efforts. The construction permit was granted on March 20, 1998, and after municipal approval of a tower atop the Student Union, broadcasting began on September 1, 1999. Web streaming was added in 2001.
