= WIUM =

Coordinates: 40.428°N 90.683°W

- Macomb, Illinois; United States
- Frequency: 91.3 (MHz)
- Branding: Tri States Public Radio

Programming
- Format: Public broadcasting
- Affiliations: American Public Media; National Public Radio; Public Radio Exchange

Ownership
- Owner: Western Illinois University
- Sister stations: WIUW; WVKC

History
- First air date: 1956
- Call sign meaning: Western Illinois University Macomb

Technical information
- Licensing authority: FCC
- Class: B
- ERP: 50,000 watts
- HAAT: 148 meters (486 ft)

Links
- Public license information: Public file; LMS
- Website: www.tspr.org

WIUM (91.3 FM) is a 50,000-watt radio station licensed to Macomb, Illinois, in west-central Illinois. Western Illinois University is the station licensee, authorized by the Federal Communications Commission.

== Mission ==
Tri States Public Radio is an outreach service of the College of Fine Arts and Communication at Western Illinois University.

== Early history ==
After World War II, the University of Illinois Urbana-Champaign hosted the National Association of Educational Broadcasters (NEAB) for the establishment of broadcast allocations (AM/FM radio and TV channels) for non-commercial education programming. The outcomes of meetings underwritten by the Rockefeller Foundation (Allerton I) in 1949 and (Allerton II) in 1950 established the foundation for National Public Radio and the Public Broadcasting System.

In 1956, Western Illinois University established WWKS for educational radio broadcasting at 91.3 MHz with 3,000 watts. The station's FCC call letters were attributed to William Kimbrough Shake, who installed the equipment acquired from Gates Radio, in Quincy, IL. The station's mission was to provide educational programming primarily for the growing K-12 audiences in west-central Illinois. The radio studios were located in Tillman Hall (the "new science building") and a 250-foot (76 m) radio tower was constructed south of Murray Street, at the north edge of the university in 1956.

With the completion of the university's "new library", Memorial Hall in 1962, WWKS studios were relocated to the top floor. The radio station and adjacent video studios would remain at this location for the next 40 years. The station's sole full-time employee throughout the decade is Elmer "Tug" Haddock, who served as General Manager and provided supervision of volunteer student announcers. In 1964 Sallee Hall (College of Fine Arts and foreign languages) was built along Murray Strret and adjacent (north) of the WIUM tower, the station's transmitter was moved to the roof of Sallee Hall in a specially designed enclosure. The station's FCC call sign was changed in 1970 to WIUM, to better reflect the station's ownership (Western Illinois University - Macomb) and mission.

== Expansion ==
- 1970 - WWKS becomes WIUM.
- 1978 - WIUM increases power to 7,200 watts. The 19-hour broadcast day features classical, jazz and rock music with some local news, sports and weather. The Radio Information Service is created to broadcast readings from local newspapers through specially tuned receivers placed with people with a print disability. The service was inspired and initiated by Helen L. Wear, the first blind woman to graduate from Western Illinois University.
- 1981 - WIUM relocates its transmitter to the new 500-foot (150 m) tower at Western Illinois University's Horn Campus south of Macomb. This tower was constructed to jointly support WIUM-FM and the new Public Broadcasting Service (PBS) television station (WIUM-TV), part of the Convocom network, to serve west-central Illinois. The original WIUM-FM tower adjacent to Sallee Hall was dismantled in the following years. WIUM-TV became WMEC in 1989 and relocated to a new tower site in 1997.
- 1982 - WIUM qualifies for Corporation for Public Broadcasting support and becomes a member station of National Public Radio. Coinciding with the addition of NPR programming is the organization of a second station to be run and programmed by WIU students (WIUS-FM, now in the Department of Broadcasting in Sallee Hall).

WIUM & WIUW coverage map

- 1983 - WIUM's first on-air membership drive raises $3,550 in pledges.
- 1984 - The station purchases its first compact disc player and begins 24-hour-a-day broadcasts.

== Tri States Public Radio ==
- 1989 - WIUM increases its power to 50,000 watts.
- 1990 - Production of Rural Route 3 begins. The award-winning live performance series is distributed to public radio stations nationwide throughout the decade.
- 1991 - WIUM's administrative reporting line is moved from Broadcast and Educational Communication Services to the School of Extended and Continuing Education.
- 1995 - Tri States Public Radio is born as WIUW signs on at 89.5 FM. The new tower and transmitter just outside Warsaw, Illinois extend public radio service into southeast Iowa and northeast Missouri.
- 2002 - Tri States Public Radio moves into a new, state-of-the-art broadcast facility at 320 University Drive at the front door of the Western Illinois University campus.
- 2004 - Tri States Public Radio becomes part of the College of Fine Arts and Communication. The Southeast Iowa News Bureau in the Hotel Iowa in downtown Keokuk opens.
- 2005 - WIUM become the first University-licensed public radio service in the state of Illinois to begin broadcasting in HD (high definition) Radio technology.
- 2007 - Tri States Public Radio enters into a partnership agreement to provide daytime NPR programming to the Galesburg radio market via WVKC at Knox College.
- 2013 - Tri States Public Radio entered into a 20-year management agreement to operate Knox College's WVKC-FM as a full-time NPR station for the Galesburg market. Knox College will retain its license to WVKC. Tri-States Radio will provide equipment and technical support to enhance the school's capacity to deliver a high-quality audio stream
- 2014 - Tri States Public Radio adds translator station K292GR at 106.3 FM to serve the Burlington, IA area.

== See also ==
- Western Illinois University
- CONVOCOM
