= WHRW =

Radio station at Binghamton University in Binghamton, New York

- Binghamton, New York; United States
- Broadcast area: Binghamton, Vestal, Johnson City, Endicott
- Frequency: 90.5 MHz

Programming
- Format: Freeform

Ownership
- Owner: Binghamton University; (State University of New York)

History
- First air date: 1966
- Call sign meaning: "Harpur College Radio Workshop" (at the time of conception, the University was known as "Harpur College")

Technical information
- Licensing authority: FCC
- Facility ID: 63105
- Class: A
- ERP: 1,450 watts
- HAAT: 29.8 meters (98 ft)
- Transmitter coordinates: 42°5′24.00″N 75°58′5.00″W

Links
- Public license information: Public file; LMS
- Webcast: Listen live
- Website: whrw.fm

WHRW (90.5 FM) is Binghamton University's non-profit, student-run, free-format radio station. The station is licensed and owned by Binghamton University, serving the New York college area. WHRW transmits out of the Glenn G. Bartle Library Tower and has operational facilities in the SUNY Binghamton Student Union.

WHRW is operated by the students of SUNY Binghamton and interested members of the Greater Binghamton community. WHRW operates 24 hours a day, seven days a week and broadcasts using a 2 kW transmitter at 90.5 MHz.

WHRW's air staff consists of volunteers who become members by apprenticing under a current member for a programming season and then passing a Clearance Exam. Since 1996, WHRW members have participated in a "Station Service" program, by which they accrue hours by accomplishing tasks that support the station. The support hours are then used to determine the member's "slotting priority" when they request a show. This guarantees that those who give more time to the station have more opportunities.

Broadcasters at WHRW speaking in "Studio A" in 2013, seen from control board, portion of record library behind them

== Beginnings as a radio workshop ==
In the 1950s, Binghamton University was known as Harpur College, a public college of the State of New York. In 1954, a loose organization formally called "The Radio Workshop of Harpur College" was formed. Its primary function was to create a network with interested college students and local commercial radio stations, with the intention of providing the opportunity to be involved in doing production work for these stations.

In October 1961, members of the Workshop began to construct their own AM transmitter. The first installment of a self-broadcasting Workshop started in May 1962. The station was called WRAF, where "RAF" stood for Harpur College's Rafuse Residence Hall, the origin of the broadcast. While the station was received on 590 kHz on AM radio, the broadcasts were carrier-current as they were transmitted through the power lines of only two residence halls. Accordingly, only the residents of those halls could receive the maiden broadcasts.

== A "no rock-and-roll" policy ==
While WHRW's accessible format environment would arguably become the station's strongest suit, the days of experimental FM had not yet happened and WRAF's days were different. The station regularly polled the student body to try and create a programming schedule acceptable to its audience. WRAF had a "no rock-and-roll" policy and focused its broadcast day mostly on classical and "good" non-classical music. However, in 1965, WRAF had its first rock-and-roll show.

== The move to FM ==
In 1965, WRAF's General Manager proposed moving the station to the FM band, which was still largely unused. In November of that year, the FCC approved the construction of an educational station at 90.5 MHz. The FCC approved the station's request for WHRW as the new station's call letters. "HRW" was chosen to represent Harpur Radio Workshop. While stereo FM had been introduced in the early 1960s, it was not an inexpensive technology, WHRW's first transmitter was a humble 10W in mono.

WHRW's first broadcast was on Friday, February 4, 1966, at 7:30 pm, which covered a Binghamton Colonials basketball game. The formal inaugural broadcast took place two days later. WHRW was only the third FM radio station in the Binghamton market.

The broadcasting followed the times and the culture in which it was steeped:

- Jazz, folk, classical, rock, and other forms of music.
- News and culture coverage that leaned progressive (Vietnam War protests and debates, news from Pacifica Radio and the BBC).
- Interviews with local political figures.

The regular broadcast schedule ran from Sunday through Thursday, from about 5 pm to 1 am.

In the spring of 1967, the mayor of Binghamton, Joseph Esworthy, was interviewed on the "Open Line" show by the station's general manager, David R. Cooper. When Esworthy was asked if he favored the legalization of marijuana, he answered affirmatively. The next day, the local media picked up the story, and it is believed that the publicity is what ended Esworthy's political career.

In the late 1960s, construction on the new "Faculty Tower" (later more famously named the Glenn G. Bartle Library Tower) was completed. WHRW's antenna was moved to the top of this building in April 1968 and remained there to this day. 1969, the year of Woodstock, WHRW-FM broadcast for the first time during the summer months with local volunteers on a daily schedule of music variety shows and news under the first summer General Manager. The program schedule became enormously popular with local listeners and WHRW-FM attracted many more. From that time forward, WHRW-FM has maintained summer programming.

== The "old station" ==
While WRAF/WHRW had called several locations home before September 1968, it would be the move during that month that would find them a home for more than 30 years. University Union 266, on what is called the "Mezzanine Level" of the University Union, was WHRW's new home in 1968.

The facility was built specifically for the station, with two control rooms (which were named "Control Room 1", or "CR-1"; and "Control Room 2", or "CR-2"), a place for extra people to be hosted for group broadcasts (dubbed "Studio A"), rooms for records, and office space. There was also a "lobby," an open room that had couches and chairs, bulletin boards with station news and current events, and WHRW's broadcast piped in through speakers.

In the late 1960s, station members began to augment the normal decor of a college radio station by writing and drawing on the walls. These graffiti gave the station an even more enigmatic feel, and by 2000 nearly every inch of the facility had been "personalized" in one form or another.

In 2002, the station was forced in to move to the new University Union after Binghamton University decided they were re-purposing the original Union building. However, the budget for the project was misappropriated, and the project ran out of money before the old building could be re-purposed. The shell of the "old station," as it was called, existed in exactly the condition in which it was left after the move for five years, until mid-2007, when renovation work finally began.

== Moe Loogham ==
In the early 1970s, a strange graffito started to appear on campus. A picture in the 1973 yearbook shows "Moe Loogham Is Coming!" spray-painted on the plywood walls surrounding the School of Engineering building construction site at Binghamton University, which was then known as Harpur College. From the mid-1970s onward, Moe Loogham was referred to frequently on WHRW's programs, in station publications, and all around campus. In fact, Moe's name has been seen in such diverse locations as at the top of the Washington Monument and in downtown Prague.

Moe appears to be an enigmatic folk legend whose name is derived from the name of a social club at a Hicksville, Long Island high school. (Moe's last name is believed to be a re-working of the name of the Rolling Stones' record producer, Andrew Loog Oldham). First word of Moe came to the third floor of the dormitory Delaware Hall on September 10, 1970. He was thought of more as the "Bringer of all Rightness" than anything else. In ensuing months, "Men (and Women) of Moe" would engage in "slapping missions" where simply-printed stickers with the words "Moe Loogham is Coming!" printed on them in plain block letters would be pasted in prominent locations on and off campus (like Lecture Hall-1, a popular meeting place for classes and student organizations on the Binghamton University campus).

"Moe" was said by some to be a drug dealer (which in those days meant a counterculture figure who functioned more like a neighborhood grocer or bartender than a criminal nuisance) or a shipment of drugs (which in those days usually meant marijuana ("Moe's Loogs"...), hashish or the odd tablet or sugar-cube of LSD). According to legend, he was supposed to have "so many drugs that no one would ever need to get drugs from anyone else again," and "drugs of many kinds and colors, drugs beyond one's wildest dreams." In later years, Moe was the nostalgic icon for the euphoria of the 1960s. But regardless of the times, the popular saying on campus was that "When Moe gets here, everything will be All Right!"

In more recent years as, new generations have called WHRW their own, Moe has become sort of a godhead to long-standing station members, a metaphor for the free spirit of WHRW. Moe's name is now often used to describe the euphoria often felt when good radio happens just right.

== The Golden Age of FM ==
In the early 1970s, some adventurous FM stations (such as KSAN-FM and WNEW-FM) began experimenting with programming based upon album tracks, not only from established artists but from more obscure bands as well. Many of these stations played records by bands few AM radio listeners had heard of at the time such as Led Zeppelin, The Chambers Brothers, Iron Butterfly, and spoken-comedy acts like Firesign Theatre. As in the early days of rock and roll, DJs would play a record based mostly upon their own judgement.

Experimental programming was also becoming popular, especially among college stations, and this time period is also where the term "progressive" or "underground" radio was born. It was the 1960s description of what we now call free-form radio. A DJ could play whatever they wanted as long as it did not violate Federal Communications Commission (FCC) regulations (some DJs played things which most certainly did), and a station's popularity depended upon how well its DJs knew music and how they applied that knowledge on the air. Classical was played alongside jazz; rock against folk music or folk-rock, and so on. Shows were often semi-scripted, using tape production to introduce both commentary and comedy rather than simple turn-table segues to press disparate sound, culture and music into a holistic collage that sometimes became art, but often challenged mind and senses in ways nearly painful for the thrill. In the mid-1970s free-form radio fell out of vogue, and many formerly progressive FM stations adopted an AM-like playlist and rotation schedule, though unlike today many of those stations would still offer specialty programming such as live concert simulcasts (most notably the King Biscuit Flower Hour) and comedy shows such as the National Lampoon Radio Hour and Dr. Demento. WHRW decided to preserve this format throughout those years and beyond, perhaps not intentionally, but simply by sticking with a style that suited its DJs and listeners.

== See also ==
- College radio
- List of college radio stations in the United States
