= WSND-FM =

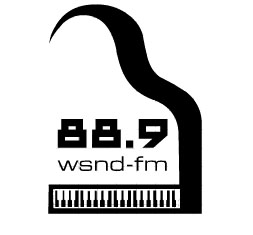
- Notre Dame, Indiana; United States
- Broadcast area: Michiana
- Frequency: 88.9 MHz
- Branding: WSND 88.9 FM

Programming
- Format: Classical music, jazz

Ownership
- Owner: University of Notre Dame

History
- First air date: September 17, 1962
- Call sign meaning: "Serving Notre Dame"

Technical information
- Licensing authority: FCC
- Facility ID: 70459
- Class: A
- ERP: 3,430 watts
- HAAT: 110 meters (360 ft)
- Transmitter coordinates: 41°36′19.2″N 86°12′45″W

Links
- Public license information: Public file; LMS
- Webcast: Listen live
- Website: wsnd.nd.edu

WSND-FM (88.9 MHz) is a non-commercial FM radio station licensed to Notre Dame, Indiana. It is owned by the University of Notre Dame and serves the South Bend – Mishawaka metropolitan area and other parts of Michigan and Indiana known as "Michiana". The station airs classical music during the day. In the evening, WSND-FM features other genres of music including jazz, folk, big bands, blues, Broadway showtunes and Celtic music.

WSND-FM's studios and offices are in the Duncan Student Center (Room W228) on the campus of the University of Notre Dame on Moose Krause Circle in South Bend. The transmitter is off Ironwood Road in the southern section of South Bend. Extended newscasts are heard at 7:30 am, 8:30 am, 12:30 pm, 4:30 pm, and 5:30 pm Monday through Friday, and at 12 pm on weekends. The PBS Newshour airs weeknights at 7 p.m.

== History ==
Notre Dame University had been operating a student run carrier current radio station, only heard around the campus, since the 1940s. It also owned WNDU (1490 AM), 92.9 WNDU-FM, and WNDU-TV (channel 16), which were commercial operations staffed by broadcasting professionals. (The WNDU radio stations were sold in 1998, and WNDU-TV was sold in 2005.)

The university wanted to put a student-run radio station on the air to help train students in broadcasting. On September 17, 1962, WSND-FM signed on the air as a 10 watt educational station licensed to the University of Notre Dame. It was operated by students during the university's Fall and Spring semesters and signed off during the summer and other school breaks.

In 1971, WSND-FM expanded its schedule and improved its signal coverage. A new 3,430 watt transmitter was installed, which covered the South Bend area and surrounding communities including parts of lower Michigan. WSND-FM added to its staff to include area volunteers who helped keep the station operating during summer breaks and other times when classes were not being held. Today, WSND-FM continues to be operated with a complementary mix of students and volunteers. In 2012, chief operator Edwin Jaroszewski celebrated his 40th year with the station.

In the mid-1980s, under the stewardship of Eliot Coe, who was Jazz Director from 1984 to 1986, the station pioneered an eclectic mix of jazz music. An evening program known as "Nocturne Nightflight" features rock, techno, metal and other current genres. "An Hour of Stories" is a weekly program featuring folktales, and "Explorations in Piano Literature" is a weekly excursion into canonical keyboard music research.

== See also ==
- Campus radio
- List of college radio stations in the United States
