= Sallee Hall =

Coordinates: 40.4660°N 90.6856°W

Sallee Hall is a three-story windowless building at Western Illinois University, Macomb Campus.

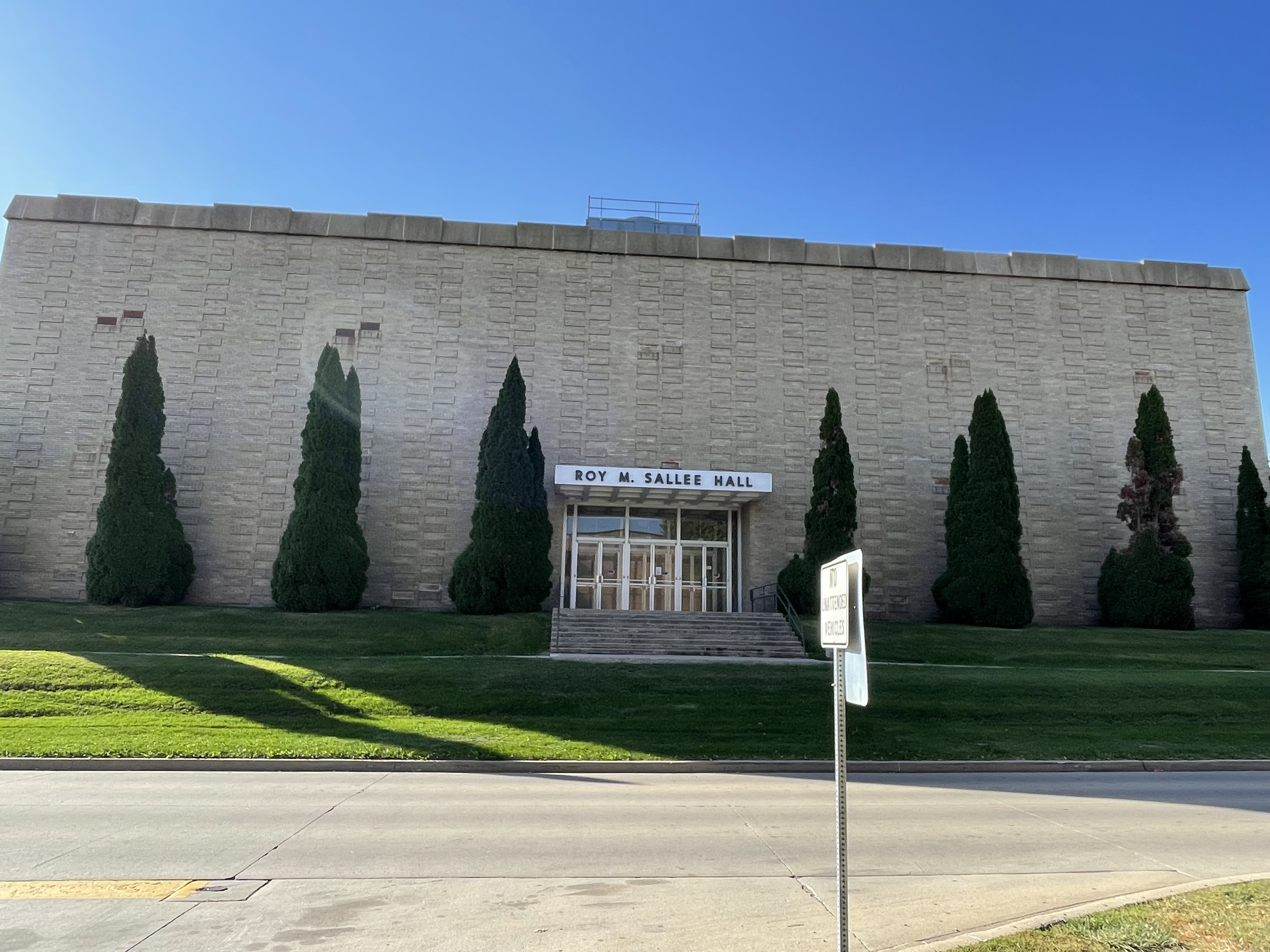
Sallee Hall, 2022

== History ==
Built in 1964, Sallee Hall, once known as the windowless classroom, was at the time thought to be unique in its construction with no other known classroom like it in Illinois. It was built with no windows to save costs in repairs, and to save costs when it comes to energy management. It was built at a time when space was needed for the University, and having thirty classrooms, as well as a few lecture rooms and conference rooms, with space for faculty and staff, gave the University the space it needed. When it opened in the fall of 1964, it was used for the English and Foreign Language Departments, as well as having health classes conducted there. There were discussions when it opened though as well, with how not having windows is unnatural for a classroom for teachers and students who have had windows all their lives, and how it could have a psychological effect.

In 1966, the windowless classroom became Sallee Hall. Named after Roy Sallee, who was a member of the Biology Department, and famous for his study of ants.

In 1983, a study was done at Western Illinois University by the Space Task Force. This had to do with enrollment being down at the time, and the university having more space than it did students. It was recommended that the top two floors of Sallee Hall should be closed because it would have the least amount of impact for the University. Dr. Jefferson, a Space Task Force member, claimed that the closing of Sallee Hall would not have any impact on anything at the university, and in fact, was a good building to choose to close due to the fact that faculty were not a fan of the windowless building. In 1984, Western Illinois University announced that they were following the proposal and closing the top two floors of Sallee Hall. The reasoning, while still about square footage per student, also included the fact that Sallee Hall was mostly classrooms. The top two floors, instead of sitting empty were to become storage. Dr. Jefferson stated again that the closing of Sallee Hall would have no negative impact on classes or activities. The closing of Sallee Hall did have backlash though. Faculty expressed problems with the closing to University President Malpass during a meeting. Faculty that had been displaced by the closing of Sallee Hall brought up the fact that not having assigned rooms led to problems, and trying to schedule classes when rooms are not assigned to professors led to scheduling problems. This also would lead to longer days for students and faculty. Which while some would not mind, it was pointed out that it should not only affect one department. Malpass stated that these changes occurred due to being able to save state dollars when it comes to utilities.

In 1986, The Women's Center was established and first located in Sallee Hall. It took up two classrooms, until it was moved in 1995.

In 1997, Sallee hall had to close for a morning due to a blown circuit breaker. Due to the fact that the current circuit system was obsolete, a different brand had to be modified to work in the old circuit system. This brought up concerns over the idea that the whole circuit system needed replaced at some point in the future, and that problems like this may arise due to being understaffed and working on older buildings with limited funds.

In September of 1997, it was announced that Sallee Hall was to close temporarily for asbestos abatement. Hinds Environmental Inc. had taken air-quality samples and ran asbestos tests and found that it would need abatement treatment due to the nature of the building itself. There was found to be asbestos on each floor, including the entrances, and in an auditorium classroom. The abatement issue was deemed a priority but was not hazardous at that point. There were concerns however, with the treatment of students when it came to the abatement, and having to relocate classes and equipment. There were also concerns when it came to the safety of students and on what harm would come to the equipment inside until Sallee Hall closed for the abatement.

== Sallee Hall Today ==
Today, Sallee Hall is home to the following departments: Communications, Broadcasting, Theater, Dance, and Music.
