= WBGU (FM) =

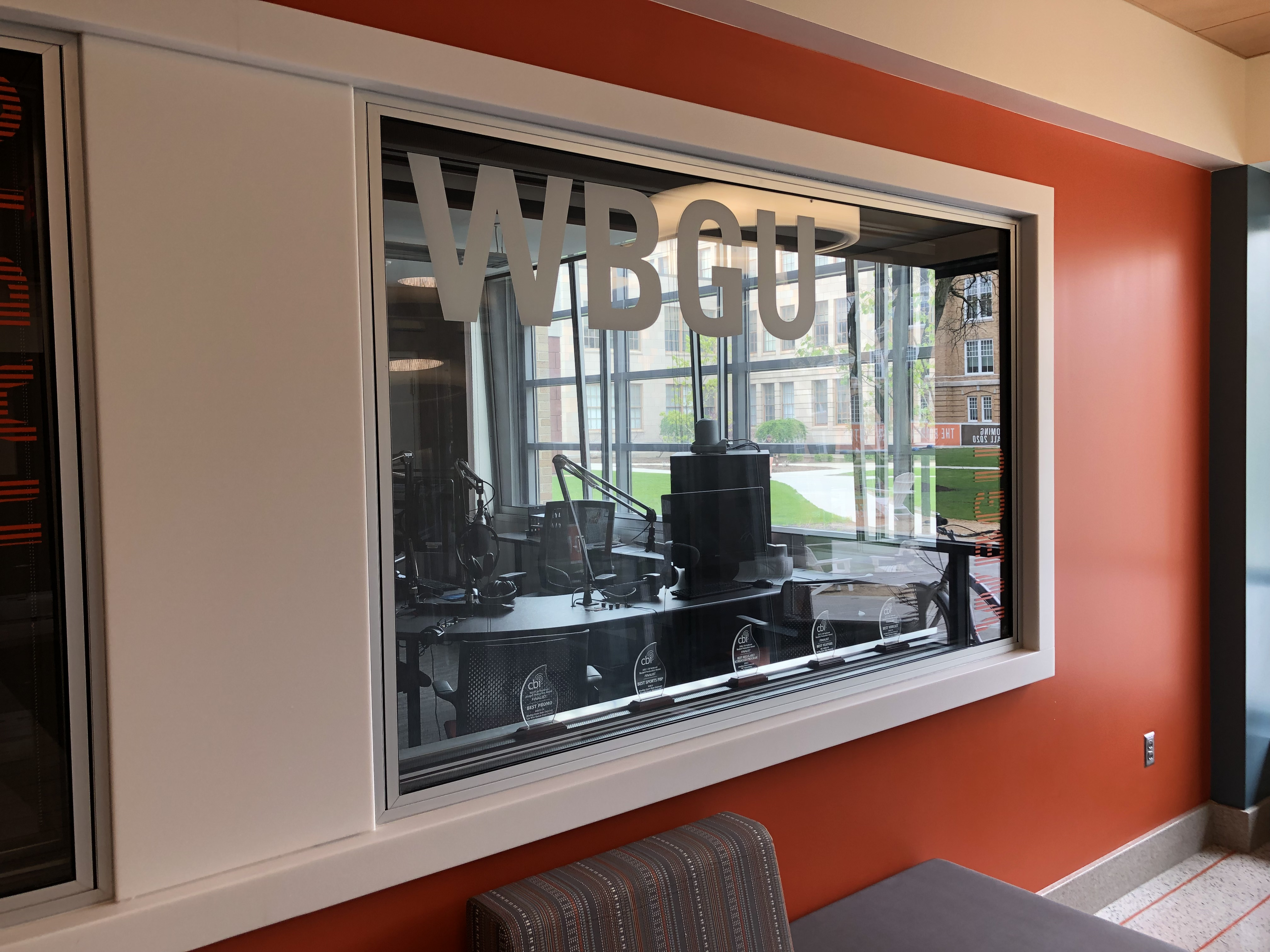
- The WBGU recording studio.
- Bowling Green, Ohio; United States
- Frequency: 88.1 MHz

Programming
- Language: English
- Format: College radio

Ownership
- Owner: Bowling Green State University
- Sister stations: WBGU-TV

History
- First air date: November 1951
- Former call signs: WRSM (Carrier current)
- Former frequencies: 600 kHz (Carrier current)
- Call sign meaning: Bowling Green University

Technical information
- Licensing authority: FCC
- Facility ID: 6567
- Class: A
- ERP: 450 watts
- HAAT: 54 meters (177 ft)
- Transmitter coordinates: 41°22′33″N 83°38′34″W

Links
- Public license information: Public file; LMS
- Webcast: Listen live
- Website: bgfalconmedia.com

WBGU (88.1 FM) is an American non-commercial, college radio station licensed to serve Bowling Green, Ohio, United States. The station, established in 1951, is owned and operated by Bowling Green State University.

WBGU broadcasts a college radio format from the campus of Bowling Green State University. WBGU is a student-run radio station that focuses on independent, underground, and under-represented music.

== History ==
WBGU's origins begin with a public address system built to broadcast a Bowling Green basketball game with audio phoned in from New York City in December 1947. This led to a carrier current station known as "WRSM" signing on in January 1948 at 600 kHz. This station, run by students and volunteers, was authorized by the Federal Communications Commission (FCC) and was affiliated with the Intercollegiate Broadcasting System. Repeated expansion led the university in 1951 to apply to the FCC for a construction permit to build an FM broadcasting station, licensed as "WBGU" in November 1951, with 10 watts of effective radiated power on a frequency of 88.1 MHz. In the six decades since it launched, the station has upgraded its signal strength, studio facilities, and equipment to meet the needs of the campus and the surrounding area.

WBGU is the flagship home for Bowling Green Falcons hockey, women's basketball and volleyball broadcasts from the student-ran Falcon Media Sports Network.
