= WJHU =

Radio station based in Baltimore, Maryland, United States

Coordinates: 39°19′41″N 76°37′18″W

- United States
- Broadcast area: Baltimore metropolitan area
- Frequency: Internet

Programming
- Format: College radio

Ownership
- Owner: Johns Hopkins University

History
- First air date: 1945
- Call sign meaning: W Johns; Hopkins; University

Links
- Website: https://wjhuradio.jhu.edu/

WJHU is a student-run internet radio station based in Baltimore, Maryland. The station is run by students of Johns Hopkins University, who are mainly on-air deejays and other program hosts. Programming blocks are divided into formats, dealing mostly with music, sports and cultural life: classical, dance, folk, jazz, public affairs, sports, rap, and rock formats — along with a few specialty shows outside any of the formats. Its studios are located on the Homewood campus.

== History ==
=== Early years ===
WJHU had its antecedents in the mid-1940s with an informal broadcast from Levering Hall on the Homewood campus. In the early 1950s the campus radio station moved into the basement of the Alumni Memorial Residences II (AMR II), where it would stay for the next thirty years. WJHU transmitted on the 830 AM frequency in the dormitories via carrier current (a low-wattage transmission using the wiring in buildings).

By the mid-1970s, the station operated with students running 3-hour shows on a 24/7 programming schedule. The station also carried away Johns Hopkins lacrosse games with student announcers. A long-time goal of the station was to transition to being an actual broadcast station on FM (which was the ostensible reason for requiring all staff to obtain a U.S. Federal Communications Commission (FCC) 3rd class operator's license).

Technical issues in 1975 led to suspension of broadcasting for much of the academic year and to questions among the staff concerning management. This in turn led in early 1976 to changes in management, programming, and use of facilities, as well as to increased attention from the university administration.

=== FM transition ===
In 1977, the student managers of the station and the university administration agreed to push for an FCC license to broadcast on 88.1 FM. Official and budgetary support from the university administration made this possible, and final approval for a 10-watt station on 88.1 FM came from the FCC in 1978.

WJHU-FM began broadcasting in 1979, featuring a mixed format with jazz in the early morning, classical during the day, specialty programming in the early evening during weekdays and Saturday/Sunday morning including 60's oldies (with radio announcer Michael Yockel), acoustic/folk music (No Strings Attached with radio announcer Gary Kenneth Bass), art-rock (with radio announcer Janet Sanford), bluegrass (with radio announcer Carol Burris) and Irish music (with radio announcer Myron Bretholz); rock till midnight (predominantly new wave), and its signature NAR ("Not Available Radio") progressive programming at night, along with short news programming. The signal extended off campus and the students hired for the first time a non-student to oversee the station full-time and ensure compliance with FCC rules and university expectations. The station operated twenty-four hours a day.

Faced with FCC deregulation of low-wattage FM stations in the early 1980s, and in order to protect the frequency, the student managers decided to apply for a 25,000 watt license, which would extend the audience throughout the Baltimore and Washington DC area. This became the largest radio station power increase on record. The application was approved in 1982, however the station went off the air in 1983-4 due to renovation of AMR II in which the studios were located. The station returned to the air in February 1985.

=== Transition to professional operations ===
In the summer of 1985, the university hired a full-professional staff to run WJHU. Broadcasting classical music and talk, it quickly out-paced its classical competition (WBJC) and scored solid audience numbers. Over the years it progressively added more content from National Public Radio and its partners, shifting to the format of news/talk in the daytime and overnight weekday hours, and music (mainly jazz) programming during evenings and nights.

WJHU-FM apparently encountered financial difficulties, and before some fundraising success in the early 1990s, the university considered selling it.

WJHU became the area National Public Radio affiliate, and in the fall of 1998, it added overnight coverage of World Radio Network (WRN).

=== Sale to Your Public Radio Corp. ===
The university decided to sell the station, due to the expense of maintaining it, and the fact that it did not fit with the Johns Hopkins' mission.

The station and frequency were sold by the university in early 2002 to Your Public Radio Corp., a locally based group of station talk hosts and listeners, and became WYPR.

=== Revival of student radio on carrier-current ===
In the early 1990s, students founded the alternative on-campus carrier current AM radio station called WHAT radio and later renamed WHSR (standing for Hopkins Student Radio). Like the earlier WJHU-AM, this station transmitted within the dorms, but it also added Levering Hall and the Charles apartments. This effort ended in 2000.

=== WJHU internet radio ===
During the summer of 2002, a group of Hopkins students began a new radio effort, and with the assistance of the Dean of Student Life, established a new internet radio station under the name WJHU. It began broadcasting on 22 April 2003.
