= KRSN =

- Los Alamos, New Mexico; United States
- Broadcast area: Santa Fe, New Mexico
- Frequency: 1490 kHz
- Branding: KRSN AM 1490 FM 107.1

Programming
- Format: Defunct (formerly variety)
- Affiliations: CBS News Radio; Westwood One

Ownership
- Owner: Gillian Sutton

History
- First air date: December 9, 1949
- Last air date: August 30, 2020
- Call sign meaning: "Kommunity Radio Station Now"

Technical information
- Facility ID: 12810
- Class: C
- Power: 1,000 watts unlimited
- Transmitter coordinates: 35°53′38″N 106°17′35″W
- Translator: 107.1 K296GI (Los Alamos)

Links
- Website: KRSN on Facebook

KRSN (1490 AM) was a radio station. Licensed to Los Alamos, New Mexico, United States, the station served the Los Alamos, Espanola and Santa Fe areas. The station was last owned by Gillian Sutton and featured programming from CBS News Radio and Westwood One. The station was an affiliate of the syndicated Pink Floyd program "Floydian Slip."

KRSN, whose slogan was "Kommunity Radio Station Now", also streamed live on the web.

KRSN won ten New Mexico Broadcaster Association Awards including Radio Division 4 Station of the Year for 2010.

KRSN traced its history to "KRS", a local "carrier current" station with restricted coverage, which was established in conjunction with the Manhattan Project, and started broadcasting in February 1946. KRSN signed on December 9, 1949, and was licensed on January 23, 1950.

On August 11, 2020, the owners of the station, David and Gillian Sutton, announced that the station would go dark on August 30. They cited lack of advertising and local sporting events, due to COVID-19, as the reason for shutting down.

The owners surrendered KRSN's license to the Federal Communications Commission on May 1, 2023. The license was cancelled the following day. The license for K296GI was also deleted.
