= WXOU =

- Auburn Hills, Michigan; United States
- Broadcast area: Metro Detroit
- Frequency: 88.3 MHz

Programming
- Format: College Radio

Ownership
- Owner: Oakland University

Technical information
- Licensing authority: FCC
- Facility ID: 49941
- Class: A
- ERP: 110 watts
- HAAT: 78.0 meters (255.9 ft)
- Transmitter coordinates: 42°42′34.6″N 83°13′49.7″W

Links
- Public license information: Public file; LMS
- Website: http://www.wxou.org/

WXOU (88.3 FM) is a college radio station licensed to Auburn Hills, Michigan, United States, the station serves the metro Detroit area and Oakland County. The station is currently owned by Oakland University. WXOU programming includes music, sports, and news with most being student-produced programs.

== History ==
The station with the current call sign WXOU (acquired in 1/21/1994) was formerly WAEK (assigned 8/6/1993) and has been on air since 1967, starting as carrier current station using call sign WVW. It was in 1991 that the FCC approved construction permits for the station to move from AM to FM. As a carrier current station, call signs WOUX (1975) and WOU (1974) were used. The Michigan Association of Broadcasters named WXOU College Radio Station of the year in 2012 and again in 2013.

== See also ==
- Campus radio
- List of college radio stations in the United States
