= WKDG =

Radio station in Sumiton, Alabama (1980–2019)

Sumiton, Alabama; United States
- Broadcast area: Birmingham, Alabama
- Frequency: 1540 kHz

Programming
- Format: Gospel music

Ownership
- Owner: Robin H. May; (Communications and Educational Development Initiative)

History
- First air date: 1980
- Former call signs: WRSM (1980–2009)

Technical information
- Facility ID: 63652
- Class: D
- Power: 1,000 watts day 3 watts night
- Transmitter coordinates: 33°45′50″N 87°03′47″W

WKDG (1540 AM) was a radio station licensed to serve Sumiton, Alabama, United States. The station, originally licensed in 1980, was owned by Kingdom Radio Network, Inc.

WKDG previously broadcast a gospel music format.

== History ==
WRSM was originally granted a construction permit by the FCC on October 27, 1977. The station was granted a license to cover on May 6, 1980.

== Ownership ==
In 2002, a legal dispute between a shareholder of Sumiton Broadcasting Company and the estate of a deceased shareholder led to the station being taken off the air for more than a year. The FCC cancelled the broadcast license and withdrew the WRSM call letters until a successful petition, filed in August 2005, was granted in March 2007. Sumiton announced its intention to sell WRSM to American Trust Corporation, a subsidiary of Hilliard & Co., for $106,501. This application was dismissed by the FCC in April 2008.

In May 2008, Sumiton filed a new application to transfer the broadcast license to Joy Christian Communications, Inc. This transfer would be a straight donation to a non-profit organization. The transfer was approved on November 18, 2008, but as of February 18, 2009, the transaction had yet to be consummated. The station's call sign was changed from WRSM to WKDG on August 27, 2009, when the license was transferred to Communications and Educational Development Initiatives, aka Kingdom Radio Network. The license transfer was consummated and approved by the FCC in September 2009.

On February 12, 2019, WKDG's license was cancelled by the FCC.
