= Henry Bartholomay =

Flight leader Lieutenant Henry Adams "Black Bart" Bartholomay (March 20, 1945 – October 5, 2015) was a United States Naval Aviator. He was a recipient of the Silver Star and the Distinguished Flying Cross.

== Biography ==
He was born in Chicago, Illinois. He graduated from Rockford College in 1967.

He entered the Naval Reserve in 1967 and began active duty in the Naval Aviation Officer's program at Naval Air Station Pensacola, Florida. After receiving his Wings of Gold in 1969 at Naval Air Station Kingsville, Texas, Lieutenant Bartholomay was assigned to the replacement F-4 Phantom Air Wing at Naval Base Coronado, California and then to Fighter Squadron 161, aboard USS Midway. After one tour of duty in Vietnam, Lt. Bartholomay was assigned as Weapons Training Officer and completed advanced fighter weapons and air combat maneuvering training at the Navy Strike Fighter Tactics Instructor program (TOPGUN) in February, 1972.

During his second tour of duty on board USS Midway in Vietnam, Lt. Bartholomay, and his radar intercept officer (RIO) Oran Brown flying their F-4B Phantom II, along with wingman Lt. Patrick E. Arwood, and Arwood's RIO Lt. James M. Bell, confronted and shot down two North Vietnamese MiG-19 enemy aircraft on May 18, 1972 during Operation Linebacker for which they were awarded the Silver Star.

Completing his Naval Reserve duty in December 1972, Lt. Bartholomay had accumulated 267 carrier landings, 1200 flight hours, and was awarded the Silver Star, Distinguished Flying Cross, 10 Strike Flight Air Medals. After leaving the navy, he went on to work as a weapons system engineer at Point Mugu, California, consulting on the Sidewinder Missile. At the end of that consulting contract, he returned to the Chicago area and worked in the insurance, investment, and technology industries.

He died in Vero Beach, Florida.
