= WIUS =

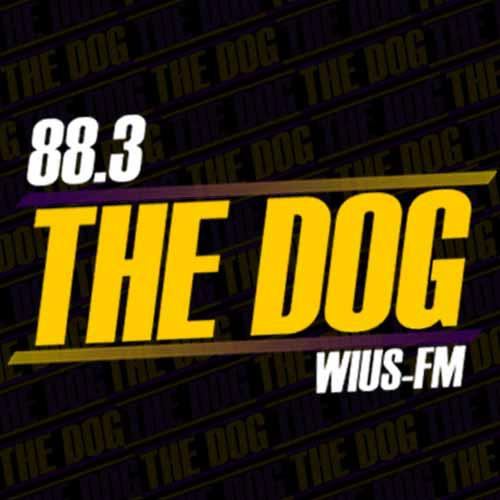
- Macomb, Illinois; United States
- Broadcast area: McDonough County - Illinois
- Frequency: 88.3 MHz
- Branding: 88.3 The Dog

Programming
- Format: Alternative Rock, Urban Contemporary & Sports Talk

Ownership
- Owner: Western Illinois University
- Sister stations: WIUM

History
- First air date: September 1, 1981

Technical information
- Licensing authority: FCC
- Facility ID: 71788
- Class: A
- ERP: 120 watts
- HAAT: 25.0 meters (82.0 ft)
- Transmitter coordinates: 40°27′56″N 90°41′09″W

Links
- Public license information: Public file; LMS
- Webcast: Listen Live

WIUS (88.3 FM) is a student-run college radio station licensed to Western Illinois University. The station serves the Macomb, Illinois area. The station airs a Variety format and also broadcasts select home basketball, softball, volleyball, and football games.

== See also ==
- Campus radio
- List of college radio stations in the United States
