= Western Illinois University =

Public university in Macomb, Illinois, US

- Former names: Western Illinois State Normal School (1899–1921); Western Illinois State Teachers College (1921–1947); Western Illinois State College (1947–1957)
- Motto: Your potential. Our purpose.
- Type: Public university
- Established: April 24, 1899; 127 years ago
- Accreditation: HLC
- Endowment: $84.3 million
- President: Kristi Mindrup
- Academic staff: 515 (fall 2022)
- Administrative staff: 798 (fall 2022)
- Students: 4,447 (fall 2026)
- Undergraduates: 3,203
- Postgraduates: 1,244
- Location: Macomb, Illinois, United States; 40°28′13″N 90°41′16″W
- Campus: 64 buildings over 1,050 acres (424.9 ha) on Macomb's residential campus
- Other campuses: Moline
- Newspaper: Western Courier
- Colors: Purple and gold
- Nickname: Leathernecks
- Sporting affiliations: NCAA Division I FCS — Ohio Valley Conference
- Mascots: Colonel Rock (Live Bulldog), Rocky (Costumed Bulldog)
- Website: wiu.edu
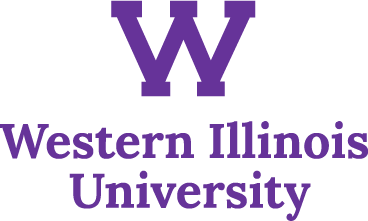

Western Illinois University (WIU) is a public university in Macomb, Illinois, United States. Western Illinois has an additional campus in Moline.

== History ==
Western Illinois University was founded on April 24, 1899. The land for the university was donated by Macomb's Freemasons (Illinois Lodge #17). Macomb was in direct competition with Quincy, Aledo, Monmouth, La Harpe, and Rushville, as candidates for the site of a "western" university. The Illinois legislature selected Macomb as the location. University administrators uncovered evidence of the Freemasons' efforts on Macomb's behalf when they opened Sherman Hall's (the administration building) cornerstone during centennial celebrations. Named after legislative leader L.Y. Sherman.

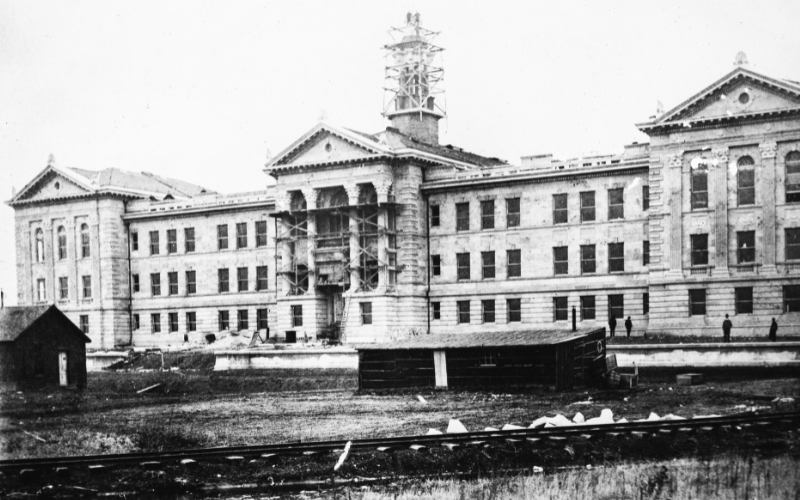
Sherman Hall under construction c. 1900.

Classes first began on campus on September 23, 1902 with 229 students enrolled. Founders' Day is celebrated on campus every September 23 to mark this event.

The university's name has changed three times since its foundation as the Western Illinois State Normal School in 1899: the school was first renamed Western Illinois State Teachers College in 1921 and then to Western Illinois State College in 1947 and finally Western Illinois University in 1957.

Sherman Hall was the university's primary facility for many years, but as the university and its programs expanded, a need surfaced for further expansion. Today, the Macomb campus consists of 53 buildings over 1,050 acres (424.9 ha). Sherman Hall is listed on the National Register of Historic Places. Western's presence in the Quad Cities spans more than 40 years. In Fall 1960, the university offered its first undergraduate course in the Quad Cities.

In 2016 and 2017, WIU saw a major downsizing and exodus of faculty and staff as a consequence of state budget cuts and declining undergraduate enrollment.

== Academics ==
Western Illinois University is composed of four academic colleges:

- Arts & Sciences
- Business & Technology
- Education & Human Services
- Fine Arts & Communication

In addition Western Illinois also offers an Honors College and the School of Extended Studies, which includes nontraditional programs. In 2023, U.S. News & World Report ranked the university #39 (tie) out of 167 Regional Universities Midwest and, as a Midwest Regional University, #17 in Best Colleges for Veterans (tie), #51 in Best Value Schools, #38 in Top Performers on Social Mobility (tie), and #9 in Top Public Schools (tie).

The university offers 69 undergraduate majors, over 51 bachelor's degree programs and 13 pre-professional degrees at the undergraduate level. At the graduate level, 42 degree and certificate programs are offered. 95% of all courses are taught by full-time faculty. The university offers a Doctorate of Education in Educational Leadership (Ed. D.), which was established in 2005.

Western's Cost Guarantee Plan is a four-year fixed rate for tuition, fees, room and board that remains in place as long as students are continuously enrolled. Western was one of the first institutions in America, and the first state university in Illinois, to offer the guarantee. Western Illinois also offers the Cost Guarantee for graduate students enrolled in a degree program, as well as to transfer students earning an associate degree. Those students who transfer to WIU the following semester upon completing their associate degree will receive the previous year's cost guarantee rates.

=== Rankings ===
Academic rankings

Regional
- U.S. News & World Report: 57 (tie)

=== Library system ===
Four libraries make up the WIU Libraries system. Completed in November 1975, Leslie F. Malpass Library (formerly Memorial Library) is the main branch of the library system. Designed by Gyo Obata, Malpass Library stands at six levels high and 222,000 square feet. Other WIU libraries include the Music Library, Physical Sciences Library, Curriculum Library, and the WIU-Quad Cities Library (Moline, Illinois) that was opened in the late 1990s to support WIU's growing presence in the Quad Cities.

Western Illinois University Libraries house several archives and special collections that aid in documenting the history of the west-central Illinois region. The libraries are the home for the Center for Hancock County History, the Center for Icarian Studies, the Civil War Collection (documenting the western Illinois experience in the war), the Decker Press Collection and the Mormon Collection.

In August of 2024 university leaders announced their intentions to fire all of the library faculty, 8 tenured librarians and one on the tenure track. From 2013 to 2024, the number of library faculty at the university diminished from 16 to 9 and the number of semiprofessional and clerical staff diminished from 41 to 20. In June 2026, an arbitrator declared that the faculty librarians were illegally terminated and WIU was ordered to reinstate them.

=== Centennial Honors College ===
Centennial Honors College was founded in 1983 in order to attract more adept students and to provide an avenue for excellence. Accordingly, the GPA admissions standard for the Centennial Honors College is nearly a full grade point higher (0.9) than the minimum GPA of any other college at the university. Honors students complete a series of honors courses and projects and are also eligible for exclusive scholarships.

=== Western Illinois University Quad Cities ===
An artist's rendition of WIU-QC

Western Illinois University Quad Cities (WIU-QC) is located in the Quad Cities metropolitan area, a region of cities in northwest Illinois and southeast Iowa, and is located along the Mississippi River in Moline, Illinois. Western Illinois has been in the Quad Cities dating back to 1912 when they first began offering extension classes in Moline and Rock Island. WIU-QC was previously an upper-division commuter site located on John Deere Road in Moline, Illinois. The branch began a move to the Moline riverfront in 2012, and has expanded to serve all levels of the college experience, from the freshman year to professional development.

Riverfront Hall, built in 2012 on the site of the former John Deere Tech Center, houses the College of Business and Technology, including the School of Engineering formerly located in the Caxton Building in downtown Moline. In 2014, the Quad Cities Complex was added, three connected buildings which house the Colleges of Arts and Sciences, Education and Human Services, and Fine Arts and Communications, as well as the library, student services, and administration.

In August 2024, the University decided to "streamline" its offerings at the Quad Cities campus. In December 2025, the University announced that it is looking to sell Quad Cities Complex Building C as it consolidates programs into Riverfront Hall.

== Student life ==
=== Organizations ===
Western Illinois University offers over 250 registered student organizations including multicultural, athletic, philanthropic, academic/professional, Greek, social, and religious-based organizations.

=== Media ===
==== Newspaper ====
The Western Courier is the school newspaper at Western Illinois University. It is published each Monday, Wednesday and Friday during the academic year, excluding holidays and breaks. Summer publication is on Wednesdays only. The Western Courier is the only officially recognized student newspaper on campus and is distributed free.

==== Radio ====
Western Illinois also has a student-run radio station, 88.3 The Dog, WIUS-FM. The radio station can be heard across McDonough County on 88.3 FM, as well as online through their website (883thedog.com) and their mobile apps.

91.3 FM, WIUM, Tri States Public Radio, is the NPR affiliate on the campus of Western Illinois University.

==== Television ====
NEWS3 is Western Illinois University's student-produced television newscast, broadcasting and streaming live 30-minute newscasts on Tuesdays and Thursdays at 4 p.m. The newsroom, studio, and control room are housed on the third floor of Sallee Hall.

== Athletics ==
Inspired by the surrounding "vast golden prairie strewn with purple coneflowers," Western Illinois University adopted purple and gold as its official colors in 1902. WIU is the only non-military institution in the nation with permission from the Department of the Navy to use the United States Marine Corps Official seal and mascot, the Bulldog. Colonel Rock and Rocky, are the university mascots representing "The Fighting Leathernecks". Colonel Rock and Rocky were named after Ray "Rock" Hanson, a former WIU athletic director and former Marine. As of the Fall of 2009 the men's and women's teams were unified under the Leathernecks name. Previously, the women's teams and athletes at the school were known as Westerwinds.

Western Illinois sports teams participate in the NCAA Division I Ohio Valley Conference as of July 1, 2023. Western Illinois University was a member of the Illinois Intercollegiate Athletic Conference from 1914 to 1970, and a member of the Missouri Valley Football Conference through the 2023 season.
