= Intercollegiate Broadcasting System =

Association of American college radio stations

Intercollegiate Broadcasting System (IBS) is an organization with a membership of over one thousand non-profit, education-affiliated radio stations and webcasters. Founded in 1940, IBS is headquartered in New Windsor, New York, with a legal office in Washington, D.C. In addition to providing support for establishing and operating noncommercial radio and webcast operations, it frequently represents its members with FCC negotiations, copyright issues, and litigation.

== Activities ==
A majority of the over 2,500 educational radio stations do not affiliate nationally, but of the ones that do, IBS represents over 90%. The organization is also a member of the National Association of Broadcasters. The entire staff of IBS is composed of unpaid volunteers.

For over 80 years, IBS has held an annual spring national conference in New York City, at the Hotel Pennsylvania. Part of the convention's proceedings is the announcement of awards presented to outstanding college and high school operations. IBS also holds a series of "Coast-to-Coast Fall Conferences" at select member colleges. As of 2023, the IBS annual conference was moved to the Sheraton Times Square after the demolition of the Hotel Pennsylvania.

== History ==
IBS was founded in 1940, by George Abraham and David W. Borst, who in late 1936 had established the first low-powered AM carrier current radio station on a college campus, "The Brown Network" at Brown University in Providence, Rhode Island. IBS's organizing convention was held at Brown on February 17–18, 1940, and attended by representatives from twelve colleges with existing or proposed carrier current stations. George Abraham was elected the IBS Chairman, Peter Thorpe the Advertising Manager, David Borst the Technical Manager, Joseph Parnicky the Program Manager, and Louis M. Bloch, Jr. the organization's Business Manager. IBS's role was defined as a medium for the exchange of ideas and programs, in addition to working to attract national advertising contracts for the member stations. The first IBS intercollegiate broadcasts began on May 9, 1940, with a five-part series that was carried by stations located throughout New England at Brown, Harvard, Williams, and Wesleyan universities, in addition to the Universities of Connecticut and Rhode Island.

In August 1940, Bloch moved to New York City in order to promote the stations and sign advertising contracts for the then twelve-station organization, known informally as the "Gas Pipe Network". A small office was established at Fifth Avenue and 42nd Street and a rate card prepared, operating under the slogan "From Princeton to Stanford, IBS Sells the Colleges".

Although the initial IBS member stations were all AM carrier current stations that were financed by selling commercials, the organization eventually concentrated on promoting noncommercial educational FM stations. In 1940, the Federal Communications Commission (FCC) established the first band for FM broadcasting, consisting of forty channels occupying 42 to 50 MHz, with five of these channels reserved for educational stations. In 1945 the FM band was moved and expanded to one hundred channels, from 88 to 108 MHz. IBS, in an effort led by U.S. Commissioner of Education John W. Studebaker, organized witnesses to testify on behalf of educational radio, and was instrumental in getting the FCC to secure an FM "reserved band" of twenty education channels from 88.1 to 91.9 MHz. Later, IBS helped promote the establishment of low-power 10-watt Class D licenses, to provide for low cost entry-level noncommercial stations. In later years the organization added webcasting stations to its roster.
