= List of college radio stations in the United States =

The following are radio stations in the United States affiliated with colleges and universities that are regarded as college (student-run) stations. The listings include links to Wikipedia pages on the stations, their parent institutions, and their cities and states of license.

Separate lists are included to differentiate between stations that are licensed by the Federal Communications Commission (FCC) and those that broadcast solely by way of the internet:

- FCC-licensed stations
- Internet stations

== FCC-licensed stations ==
Two broad categories apply to licensed stations owned by U.S. colleges and universities:

- Student-run — Stations where students play significant roles in programming, management, and other facets of operations, either on their own, through student government organizations, or under faculty supervision. Many student-run stations also allow community volunteers to participate as program hosts.
- Public broadcasting — Stations operated either by their parent institutions or in partnership with public broadcasting organizations in the communities or regions they serve. According to their websites, these stations operate as public radio stations with little if any student programming. Therefore, they are not included in the listing.

Call sign	City of license	State	Institution	Frequency
WEGL	Auburn	Alabama	Auburn University	91.1 FM
WLJS	Jacksonville	Alabama	Jacksonville State University	91.9 FM
WJGR-LP	Mobile	Alabama	University of South Alabama	97.1 FM
WVUA	Tuscaloosa	Alabama	University of Alabama	90.7 FM
KRUA	Anchorage	Alaska	University of Alaska Anchorage	88.1 FM
KSUA	Fairbanks	Alaska	University of Alaska Fairbanks	91.5 FM
KLJX-LP	Flagstaff	Arizona	Northern Arizona University	107.1 FM
KAWC	Yuma	Arizona	Arizona Western College	88.9 FM
KOFA	Yuma	Arizona	Arizona Western College	1320 AM
KCAC	Camden	Arkansas	Southern Arkansas University	89.5 FM
KUOZ-LP	Clarksville	Arkansas	University of the Ozarks	100.5 FM
KHDX	Conway	Arkansas	Hendrix College	93.1 FM
KUCA	Conway	Arkansas	University of Central Arkansas	91.3 FM
KBPU	De Queen	Arkansas	University of Arkansas–Cossatot	88.7 FM
KXUA	Fayetteville	Arkansas	University of Arkansas	88.3 FM
KXRJ	Russellville	Arkansas	Arkansas Tech University	91.9 FM
KVHU	Searcy	Arkansas	Harding University	95.3 FM
KRFH-LP	Arcata	California	California State Polytechnic University, Humboldt	105.1 FM
KKJZ	Long Beach	California	California State University, Long Beach	88.1 FM
KALX	Berkeley	California	University of California, Berkeley	90.7 FM
KSPC	Claremont	California	Claremont Colleges	88.7 FM
KDVS	Davis	California	University of California, Davis	90.3 FM
KOHL	Fremont	California	Ohlone College	89.3 FM
KFSR	Fresno	California	California State University, Fresno	90.7 FM
KCRH	Hayward	California	Chabot College	89.9 FM
KUCI	Irvine	California	University of California, Irvine	88.9 FM
KFJC	Los Altos Hills	California	Foothill–De Anza Community College	89.7 FM
KXLU	Los Angeles	California	Loyola Marymount University	88.9 FM
KXSC-AM	Los Angeles	California	University of Southern California	1560 AM
KSMC	Moraga	California	St. Mary's College	89.5 FM
KKSM-AM	Oceanside	California	Palomar College	1320 AM
KGPC-LP	Oakland	California	Peralta Colleges	96.9 FM
KUCR	Riverside	California	University of California, Riverside	88.3 FM
KSJS	San Jose	California	San Jose State University	90.5 FM
KCPR	San Luis Obispo	California	California Polytechnic State University	91.3 FM
KCSB	Santa Barbara	California	University of California, Santa Barbara	91.9 FM
KSCU	Santa Clara	California	Santa Clara University	103.3 FM
KZSC	Santa Cruz	California	University of California, Santa Cruz	88.1 FM
KZSU	Stanford	California	Stanford University	90.1 FM
KWDC-LP	Stockton	California	San Joaquin Delta College	93.5 FM
KCSS	Turlock	California	California State University, Stanislaus	91.9 FM
KSAK	Walnut	California	Mount San Antonio College	90.1 FM
KASF	Alamosa	Colorado	Adams State University	90.9 FM
KVCU-AM	Boulder	Colorado	University of Colorado Boulder	1190 AM
KAFA	Colorado Springs	Colorado	United States Air Force Academy	97.7 FM
KDUR	Durango	Colorado	Fort Lewis College	91.9 FM
KCSU	Fort Collins	Colorado	Colorado State University	90.5 FM
KMSA	Grand Junction	Colorado	Colorado Mesa University	91.3 FM
KWSB	Gunnison	Colorado	Western Colorado University	91.1 FM
KXRE-AM	Manitou Springs	Colorado	Pikes Peak State College	1490 AM
KTSC	Pueblo	Colorado	Colorado State University - Pueblo	89.5 FM
WXCI	Danbury	Connecticut	Western Connecticut State University	91.7 FM
WACC-LP	Enfield	Connecticut	Asnuntuck Community College	107.7 LP
WVOF	Fairfield	Connecticut	Fairfield University	88.5 FM
WQAQ	Hamden	Connecticut	Quinnipiac University	98.1 FM
WRTC	Hartford	Connecticut	Trinity College (Connecticut)	89.3 FM
WESU	Middletown	Connecticut	Wesleyan University	88.1 FM
WFCS	New Britain	Connecticut	Central Connecticut State University	107.7 FM
WCNI	New London	Connecticut	Connecticut College	90.9 FM
WHUS	Storrs	Connecticut	University of Connecticut	91.7 FM
WWUH	West Hartford	Connecticut	University of Hartford	91.3 FM
WNHU	West Haven	Connecticut	University of New Haven	88.7 FM
WECS	Willimantic	Connecticut	Eastern Connecticut State University	90.1 FM
WVUD	Newark	Delaware	University of Delaware	91.3 FM
WHUR-FM	Washington	District of Columbia	Howard University	96.3 FM
WVUM	Coral Gables	Florida	University of Miami	90.5 FM
WIKD-LP	Daytona Beach	Florida	Embry-Riddle Aeronautical University	102.5 FM
WRWS-LP	Daytona Beach	Florida	Bethune-Cookman University	99.1 FM
WRGP	Miami	Florida	Florida International University	88.1 FM
WBUJ-LP	Miami Shores	Florida	Barry University	99.5 FM
WFCF	St. Augustine	Florida	Flagler College	88.5 FM
WANM	Tallahassee	Florida	Florida A&M University	90.5 FM
WVFS	Tallahassee	Florida	Florida State University	89.7 FM
WPRK	Winter Park	Florida	Rollins College	91.5 FM
WASU-LP	Albany	Georgia	Albany State University	92.7 FM
WUOG	Athens	Georgia	University of Georgia	90.5 FM
WCLK	Atlanta	Georgia	Clark Atlanta University	91.9 FM
WRAS	Atlanta	Georgia	Georgia State University	88.5 FM
WREK	Atlanta	Georgia	Georgia Institute of Technology	91.1 FM
WCUG	Columbus	Georgia	Columbus State University	88.5 FM
WBCX	Gainesville	Georgia	Brenau University	89.1 FM
WGUR	Milledgeville	Georgia	Georgia College & State University	95.3 FM
WHCJ	Savannah	Georgia	Savannah State University	90.3 FM
WVGS	Statesboro	Georgia	Georgia Southern University	91.9 FM
WPLH	Tifton	Georgia	Abraham Baldwin Agricultural College	88.3 FM
KUHH-LP	Hilo	Hawaii	University of Hawaii at Hilo	101.1 FM
KTUH	Honolulu	Hawaii	University of Hawaii at Manoa	90.1 FM
KUOI	Moscow	Idaho	University of Idaho	89.3 FM
WESN	Bloomington	Illinois	Illinois Wesleyan University	88.1 FM
WZND-LP	Bloomington	Illinois	Illinois State University	103.3 FM
WPCD	Champaign	Illinois	Parkland College	88.7 FM
WPGU	Champaign	Illinois	University of Illinois at Urbana-Champaign	107.1 FM
WEIU	Charleston	Illinois	Eastern Illinois University	88.9 FM
WCRX	Chicago	Illinois	Columbia College Chicago	88.1 FM
WHPK	Chicago	Illinois	University of Chicago	88.5 FM
WIIT	Chicago	Illinois	Illinois Institute of Technology	88.9 FM
WKKC	Chicago	Illinois	Kennedy-King College	89.3 FM
WLUW	Chicago	Illinois	Loyola University Chicago	88.7 FM
WXAV	Chicago	Illinois	St. Xavier University	88.3 FM
WZRD	Chicago	Illinois	Northeastern Illinois University	88.3 FM
WJMU	Decatur	Illinois	Millikin University	89.5 FM
WSIE	Edwardsville	Illinois	Southern Illinois University - Edwardsville	88.7 FM
WNUR	Evanston	Illinois	Northwestern University	89.3 FM
WLCA	Godfrey	Illinois	Lewis and Clark Community College	89.9 FM
WGRN	Greenville	Illinois	Greenville University	89.5 FM
WCSF	Joliet	Illinois	University of St. Francis	88.7 FM
WMXM	Lake Forest	Illinois	Lake Forest College	88.9 FM
WLRA	Lockport	Illinois	Lewis University	88.1 FM
WIUS	Macomb	Illinois	Western Illinois University	88.3 FM
WLKL	Mattoon	Illinois	Lake Land College	89.9 FM
WVJC	Mount Carmel	Illinois	Illinois Eastern Community Colleges	89.1 FM
WONC	Naperville	Illinois	North Central College	89.1 FM
WHCM	Palatine	Illinois	William Rainey Harper College	88.3 FM
WRRG	River Grove	Illinois	Triton College	88.9 FM
WIUX-LP	Bloomington	Indiana	Indiana University Bloomington	99.1 FM
WNDY	Crawfordsville	Indiana	Wabash College	91.3 FM
WSWI	Evansville	Indiana	University of Southern Indiana	95.7 FM
WGCS	Goshen	Indiana	Goshen College	91.1 FM
WGRE	Greencastle	Indiana	DePauw University	91.5 FM
WQHU-LP	Huntington	Indiana	Huntington University	105.5 FM
WIWU-LP	Marion	Indiana	Indiana Wesleyan University	94.3 FM
WCRD	Muncie	Indiana	Ball State University	91.3 FM
WSND	Notre Dame	Indiana	University of Notre Dame	88.9 FM
WECI	Richmond	Indiana	Earlham College	91.5 FM
WZIS	Terre Haute	Indiana	Indiana State University	90.7 FM
WVUR	Valparaiso	Indiana	Valparaiso University	95.1 FM
KBVU	Alta	Iowa	Buena Vista University	97.5 FM
KURE	Ames	Iowa	Iowa State University	88.5 FM
KULT-LP	Cedar Falls	Iowa	University of Northern Iowa	94.5 FM
KIWR	Council Bluffs	Iowa	Iowa Western Community College	89.7 FM
KWLC-AM	Decorah	Iowa	Luther College	1240 AM
KZOW	Forest City	Idaho	Waldorf University	91.9 FM
KICB	Fort Dodge	Iowa	Iowa Central Community College	88.1 FM
KDIC	Grinnell	Iowa	Grinnell College	88.5 FM
KSTM	Indianola	Iowa	Simpson College	88.9 FM
KRUI	Iowa City	Iowa	University of Iowa	89.7 FM
KWAR	Waverly	Iowa	Wartburg College	89.9 FM
KWPU	Oskaloosa	Iowa	William Penn University	90.5 FM
KMSC	Sioux City	Iowa	Morningside University	92.9 FM
KTCC	Colby	Kansas	Colby Community College	91.9 FM
KVCO	Concordia	Kansas	Cloud County Community College	88.3 FM
KBTL	El Dorado	Kansas	Butler Community College	88.1 FM
KJHK	Lawrence	Kansas	University of Kansas	90.7 FM
KSDB	Manhattan	Kansas	Kansas State University	91.9 FM
KBCU	North Newton	Kansas	Bethel College	88.1 FM
KSWC-LP	Winfield	Kansas	Southwestern College	94.7 FM
WWHR	Bowling Green	Kentucky	Western Kentucky University	91.7 FM
WRVG	Georgetown	Kentucky	Georgetown College	93.7 FM
WRFL	Lexington	Kentucky	University of Kentucky	88.1 FM
WKWC	Owensboro	Kentucky	Kentucky Wesleyan College	90.3 FM
KLSU	Baton Rouge	Louisiana	Louisiana State University Tigers	91.1 FM
KRVS-HD2	Lafayette	Louisiana	University of Louisiana at Lafayette	88.7 HD2
KGRM	Grambling	Louisiana	Grambling State University	91.5 FM
KSLU	Hammond	Louisiana	Southeastern Louisiana University	90.9 FM
KBYS	Lake Charles	Louisiana	McNeese State University	88.3 FM
KXUL	Monroe	Louisiana	University of Louisiana at Monroe	91.1 FM
KNWD	Natchitoches	Louisiana	Northwestern State University of Louisiana	91.7 FM
WTUL	New Orleans	Louisiana	Tulane University	91.5 FM
WXDR-LP	New Orleans	Louisiana	Delgado Community College	99.1 FM
KZLC-LP	Pineville	Louisiana	Louisiana Christian University	95.5 FM
KLPI	Ruston	Louisiana	Louisiana Tech University	89.1 FM
KNSU	Thibodaux	Louisiana	Nicholls State University	91.5 FM
WHSN	Bangor	Maine	Husson University	89.3 FM
WBOR	Brunswick	Maine	Bowdoin College	91.1 FM
WUMF	Farmington	Maine	University of Maine at Farmington	91.5 FM
WRBC	Lewiston	Maine	Bates College	91.5 FM
WUMM	Machias	Maine	University of Maine at Machias	91.1 FM
WMEB	Orono	Maine	University of Maine	91.9 FM
WMPG	Portland	Maine	University of Southern Maine	90.9 FM
WUPI	Presque Isle	Maine	University of Maine at Presque Isle	91.1 FM
WMHB	Waterville	Maine	Colby College	89.7 FM
WLOY-AM	Baltimore	Maryland	Loyola University Maryland	1620 AM
WHFC	Bel Air	Maryland	Harford Community College	91.1 FM
WMUC	College Park	Maryland	University of Maryland, College Park	90.5 FM
WMTB	Emmitsburg	Maryland	Mount St. Mary's University	89.9 FM
WXSU-LP	Salisbury	Maryland	Salisbury University	95.3 FM
WAMH	Amherst	Massachusetts	Amherst College	89.3 FM
WMUA	Amherst	Massachusetts	University of Massachusetts Amherst	91.1 FM
WERS	Boston	Massachusetts	Emerson College	88.9 FM
WRBB	Boston	Massachusetts	Northeastern University	104.9 FM
WTBU	Boston	Massachusetts	Boston University	89.3 FM
WTBU-AM	Boston	Massachusetts	Boston University	640 AM
WZBC	Boston	Massachusetts	Boston College	90.3 FM
WBIM	Bridgewater	Massachusetts	Bridgewater State University	91.5 FM
WHRB	Cambridge	Massachusetts	Harvard College	95.3 FM
WMBR	Cambridge	Massachusetts	Massachusetts Institute of Technology	88.1 FM
WNRC-LP	Dudley	Massachusetts	Nichols College	97.5 FM
WSHL	Easton	Massachusetts	Stonehill College	91.3 FM
WXPL	Fitchburg	Massachusetts	Fitchburg State University	91.3 FM
WDJM	Framingham	Massachusetts	Framingham State College	91.3
WGAO	Franklin	Massachusetts	Dean College	88.3 FM
WCCH-LP	Holyoke	Massachusetts	Holyoke Community College	103.5 FM
WUML	Lowell	Massachusetts	University of Massachusetts Lowell	91.5 FM
WMFO	Medford	Massachusetts	Tufts University	91.5 FM
WMLN	Milton	Massachusetts	Curry College	91.5 FM
WLAS-LP	Newton	Massachusetts	Lasell University	102.9 FM
WJJW	North Adams	Massachusetts	Massachusetts College of Liberal Arts	91.1 FM
WOZQ	Northampton	Massachusetts	Smith College	91.9 FM
WMWM	Salem	Massachusetts	Salem State University	91.7 FM
WMHC	South Hadley	Massachusetts	Mount Holyoke College	91.5 FM
WBRS	Waltham	Massachusetts	Brandeis University	100.1 FM
WZLY	Wellesley	Massachusetts	Wellesley College	91.5 FM
WKKL	West Barnstable	Massachusetts	Cape Cod Community College	90.7 FM
WSKB	Westfield	Massachusetts	Westfield State University	89.5 FM
WCFM	Williamstown	Massachusetts	Williams College	91.9 FM
WCHC	Worcester	Massachusetts	College of the Holy Cross	88.1 FM
WVAC	Adrian	Michigan	Adrian College	107.9 FM
WCBN	Ann Arbor	Michigan	University of Michigan	88.3 FM
WXOU	Auburn Hills	Michigan	Oakland University	88.3 FM
WHFR	Dearborn	Michigan	Henry Ford Community College	89.3 FM
WDBM	East Lansing	Michigan	Michigan State University	88.9 FM
WKUF-LP	Flint	Michigan	Kettering University	94.3 FM
WRFH-LP	Hillsdale	Michigan	Hillsdale College	101.7 FM
WTHS	Holland	Michigan	Hope College	89.9 FM
WMTU	Houghton	Michigan	Michigan Technological University	91.9 FM
WIDR	Kalamazoo	Michigan	Western Michigan University	89.1 FM
WEMU	Ypsilanti	Michigan	Eastern Michigan University	89.1 FM
WUPX	Marquette	Michigan	Northern Michigan University	91.5 FM
WMHW	Mt. Pleasant	Michigan	Central Michigan University	91.5 FM
KBSB	Bemidji	Minnesota	Bemidji State University	89.7 FM
KMSU	Mankato	Minnesota	Minnesota State University, Mankato	89.7 FM
KUOM-AM	Minneapolis	Minnesota	University of Minnesota	770 AM
KUMM	Morris	Minnesota	University of Minnesota Morris	89.7 FM
KRLX	Northfield	Minnesota	Carleton College	88.1 FM
KVSC	St. Cloud	Minnesota	St. Cloud State University	88.1 FM
WMCN	Saint Paul	Minnesota	Macalester College	91.7 FM
KQAL	Winona	Minnesota	Winona State University	89.5 FM
WDSW-LP	Cleveland	Mississippi	Delta State University	88.1 FM
WMUW	Columbus	Mississippi	Mississippi University for Women	88.5 FM
WUSM	Hattiesburg	Mississippi	University of Southern Mississippi	88.5 FM
WVSD	Itta Bena	Mississippi	Mississippi Valley State University	91.7 FM
KCOU	Columbia	Missouri	University of Missouri	88.1 FM
KWWU-LP	Fulton	Missouri	William Woods University	94.9 FM
KMVC	Marshall	Missouri	Missouri Valley University	91.7 FM
KZLX-LP	Maryville	Missouri	Northwest Missouri State University	106.7 FM
KDRU-LP	Springfield	Missouri	Drury University	98.1 FM
WGTC-LP	Mayhew	Mississippi	East Mississippi Community College	92.7 FM
WUMS	Oxford	Mississippi	University of Mississippi	92.1 FM
WMSV	Starkville	Mississippi	Mississippi State University	91.1 FM
KTRM	Kirksville	Missouri	Truman State University	88.7 FM
KGSP	Parkville	Missouri	Park University	90.5 FM
KMNR	Rolla	Missouri	Missouri University of Science and Technology	89.7 FM
KCFV	St. Louis	Missouri	St. Louis Community College	89.5 FM
KWUR	St. Louis	Missouri	Washington University in St. Louis	90.3 FM
KGLT	Bozeman	Montana	Montana State University	97.1 FM
KBGA	Missoula	Montana	University of Montana	89.9 FM
KNMC	Havre	Montana	Montana State University-Northern	90.1 FM
KDNE	Crete	Nebraska	Doane University	91.9 FM
KCNT	Hastings	Nebraska	Central Community College	88.1 FM
KLPR	Kearney	Nebraska	University of Nebraska at Kearney	91.1 FM
KRNU	Lincoln	Nebraska	University of Nebraska–Lincoln	90.3 FM
WUNH	Durham	New Hampshire	University of New Hampshire	91.3 FM
WNEC	Henniker	New Hampshire	New England College	91.7 FM
WKNH	Keene	New Hampshire	Keene State College	91.3 FM
WPCR	Plymouth	New Hampshire	Plymouth State University	91.7 FM
WFPC-LP	Rindge	New Hampshire	Franklin Pierce University	105.3 FM
KWSC	Wayne	Nebraska	Wayne State College	91.9 FM
WDBK	Camden	New Jersey	Camden County College	91.5 FM
WGLS	Glassboro	New Jersey	Rowan University	89.7 FM
WRML-LP	Hamilton	New Jersey	Atlantic Cape Community College	107.9 FM
WRRC	Lawrenceville	New Jersey	Rider University	107.7 FM
WRPR	Mahwah	New Jersey	Ramapo College	90.3 FM
WRSU	New Brunswick	New Jersey	Rutgers University–New Brunswick	88.7 FM
WVPH	Piscataway	New Jersey	Rutgers University–New Brunswick	90.3 FM
WLFR	Pomona	New Jersey	Stockton University	91.7 FM
WPRB	Princeton	New Jersey	Princeton University	103.3 FM
WSOU	South Orange	New Jersey	Seton Hall University	89.5 FM
WFDU	Teaneck	New Jersey	Fairleigh Dickinson University	89.1 FM
WTSR	Trenton	New Jersey	The College of New Jersey	91.3 FM
WKNJ	Union	New Jersey	Kean University	90.3 FM
WMSC	Upper Montclair	New Jersey	Montclair State University	90.3 FM
WPSC	Wayne	New Jersey	William Paterson University	88.7 FM
WMCX	West Long Branch	New Jersey	Monmouth University	88.9 FM
KRUX	Las Cruces	New Mexico	New Mexico State University	91.5 FM
WCDB	Albany	New York	University at Albany	90.9 FM
WALF	Alfred	New York	Alfred University	89.7 FM
WDWN	Auburn	New York	Cayuga County Community College	89.1 FM
WHRW	Binghamton	New York	Binghamton University	90.5 FM
WBSU	Brockport	New York	State University of New York at Brockport	89.1 FM
WCWP	Brookville	New York	LIU Post (formerly C. W. Post College)	88.1 FM
WBNY	Buffalo	New York	Buffalo State University	91.3 FM
WHCL	Clinton	New York	Hamilton College	88.7 FM
WSUC	Cortland	New York	State University of New York at Cortland	90.5 FM
WECW	Elmira	New York	Elmira College	107.7 FM
WCVF	Fredonia	New York	State University of New York at Fredonia	88.9 FM
WHPC	Garden City	New York	Nassau Community College	90.3 FM
WGSU	Geneseo	New York	State University of New York at Geneseo	89.3 FM
WHWS-LP	Geneva	New York	Hobart and William Smith Colleges	105.7 FM
WGFR	Glens Falls	New York	SUNY Adirondack	92.7 FM
WRCU	Hamilton	New York	Colgate University	90.1 FM
WRHU	Hempstead	New York	Hofstra University	88.7 FM
WVHC	Herkimer	New York	Herkimer College	91.5 FM
WICB	Ithaca	New York	Ithaca College	91.7 FM
WVBR	Ithaca	New York	Cornell University	93.5 FM
WVCR	Loudonville	New York	Siena University	88.3 FM
WFNP	New Paltz	New York	State University of New York at New Paltz	88.7 FM
WHCR	New York	New York	City College of New York	90.1 FM
WKCR	New York	New York	Columbia University	89.9 FM
WKRB	New York	New York	Kingsborough Community College	90.3 FM
WNYU	New York	New York	New York University	89.1 FM
WSBU	Olean	New York	St. Bonaventure University	88.3 FM
WONY	Oneonta	New York	State University of New York at Oneonta	90.9 FM
WNYO	Oswego	New York	State University of New York at Oswego	88.9 FM
WRHO	Oneonta	New York	Hartwick College	89.7 FM
WTSC	Potsdam	New York	Clarkson University	91.1 FM
WVKR-FM	Poughkeepsie	New York	Vassar College	91.3 FM
WITR	Rochester	New York	Rochester Institute of Technology	89.7 FM
WRUR	Rochester	New York	University of Rochester	88.5 FM
WSPN	Saratoga	New York	Skidmore College	91.1 FM
WRUC	Schenectady	New York	Union College	89.7 FM
WSIA	Staten Island	New York	College of Staten Island	88.9 FM
WUSB	Stony Brook	New York	Stony Brook University	90.1 FM
WERW-AM	Syracuse	New York	Syracuse University	1670 AM
WJPZ	Syracuse	New York	Syracuse University	89.1 FM
WRPI	Troy	New York	Rensselaer Polytechnic Institute	91.5 FM
WPNR	Utica	New York	Utica University	90.7 FM
WARY	Valhalla	New York	Westchester Community College	88.1 FM
WASU	Boone	North Carolina	Appalachian State University	90.5 FM
WXYC	Chapel Hill	North Carolina	University of North Carolina at Chapel Hill	89.3 FM
WWCU	Cullowhee	North Carolina	Western Carolina University	95.3 FM
WXDU	Durham	North Carolina	Duke University	88.7 FM
WSOE	Elon	North Carolina	Elon University	89.3 FM
WNAA	Greensboro	North Carolina	North Carolina A&T State University	90.1 FM
WQFS	Greensboro	North Carolina	Guilford College	90.9 FM
WUAG	Greensboro	North Carolina	University of North Carolina at Greensboro	103.1 FM
WZMB	Greenville	North Carolina	East Carolina University	91.3 FM
WUAW	Lillington	North Carolina	Central Carolina Community College	88.3 FM
WKNC	Raleigh	North Carolina	North Carolina State University	88.1 FM
WLJZ-LP	Salisbury	North Carolina	Livingstone College	107.1 FM
WDCC	Sanford	North Carolina	Central Carolina Community College	90.5 FM
WFOZ-LP	Winston-Salem	North Carolina	Forsyth Technical Community College	105.1 FM
KNDS-LP	Fargo	North Dakota	North Dakota State University	96.3 FM
WZIP	Akron	Ohio	University of Akron	88.1 FM
WRMU	Alliance	Ohio	University of Mount Union	91.1 FM
WRDL	Ashland	Ohio	Ashland University	88.9 FM
WOUB-FM	Athens	Ohio	Ohio University	91.3 FM
WBWH-LP	Bluffton	Ohio	Bluffton University	96.1 FM
WBGU	Bowling Green	Ohio	Bowling Green State University	88.1 FM
WBWC	Cleveland	Ohio	Baldwin-Wallace College	88.3 FM
WCSB	Cleveland	Ohio	Cleveland State University	89.3 FM
WJCU	Cleveland	Ohio	John Carroll University	88.7 FM
WRUW	Cleveland	Ohio	Case Western Reserve University	91.1 FM
WUDR	Dayton	Ohio	University of Dayton	98.1 FM
WWSU	Dayton	Ohio	Wright State University	106.9 FM
WLFC	Findlay	Ohio	University of Findlay	88.3 FM
WKCO	Gambier	Ohio	Kenyon College	91.9 FM
WOSX	Granville	Ohio	Ohio State University	91.1 FM
WCMO-LP	Marietta	Ohio	Marietta College	98.5 FM
WMRT	Marietta	Ohio	Marietta College	88.3 FM
WLCI-LP	Nelsonville	Ohio	Hocking College	97.5 FM
WMCO	New Concord	Ohio	Muskingum University	90.7 FM
WOBC	Oberlin	Ohio	Oberlin College	91.5 FM
WXUT	Toledo	Ohio	University of Toledo	88.3 FM
WOBN	Westerville	Ohio	Otterbein University	97.5 FM
KRSC	Claremore	Oklahoma	Rogers State University	91.3 FM
KSSU	Durant	Oklahoma	Southeastern Oklahoma State University	91.9 FM
KZUC-LP	Edmond	Oklahoma	University of Central Oklahoma	99.3 FM
KALU	Langston	Oklahoma	Langston University	89.3 FM
KWLB	Red Oak	Oklahoma	Eastern Oklahoma State College	93.1 FM
KAYE	Tonkawa	Oklahoma	Northern Oklahoma College	90.7 FM
KBVR	Corvallis	Oregon	Oregon State University	88.7 FM
KWVA	Eugene	Oregon	University of Oregon	88.1 FM
KTEC	Klamath Falls	Oregon	Oregon Institute of Technology	89.5 FM
WMUH	Allentown	Pennsylvania	Muhlenberg College	91.7 FM
WNUW-LP	Aston	Pennsylvania	Neumann University	98.5 FM
WHSK	Bloomsburg	Pennsylvania	Commonwealth University-Bloomsburg	91.1 FM
WCAL	California	Pennsylvania	PennWest California	91.9 FM
WDCV	Carlisle	Pennsylvania	Dickinson College	88.3 FM
WCUC	Clarion	Pennsylvania	PennWest Clarion	91.7 FM
WESS	East Stroudsburg	Pennsylvania	East Stroudsburg University	90.3 FM
WJRH	Easton	Pennsylvania	Lafayette College	104.9 FM
WFSE	Edinboro	Pennsylvania	PennWest Edinboro	88.9 FM
WWEC	Elizabethtown	Pennsylvania	Elizabethtown College	88.3 FM
WERG	Erie	Pennsylvania	Gannon University	90.5 FM
WZBT	Gettysburg	Pennsylvania	Gettysburg College	91.1 FM
WVMM	Grantham	Pennsylvania	Messiah University	90.7 FM
WSAJ	Grove City	Pennsylvania	Grove City College	91.1 FM
WIUP	Indiana	Pennsylvania	Indiana University of Pennsylvania	90.1 FM
WKCV-LP	La Plume	Pennsylvania	Keystone College	103.5 FM
WFNM	Lancaster	Pennsylvania	Franklin and Marshall College	89.1 FM
WNTE	Mansfield	Pennsylvania	Commonwealth University-Mansfield	89.5 FM
WARC	Meadville	Pennsylvania	Allegheny College	90.3 FM
WIXQ	Millersville	Pennsylvania	Millersville University of Pennsylvania	91.7 FM
WSFX	Nanticoke	Pennsylvania	Luzerne County Community College	91.5 FM
WKDU	Philadelphia	Pennsylvania	Drexel University	91.7 FM
WPTS	Pittsburgh	Pennsylvania	University of Pittsburgh	92.1 FM
WRCT-FM	Pittsburgh	Pennsylvania	Carnegie Mellon University	88.3 FM
WXAC	Reading	Pennsylvania	Albright College	91.3 FM
WVMW	Scranton	Pennsylvania	Marywood University	91.7 FM
WSYC	Shippensburg	Pennsylvania	Shippensburg University of Pennsylvania	88.7 FM
WUSR	Scranton,	Pennsylvania	University of Scranton	99.5 FM
WQSU	Selinsgrove	Pennsylvania	Susquehanna University	88.9 FM
WSRU	Slippery Rock	Pennsylvania	Slippery Rock University	88.1 FM
WKPS	State College	Pennsylvania	Pennsylvania State University	90.7 FM
WSRN	Swarthmore	Pennsylvania	Swarthmore College	91.5 FM
WNJR	Washington	Pennsylvania	Washington and Jefferson College	91.7 FM
WCUR	West Chester	Pennsylvania	West Chester University	91.7 FM
WCLH	Wilkes-Barre	Pennsylvania	Wilkes University	90.7 FM
WRKC	Wilkes-Barre	Pennsylvania	King's College	88.5 FM
WRLC	Williamsport	Pennsylvania	Lycoming College	91.7 FM
WXVU	Villanova	Pennsylvania	Villanova University	89.1 FM
WVYC	York	Pennsylvania	York College of Pennsylvania	88.1 FM
WQRI	Bristol	Rhode Island	Roger Williams University	88.3 FM
WRIU	Kingston	Rhode Island	University of Rhode Island	90.3 FM
WBRU-LP	Providence	Rhode Island	Brown University	101.1 FM
WDOM	Providence	Rhode Island	Providence College	91.3 FM
WSBF	Clemson	South Carolina	Clemson University	88.1 FM
WPCX-LP	Clinton	South Carolina	Presbyterian College	97.1 FM
WUSC	Columbia	South Carolina	University of South Carolina	90.5 FM
WNIR-LP	Newberry	South Carolina	Newberry College	95.5 FM
WNGR-LP	Tigerville	South Carolina	North Greenville University	95.5 FM
KAOR	Vermillion	South Dakota	University of South Dakota	91.1 FM
KBHU	Spearfish	South Dakota	Black Hills State University	89.1 FM
KJKT	Spearfish	South Dakota	Black Hills State University	90.7 FM
KSDJ	Brookings	South Dakota	South Dakota State University	90.7 FM
KTEQ	Rapid City	South Dakota	South Dakota School of Mines & Technology	91.3 FM
WAPX	Clarksville	Tennessee	Austin Peay State University	91.9 FM
WTTU	Cookeville	Tennessee	Tennessee Tech	88.5 FM
WVCP	Gallatin	Tennessee	Volunteer State Community College	88.5 FM
WLCD-LP	Jackson	Tennessee	Lane College	98.7 FM
WUTK	Knoxville	Tennessee	University of Tennessee	90.3 FM
WUTM	Martin	Tennessee	University of Tennessee at Martin	90.3 FM
WUMC	Milligan College	Tennessee	Milligan University	90.5 FM
WYXR	Memphis	Tennessee	University of Memphis	104.5 FM
WMTS	Murfreesboro	Tennessee	Middle Tennessee State University	88.3 FM
KACC	Alvin	Texas	Alvin Community College	89.7 FM
KACV	Alvin	Texas	Amarillo College	89.9 FM
KVRX	Austin	Texas	University of Texas at Austin	91.7 FM
KWTS	Canyon	Texas	West Texas A&M University	91.1 FM
KNTU	Denton	Texas	University of North Texas	88.1 FM
KTCU	Fort Worth	Texas	Texas Christian University	88.7 FM
KTRU-LP	Houston	Texas	Rice University	96.1 LP
KSHU	Huntsville	Texas	Sam Houston State University	91.1 FM
KTAI	Kingsville	Texas	Texas A&M University–Kingsville	88.1 FM
KTXT	Lubbock	Texas	Texas Tech University	88.1 FM
KBWC	Marshall	Texas	Wiley College	91.1 FM
KAXM	Nacogdoches	Texas	Stephen F. Austin State University	90.1 FM
KSYM	San Antonio	Texas	San Antonio College	90.1 FM
KTSW	San Marcos	Texas	Texas State University	89.9 FM
KGWB	Snyder	Texas	Western Texas College	91.1 FM
KXTR-LP	Stephenville	Texas	Tarleton State University	100.7 FM
KSUU	Cedar City	Utah	Southern Utah University	91.1 FM
KAGJ	Ephraim	Utah	Snow College	88.9 FM
KBLU-LP	Logan	Utah	Utah State University	92.3 FM
KUTU	Santa Clara	Utah	Utah Tech University	91.3 FM
KCWC	Riverton	Wyoming	Central Wyoming College	88.1 FM
WRUV	Burlington	Vermont	University of Vermont	90.1 FM
WWPV-LP	Colchester	Vermont	Saint Michael's College	92.5 FM
WGDH	Hardwick	Vermont	Goddard College	91.7 FM
WJSC	Johnson	Vermont	Northern Vermont University	90.7 FM
WRMC	Middlebury	Vermont	Middlebury College	91.1 FM
WVTC	Randolph Center	Vermont	Vermont State University, Randolph	90.7 FM
WUVT	Blacksburg	Virginia	Virginia Tech	90.7 FM
WXTJ-LP	Charlottesville	Virginia	University of Virginia	100.1 FM
WMLU	Farmville	Virginia	Longwood University	91.3 FM
WHOV	Hampton	Virginia	Hampton University	88.1 FM
WXJM	Harrisonburg	Virginia	James Madison University	88.7 FM
WLUR	Lexington	Virginia	Washington and Lee University	91.5 FM
WVST	Petersburg	Virginia	Virginia State University	91.3 FM
WDCE	Richmond	Virginia	University of Richmond	90.1 FM
WRKE-LP	Salem,	Virginia	Roanoke College	100.3 FM
WCWM	Williamsburg	Virginia	College of William & Mary	90.9 FM
KUGS	Bellingham	Washington	Western Washington University	89.3 FM
KCED	Centralia	Washington	Centralia College	91.3 FM
KCWU	Ellensburg	Washington	Central Washington University	88.1 FM
KRGM	Enumclaw	Washington	Green River College	1330 AM
KGRG-FM	Auburn	Washington	Green River College	89.9 FM
KAOS	Olympia	Washington	Evergreen State College	89.3 FM
KZUU	Pullman	Washington	Washington State University	90.7 FM
KXSU-LP	Seattle	Washington	Seattle University	102.1 FM
KUPS	Tacoma	Washington	University of Puget Sound	90.1 FM
KWCW	Walla Walla	Washington	Whitman College	90.5 FM
WWVU	Morgantown	West Virginia	West Virginia University	91.7 FM
WPKM-LP	Parkersburg	West Virginia	West Virginia University at Parkersburg	96.3 FM
WSHC	Shepherdstown	West Virginia	Shepherd University	89.7 FM
WGLZ	West Liberty	West Virginia	West Liberty University	91.5 FM
WBCR	Beloit	Wisconsin	Beloit College	90.3 FM
WSUM	Madison	Wisconsin	University of Wisconsin–Madison	91.7 FM
WMSE	Milwaukee	Wisconsin	Milwaukee School of Engineering	91.7 FM
WRST	Oshkosh	Wisconsin	University of Wisconsin-Oshkosh	90.3 FM
WSUP	Platteville	Wisconsin	University of Wisconsin–Platteville	90.5 FM
WWSP	Stevens Point	Wisconsin	University of Wisconsin–Stevens Point	89.9 FM

== Internet stations ==
Following are radio stations affiliated with U.S. colleges and universities that only broadcast over the internet, a form of transmission also referred to as webcasting. None of the stations listed possess the FCC licenses required for terrestrial broadcasting (using radio waves). Most licensed college stations simulcast their programming using both means.

Identity	City	State	Institution
KASU	Jonesboro	Arkansas	Arkansas State
KAMP	Tucson	Arizona	University of Arizona
KOXY	Los Angeles	California	Occidental College
COD	Palm Springs	California	College of the Desert
KCR	San Diego	California	San Diego State University
KSDT	San Diego	California	University of California, San Diego
KUSF	San Francisco	California	University of San Francisco
WCUA	Washington	District of Columbia	The Catholic University of America
WGTB	Washington	District of Columbia	Georgetown University
WRGW	Washington	District of Columbia	George Washington University
WVAU	Washington	District of Columbia	American University
WCCR	West Lafayette	Indiana	Purdue University
WILY	West Lafayette	Indiana	Purdue University
WVFI	South Bend	Indiana	University of Notre Dame
WMHD	Terre Haute	Indiana	Rose-Hulman Institute of Technology
KALA	Davenport	Iowa	St. Ambrose University
KRNL	Mount Vernon	Iowa	Cornell College
WRBC	Lewiston	Maine	Bates College
WJHU	Baltimore	Maryland	Johns Hopkins University
WMBC	Baltimore	Maryland	University of Maryland: Baltimore County
WECB	Boston	Massachusetts	Emerson College
WLSO	Sault Sainte Marie	Michigan	Lake Superior State University
KSLU	St. Louis	Missouri	Saint Louis University
WXBC	Annandale-on-Hudson	New York	Bard College
WBAR	New York City	New York	Barnard College
WNYT	Old Westbury	New York	New York Institute of Technology
WQKE	Plattsburgh	New York	State University of New York at Plattsburgh
WLMU	Syracuse	New York	Le Moyne College
WFAL	Bowling Green	Ohio	Bowling Green State University
WMSR	Oxford	Ohio	Miami University
WXCU	Columbus	Ohio	Capital University
WQHS	Philadelphia	Pennsylvania	University of Pennsylvania
WXLV	Schnecksville	Pennsylvania	Lehigh Carbon Community College
WXIN	Providence	Rhode Island	Rhode Island College
WCCU	Conway	South Carolina	Coastal Carolina University
WPLS	Greenville	South Carolina	Furman University
KDSU	Madison	South Dakota	Dakota State University
WRVU	Nashville	Tennessee	Vanderbilt University
K-UTE	Salt Lake City	Utah	University of Utah
WLMC	Putney	Vermont	Landmark College
WODU	Norfolk	Virginia	Old Dominion University
WVCW	Richmond	Virginia	Virginia Commonwealth University

== See also ==
- AM broadcasting
- FM broadcasting
- Internet radio
- List of community radio stations in the United States
- List of internet radio stations
- List of NPR stations
- List of Pacifica Radio stations and affiliates
- List of radio stations in the United States
- Low-power broadcasting
- Radio format
