= WRTC =

WRTC can refer to:

- WRTC-FM, a radio station located in Hartford, Connecticut
- Walter Rand Transportation Center, a transit hub in Camden, New Jersey
- Waterford Regional Technical College, a college in Waterford, Ireland
- World Radiosport Team Championship
- School of Writing, Rhetoric and Technical Communication, a department at James Madison University
- Wind River Tribal College, a college in Fort Washakie, Wyoming
- Washington Regional Transplant Community, referenced in A Life Everlasting by Sarah Gray
