= KBYS =

KBYS may refer to:

- KBYS (FM), a radio station (88.3 FM) licensed to serve Lake Charles, Louisiana, United States
- Bicycle Lake Army Airfield (ICAO code KBYS)
