= KTSC =

KTSC may refer to:

- KTSC-FM, a radio station (89.5 FM) licensed to Pueblo, Colorado, United States
- KTSC (TV), a television station (channel 26) licensed to Pueblo, Colorado, United States
