= KCAC =

KCAC may refer to:

- Kansas City Athletic Club, an athletic club in Kansas City, Kansas
- Kansas Collegiate Athletic Conference, an NAIA collegiate athletic conference based in Kansas
- Kovalchick Convention and Athletic Complex, a convention and athletic center at Indiana University of Pennsylvania
- KCAC (FM), a radio station (89.5 FM) licensed to Camden, Arkansas, United States
- Knesset Christian Allies Caucus, a caucus within the Israeli Knesset
- Kurdistan Center for Arts and Culture (KCAC), an arts and culture organization based in Kurdistan Region
- KXXT, a radio station (1010 AM) in Phoenix, Arizona known as KCAC from 1961 to 1971
