= KBLU-LP =

- Logan, Utah; United States
- Frequency: 92.3 MHz
- Branding: Aggie Radio

Programming
- Format: Freeform

Ownership
- Owner: Utah State University; (Aggie Radio)

Technical information
- Licensing authority: FCC
- Facility ID: 194269
- Class: LP1
- ERP: 96 watts
- HAAT: −204 metres (−669 ft)
- Transmitter coordinates: 41°44′42.8″N 111°48′18.8″W

Links
- Public license information: LMS
- Webcast: Listen live
- Website: radio.usu.edu

KBLU-LP (92.3 FM, "Aggie Radio") is a student-run radio station licensed to serve the community of Logan, Utah. The station is owned by Utah State University, through licensee Aggie Radio, and airs a freeform radio format.

The station was assigned the KBLU-LP call letters by the Federal Communications Commission on March 12, 2015.

== See also ==
- Campus radio
- List of college radio stations in the United States
