= KAOR =

- Vermillion, South Dakota, United States; United States
- Frequency: 91.1 MHz
- Branding: Coyote Radio

Programming
- Format: College
- Affiliations: Student media The Volante; Coyote News

Ownership
- Owner: The University of South Dakota

History
- First air date: May 24, 1985
- Former call signs: KUSD

Technical information
- Licensing authority: FCC
- Facility ID: 66605
- Class: A
- ERP: 120 watts
- HAAT: 32 meters (105 ft)
- Transmitter coordinates: 42°47′1″N 96°55′26″W

Links
- Public license information: Public file; LMS
- Webcast: Listen live
- Website: KAOR website

KAOR (91.1 FM, "Coyote Radio") is an American student-run non-commercial educational radio station licensed to serve Vermillion, South Dakota, United States. The station is owned by the University of South Dakota.

Staffed by full-time students from a wide variety of majors and overseen by the Media & Journalism Department of the College of Arts & Sciences, KAOR broadcasts 24 hours a day. Since 2003, KAOR has broadcast from studios located in the Al Neuharth Media Center on the University of South Dakota campus. The station broadcasts an alternative music format along with sports coverage and talk shows.

== History ==
This station received its original construction permit from the Federal Communications Commission on May 24, 1985. The new station was assigned the call letters KAOR by the FCC on August 8, 1985. KAOR received its license to cover from the FCC on November 9, 1987. The station formerly operated as KUSD before the call letters transferred to South Dakota Public Broadcasting.

== Programming ==
KAOR Radio allows students to broadcast shows of their choosing including music, talk, and sports. The KAOR Sports Department also provides live broadcasts of every USD home football, volleyball and basketball game.

== See also ==
- Campus radio
- List of college radio stations in the United States
