= KUCR =

Radio station at the University of California, Riverside

- Riverside, California; United States
- Broadcast area: Riverside; San Bernardino
- Frequency: 88.3 MHz
- Branding: 88.3 KUCR

Programming
- Format: College Radio

Ownership
- Owner: University of California Riverside

History
- First air date: 1966
- Call sign meaning: "University of California Riverside"

Technical information
- Licensing authority: FCC
- Facility ID: 66318
- Class: A
- ERP: 150 watts
- HAAT: 494 meters (1,621 ft)
- Transmitter coordinates: 33°57′58.1″N 117°17′17.1″W

Links
- Public license information: Public file; LMS
- Webcast: Listen live
- Website: kucr.org

KUCR (88.3 FM) is a non-commercial college radio station at the University of California, Riverside, in Riverside, California, United States, where its studios and transmitter are separately located in Riverside County, with its on West Linden Street in Riverside and its transmitter atop Box Springs Mountain in Moreno Valley.

== See also ==
- Campus radio
- List of college radio stations in the United States
