= WALF =

- Alfred, New York; United States
- Frequency: 89.7 MHz

Programming
- Format: Variety

Ownership
- Owner: Alfred University

History
- First air date: November 1971
- Call sign meaning: Alfred

Technical information
- Facility ID: 973
- Class: A
- ERP: 200 watts
- HAAT: −6.0 meters (−19.7 ft)
- Transmitter coordinates: 42°15′17.00″N 77°47′13.00″W

Links
- Webcast: listen live
- Website: walf.fm

WALF (89.7 FM) is a student-run radio station broadcasting a variety format of content. Licensed in Alfred, New York, United States, the station serves the Alfred area. The station is owned by Alfred University.

== History ==
WALF-FM started in November 1971 in the basement of 6 Sayles Street, and has since moved twice, to Steinheim in the mid-1970s, and then to its present location in the Powell Campus Center where it opened in 1993.

WALF, which is run by students, airs a freeform genre, allowing program hosts to play what they want within Federal Communications Commission regulations). The students produce most of the station's shows from 9 a.m.–2 a.m. In addition to the student staff, some programs are hosted by faculty members and community volunteers.

== See also ==
- College radio
- List of college radio stations in the United States
