= KRUX =

Student radio station at New Mexico State University

- United States
- Broadcast area: Las Cruces, New Mexico, United States
- Frequency: 91.5 MHz
- Branding: 91.5-FM KRUX

Programming
- Format: College radio/Eclectic

Ownership
- Owner: New Mexico State University

History
- First air date: 1989

Technical information
- Licensing authority: FCC
- Facility ID: 4209
- Class: A
- ERP: 1,900 watts
- HAAT: −41.5 meters (−136 ft)
- Transmitter coordinates: 32°16′58.9″N 106°44′51.7″W

Links
- Public license information: Public file; LMS
- Webcast: Listen Live
- Website: kruxradio.com

KRUX (91.5 FM) is one of New Mexico State University's two radio stations, located in Las Cruces, New Mexico, United States. Student-run and operated, it airs an eclectic mix of musical genres. KRUX was the first non-commercial educational FM station to go on the air in Las Cruces. Each spring semester, the station puts on a week-long festival known as KRUXfest which features local music acts.

== See also ==
- College radio
- List of college radio stations in the United States
