= KUHH-LP =

KUHH-LP, University Radio Hilo (URH)
- Hilo, Hawaii; United States
- Frequency: 101.1 MHz
- Branding: University Radio Hilo

Programming
- Format: Variety

Ownership
- Owner: University of Hawaii at Hilo
- Sister stations: KTUH

History
- First air date: 2015
- Call sign meaning: The UHH in KUHH Stands for University of Hawaii at Hilo

Technical information
- Licensing authority: FCC
- Facility ID: 194991
- Class: L1
- ERP: 100 watts
- HAAT: −169 meters (−554 ft)
- Transmitter coordinates: 19°42′12″N 155°05′1″W

Links
- Public license information: University Radio Hilo (URH) Public file; LMS
- Website: Official Website

KUHH-LP (101.1 FM) is a radio station licensed to serve the community of Hilo, Hawaii. The station is owned by the University of Hawaii at Hilo. It airs a variety radio format.

The station was assigned the KUHH-LP call letters by the Federal Communications Commission on February 26, 2014.

KUHH-LP (101.1 FM), also known at University of Hawaii at Hiloʻs campus community as University Radio Hilo (URH), provides the opportunity for UHH students to gain experience, education and training in radio broadcasting. URH also strives to improve the quality of life for the university community and general public through the broadcast of diverse, musical, cultural, educational and informative programming. All DJs and radio personalities who are live on-air are either current University of Hawaii at Hilo or Hawaiʻi Community College students, or University of Hawaii at Hilo alumni who were KUHH-LP (101.1 FM)staff or DJs as students.

== See also ==
- Campus radio
- List of college radio stations in the United States
