= WVAC-FM =

Coordinates: 41.8970°N 84.0611°W

- Adrian, Michigan; United States
- Broadcast area: Lenawee County, Michigan
- Frequency: 107.9 MHz

Programming
- Format: Contemporary Hit Radio

Ownership
- Owner: Adrian College

History
- Former call signs: WVAC (?–1991)
- Call sign meaning: Voice of Adrian College

Technical information
- Licensing authority: FCC
- Facility ID: 478
- Class: D
- ERP: 87 watts
- HAAT: 25.5 meters

Links
- Public license information: Public file; LMS
- Webcast: Listen Live
- Website: http://wvac.adrian.edu

WVAC-FM (107.9 MHz) is a campus radio station broadcasting a Top 40 and Alternative Rock format. The station is licensed to Adrian College, located on 110 S. Maddison Street.

The station has legally been WVAC-FM rather than simply WVAC since 1991. From then until 2002, the callsign WVAC were used by an AM station in Norwalk, Ohio (now WLKR). From 1968 until 1974 WVAC, the "Voice at Curry", was a carrier-current AM station at Curry College at Milton, Massachusetts, which later became WMLN-FM.

Former logo

== Sources ==
- Michiguide.com - WVAC-FM History

== See also ==
- Campus radio
- List of college radio stations in the United States
