= KBTL =

- El Dorado, Kansas; United States
- Frequency: 88.1 MHz
- Branding: 88.1 The Grizz

Programming
- Format: College Radio

Ownership
- Owner: Butler Community College (Butler County Community College)

History
- Call sign meaning: Butler (BTL)

Technical information
- Licensing authority: FCC
- Facility ID: 83259
- Class: A
- ERP: 400 watts
- HAAT: 28.0 meters
- Transmitter coordinates: 37°48′16.00″N 96°53′2.00″W

Links
- Public license information: Public file; LMS

KBTL (88.1 FM) is a radio station licensed to El Dorado, Kansas, United States. Owned by Butler County Community College, the station broadcasts a College Radio format. The initial license was granted in 2001, although unlicensed programming (microwatt AM) began as early as 1999. Programming included eclectic shows by students in the Radio-TV program broadcast live (10am-10pm M-F) with pre-programmed classic rock and light jazz music during off hours. In addition, all Butler Community College football, men's basketball and women's basketball games have been broadcast by students in the Sports Media program.

The early years were under the direction of Lance Hayes (director of King Kung Fu produced in Wichita) until his retirement in 2009. In August 2009, Dr. Keith West became faculty advisor and General Manager. A major overhaul of the station since 2009 has included new equipment from microphones to antenna, a locally programmed automation/assist system to increase the diversity of programming 24/7 and an increase in community affairs/news programming. In August 2010, the station was renamed from All-Amateur Radio to Butler Radio with the introduction of G-Bear, a Grizzly bear butler in a purple and gold tux (Butler Community College mascot is the Grizzly). 2014 saw the station become 88.1 The Grizz with a screaming grizzly bear head as logo. In 2018 with the assistance of Butler's Marketing Department, the station adopted the current logo. 2019 had brought a full-service web page (kbtl.butlercc.edu) and studio-quality remote capabilities. Current plans for Spring 2019 include increased community programming, more physical remotes in the community and stronger social media presence.

KBTL-FM and the Radio-TV program have won more awards from the Kansas Association of Broadcasters than any other 2-year colleges in Kansas, and have tied or won more awards than most Kansas 4-year institutions. In 2018, Butler became the first 2-year college in a number of years to be a College Broadcasters, Inc. production competition finalist (Seattle, WA). Zeb Campbell, formerly of Independence, received 4th place in the international competition. In association with other components of the Mass Communications program and performing arts division, participants have access to 4K video field/studio areas and analog/audacity audio recording studio.

== See also ==
- Campus radio
- List of college radio stations in the United States
