= WZIS-FM =

Radio station in Terre Haute, Indiana

- Terre Haute, Indiana; United States
- Frequency: 90.7 MHz
- Branding: Z90.7 FM, WZIS

Programming
- Format: Variety

Ownership
- Owner: Indiana State University; (Indiana State University Board of Trustees)

History
- First air date: 1981 (as WMHD-FM)
- Former call signs: WMHD-FM (1981–2014)

Technical information
- Licensing authority: FCC
- Facility ID: 57684
- Class: A
- ERP: 1,400 watts
- HAAT: 70 meters
- Transmitter coordinates: 39°30′14.00″N 87°26′37.00″W

Links
- Public license information: Public file; LMS
- Website: christianhitsz907.com

WZIS-FM (90.7 MHz, "Z90.7") is the student radio station at Indiana State University in Terre Haute, Indiana. The broadcast studio is located on-campus on the third floor of Dreiser Hall, while the antenna is located across the Wabash in West Terre Haute, Indiana.

The staff consists of many dedicated volunteer staff and paid directors, which include undergraduate and graduate students, as a faculty staff advisor.

WZIS-FM was previously WMHD, owned by Rose-Hulman. In 2013, WMHD ceased broadcasting over the air, but continues to stream programming today at https://wmhdradio.org. In 2014, Rose-Hulman sold the broadcast assets of WMHD to Indiana State University. The sale, at a price of $16,465, was consummated on August 15, 2014. Previously, on August 8, 2014, the station changed its call sign to its current name of WZIS-FM as part of the sale.

== Programming ==
WMHD Radio The Monkey is still on the air today at http://wmhdradio.org. In 2020, nearly 30 Rose-Hulman students have helped make WMHD as vibrant and active as any point in the past decade. The station broadcasts a variety of music and students can produce and put together their own shows. Categories such as alternative rock, pop, punk, bluegrass, and electronica all in a single broadcast day.

== See also ==
- Campus radio
- List of college radio stations in the United States
