= KAFA-FM =

- Colorado Springs, Colorado; United States
- Frequency: 97.7 MHz
- Branding: 97.7 The Academy

Programming
- Format: Rock, Alternative Rock

Ownership
- Owner: United States Air Force Academy

History
- First air date: January 17, 1971
- Former frequencies: 89.7 MHz; 104.5 MHz (1989–1993); 104.3 MHz (1993–2006)
- Call sign meaning: "Air Force Academy"

Technical information
- ERP: 125 watts
- HAAT: 30 feet
- Transmitter coordinates: 38°59′10″N 104°53′41″W

Links
- Webcast: KAFA listen live
- Website: KAFA-FM Online

KAFA-FM (97.7 FM, "97.7 The Academy") is a radio station operated by officer cadets at the United States Air Force Academy in Colorado Springs, Colorado.

The station does not hold a direct Federal Communications Commission license, as it is owned by a service academy. The United States government has a direct assignment of the call sign.

KAFA first broadcast in 1971 and has been on the air continuously since 1989. A full-time civilian station manager is employed in its operation and assists the cadet and permanent party DJs.

== History ==
The station first began broadcasting on the FM band on January 17, 1971; it was the first FM station compared to the carrier current AM stations at West Point or Annapolis. (The "KAFA" designation had once been used by a closed-circuit TV station at the academy.) Broadcasts were part-time and consisted of DJ-led programs, an annual charity marathon, and Academy football games, before those rights were sold commercially.

The station faded out some time after 1980, but it was revived on 104.5 MHz on February 13, 1989; it moved to 104.3 MHz in October 1993.

In 2004, KAFA was given a grant and updated its studio to current radio broadcasting industry standards with the introduction of Prophet Systems software and Dell computers. In June 2006, KAFA changed frequency to 97.7 MHz. The station subsequently solidified a format of Alternative rock and Indie rock branded as "The New 97.7". The programming also allows distinct DJs and personalities to maintain their own distinct shows. In 2008, the station began web streaming with support from the Association of Graduates. KAFA moved from Vandenberg Hall to Fairchild Hall in 2018.

== See also ==
- Campus radio
- List of college radio stations in the United States
