= KLJX-LP =

Coordinates: 35.1891°N 111.6558°W

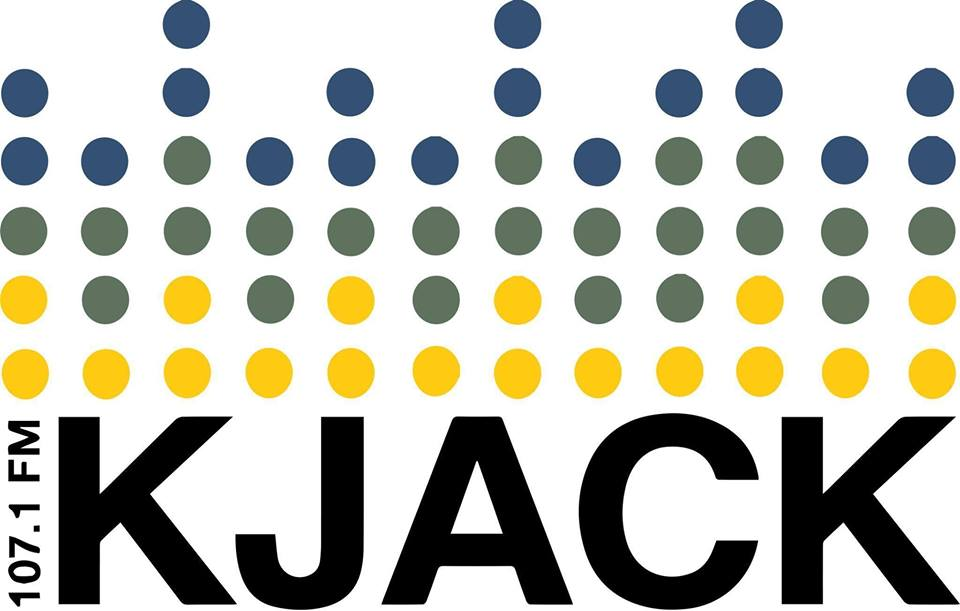
- Flagstaff, Arizona; United States
- Frequency: 107.1 FM
- Branding: KJACK Radio

Ownership
- Owner: Northern Arizona University

History
- First air date: 2015
- Call sign meaning: Lumberjacks

Technical information
- Licensing authority: FCC
- Facility ID: 193094
- Power: 100 watts

Links
- Public license information: LMS
- Webcast: http://soundtap.com/kjack
- Website: http://www.kjack.org

KLJX-LP ("KJACK", 107.1 FM) is a student-run college radio station serving the Northern Arizona University campus in Flagstaff, Arizona, United States. The station broadcasts a variety of music in a freeform format, as well as campus and high school sports coverage. The station operates out of the NAU School of Communication on the school's Flagstaff campus.

== About KJACK ==
KJACK is run by the students of Northern Arizona University, with students hosting shows in one-hour blocks featuring music, sports, pop culture, politics and news. In 2013, the station applied to the FCC for an FM broadcasting license. KJACK was granted an FM construction permit to broadcast on 107.1 FM with the call letters KLJX-LP, and was issued its license to cover on November 23, 2015. As of 2020, the station manager is Jimmy Moreau. The station hosts an annual arts festival in downtown Flagstaff and broadcasts NAU's D2 and D3 hockey games.

== See also ==
- Campus radio
- List of college radio stations in the United States
