= KACC =

Radio station at Alvin Community College in Alvin, Texas

- Alvin, Texas; United States
- Broadcast area: Greater Houston
- Frequency: 89.7 MHz
- Branding: The Gulf Coast Rocker

Programming
- Language: English
- Format: Album-oriented rock

Ownership
- Owner: Alvin Community College

History
- First air date: 1978
- Former frequencies: 91.3 MHz (1978–1992)
- Call sign meaning: Alvin Community College

Technical information
- Licensing authority: FCC
- Facility ID: 1205
- Class: A
- ERP: 5,600 watts
- HAAT: 101 meters (331 ft)
- Transmitter coordinates: 29°24′1″N 95°12′13″W

Links
- Public license information: Public file; LMS
- Webcast: Listen live
- Website: alvincollege.edu/communications/streams.html

KACC (89.7 FM) is an album-oriented rock (AOR) formatted radio station based in Alvin, Texas, United States, serving Greater Houston. It is under ownership of Alvin Community College. The station serves the Alvin and Brazoria County area, but also covers beyond those borders.

KACC was originally a volunteer radio station that became a part of the RTV curriculum at Alvin Community College. Founder Cathy Forsythe (1956–2007) was instrumental in making KACC a part of the Alvin/Brazoria County landscape, and was one of the original founders of the radio station.

The programming at KACC consists of current, classic, and local rock and roll. Occasionally the station will play other types of music to support local artists, and from time to time will air local high school sports. The current location of the KACC studios is across the street from Alvin Community College, but there are plans to move the radio station to a much smaller facility on the main campus.

== See also ==
- List of college radio stations in the United States
