= KGSP (FM) =

Radio station at Park University in Parkville, Missouri

- Parkville, Missouri; United States
- Broadcast area: Kansas City
- Frequency: 90.5 MHz
- Branding: Pirate Radio 90.5

Programming
- Format: Variety

Ownership
- Owner: Board of Trustees, Park University

History
- First air date: 1972
- Last air date: 2025
- Former frequencies: 90.3 MHz (1972–2009)

Technical information
- Licensing authority: FCC
- Facility ID: 6105
- Class: D
- ERP: 99 watts
- HAAT: 18 meters (59 ft)
- Transmitter coordinates: 39°11′24″N 94°40′49.9″W

Links
- Public license information: Public file; LMS
- Website: kgsp.park.edu

KGSP (90.5 FM, "Pirate Radio") was a part-time radio station broadcasting a variety music format. Licensed to Parkville, Missouri, United States, the station was owned by the Board of Trustees, Park University.

Logo while on the 90.3 frequency

KGSP started in 1972, at 90.3 at 10 watts. Its studios were in the co-ed dorm, New Hall back then, Chestnut today. Around 1976, the studios were moved to Copley Thaw Hall, still at 90.3 at 10 watts. The format when they were in the dorm was rock and roll, when it moved to Copley, they changed to a jazz format. The music was all on LP records and Park was a college then. Sometime after 1978, the college became a university, and the radio station was allowed a power increase to 99 watts, but still at 90.3. Sometime after this, an interference complaint from another radio station at 90.3 in Kansas came up. KGSP moved to 90.5 in 2009.

Park University surrendered the KGSP license in September 2025.

== See also ==
- Campus radio
- List of college radio stations in the United States
