= WZLY =

- Wellesley, Massachusetts; United States
- Broadcast area: Wellesley, Massachusetts
- Frequency: 91.5 MHz
- Branding: WZLY 91.5 FM

Programming
- Format: Free-format

Ownership
- Owner: Wellesley College

History
- First air date: 1976
- Call sign meaning: Wellesley

Technical information
- Licensing authority: FCC
- Facility ID: 71457
- Class: D
- ERP: 7 watts
- HAAT: 47 meters (154 ft)
- Transmitter coordinates: 42°17′35.3″N 71°18′19.2″W

Links
- Public license information: Public file; LMS
- Webcast: Listen live
- Website: wzly.org

WZLY (91.5 FM) is a non-commercial radio station broadcasting a college radio format. Licensed to Wellesley, Massachusetts, United States, the station is staffed by students of and is owned by Wellesley College. The student organization that hosts radio shows and maintains the broadcast is also known as WZLY.

The first radio station at Wellesley College was established on April 20, 1942, as WBS 730 AM. Early programming included radio plays, Porgy and Bess, a quiz show and the news. As an FM station, WZLY was first licensed on June 17, 1976. Today, the WZLY co-operative broadcasts on air at 91.5 FM and on an online radio stream. In addition to radio broadcasting, WZLY also DJs events on Wellesley's campus, hosts parties, and brings musical acts to campus. WZLY also maintains a student blog on their website, which features music reviews, interviews with artists, and music-related reflections.

== Transition to internet radio ==
In October 2014, WZLY announced that, pursuant to a vote taken during the previous year, the station's programming would move exclusively to Internet radio, with the 91.5 FM broadcast license being sold. The move was made in part because of the difficulty for a student-run radio station to comply with Federal Communications Commission (FCC) regulations.

However, in the spring of 2019, after years of trying to sell the license, the station voted to retain their broadcasting license. WZLY remains on air at 91.5 FM, and streams online as well.

== See also ==
- Campus radio
- List of college radio stations in the United States
