= KCFV =

Ferguson radio station

- Ferguson, Missouri; United States
- Frequency: 89.5 MHz
- Branding: 89.5 The Wave

Programming
- Format: College radio

Ownership
- Owner: St. Louis Community College

History
- First air date: April 17, 1972

Technical information
- Licensing authority: FCC
- Facility ID: 62138
- Class: A
- ERP: 100 watts
- HAAT: 49.0 meters
- Transmitter coordinates: 38°46′7″N 90°17′16″W

Links
- Public license information: Public file; LMS
- Webcast: Listen Live
- Website: www.stlcc.edu/kcfv

KCFV (89.5 FM) is a radio station licensed in Ferguson, Missouri, United States. The station is owned by St. Louis Community College.

== History ==
The station began operation on April 17, 1972, under license by the U.S. Federal Communications Commission (FCC) as a Class D low-power educational broadcasting service of Florissant Valley Community College (now St. Louis Community College at Florissant Valley). The initial transmitted power was regulated to 10 watts omnidirectional, leading to the campus nickname, "the weakest station in the nation". KCFV billed itself as "The 10-Watt Wonder". The station used the slogan, "Just Slightly Ahead of Our Time", a reference to the non-Top 40 progressive music that it featured.

As all radio stations have a 'meaning' to their letters, so does this one. The original 'call letters' were to reflect the school they are broadcast from: (KFVC), K (west of the Mississippi river), FVC (Florissant Valley College) BUT the FCC received the hand written application and mistook the V as a U, and decided to change the lettering to a less offensive order.

Since its beginning, KCFV has been operated by students of St. Louis Community College at Florissant Valley. Most of the on-air staff are majoring in Mass Communications.

Early broadcasts included a progressive rock music format, public affairs programs, news and sports. The station signed on daily at 3:00 pm with "The Towne Square", a progressive rock-themed, magazine-style program that followed a weekly rotation of music news, comedy, items of local interest, and politics. The balance of the broadcast day was filled by disc jockey programs of rock music. The station signed off at midnight.

Following changes in FCC rules governing low-power FM stations (LPFMs) in the early 1980s, the station was granted a Class A license to raise its transmitter power to 100 watts. KCFV is currently known as "The Wave", and programming features a wide variety of music formats. The station's slogan is "Diverse Music For Your Diverse Mind".

== See also ==
- Campus radio
- List of college radio stations in the United States
