= KRUA =

Radio station at the University of Alaska Anchorage

Coordinates: 61.336°N 149.516°W

Anchorage, Alaska; United States
- Frequency: 88.1 MHz
- Branding: 88.1 FM The Edge

Programming
- Format: College radio

Ownership
- Owner: University of Alaska

Technical information
- Licensing authority: FCC
- Facility ID: 69007
- Class: A
- ERP: 155 watts
- HAAT: 254 meters

Links
- Public license information: Public file; LMS
- Webcast: Listen Live direct URL
- Website: kruaradio.org

KRUA (88.1 FM) is a non-commercial educational college radio station in Anchorage, Alaska. The station is operated by students at the University of Alaska Anchorage (UAA) and is the only student-run station in Anchorage.

UAA students can tune in to KRUA each day to hear about new opportunities on their campus. From the main studios on UAA's campus to the transmitter in Eagle River, the radio station reaches a significant portion of Alaska's South Central region.

KRUA retains a large and diverse audience both locally by radio, and globally through online streaming which provides their Sponsors with broad-range exposure.

KRUA is maintained by a core group of student staff and by volunteers from the greater Anchorage and UAA community. Since 1992, KRUA has provided music and shows to their community while presenting students with a unique creative outlet, and the opportunity to gain skills in radio broadcasting.

== History ==
KRUA began transmitting in the spring of 1987. It was known then not as KRUA, but as KMPS. During this time, they borrowed a small transmitter from Augie Hiebert of Northern Television, Inc. The station worked on a small budget, receiving only $1.50 per student through a student fee.

KMPS was a carrier current station. The signal traveled through telephone lines and could only be heard in specifically targeted places. In this case, KMPS could only be heard in student housing and the campus center. The schedule was sporadic and depended on the school schedules of volunteer DJ's. The station tried to air from noon to 5 p.m., Monday through Friday, but occasionally missed an hour or two.

During the school year of 1989–90, actual proceedings began to create an FM station at UAA. After meetings with the University of Alaska Anchorage journalism and public communications department, local FCC offices, and the Anchorage Associated Broadcasters, Inc., documentation to create a non-commercial, educational station began.

In 1991, KMPS received the approval to move forward with the construction of a tower site for the young station, and 88.1-megahertz was assigned as its frequency. A referendum to increase student fees to $5.25 per student passed by a landslide: this allowed the station to move towards FM status.

On February 14, 1992, at approximately 5 p.m., KRUA's faint signal was suddenly being heard on the Hillside, in Turnagain and around the Anchorage area. REM's "It’s the End of the World as We Know It" was the first song Anchorage listeners heard from KRUA. In 2017, KRUA celebrated 25 years of FM broadcasts by hosting a free show with local acts I Like Robots, DJ Spencer Lee, and Lavoy.

As part of KRUA's licensing agreement and obligations, the station is available as an educational institution within the department of Journalism and Public Communications at UAA.

== Volunteers ==
KRUA is run by student staff and a body of volunteers who are students and citizens of Anchorage. The show schedule format varies widely, and KRUA has volunteer programs that cover a large range of genres. Such genres include everything from indie-rock and heavy metal to dance and electronic music.

=== Student Volunteers ===
Students who wish to be volunteers at KRUA must satisfy a number of requirements before being allowed to host an on-air program. Any student attempting to be involved must currently:

- Be enrolled at UAA with no less than 3 credits per semester.
- Be in good academic and disciplinary standing with UAA.
- Have a cumulative GPA of at least 2.0 or higher.

All current or returning volunteers must achieve these standards each semester.

Failure to meet these qualifications will result in a student volunteer being released from duties at the station. Student volunteers are required to fulfill a 3-hour-a-week obligation, and may not exceed more than 20 hours per week of volunteer work at the station. On-air volunteer conduct must adhere to all FCC/station policies. Trained student volunteers will be the first in line for open on-air positions.

=== Community Volunteers ===
All community volunteers are required to undergo the same on-air training as student volunteers, adhere to the same FCC/station policies and must pay an amount equal to the student media fee taken with UAA tuition. After completion of training, they will be offered on-air positions only after the opportunity has been made available to student volunteers.

=== Alumni Volunteers ===
Former employees and volunteers of KRUA who left in good standing can return as alumni at their previous level status after completing on-air training. Alumni volunteers are held to the same FCC standards as all others, but are exempt from paying the student media fee. Alumni will be offered on-air positions only after the opportunity has been made available to student volunteers.

=== Intern Volunteers ===
Intern volunteers, those individuals who have been sent to the station to fulfill academic or vocational requirements, are required to complete the same on-air training and follow the same FCC/station guidelines as any other within the station. All interns are required to work 6 hours a week.

== Funding ==
As KRUA is non-commercial, it is funded through student media fees and donations through underwriting.

== See also ==
- Campus radio
- List of college radio stations in the United States
