= WARC (FM) =

- Meadville, Pennsylvania; United States
- Broadcast area: Meadville, Pennsylvania
- Frequency: 90.3 MHz
- Branding: WARC Meadville 90.3

Programming
- Format: Variety

Ownership
- Owner: Allegheny College

History
- Founded: 1963
- First air date: February 3, 1963
- Call sign meaning: Allegheny Radio Commission

Technical information
- Licensing authority: FCC
- Facility ID: 1055
- Class: A
- ERP: 400 watts
- HAAT: 20.0 meters (65.6 ft)
- Transmitter coordinates: 41°38′57.00″N 80°8′38.00″W

Links
- Public license information: Public file; LMS
- Webcast: Listen live
- Website: www.warcmeadville.com

WARC (90.3 FM) is a student-run, non-commercial, Federal Communications Commission-registered college radio station owned and operated by Allegheny College in Meadville, Pennsylvania, United States.

The WARC studio is located on the main floor of the Henderson Campus Center, located on the campus of Allegheny College. On October 3, 2014, WARC began broadcasting streaming online.

== See also ==
- Campus radio
- List of college radio stations in the United States
