= KASF =

- Alamosa, Colorado; United States
- Broadcast area: Parts of the San Luis Valley
- Frequency: 90.9 MHz
- Branding: 90.9FM Grizz Radio

Programming
- Format: College radio

Ownership
- Owner: Adams State University

Technical information
- Licensing authority: FCC
- Facility ID: 451
- Class: A
- ERP: 1,100 watts
- HAAT: 27.0 meters
- Transmitter coordinates: 37°28′20″N 105°52′39″W

Links
- Public license information: Public file; LMS
- Website: blogs.adams.edu/kasf/

KASF (90.9 FM) is a college radio station licensed in Alamosa, Colorado, United States. The station, which serves part of the San Luis Valley, is owned by Adams State University.

== See also ==
- Campus radio
- List of college radio stations in the United States
