= WVGS =

Coordinates: 32.426°N 81.783°W

- Statesboro, Georgia; United States
- Frequency: 91.9 (MHz)
- Branding: 91.9 The Buzz

Programming
- Format: college / top 40

Ownership
- Owner: Georgia Southern University

History
- Call sign meaning: Voice of Georgia Southern

Technical information
- Licensing authority: FCC
- Class: A
- ERP: 1,000 watts
- HAAT: 49 meters

Links
- Public license information: Public file; LMS

WVGS FM 91.9 ("91-9 The Buzz") is a Statesboro, Georgia college radio station that plays a diverse range of music, including rock, rap and hip-hop. It is owned and operated by the students of Georgia Southern University, and is involved in public service in the community, including a book drive and a smoke-out for cancer in early 2010.

WVGS started out as an in-dorm carrier current station in Cone Hall in 1970. In 1974, the station moved to the Williams Student Center overlooking the campus quad and began broadcasting at 10 watts on their original assigned frequency 107.7 FM, known as "The Voice of Georgia Southern." The first song played on the air was Statesboro Blues by The Allman Brothers. The format was changed from contemporary rock to alternative/college music in the early 1980s. In 1985, the station changed to the current frequency and upped their broadcast power to 1000 watts. In 2014, WVGS moved to a state of the art studio in Sanford Hall, a former dorm converted to housing the Department of Communication Arts.

== See also ==
- Campus radio
- List of college radio stations in the United States
