= KDIC (radio station) =

Radio station in Grinnell, Iowa, 1968–2024

- Grinnell, Iowa; United States
- Frequency: 88.5 MHz

Ownership
- Owner: Grinnell College

History
- First air date: May 20, 1968 (as KDIC)
- Last air date: July 15, 2022 (on FM)

Technical information
- Licensing authority: FCC
- Facility ID: 25391
- Class: A
- ERP: 130 watts
- HAAT: 38 meters (125 ft)
- Transmitter coordinates: 41°44′56″N 92°43′10″W

Links
- Public license information: Public file; LMS
- Webcast: https://kdic.mixlr.com/
- Website: https://kdic.grinnell.edu

KDIC was an online-only radio station owned by Grinnell College and operated by its students. From 1969 until 2020, the station was a non-commercial radio station licensed to Grinnell, Iowa, broadcasting at 88.5 MHz.

== History ==
On December 6, 1948, KGRW began broadcasting as Grinnell College's first radio station. It broadcast popular and classical music, news, and interviews. In 1961, students appealed for funding to upgrade the station equipment, but the request was turned down, and the station closed until spring 1968, when it was reopened as KDIC.

KDIC went on the air on May 20, 1968, on 88.9 MHz using a 10-watt FM transmitter located on the second floor of Darby Gym. During the first year, 85 students provided enough staffing to allow for 121 hours a week of programming.

In 1971, after experiencing increasing interference on 88.9 MHz, the Federal Communications Commission (FCC) approved the frequency change to 88.5 MHz. In 1984, transmitter power was increased to 130 watts.

The licensee failed to file for license renewal by October 1, 2004, and the station's license expired on February 1, 2005. The FCC approved special temporary authority (STA) on October 18, 2005, and the station resumed operation, ceasing for the second time on May 12, 2006, in anticipation of the end of the academic year. The FCC granted a second STA on September 22, 2006, and on January 31, 2007, approved the renewal of the KDIC license.

The FCC cancelled KDIC's license for the second time on July 15, 2022, as the station had been silent since August 31, 2020. The college petitioned the FCC for reinstatement of the license, which occurred on October 27, 2022.

On December 21, 2023, Grinnell College surrendered KDIC's license to the FCC, who cancelled it for the third time on January 8, 2024.

Starting in April 2024, KDIC began broadcasting as an online-only station.

=== Railroad track antenna legend ===
According to campus legend, between the 1950s and 1970s, KGRW committed an FCC violation and was removed from the air for a year after station DJs illegally connected the radio transmitter to metal train tracks on campus, supposedly creating a transmission radius that was hundreds or possibly thousands of miles. According to FCC records, no such violation has ever been documented.

== See also ==
- Campus radio
- List of college radio stations in the United States
