= KOHL =

Radio station in Fremont, California

- Fremont, California; United States
- Broadcast area: East Bay
- Frequency: 89.3 MHz
- Branding: 89.3 KOHL

Programming
- Language: English
- Format: Contemporary hit radio

Ownership
- Owner: Ohlone Community College District

History
- First air date: 1972
- Call sign meaning: Ohlone College

Technical information
- Licensing authority: FCC
- Facility ID: 22626
- Class: A
- ERP: 145 watts (horiz.); 115 watts (vert.)
- HAAT: 124 meters (407 ft)
- Transmitter coordinates: 37°32′14″N 121°54′14″W

Links
- Public license information: Public file; LMS
- Webcast: Listen live
- Website: kohlradio.com

KOHL (89.3 FM) is a student-run college radio station licensed to and owned by Ohlone Community College District in Fremont, California, United States. The station broadcasts a Contemporary hit radio format.

KOHL is the primary instructional facility for the Ohlone College Radio Broadcast program.

KOHL production studio

== History ==
=== 1972 to 1984 ===
89.3 KOHL signed on in 1972, as a 10 watt FM station. A residential house located on the Ohlone College Fremont campus served as home to both the studios and transmitter. The KOHL logo reflected this. The logo consisted of KOHL in bold lettering at the top, a house in the middle, and "Ohlone College" written at the bottom. Adjacent to the back of the house was an antenna. This is very similar to how things really were at the facility. The transmitter sat in the fireplace of the house. A line of coaxial cable took the signal from the transmitter up through the chimney and then over to the tower.

In 1981, KOHL adopted a CHR format, shedding its previous free-form typical college radio sound.

=== 1984 to 1992 ===
In 1984, KOHL was granted an increase in power by the FCC moving the station up to 100 watts ERP. The transmitter remained in building 29, while the studios were moved into building 4 on the Ohlone College campus. In 1992, KOHL was once again granted an increase in power, bringing the station to 145 watts ERP. The transmitter was moved from building 29 to Mission Ridge. The move in power and location gave KOHL a much farther-reaching signal that could be heard from as far north as Oakland to San Jose in the south bay. This configuration remains today.

=== 1992 to the present ===
In October 1995, the Gary Soren Smith Center for the Fine and Performing Arts was officially opened at the Ohlone College Fremont Campus. The Smith Center consists of two theater venues, a dance studio, an amphitheater, and a broadcasting complex. The second floor of the broadcasting complex was specifically designed for KOHL (the first floor houses Ohlone College's TV station, ONTV). The facility consists of four studios, support offices, an engineering center and a classroom. In addition to moving into brand new custom studios, KOHL also made the move to the RCS Master Control digital radio platform, which ultimately became an industry standard. KOHL was one of the earliest west coast broadcast facilities to make the transition and was often used by the RCS company as a showcase for the product. In 2005, KOHL converted from the DOS based RCS Master Control system to the Windows XP version.

== Branding ==
In 1999, the branding and imaging of KOHL received an overhaul to better adapt the station for the modern radio industry, the old slogan of "The Best Music!" was retired and replaced with "Music. Attitude"., the imaging between songs took on a more aggressive sound. Often using agro rock or industrial music underneath the station voice became heavily processed and more drops from television and movies were worked into the production, the logo was changed as well moving from a two-color handwriting type font to a larger bolder faced offset stacked. The three color of red, white, and black logo with "89.3" on the top and "KOHL" on the bottom.

== KOHL as an educational broadcasting program ==
KOHL as a whole is the primary working lab of the Radio Broadcasting Program at Ohlone College in Fremont, California, providing real-world, hands-on experience to students. The program is a career-oriented, operations-intensive curriculum featuring the latest technology. Lecture and lab situations (both on air and off) combine to provide students with the background and skills required to meet the needs of the radio communications industry. The program features both analog and digital studio systems, including digital multitrack production techniques. The curriculum is presented by industry professionals and is designed to focus on the business of radio broadcasting. The station's format is high energy contemporary hit radio which challenges students to refine commercial broadcast techniques in a professional environment.

Courses can be found under "Broadcasting (BRDC)" in the Ohlone College Catalog and Class Schedule. Ohlone offers an Associate in Arts degree in Broadcasting. Also available are Fast Track Certificates in Radio Broadcasting Studio Operations, Air Talent, Program Management, and Digital Production.

== Promotions ==
Every year KOHL broadcasts from the Fremont Festival of the Arts on both days of the festival. "KOHL's Ultimate Prom" gives listeners everything they need for prom and usually includes a dress, hair and makeup, tux rental, dinner, and flowers. KOHL airs a weekly countdown show Saturday nights called the KOHL Top 10 @ 10. Listeners can win prizes by reciting the entire Top 10 list after it has been revealed on air. The station often gives away concert tickets and DVDs.

=== Past promotions ===
Simpsons Season 9 Slots: Listeners had to identify three Simpsons characters to win a Simpsons Season 9 box set.

Simon Said: Listeners had to guess what Simon Cowell had said about American Idol finalists to win tickets to the American Idol live tour.

Chick or Treat: Listeners either won tickets to see a female performer (the chick) or food at local restaurants (the treat). The concert tickets were for Kelly Clarkson and Gwen Stefani.

The Singing Bee-Yonce: Listeners had to complete Beyoncé lyrics to win tickets to see Beyoncé.

Matchbox 20 Matchups: Listeners had to predict the winner of a matchup to win tickets to see Matchbox Twenty. Matchups included "a shark with lasers vs. a monkey driving a pickup truck", "Arnold Schwarzenegger vs. a puppy", and "Chuck Norris vs Godzilla with a chainsaw".

== See also ==
- Campus radio
- List of college radio stations in the United States
