= KBWC =

Radio station at Wiley College in Marshall, Texas

- Marshall, Texas; United States
- Broadcast area: Longview-Marshall area
- Frequency: 91.1 MHz

Programming
- Format: Urban contemporary

Ownership
- Owner: Wiley College

History
- First air date: 1977
- Call sign meaning: Keep Building Wiley College

Technical information
- Licensing authority: FCC
- Facility ID: 72449
- Class: A
- ERP: 135 watts
- HAAT: 34.0 meters (111.5 ft)
- Transmitter coordinates: 32°32′12″N 94°22′29″W

Links
- Public license information: Public file; LMS
- Webcast: Listen live
- Website: wileyc.edu/kbwc-radio-91-1-the-mix

KBWC (91.1 FM) is a radio station broadcasting an urban contemporary format. Licensed to Marshall, Texas, United States, the station serves the Longview-Marshall area. The station is currently owned by Wiley College.

== See also ==
- Campus radio
- List of college radio stations in the United States
