= KXRJ =

Radio station at Arkansas Tech University

- Russellville, Arkansas; United States
- Broadcast area: Arkansas Tech University campus
- Frequency: 91.9 MHz

Programming
- Format: College Radio

Ownership
- Owner: Arkansas Tech University

Technical information
- Licensing authority: FCC
- Facility ID: 2786
- Class: A
- ERP: 100 watts
- HAAT: -28.0 meters
- Transmitter coordinates: 35°17′47″N 93°8′18″W

Links
- Public license information: Public file; LMS
- Website: https://www.atu.edu/humanities/cj/broadcast/radio.php

KXRJ (91.9 FM) is a radio station licensed to Russellville, Arkansas, United States, the station serves the Arkansas college area. The station is currently owned by Arkansas Tech University.

== See also ==
- Campus radio
- List of college radio stations in the United States
