= KWDC-LP =

- Stockton, California; United States
- Broadcast area: Metro Stockton
- Frequency: 93.5 MHz
- Branding: KWDC 93.5

Programming
- Format: Variety

Ownership
- Owner: San Joaquin Delta College; (San Joaquin Delta Community College District)

History
- First air date: January 1, 2015
- Call sign meaning: Delta College

Technical information
- Licensing authority: FCC
- Facility ID: 193193
- ERP: 100 watts
- HAAT: 29.7 meters (97 ft)
- Transmitter coordinates: 37°59′45.70″N 121°19′6.80″W

Links
- Public license information: LMS
- Webcast: Listen live
- Website: www.kwdc.fm

KWDC-LP is a Variety formatted broadcast radio station. The station is licensed to and serving Stockton in California. KWDC-LP is owned by San Joaquin Delta College and operated under their San Joaquin Delta Community College District licensee.

== History ==
The station officially launched on at just before "the stroke of Noon" on January 1, 2015, but didn't officially get its License to Cover until April 6, 2015.

On May 27, 2016, the station briefly signed off, though it did not file an application for special temporary authority with the Federal Communications Commission, after its founding instructor William Story retired. The student staff of KWDC-LP were to move to the Peace and Justice Network of San Joaquin Country-owned KXVS-LP to get their station on the air. Unfortunately, the station's website URL and slogan "The Voice of Stockton" were trademarked by the station's former general manager, who also redirected all of KWDC-LP's social media accounts to KXVS'. Eventually, KWDC-LP returned to the air on September 18, 2016. Subsequently, KXVS-LP went silent in late-September 2017 and its license was lost in late-September 2018.

== See also ==
- Campus radio
- List of college radio stations in the United States
