= KALU =

Radio station at Langston University in Langston, Oklahoma

- Langston, Oklahoma; United States
- Broadcast area: Oklahoma City area, Guthrie, Oklahoma
- Frequency: 89.3 MHz
- Branding: KALU 89.3

Programming
- Format: Urban Contemporary/College Radio

Ownership
- Owner: Langston University

History
- First air date: March 3, 1975
- Call sign meaning: K A Langston University

Technical information
- Licensing authority: FCC
- Facility ID: 36529
- Class: A
- ERP: 150 watts
- HAAT: 61 meters (200 ft)
- Transmitter coordinates: 35°56′36″N 97°15′32″W

Links
- Public license information: Public file; LMS

KALU (89.3 FM) is an American non-commercial educational radio station broadcasting an urban contemporary/College Radio format with some talk radio programming, licensed to Langston, Oklahoma. Established in 1975, the station is owned by Langston University. KALU is operated by the University's Department of Broadcast Journalism and School of Arts and Sciences.

== See also ==
- Campus radio
- List of college radio stations in the United States
