= WMTB-FM =

- Emmitsburg, Maryland; United States
- Frequency: 89.9 MHz

Programming
- Format: College/Religious

Ownership
- Owner: Mount St. Mary's University

History
- First air date: 1969

Technical information
- Licensing authority: FCC
- Facility ID: 43919
- Class: A
- ERP: 100 watts
- HAAT: 44.0 meters
- Transmitter coordinates: 39°41′2.00″N 77°21′25.00″W

Links
- Public license information: Public file; LMS
- Webcast: Listen Live
- Website: WMTB-FM Online

WMTB-FM (89.9 FM) is the student radio station of Mount Saint Mary's. Licensed to Emmitsburg, Maryland, United States, the station offers mainly student-and-faculty produced programming. The station also offers a Classic Rock automation format when programming is not live.

== See also ==
- Campus radio
- List of college radio stations in the United States
