= WGRE =

- Greencastle, Indiana; United States
- Frequency: 91.5 MHz
- Branding: WGRE 91.5

Programming
- Format: College

Ownership
- Owner: DePauw University

History
- First air date: April 28, 1949

Technical information
- Licensing authority: FCC
- Facility ID: 16697
- Class: A
- ERP: 800 watts
- HAAT: 54 meters (177 ft)
- Transmitter coordinates: 39°38′19″N 86°51′49″W

Links
- Public license information: Public file; LMS
- Website: wgre.org

WGRE (91.5 FM) is a non-commercial educational radio station licensed to serve Greencastle, Indiana, United States. The station, established in 1949, is owned by DePauw University. WGRE broadcasts a college radio format. The station consistently ranks as one of the top college radio stations in the country.

== See also ==
- Campus radio
- List of college radio stations in the United States
