= KWPU =

- Oskaloosa, Iowa; United States
- Frequency: 90.5 (MHz)
- Branding: The Ladder

Programming
- Format: Variety

Ownership
- Owner: William Penn University

History
- Former call signs: KIGC (1976–2019)
- Former frequencies: 88.7 MHz (1976–2017) 88.5 (2017–2018)
- Call sign meaning: William Penn University

Technical information
- Licensing authority: FCC
- Facility ID: 72710
- Class: A
- ERP: 1000 watts
- HAAT: 35 m (115 ft)
- Transmitter coordinates: 41°18′37″N 92°38′49″W

Links
- Public license information: Public file; LMS

KWPU (90.5 FM) is a non-commercial radio station that serves the William Penn University campus and the Oskaloosa, Iowa area. The station broadcasts a variety format. KWPU is owned by William Penn University.

The station told the FCC in a notification of suspension of operations that it went silent on March 5, 2018, when its tower was blown over in a wind storm.

The transmitter and broadcast antenna are located on the campus of William Penn College. According to the FCC database, the antenna is mounted 27 m (89 ft) above ground level. The calculated Height Above Average Terrain is 35 m (115 ft).

== See also ==
- Campus radio
- List of college radio stations in the United States
