= WFSE =

- Edinboro, Pennsylvania; United States
- Frequency: 88.9 MHz
- Branding: 88.9 FM WFSE

Programming
- Format: Alternative
- Affiliations: AP Radio

Ownership
- Owner: PennWest Edinboro; (Edinboro University of Pennsylvania)

History
- First air date: April 3, 1979
- Former frequencies: 88.7 MHz
- Call sign meaning: Fighting Scots of Edinboro

Technical information
- Licensing authority: FCC
- Facility ID: 18665
- Class: A
- ERP: 3,000 watts
- HAAT: 91.0 meters (298.6 ft)
- Transmitter coordinates: 41°52′41.00″N 80°10′40.00″W

Links
- Public license information: Public file; LMS
- Website: www.edinboro.edu/directory/offices-services/communications-marketing/services/student-media.html

WFSE (88.9 FM), known as Fighting Scots Radio, is a college radio station at PennWest Edinboro in Edinboro, Pennsylvania. The station broadcasts from Compton Hall on the university campus and transmits from a facility located just off the on-ramp for I-79 South in Edinboro.

It features a broad rock format which includes alternative and indie artists, along with specialty shows highlighting live sports, sports talk, news, and other musical genres. The station is student-led, assisted by a faculty advisor.

== History ==
WFSE has served the campus and community since 1978 and streams 24/7 worldwide at edinboronow.com, the online hub for all of the university's campus media. Staffing is open to all majors, with positions available both on and off the air. In addition, there are a limited number of practicum opportunities for students in management roles.

Dr. Gary Christiansen was instrumental in its initial formation and provided guidance for over a decade. Numerous past and recent staff members have graduated to successful careers both within and outside of the media. The first student General Manager, John Evans, later represented the 5th district as a member of the Pennsylvania House of Representatives from 2001–2013. Sean Peebles, a 1996 alumnus, is another former student General Manager, and is currently the public address announcer of the Cleveland Cavaliers.

=== Transmitter ===
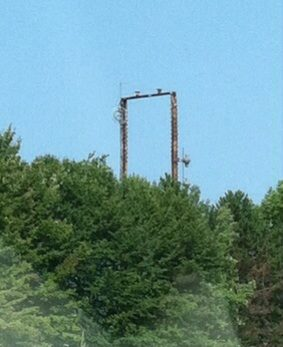
The WFSE transmitter, attached to a sign frame

One item of note is the station's transmitter facility. Unlike most stations that broadcast from a self-supporting or guyed tower specially designed for broadcast use, WFSE's signal radiates from a repurposed sign frame at a former truck stop at the intersection of US 6N and the I-79 southbound on-ramp. The tri-bay transmitting antenna is affixed to one side of the frame, while the studio-transmitter link receiver is on the other.

== See also ==
- List of college radio stations in the United States
