= WCUC-FM =

91.7 WCUC-FM
- Clarion, Pennsylvania; United States
- Frequency: 91.7 MHz
- Branding: The Clutch

Programming
- Format: Alternative, free format, adult contemporary
- Affiliations: Saturday Light Brigade Network, Red Zone Media

Ownership
- Owner: Pennsylvania Western University, Clarion

Technical information
- Licensing authority: FCC
- Facility ID: 11663
- Class: A
- ERP: 3,800 watts
- HAAT: 97.0 meters
- Transmitter coordinates: 41°12′35.00″N 79°22′39.00″W

Links
- Public license information: WCUC-FM Public file; LMS
- Website: www.wcuc.org

91.7 WCUC FM is an American fully operational, FCC-licensed, non-commercial educational, student-run radio station under the Department of Communication that is operated with the intention of being a student learning lab for PennWest Clarion.

WCUC-FM is dedicated to connecting Clarion County and the surrounding areas through unique, high-quality music, performance and public affairs programming that informs, educates, entertains, and inspires listeners.

WCUC-FM is located at G55 Becker Hall, 840 Wood St., Clarion, Pennsylvania.

WCUC-FM has nine functional departments: Programming, Sports, News, Events, Promotions, Staff Development, Music, Production and Underwriting, and a station and assistant station manager.

== History ==
WCUC was founded in September 1977 as Clarion University's FM radio station. The newly formed station guaranteed a variety of entertainment and something for everyone. WCUC received its FCC licensing earlier in the year on April 26, 1977.

From 1977 through the decades until today, WCUC's mission had been to serve the community and the college with an alternative sound in radio and bring them the best in news, sports and music.

WCUC's first broadcast was on September 12, 1977, with a 1000-watt station giving it an audience radius of 40 miles. WCUC, at that time broadcast from 3 pm to 12 midnight, giving the Clarion area its very first late-night FM station.

WCUC celebrated its 30th anniversary in April 2007 during Clarion University's media day down across from the Court House at Spring Fling.

== On-air staff and broadcasting ==
DJs are trained under the rules and regulations of 91.7 WCUC-FM and regulations and laws of the FCC. WCUC-FM is a free format radio station; allowing DJs to be granted complete control over their playlists. For a full list of on-air DJ staff, visit the WCUC-FM website for times and genes.

91.7 WCUC-FM broadcasts with a 3200-watt station, which has the capabilities of broadcasting 60 miles in any direction.

In August 2005 WCUC acquired an automation system manufactured by Scotts Studios Inc. now known as Wide Orbit Radio Automation Inc. The Scotts System allowed WCUC to go from broadcasting from 6 am to midnight to 24 hours. The Scotts system allows WCUC to have a computer to schedule songs, according to pre set schedules when DJs are not present.

WCUC has a state of the art hybrid transmitter, making WCUC capable of broadcasting in IBOC, digital and analog when desired (WCUC is currently only broadcasting in analog).

91.7 WCUC-FM is an authorized Emergency Broadcast System station, connected to issuing agencies via satellite, internet, and radio monitoring allowing WCUC to broadcast emergency alerts, emergency notifications, and Amber Alerts.

== See also ==
- List of college radio stations in the United States

== Sources ==
- "WCUC-FM Facility Record". United States Federal Communications Commission, audio division.
