= KSMC =

Radio station at Saint Mary's College of California

- Moraga, California; United States
- Frequency: 89.5 MHz

Ownership
- Owner: Associated Students of St. Mary's College

History
- First air date: 1975
- Last air date: 2025
- Call sign meaning: St. Mary's College

Technical information
- Facility ID: 3024
- Class: A
- ERP: 800 watts
- HAAT: 24 meters (79 ft)
- Transmitter coordinates: 37°50′24.7″N 122°6′39.8″W

KSMC (89.5 FM) was a radio station licensed to Moraga, California, United States, broadcasting from the campus of Saint Mary's College of California.

KSMC broadcast at 89.5 on the FM dial with an effective radiated power of 800 watts and was streaming online since 2012.

Since the station's inception in 1975, it was entirely student-run.

Student DJs had the opportunity to play music at school events such as barbecues, club meetings, or community building events.

== History ==
KSMC went on the air in 1975. It shut down in 1978 when it lost its home in a condemned dorm when it was remodeled, but reopened in 1979 with new equipment in the Student Union Building with a grant from Transamerica Corporation.

In 2012, KSMC began streaming online via TuneIn. It was later available on a variety of streaming services.

The Federal Communications Commission cancelled the station’s license on May 22, 2025.

== See also ==
- Campus radio
- List of college radio stations in the United States
