= WXAV =

Radio station at St. Xavier University in Chicago

WXAV 88.3FM
- Chicago, Illinois; United States
- Frequency: 88.3 MHz
- Branding: The X 88.3FM

Programming
- Format: Adult album alternative

Ownership
- Owner: Saint Xavier University

History
- First air date: 1977

Technical information
- Licensing authority: FCC
- Facility ID: 62179
- Class: A
- ERP: 150 watts
- HAAT: 39 meters (128 ft)
- Transmitter coordinates: 41°42′37″N 87°42′54″W

Links
- Public license information: 88.3FM Public file; LMS
- Webcast: Listen Live
- Website: www.wxav.com

WXAV (88.3 FM) is the college radio station of Saint Xavier University in Chicago. WXAV serves the south and southwest side of Chicago, Illinois and its surrounding suburbs. WXAV has its studios located inside the radio station building. The building is nearby the Mercy Meeting Place.

== History ==
WXAV was started in 1977 by Saint Xavier student Chuck Floramo. Originally a wired radio station that could only be heard in Saint Xavier's cafeteria, WSXC as it was known, went on the air playing the hits of the day. In the early 1990s, WSXC became a licensed radio station with the FCC and changed its call letters to WXAV and would broadcast for 12 day.

In August 2002 WXAV began to broadcast 24 hours a day, 7 days a week, when WBBM's Kris Kridel relaunched the radio station in an official ceremony.

In September 2010 Paste Magazine ran a poll and article discussing the 40 best low wattage radio stations in the country. WXAV was named to the list in the category of best stations that broadcast at 150 watts.

== Format ==
The station's music format is officially registered as "alternative," but this title does not resemble the commercial radio format of the same name. The station's music is hand-picked by DJs on air and also takes in listener requests. The music tends to be rock music from the 1960s on, including metal, punk, indie, and industrial, with specialty programs throughout the week that feature Jazz and Classical music. WXAV has been playing local and unsigned bands since its inception.

== Public affairs programming ==
God Matters which is produced in conjunction with the Sisters of Mercy, who founded Saint Xavier University.

== Sports ==
WXAV airs Saint Xavier University athletics including Cougar Football and Basketball. For a complete schedule of Saint Xavier University sporting events go to WXAV's official sports page

Beginning in 2009, WXAV became the official radio home of The Windy City ThunderBolts of the Frontier League announced in an official press. In 2009 and again in 2010, WXAV broadcast 55 out of 96 regular season games, and in 2010 broadcast all of the Windy City ThunderBolts' playoff games. The play by play announcer for the 2010 season was WXAV alumni and former Sports Director Terry Bonadonna

== See also ==
- Campus radio
- List of college radio stations in the United States
