= KFSR =

- Fresno, California; United States
- Frequency: 90.7 MHz
- Branding: 90.7 KFSR

Programming
- Language: English
- Format: Variety

Ownership
- Owner: California State University, Fresno

History
- First air date: October 1982
- Call sign meaning: "Fresno State Radio" or "Full Spectrum Radio"

Technical information
- Licensing authority: FCC
- Facility ID: 8349
- Class: A
- ERP: 2,550 watts
- HAAT: 20 meters (66 ft)
- Transmitter coordinates: 36°48′42″N 119°44′43″W

Links
- Public license information: Public file; LMS
- Webcast: Listen live
- Website: kfsr.fresnostate.edu

KFSR (90.7 FM) is a student-run college radio station licensed to Fresno, California, United States, and owned by California State University, Fresno. KFSR broadcasts a variety format, including jazz, blues and other music genres.

== History ==
Radio station KFSR was founded in 1982 at California State University, Fresno. The primary format at that time was jazz in the morning and mostly new wave music from noon until 2:00am. Weekend programming was varied, including country/western, soul/rap, and public affairs programming. The station also aired many FSU sporting events. A typical broadcast week could include as many as 30 volunteer student announcers/DJs, mostly from the university's Radio-Television Department. A single-page promotional newsletter, The Dead Air Diary, was printed from 1983–85 and distributed at local record stores.

For its ten-year anniversary in 1992, the station compiled and produced A Decade of Homicide, Raisins and Heat, a collection of songs by local Fresno rock bands. The album included an assorted mix of musical styles including alternative rock, funk, ska, Thrash metal, and rock, but not country. In 1994, the university's campus station aired coverage of Fresno State volleyball, basketball, and softball home games.

In 2002, the station director was Matthew Boam who went by the nickname "The Bucket". The station celebrated its twentieth anniversary by holding a reunion for former KFSR members. Focusing on its role is to promote local music, the station put together a two-day concert to celebrate KFSR and celebrate local musicians. The station also produced a 21-track CD of local music to coincide with the bands appearing at the concert.

The station began holding membership drives in 2003, as well as a community affairs program about air quality.

In 2005, local musicians came together to hold a three-day concert to raise funds for KFSR. In December 2006, the station began to air the syndicated A Prairie Home Companion, hosted by Garrison Keillor.

== See also ==
- Campus radio
- List of college radio stations in the United States
