= WCHC =

Coordinates: 42.238°N 71.808°W

- Worcester, Massachusetts; United States
- Broadcast area: Worcester, Massachusetts
- Frequency: 88.1 MHz
- Branding: WCHC

Programming
- Format: College radio

Ownership
- Owner: College of the Holy Cross

History
- First air date: December 6, 1948
- Call sign meaning: College of the Holy Cross

Technical information
- Licensing authority: FCC
- Facility ID: 65560
- Class: A
- ERP: 100 watts
- HAAT: −2 meters (−6.6 ft)

Links
- Public license information: Public file; LMS
- Webcast: Listen live
- Website: www.holycross.edu/wchc-88-1-fm

WCHC (88.1 FM) is the student-run radio station of College of the Holy Cross in Worcester, Massachusetts, its city of license, and broadcasts at a frequency of 88.1 MHz. It has been broadcasting as the only alternative source in Worcester, MA since December 6, 1948.

The station is operated by mainly student DJs who play a wide variety of music, from rock to classical and modern, including talk shows about sports, politics, and modern events.

== Sports ==
All home games and a handful of away games of Holy Cross' Crusader sporting events, namely football, basketball, and ice hockey, are broadcast live on WCHC.

== History ==
WCHC began operation on December 6, 1948, as a closed-circuit station, limited to the Holy Cross campus, available at 640 AM. The college started the station as a student activity under the guidance of (Rev.) John Kelly, S.J., who often broadcast from the studios himself as "Father Pseudo".

By the 1970s WCHC had begun broadcasting as a 10-watt FM station at the frequency 89.1.

In 1988, after many years awaiting approval from the FCC, the station was granted approval to increase its output from 10 watts to 100 watts allowing it to reach most of the city of Worcester, but in order to accommodate the increased power, the station had to move to the 88.1 frequency to avoid interference with other stations in New England, particularly, the 4,000-watt WERS (Emerson College) at 88.9 in Boston.

== See also ==
- Campus radio
- List of college radio stations in the United States
