= WESN =

- Bloomington, Illinois; United States
- Broadcast area: Bloomington
- Frequency: 88.1 MHz
- Branding: Radio to the Far Left

Programming
- Format: Alternative music

Ownership
- Owner: Illinois Wesleyan University

Technical information
- Licensing authority: FCC
- Facility ID: 28319
- Class: A
- ERP: 120 watts
- HAAT: 30 meters (98 ft)
- Transmitter coordinates: 40°29′28.00″N 88°59′37.00″W

Links
- Public license information: Public file; LMS
- Website: iwu.edu/wesn/

WESN (88.1 FM) is a radio station broadcasting an Alternative format. Owned by Illinois Wesleyan University, the station serves Bloomington-Normal, Illinois. WESN's main studio is located in the basement of Illinois Wesleyan's Kemp Hall. Most WESN programs are staffed by students, but the station is open to willing community volunteers.

== See also ==
- Campus radio
- List of college radio stations in the United States
