= KBSB =

Radio station at Bemidji State University in Bemidji, Minnesota

- Bemidji, Minnesota; United States
- Frequency: 89.7 MHz
- Branding: FM 90

Programming
- Format: College radio

Ownership
- Owner: Bemidji State University

History
- First air date: 1970

Technical information
- Licensing authority: FCC
- Facility ID: 4654
- Class: A
- ERP: 120 watts
- HAAT: 38.0 meters
- Transmitter coordinates: 47°29′0″N 94°52′27″W

Links
- Public license information: Public file; LMS
- Website: fm90.org

KBSB (89.7 FM, "FM 90") is a radio station licensed to Bemidji, Minnesota, United States, airing a College radio format. The station is owned by Bemidji State University.

== See also ==
- Campus radio
- List of college radio stations in the United States
