= WKNJ-FM =

- Union Township, New Jersey; United States
- Frequency: 90.3 MHz

Programming
- Format: Variety

Ownership
- Owner: Kean University

History
- Call sign meaning: Kean New Jersey

Technical information
- Licensing authority: FCC
- Facility ID: 33783
- Class: D
- ERP: 9 watts
- HAAT: 5.0 meters
- Transmitter coordinates: 40°40′35.00″N 74°14′2.00″W

Links
- Public license information: Public file; LMS
- Website: wknj903.com

WKNJ-FM (90.3 FM) is a college radio station at Kean University and is completely managed and operated by Kean students. WKNJ's studios are located on the 4th floor of the Center For Academic Success building, room 401.

== General ==
WKNJ's transmitter is located on the Union campus of Kean University. WKNJs FM license is held by the Board of Trustees of Kean University. WKNJ broadcasts on 90.3 megahertz on weekdays 24 hours a day, and on the internet 24 hours a day, 7 days a week.

== See also ==
- College radio
- List of college radio stations in the United States
