= KAXM =

- Nacogdoches, Texas; United States
- Frequency: 90.1 MHz

Programming
- Format: college radio
- Affiliations: ABC Radio

Ownership
- Owner: Stephen F. Austin State University

History
- Former call signs: KSAU (1974–2024)

Technical information
- Licensing authority: FCC
- Facility ID: 63249
- Class: C3
- ERP: 3,500 watts
- HAAT: 137 m (449 ft)
- Transmitter coordinates: 31°37′45.00″N 94°40′44.00″W

Links
- Public license information: Public file; LMS

KAXM (90.1 FM) is a college radio station, licensed to serve Nacogdoches, Texas, United States. The station is owned by Stephen F. Austin State University.

== See also ==
- Campus radio
- List of college radio stations in the United States
