= KUOZ-LP =

Radio station at the University of the Ozarks in Clarksville, Arkansas

- Clarksville, Arkansas; United States
- Frequency: 100.5 MHz

Programming
- Format: College

Ownership
- Owner: University of the Ozarks

History
- First air date: July 2, 2003
- Call sign meaning: University of the OZarks

Technical information
- Licensing authority: FCC
- Facility ID: 133949
- Class: L1
- ERP: 100 watts
- HAAT: -3.8 meters (-11 feet)
- Transmitter coordinates: 35°28′37″N 93°27′58″W

Links
- Public license information: LMS
- Website: KUOZ-LP

KUOZ-LP (100.5 FM) is a student-run college radio station licensed to serve Clarksville, Arkansas. The station is owned by the University of the Ozarks. It airs a College radio format.

The radio station is a six-time Intercollegiate Broadcasting System award-winner, including a second place with the show "The Big Show" by Alix Tiegs and "From The Concert Hall" by Corbin Sturch, Meredith Childre and Lauren Charters in the 'Best Specialty Show' category, and "Latino Fusion" by Cristhian Rodriguez in first place as the 'Best Foreign Language Show' in the United States.

The station was assigned the KUOZ-LP call letters by the Federal Communications Commission on July 2, 2003.

== See also ==
- Campus radio
- List of college radio stations in the United States
