= WAPX-FM =

- Clarksville, Tennessee; United States
- Frequency: 91.9 MHz
- Branding: Magic 91.9

Programming
- Format: college radio

Ownership
- Owner: Austin Peay State University
- Sister stations: APSU-TV

Technical information
- Licensing authority: FCC
- Facility ID: 3346
- Class: A
- ERP: 6,000 watts
- HAAT: 59.0 meters
- Transmitter coordinates: 36°32′13.00″N 87°21′26.00″W

Links
- Public license information: Public file; LMS
- Website: Official Website

WAPX-FM (91.9 FM) is a radio station licensed to Clarksville, Tennessee, United States. The station is currently owned by Austin Peay State University.

== See also ==
- Campus radio
- List of college radio stations in the United States
