= WSKB =

- Westfield, Massachusetts; United States
- Frequency: 89.5 MHz

Programming
- Format: College

Ownership
- Owner: Trustees of Westfield State University

History
- First air date: October 1974
- Call sign meaning: "Westfield State Kollege [sic] Broadcasting"

Technical information
- Licensing authority: FCC
- Facility ID: 72025
- Class: A
- ERP: 100 watts
- HAAT: −66 meters (−217 ft)
- Transmitter coordinates: 42°07′55″N 72°47′51″W

Links
- Public license information: Public file; LMS
- Webcast: Listen live
- Website: WSKB website

WSKB (89.5 FM) is a radio station licensed to serve Westfield State University and the Westfield, Massachusetts, area. The station is owned by the Trustees of Westfield State University. It airs a college radio modern rock format.

The station was assigned the WSKB call letters by the Federal Communications Commission and began operations in October 1974.

== See also ==
- Campus radio
- List of college radio stations in the United States
