= WUMS =

- University, Mississippi; United States
- Broadcast area: University/Oxford
- Frequency: 92.1 MHz
- Branding: 92.1 Rebel Radio

Programming
- Format: Top 40

Ownership
- Owner: Student Media Center of the University of Mississippi

History
- Call sign meaning: University of Mississippi

Technical information
- Licensing authority: FCC
- Facility ID: 63562
- Class: A
- ERP: 2,900 watts
- HAAT: 145 meters (476 ft)
- Transmitter coordinates: 34°24′12″N 89°24′13″W

Links
- Public license information: Public file; LMS
- Webcast: Listen live
- Website: myrebelradio.com

WUMS (92.1 FM, "Rebel Radio") is a student-run formatted college radio station in University, Mississippi. WUMS is owned and licensed by the Student Media Center of the University of Mississippi (Ole Miss). WUMS covers most of Lafayette County, Mississippi, which includes Oxford and University, with an ERP of 2,900 watts.

Rebel Radio is one of the few commercially licensed college radio stations in the country and is primarily run by students enrolled at Ole Miss.

== Programming ==
When not playing student shows, WUMS plays top 40 music during the day and hip-hop music at night. The original format of WUMS was a mixture between hot AC and rock music until August 2011 when the station changed the format to completely top 40. When this change happened, the station completely rebranded with a new website, new slogan, and new logo.

During the day, student DJs host shows and play their own music. They are typically given a 1-hour time slot per week where they are allowed to host their show. These shows can consist of any genre, ranging from talk radio to metal music. At all other times, the station's computer plays music from the catalog.

== DJs ==
At the beginning of the fall and spring semesters, Rebel Radio hosts auditions for new DJs. To become a DJ, students are required to be enrolled in at least 3 credit hours at the university and have a GPA of at least 2.0.

If accepted, DJs are assigned a weekly time slot where they, and any co-hosts, can come to the studio located in Bishop Hall and perform their show. In the studio, they have the ability to play their own music or music from Rebel Radio's catalog. Each semester, there are usually 40-50 DJs that have shows on Rebel Radio.

DJs do not get paid to host their shows, they are only volunteers. The station can be used as a résumé builder for students, giving them experience for future jobs.

== See also ==
- Campus radio
- List of college radio stations in the United States
