= KBHU-FM =

KBHU-FM and KJKT

Spearfish, South Dakota; United States
- Broadcast area: Western South Dakota and Eastern Wyoming
- Frequencies: KBHU-FM: 89.1 MHz; KJKT: 90.7 MHz
- Branding: The Buzz

Programming
- Format: Alternative/College radio

Ownership
- Owner: Black Hills State University
- Sister stations: KBHU-TV

History
- First air date: KBHU-FM: August 22, 1974
- Call sign meaning: KBHU-FM: Black Hills (State) University

Technical information
- Licensing authority: FCC
- Facility ID: KBHU-FM: 5472; KJKT: 92516
- Class: KBHU-FM: A; KJKT: C3
- ERP: KBHU-FM: 100 watts; KJKT: 700 watts
- HAAT: KBHU-FM: −106 meters (−348 ft); KJKT: 501 meters (1,644 ft)
- Transmitter coordinates: KBHU-FM: 44°29′48″N 103°52′13″W; KJKT: 44°19′42″N 103°50′3″W

Links
- Public license information: KBHU-FM: Public file; LMS; KJKT: Public file; LMS
- Webcast: Listen Live
- Website: Official website

KBHU-FM (89.1 FM) and KJKT (90.7 FM) are radio stations broadcasting a College radio format. Licensed to Spearfish, South Dakota, United States, the stations are currently owned by Black Hills State University.

KBHU-FM and KJKT-FM are affiliated with the Intercollegiate Broadcast Corporation and the National Association of Broadcasters.

== See also ==
- Campus radio
- List of college radio stations in the United States
