= WGSU =

Coordinates: 42.798°N 77.820°W

- Geneseo, New York; United States
- Broadcast area: Geneseo, New York, Genesee Valley
- Frequency: 89.3 MHz
- Branding: Geneseo’s Voice of the Valley

Programming
- Format: Alternative music

Ownership
- Owner: State University of New York at Geneseo; (State University of New York)

History
- First air date: February 18, 1963
- Call sign meaning: "Geneseo State University"

Technical information
- Licensing authority: FCC
- Class: A
- ERP: 1,800 watts
- HAAT: 3 meters (9.8 ft)

Links
- Public license information: Public file; LMS
- Webcast: Live Stream
- Website: wgsu.geneseo.edu

WGSU (89.3 FM) is a college radio station and broadcasts from Geneseo, New York, United States. The station is located on the campus of the State University of New York at Geneseo. It is managed by the college's Department of Communication and staffed primarily by students.

== History ==
In the early 1970s, the radio format, developed and executed by John Davlin, was known as a "continuum," a music appreciation concept in which show hosts were encouraged to mix music from various genres into sets that were both educational and aesthetically pleasing.

After Davlin's departure in 1976, WGSU continued to operate with a staff of student managers and programmers, providing the western New York region with a mix of rock, jazz, blues, World music (referred to at the time as "ethnic") and a smattering of classical music. A typical program during that period could include such artists as Pat Metheny, Bruce Cockburn, Karla Bonoff, Clifton Chenier, Thelonious Monk, Gentle Giant, Patti Smith. and Captain Beefheart.

WGSU is the home of Geneseo Ice Knights hockey, broadcasting all of their home and away games.

== See also ==
- College radio
- List of college radio stations in the United States
