= WMHC =

- South Hadley, Massachusetts; United States
- Broadcast area: Pioneer Valley
- Frequency: 91.5 MHz

Programming
- Format: College

Ownership
- Owner: Mount Holyoke College; (Trustees of Mount Holyoke College)

History
- First air date: May 14, 1957
- Former call signs: DWMHC (April 30, 1999 - August 9, 1999)

Technical information
- Licensing authority: FCC
- Facility ID: 68245
- Class: A
- ERP: 100 watts, Stereo
- HAAT: −5 meters (−16 ft)
- Transmitter coordinates: 42°15′12″N 72°34′40″W

Links
- Public license information: Public file; LMS
- Webcast: Listen Live
- Website: WMHC website

WMHC (91.5 FM) is a radio station licensed to serve South Hadley, Massachusetts. The station is owned by Mount Holyoke College and licensed to the Trustees of Mount Holyoke College. It airs a college radio format. The station claims to be one of the oldest broadcasting facilities in the United States completely run by women.

The station was reassigned the WMHC call letters by the Federal Communications Commission on August 9, 1999, after having been deleted from the FCC database on April 30, 1999.

Their most recent logo, a hand-drawn cassette tape, was designed by Ariel Hahn.

== See also ==
- Campus radio
- List of college radio stations in the United States
