= WASU-LP =

Radio station in Albany, Georgia, United States

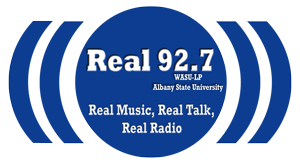
- Albany, Georgia; United States
- Broadcast area: Albany, Georgia
- Frequency: 92.7 MHz
- Branding: Real 92.7

Programming
- Format: Hip hop; talk; jazz

Ownership
- Owner: Albany State University

History
- Call sign meaning: Albany State University

Technical information
- Licensing authority: FCC
- Facility ID: 123997
- Class: L1
- ERP: 100 watts
- HAAT: 29.7 meters (97 ft)
- Transmitter coordinates: 31°34′2.00″N 84°8′22.00″W

Links
- Public license information: LMS
- Webcast: Listen live
- Website: asurams.edu/wasufm

WASU-LP (92.7 FM) is a radio station licensed to Albany, Georgia, United States. The station is currently owned by Albany State University. WASU's studios are located at The Broadcast Center inside the Mass Communication Department in the Billy C. Black building on the East Campus of ASU, and the transmitter is located nearby.

== See also ==
- Campus radio
- List of college radio stations in the United States
