= WFCF =

- St. Augustine, Florida; United States
- Frequencies: 88.5 MHz (Channel 203)

Programming
- Format: College radio

Ownership
- Owner: Flagler College

History
- First air date: November 1, 1993
- Call sign meaning: Flagler College

Technical information
- Licensing authority: FCC
- Facility ID: 21688
- Class: C3
- ERP: 10,000 watts horizontal 9,800 watts vertical (directional antenna)
- HAAT: 61.4 meters
- Transmitter coordinates: 29°51′17″N 81°20′9″W

Links
- Public license information: Public file; LMS
- Webcast: Listen live (via iHeartRadio)
- Website: WFCF Online

WFCF (88.5 FM) is a radio station broadcasting an eclectic college radio format. Licensed to St. Augustine, Florida, United States. The station is owned by Flagler College. The Federal Communications Commission originally issued the WFCF callsign on November 5, 1992. WFCF airs an eclectic mix of music and speech programming.

== See also ==
- Campus radio
- List of college radio stations in the United States
