= KTCC =

- Colby, Kansas; United States
- Frequency: 91.9 MHz
- Branding: T-92

Programming
- Format: College/Modern Rock

Ownership
- Owner: Colby Community College

History
- First air date: May 1974

Technical information
- Licensing authority: FCC
- Facility ID: 12220
- Class: A
- ERP: 3,000 watts
- HAAT: 55 meters (180 feet)
- Transmitter coordinates: 39°22′34″N 101°03′08″W

Links
- Public license information: Public file; LMS
- Webcast: Listen Live
- Website: Official Website

KTCC (91.9 FM, "T-92") is a radio station licensed to serve Colby, Kansas, United States. The station, which began broadcasting in May 1974, is owned and operated by Colby Community College.

KTCC broadcasts a modern rock-leaning college radio music format.

== See also ==
- Campus radio
- List of college radio stations in the United States
