= KSTM =

- Indianola, Iowa; United States
- Broadcast area: Indianola, IA
- Frequency: 88.9 MHz

Programming
- Format: college radio

Ownership
- Owner: Simpson College

Technical information
- Licensing authority: FCC
- Facility ID: 60467
- Class: A
- ERP: 100 watts
- HAAT: 38.0 meters
- Transmitter coordinates: 41°22′0.00″N 93°33′57.00″W

Links
- Public license information: Public file; LMS
- Website: Official Website

KSTM (88.9 FM) is a radio station licensed to Indianola, Iowa, United States. The station is owned by Simpson College.

== See also ==
- Campus radio
- List of college radio stations in the United States
