= WPCR-FM =

Coordinates: 43.757°N 71.689°W

- Plymouth, New Hampshire; United States
- Broadcast area: Plymouth, New Hampshire
- Frequency: 91.7 MHz
- Branding: WPCR

Programming
- Format: Non-commercial college radio

Ownership
- Owner: Plymouth State University

History
- Founded: November 17, 1968 (carrier current)
- First air date: September 29, 1973
- Call sign meaning: "Plymouth College Radio"

Technical information
- Licensing authority: FCC
- Facility ID: 52839
- Class: A
- ERP: 215 watts
- HAAT: −115 meters (−377 ft)

Links
- Public license information: Public file; LMS
- Webcast: Listen live
- Website: www.plymouth.edu/wpcr

WPCR-FM (91.7 FM), in Plymouth, New Hampshire, is the student-operated college radio station for Plymouth State University. The station is located in the Hartman Union Building (known on campus as the "HUB"), which serves as the school's center of student activity. WPCR has a wide variety of college radio programming spanning several genres of music, with a primary focus on smaller, independent record labels. The radio station is almost entirely student-run, and membership is available to interested students and staff after training.

== History ==
Then-Plymouth State College started a student-run, carrier current radio station using the WPCR designation on November 17, 1968. Originally located in the basement of Mary Lyon Hall, a women's dormitory where the male DJs had to be escorted out when the station shut down at night, WPCR relocated to larger quarters in Ernest L. Silver Hall the next year. A wide variety of students broadcast over the outlet; in 1971, these included Judy Hampton, a female sportscaster—unusual for the time—who was also blind, sat by the announcers at home athletic events, and delivered a nightly sports recap. Most of the station's music was Top 40, with records either donated or bought from Newberry's.

After planning began in 1970, Plymouth State received a construction permit to build a 10-watt FM radio station on December 4, 1972. While previously only audible in and near campus buildings, the station already had inklings of interest from the broader community; one station engineer heard reports that local residents would park near dorms listening to away football games. Students also raised money from the community to pay station debts; in 1976, one announcer, Peter Brunette, was on the air for four straight days as part of a radiothon to keep the station going through the end of the school year.

A growing need for student offices led to the college's acquisition of the former Tau Omega sorority house in 1986; the radio station and several other student organizations moved in the next year to the "CUB Annex", with WPCR-FM alone occupying the first floor. By 1988, WPCR boasted 48 student DJs. The station then moved into the new Hartman Union Building when it was completed in 1995. In the fall of 2024, WPCR boasted their highest active-DJ record of the mid-semester at 53 members.

== See also ==
- College radio
- List of college radio stations in the United States
