= WMSV =

Radio station at Mississippi State University in Starkville, Mississippi

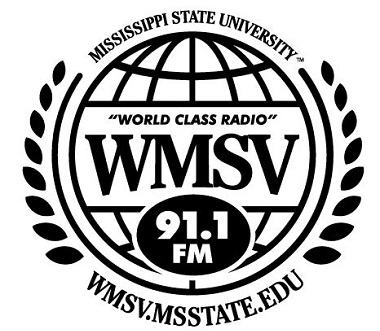
- Starkville, Mississippi; United States
- Broadcast area: Golden Triangle (Starkville, Columbus, West Point)
- Frequency: 91.1 MHz
- Branding: 91.1 The Junction

Programming
- Format: College radio

Ownership
- Owner: Mississippi State University

History
- First air date: March 21, 1994

Technical information
- Licensing authority: FCC
- Facility ID: 43173
- Class: C2
- ERP: 14,000 watts
- HAAT: 139 meters (456 ft)
- Transmitter coordinates: 33°25′56″N 88°45′00″W

Links
- Public license information: Public file; LMS
- Webcast: Listen live
- Website: wmsv.msstate.edu

WMSV (91.1 FM) is a radio station in Starkville, Mississippi located on the campus of Mississippi State University.

== History ==
Prior to WMSV, Mississippi State had a student-run radio station, WMSB, which went off the air permanently at the end of the spring semester of 1986. WMSB was a low-power FM station with studios on the top floor of Lee Hall. Marketed as "The Radio," the station's 10-watt, FM signal barely extended past the boundaries of the campus.

The station's album oriented rock (AOR) format was augmented with an hourly ten-to-fifteen minute jazz block. Additionally, weekend formatting was African-American oriented beginning in 1979. WORJ's News Blimp program was also broadcast.

WMSB was started during the fall semester of 1971 in a freshman dorm room on the third floor of Critz Hall, utilizing an FM stereo transmitter that was designed and built as a high school science fair project by one of the station's founders. The station's original call letters were RHOM. It was on air from 8:00-midnight each evening. Later, funding was solicited from the Student Association. With funding approved, the low-power RCA FM transmitter was ordered and the call letters WMSB were issued by the U.S. Federal Communications Commission (FCC). The station was moved to studios on the top floor of Lee Hall that had been occupied by a student-run AM station, and 10-watt WMSB hit the air in 1974 on 89.1 MHz.

=== WMSV - Radio With a Vision ===
Radio With a Vision logo (1994–1999)

On March 21, 1994, the campus radio station went back on the air after an eight-year absence, and on a new license. The station's new call letters were WMSV. The 14,000-watt station broadcast across a 50-60 mile radius around the campus and used the slogan "Radio With a Vision" (playing off the V in the station call letters, but also alluding to its format). When it began operations, the station played a blend of alternative rock and album oriented rock (AOR). The station also broadcast many specialty shows such as blues, jazz, new age, urban and a number of public affairs programs.

In the beginning, the station was run by more than 75 student volunteers with a paid general manager, Steve Ellis, on staff with the university.

WMSV quickly garnered two first place awards from the National Association of College Broadcasters in its first year of operations and numerous Gold Awards from the Mississippi Association of College Broadcasters. It was recognized as one of the College Music Journal's most influential college stations in the country.

By 1996, an assistant station manager, Scott Wilson, had been hired, but volunteers still worked in the capacity of DJs, music staffers, news reporters, anchors, specialty program hosts, public affairs program hosts and office staff.

=== WMSV - World Class Radio ===
World Class Radio logo (1999–2004)

In January 1999, WMSV changed its slogan to "World Class Radio". The decision to change the identifying logo/slogan of the station was due to the change in the music format to more of an Adult album alternative blend.

=== WMSV - 91.1 The Junction ===
On August 15, 2024, WMSV rebranded as "91.1 The Junction".

== News department ==
WMSV ran a dedicated news department from 1994-2007. In 1994, student news director Jay Houts was named the top news reporter in the country by the National Association of College Broadcasters. The next year, news director Norris Agnew earned the runner-up spot in news reporting at the 1995 NACB convention. In 1996, news director Suehyla El-Attar was a finalist for the country's top news reporting award. In 1997, news director Brian McCann received several awards for journalism from the Mississippi Associated Press.

The station had 30-minute news broadcasts that aired at 7:30am and 5:00pm with an additional 5-minute news update at noon. Utilizing local student reporters, combined with the nationally known Associated Press Wire Service, the station produced coverage of national, regional and local events as well as sport reports. Additionally, the station offered the Geosciences Department at MSU the opportunity to appoint student meteorologists within the Broadcast Meteorology Program to deliver weather updates.

In January 2001, the evening news broadcast was discontinued. This move was made to make room for a sports news program focusing on the Southeastern Conference.

== Sports department ==
In 2001, the station decided to put more emphasis on sports news in the afternoon and evening. The evening newscast was canceled to make room for the creation of "Bulldog Drive Time", which discussed Mississippi State sports and news. In 2006, this show was re-imagined, and "Southeastern Drive Time" (SDT) officially debuted. SDT was a one-hour sports program broadcast featuring discussion on current news in the Southeastern Conference.

== Public affairs department ==
As part of its non-commercial radio distinction, the station started a Public Affairs Department in 1994. The station aired a number of National Public Affairs shows following the 5 pm newscast. These included "The Health Show", "Special Assignment", "Fifty-one Percent", "The Environment Show" and "The Best of Our Knowledge". The station also produced many local shows such as "Focus on Faculty" hosted by Meredith Geuder of MSU's University Relations Department, which featured interviews with faculty and staff in the news at MSU; "American Dreams" hosted by Doug Bedsaul, which interviewed state and national politicians about hot topics in the context of popular music; and "On Campus", a student-produced program that featured interviews and news relevant to the MSU campus. These locally-produced shows were discontinued during later restructuring of the station.

== See also ==
- Campus radio
- List of college radio stations in the United States
