= WCFM =

- Williamstown, Massachusetts; United States
- Frequency: 91.9 MHz

Programming
- Format: Variety

Ownership
- Owner: Williams College; (The President & Trustees of Williams College)

History
- First air date: September 8, 1958
- Call sign meaning: "Williams College FM"

Technical information
- Licensing authority: FCC
- Facility ID: 66277
- Class: A
- ERP: 440 watts
- HAAT: −255 meters (−837 ft)
- Transmitter coordinates: 42°42′38.3″N 73°12′4.4″W

Links
- Public license information: Public file; LMS
- Webcast: Listen live
- Website: wcfm.nekoweb.org

WCFM (91.9 FM) is a radio station broadcasting a variety format. Licensed to Williamstown, Massachusetts, United States, the station is owned by Williams College. Shows are run by students, faculty and Williamstown community members.

== See also ==
- Campus radio
- List of college radio stations in the United States
