= KGRM =

Radio station in Grambling, Louisiana

- Grambling, Louisiana; United States
- Broadcast area: Ruston, Louisiana
- Frequency: 91.5 MHz

Programming
- Format: Variety

Ownership
- Owner: Grambling State University

History
- Call sign meaning: GRaMbling State University

Technical information
- Licensing authority: FCC
- Facility ID: 24741
- Class: C2
- ERP: 50,000 watts
- HAAT: 150 meters
- Transmitter coordinates: 32°30′56″N 92°43′27″W

Links
- Public license information: Public file; LMS
- Webcast: Listen Live
- Website: KGRM website

KGRM (91.5 FM) is a noncommercial educational radio station licensed to Grambling, Louisiana. The station is owned by Grambling State University and is operated by university students.

Established in 1973, KGRM currently broadcasts with an effective radiated power of 50,000 watts. Its airs a variety of music, news, and public affairs programming. The station's musical offerings include jazz, gospel, classic hits, and urban contemporary.

== See also ==
- Campus radio
- List of college radio stations in the United States
