= WCNI =

- New London, Connecticut; United States
- Broadcast area: Southeastern Connecticut
- Frequency: 90.9 MHz
- Branding: Radio Club

Programming
- Format: college; free-form radio

Ownership
- Owner: Connecticut College Community Radio, Inc.

History
- First air date: 1974

Technical information
- Licensing authority: FCC
- Facility ID: 13621
- Class: A
- ERP: 2,000 watts (vertical polarization only)
- HAAT: 57 meters
- Transmitter coordinates: 41°22′53″N 72°6′28″W

Links
- Public license information: Public file; LMS
- Webcast: Listen live (via iHeartRadio)
- Website: wcniradio.org

WCNI (90.9 FM), is a radio station licensed to serve New London, Connecticut, owned by Connecticut College Community Radio, Inc. The station airs a free-form radio format, and is operated by students and members of the community.

== History ==
WCNI was originally an on-campus AM radio station broadcast to Connecticut College students and staff, via low-power carrier current transmitters placed in college dormitories and facilities. The station filed an application with the Federal Communications Commission (FCC) on August 10, 1972, for 89.9 MHz. A series of opposition letters were filed by WGAL Television, Inc., owner of WTEV (channel 6) in New Bedford, Massachusetts, as a result Connecticut College modified its request to 91.5 MHz on May 10, 1973. A construction permit was granted on October 3, 1973, to allow WCNI to transmit on 91.5 MHz. The call sign was assigned by the FCC on March 11, 1974.

In 1974, WCNI made its debut on 91.5 MHz with ten watts of transmission power, one of a wave of college radio stations introduced in that era using low-power FM transmission facilities. Early station promotional spots created by student and staff member Ken Abel hailed it as having "less power than a common light bulb." Subsequent increases in transmission power led to a reassignment of its frequency to 91.1 MHz and eventually to the current 90.9 MHz. The original antenna tower for FM transmissions was erected atop Bill Hall on the Connecticut College campus using a World War II air raid siren tower as its base, modified by Connecticut College maintenance staff to hold a steel pipe which acted as an antenna mast. The antenna was subsequently relocated to a professionally installed tower next to the Crozier-Williams student center on the Connecticut College campus, adjacent to the station's studios and recording archives.

Early broadcasts of the FM radio station were wide-ranging, including a variety of music genres, old radio serial dramas, local history, and live performances. To raise funds for government-mandated emergency broadcast equipment, the station held its first on-air fund raising marathon in the spring of 1975. The early FM broadcast signal of WCNI was not strong, but the station had a notable body of off-campus listeners in the New London area and its on-air staff included non-student members from the community.

The station's proximity to the U.S. Navy submarine base across the Thames River in Groton, Connecticut and to the General Dynamics submarine manufacturing facility in Groton led to its nickname "Ground Zero Radio", in recognition of the region's presumed high priority as a Soviet nuclear strike site.

== See also ==
- Campus radio
- List of college radio stations in the United States
