= KICB =

Radio station at Iowa Central Community College in Fort Dodge, Iowa

- Fort Dodge, Iowa; United States
- Frequency: 88.1 (MHz)
- Branding: The Point

Programming
- Format: Alternative

Ownership
- Owner: Iowa Central Community College

History
- First air date: 1971
- Call sign meaning: Iowa Central Broadcasting

Technical information
- Licensing authority: FCC
- Facility ID: 29059
- Class: A
- ERP: 200 watts
- HAAT: 40 m (131 ft)
- Transmitter coordinates: 42°29′27″N 94°12′01″W

Links
- Public license information: Public file; LMS

KICB (88.1 FM) is a non-commercial radio station that serves the Fort Dodge, Iowa area. The station broadcasts an Alternative format. KICB is licensed to Iowa Central Community College.

Iowa Central Community College's Radio Broadcast Program uses the station to provide hands-on experience and training for students who are pursuing a career in the radio industry.

The transmitter and broadcast antenna are located on the campus. According to the FCC database, the antenna is mounted at 38 m (125 ft) above ground level. The calculated Height Above Average Terrain is 40 m (131 ft).

== See also ==
- Campus radio
- List of college radio stations in the United States
