= WBSU =

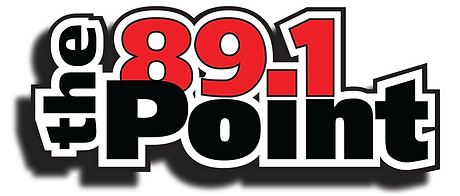
- Brockport, New York; United States
- Frequency: 89.1 MHz

Programming
- Format: mainstream rock; modern rock; top 40
- Affiliations: Associated Press; Pacifica Radio

Ownership
- Owner: State University of New York

History
- Call sign meaning: "Brockport State University"

Technical information
- Licensing authority: FCC
- Facility ID: 63118
- Class: B1
- ERP: 7,300 watts
- HAAT: 53 meters (174 feet)
- Transmitter coordinates: 43°12′45.20″N 77°57′16.00″W

Links
- Public license information: Public file; LMS
- Website: www.891thepoint.com

WBSU (89.1 FM "89.1 The Point") is a student-run radio station licensed to Brockport, New York. The station is owned by State University of New York, and operates from The College at Brockport.

== History ==
The Radio Club began at College at Brockport in the late 1950s and, shortly thereafter, efforts began to acquire an FM frequency. Starting in 1957, the Radio Club began broadcasting via public address to the student union on the Brockport campus. On May 1, 1964, the station, then known as WBSN began transmitting to the entire campus via telephone lines. In January 1970, the station moved into its present facilities in the Seymour College Union and became WBSU-AM at 600 kHz over what was known as a "carrier current" system that used campus electrical lines as an antenna.

Following many years of hard work and patience, WBSU-FM was born on January 14, 1981, with 10 watts at 88.9. Thanks to the efforts of many people including the FM Task Force, Lloyd Trufelman, Dr, Melvin Smagorinsky, Edward Rothstein, Chief Engineer Bernard Lynch, Brian Issacson, Dr. Fred Powell, Martha Walstrum, Frank Filardo, Terrin Hover, Harry Goldberg, Scott Fishman and many others, the dream finally became a reality. The first general manager was David Van Wie and he spearheaded an immediate power increase to 150 watts in May of that year. Following Van Wie four years later was Timothy Lyman, who was instrumental in the May 1989 move to 89.1 at 7,338 watts where The Point now stands. The station's Broadcast Electronics 3.5 kW transmitter and 3-bay directional Shivley Labs antenna sits atop Mortimer Hall - a 12-story dormitory.

Under the leadership of general manager Warren Kozireski, the 1990s brought much technological change to the station starting with a new Orban Optimod 8100 signal processor in the transmitter. WBSU implemented a computerized music playlist in 1992, new studio consoles in 1992 and 1994, and digital equipment during the summer of 1995. The Point's web site was created in 1997 and began webcasting in 1999. Digital audio editing came in 2005.

WBSU-FM became 89.1 the Point with a new logo on June 10, 1998, in an effort to simplify the stations nickname. The hope was to make it easier to remember and make the station more marketable.

The station upgraded each of its four studios to Wheatstone E-6 consoles from 2010-2018 and changed its audio playback software from AudioVailt (started in 1997) to Zetta in January 2019.

State (New York State Broadcasters Association) and national (National Association of Collegiate Broadcasters, College Broadcasters, Inc., College Media Association and Broadcast Education Association) organizations have recognized the station for its achievements 35 times in the last 32 years including in competition with professional stations.

== Programming ==
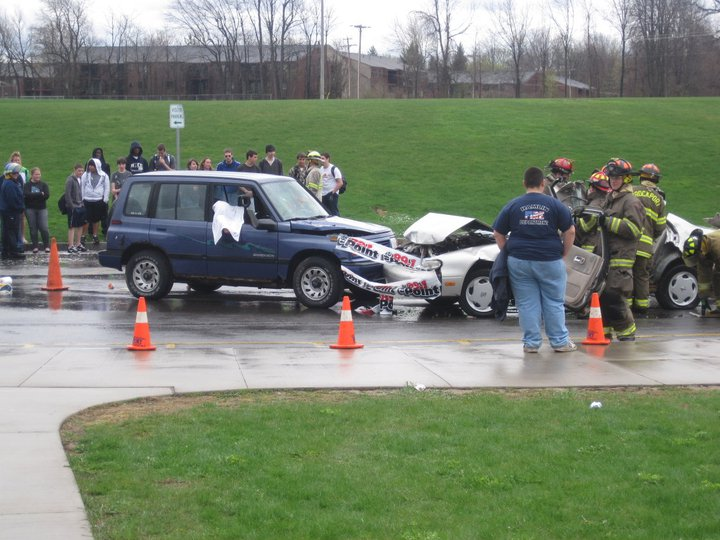
In May 2011, the Point worked with Brockport's Fire and Police department to encourage High School students at Brockport High School to not drink and drive.

WBSU is run by volunteer students at The College at Brockport and plays Top 40, Rock, and Alternative music. The Point also takes song requests at (585)395-2500 from the local community. There are several different programs featured on the station.

== Sports ==
The station has a large sports department that provides play by play for many SUNY Brockport sports teams as well as local high school football contests during the fall. WBSU also provides coverage of Section V and Section VI high school athletics, Division I, II and III NCAA athletics, and area pro teams including the Buffalo Bisons, Buffalo Sabres, Rochester Americans, Rochester Red Wings and others.

== Wake Up Show, 5:00/11:00 Reports ==
The Wake Up show is from 6:00-9:00 am Monday to Friday and features AP Radio News, local news and sports, and Western New York weather multiple times during the morning. The 5:00 report is very similar to the Wake Up Show, in that it has AP Radio News, local news and sports, and Western New York weather, but also features a local pet that is up for adoption. The 11:00 report features sports news and Western New York weather.

== Premiere Party ==
Every week, The Point brings in new music from song artists who have just released new singles. The Point has featured new songs from artists such as Katy Perry, Mumford & Sons, Avenged Sevenfold, Lady Gaga, Death Cab for Cutie, and more. The Premiere Party is every Wednesday night at 7:00.

== The Starting Point ==
The Starting Point is a specialty program on 89.1 The Point that features local community artists with the focus on exposing them in the community. The Starting Point is every night at 6:00 and feature a local artist once every two hours. Starting Point artists can be found on The Point's website.

== Aughts at 8 ==
Every weekday at 8:00 pm, The Point plays songs from the 90's and early 2000's.

== Hit 26 ==
Hit 26 is a countdown of The Point's top songs of the week. It's a collaboration of several different charts meshed into one countdown and airs every Sunday from 4-6pm. It also features new music and songs that have been hastily moving up different charts. Just before the No. 1 song of the week, The Point plays the No. 1 song from one year ago.

== Metal Inquisition ==
From 1988 to 1992, WBSU was the home to the Metal Inquisition every Thursday night from 11:00 pm to the station's 2:00 am sign off, which was played over a bed of instrumental metal such as Guy Mann Dude's "On the Verge" or The Great Kat's "Beethoven Mosh". Hosted by Trevor Bailey and successor Lester Wilson, the hosts would turn the transmitter power up to 105% and start off with Piledriver's "Metal Inquisition" and featured a playlist of mostly listener requests that overloaded the studio telephone system and whatever new stuff that they played in exchange for free concert tickets and merchandise from the record labels.

== See also ==
- College radio
- List of college radio stations in the United States
