= KCNT =

- Hastings, Nebraska; United States
- Broadcast area: Hastings
- Frequency: 88.1 MHz

Programming
- Format: contemporary hit radio

Ownership
- Owner: Central Community College

Technical information
- Licensing authority: FCC
- Facility ID: 9969
- Class: A
- ERP: 2,300 watts
- HAAT: 55 meters
- Transmitter coordinates: 40°34′52.00″N 98°19′58.00″W

Links
- Public license information: Public file; LMS
- Webcast: KCNT Streaming

KCNT (88.1 FM) is a radio station broadcasting a contemporary hit radio format. Licensed to Hastings, Nebraska, United States, the station serves the Hastings area. The station is owned by Central Community College.

== See also ==
- Campus radio
- List of college radio stations in the United States
