= WUSM-FM =

Radio station at the University of Southern Mississippi

- Hattiesburg, Mississippi; United States
- Broadcast area: Hattiesburg-Laurel
- Frequency: 88.5 MHz
- Branding: Southern Miss Radio

Programming
- Language: English
- Format: Adult Album Alternative/Americana (music)/Eclectic

Ownership
- Owner: University of Southern Mississippi

History
- First air date: July 1, 1972; 53 years ago
- Former call signs: WMSU (1972–1989)
- Former frequencies: 91.1 MHz (1972–1984)
- Call sign meaning: University of Southern Mississippi

Technical information
- Licensing authority: FCC
- Facility ID: 69214
- Class: A
- ERP: 3,000 watts
- HAAT: 129.3 meters (424 ft)
- Transmitter coordinates: 31°18′26.20″N 89°24′47.40″W

Links
- Public license information: Public file; LMS
- Webcast: Listen live
- Website: Official website

WUSM-FM (88.5 FM, "Southern Miss Radio") is a non-commercial radio station broadcasting an adult album alternative format. Licensed to Hattiesburg, Mississippi, United States, the station serves the Hattiesburg-Laurel area. The station is currently owned by the University of Southern Mississippi.

WUSM offers a variety of public affairs programs and music that would otherwise not be available. WUSM's diverse programming includes American roots music, jazz, blues, adult album alternative, alternative rock, and local artists.

== History ==
WUSM embarked on a major awareness campaign in January 2011. Starting with a yearly golf tournament, A Round for Roots Radio, Roots Radio 88.5 spent 2011 engaging in a social media campaign to raise awareness and listenership in the community. WUSM hosted a series of concerts in conjunction with fall football games on the University of Southern Mississippi campus. Known as the WUSM Tailgate Concert Series, eight artists played tailgating events at the home games in 2011. Starting with Southbound Crescent on September 3, the free concerts were broadcast live on WUSM.

WUSM also co-promoted a live concert with The Saenger Theatre and 206 Front with Leon Redbone on September 26. WUSM is also promoting a monthly series of live concerts in Hattiesburg featuring local, regional, and national acts that will be fund raising events for the radio station.

== See also ==
- Campus radio
- List of college radio stations in the United States
