= KHDX =

Radio station at Hendrix College in Conway, Arkansas

- Conway, Arkansas; United States
- Broadcast area: Conway, Arkansas
- Frequency: 93.1 MHz

Programming
- Format: College Radio

Ownership
- Owner: Hendrix College

History
- First air date: 1973
- Call sign meaning: HenDriX College (HDX is a popular abbreviation for Hendrix)

Technical information
- Licensing authority: FCC
- Facility ID: 26912
- Class: D
- ERP: 8 watts
- HAAT: 18.0 meters
- Transmitter coordinates: 35°06′01″N 92°26′26″W

Links
- Public license information: Public file; LMS
- Website: khdx.fm

KHDX (93.1 FM) is the student-run radio station at Hendrix College in Conway, Arkansas, United States. The station and the FCC license belong to the college.

== Facility ==
In January 2010, KHDX moved from its long-time home in now-closed Hulen Hall to the college's new Student Life and Technology Center. Because the antenna height was increased, at that time the FCC required the station to lower its power output from 8 watts to 5 watts to compensate for what would have otherwise been an increase in the station's service area.

== General ==
Hendrix College students each year apply for spots to host their own radio shows. Each slot is one to two hours long and students are encouraged to bring guests on and play music to promote the college. Because Hendrix College is a rather diverse campus, expect to hear a wide variety of content on dependent on the time of day. In the afternoon when students are finished with courses, the radio has a lighter mood for students to listen to while they're cramming in the Bailey Library or having study dates at a local coffee shop. Typically at night the radio shows are less structured and are treated as the graveyard shift. During these slots, rap and R&B songs are played with a mix of friendly (or not so friendly) commentary on public topics such as politics, sports, school banter and other zany topics. While students are away from campus over Summer and Winter Breaks, a queue of ad free music selected by administrators and students is shuffled endlessly while the booth is empty. Local Conway residents can tune in by setting their radios to 93.1 FM, or if you live outside of local air range the station is free for all to listen to online at KHDX.fm

== See also ==
- Campus radio
- List of college radio stations in the United States
