= KBYS (FM) =

Radio station at McNeese State University in Lake Charles, Louisiana

Lake Charles, Louisiana; United States
- Frequency: 88.3 MHz
- Branding: "KBYS"

Programming
- Format: Community radio

Ownership
- Owner: McNeese State University

Technical information
- Licensing authority: FCC
- Facility ID: 172777
- Class: A
- ERP: 15,000 watts
- HAAT: 90 metres (300 ft)
- Transmitter coordinates: 30°13′48.30″N 93°12′56.40″W

Links
- Public license information: Public file; LMS
- Webcast: Listen Live
- Website: www.kbys.fm

KBYS (88.3 FM) is an American radio station licensed to Lake Charles, Louisiana. The station is owned by McNeese State University, and airs a community radio format.

The station was assigned the KBYS call letters by the Federal Communications Commission on June 15, 2011.

== See also ==
- Campus radio
- List of college radio stations in the United States
