= WRTC-FM =

Hartford, Connecticut; United States
- Broadcast area: Greater Hartford
- Frequency: 89.3 (MHz)

Programming
- Format: Diversified

Ownership
- Owner: Trinity College; (Trustees of Trinity College)

History
- First air date: February 26, 1947; 78 years ago
- Former frequencies: 620 kHz (1947–1949); 550 kHz (1949–1950); 620 kHz (1950–1956)
- Call sign meaning: "Radio Trinity College"

Technical information
- Licensing authority: FCC
- Facility ID: 68255
- Class: A
- ERP: 300 watts
- HAAT: 29 meters (95 ft)
- Transmitter coordinates: 41°45′6.3″N 72°41′27.3″W

Links
- Public license information: Public file; LMS
- Webcast: Listen live
- Website: www.wrtcfm.com

WRTC-FM (89.3 MHz) is a non-commercial, student-run music radio station licensed to Hartford, Connecticut. Owned and operated by Trinity College, the station's weekly schedule features programs focused on specific genres, primarily rock, jazz, and urban contemporary.

== History and programming ==
WRTC began broadcasting as campus station on February 26, 1947 and received its FCC license on June 30, 1958. The station's programming includes music and artist interviews, spanning a wide range of genres, including jazz, techno, progressive, and world music.

The station also airs shows about local politics and public affairs on The Community Talk Show, a bi-weekly panel discussion exploring topics ranging from social welfare, healthcare, and politics to economic development, law enforcement, and unemployment. The station's sportscasters provide home and away game coverage of the Bantams in NESCAC football during the fall.

WRTC-FM has hosted multiple music festivals in Hartford. In 2015, the station's Southern soul show Greasy Tracks celebrated its 20-year-anniversary.

== See also ==
- Campus radio
- List of college radio stations in the United States
