= KRNL-FM =

Mount Vernon, Iowa; United States
- Frequency: 89.7 MHz

Programming
- Format: Defunct (was college radio)

Ownership
- Owner: Cornell College

History
- First air date: 1965
- Last air date: 2020
- Call sign meaning: Cornell

Technical information
- Licensing authority: FCC
- Facility ID: 13908
- Class: A
- ERP: 45 watts
- HAAT: 51 meters (167 ft)
- Transmitter coordinates: 41°55′34.00″N 91°25′32.00″W

Links
- Public license information: Public file; LMS

KRNL-FM (89.7 FM) was a radio station licensed to Mount Vernon, Iowa, United States. The station was owned by Cornell College and provided a creative, insightful outlook to Cornell student listeners, the surrounding community, and web listeners around the country. KRNL-FM was silent during the summer.

KRNL-FM's license was cancelled by the Federal Communications Commission on September 10, 2020. Currently, the station has moved to a streaming platform.
