= KCAC (FM) =

- Camden, Arkansas; United States
- Frequency: 89.5 MHz
- Branding: KC 89

Programming
- Format: Alternative rock

Ownership
- Owner: Southern Arkansas University – Technical Branch

History
- First air date: 1993

Technical information
- Licensing authority: FCC
- Facility ID: 8467
- Class: C3
- ERP: 10,000 watts
- HAAT: 98.7 meters (324 ft)
- Transmitter coordinates: 33°39′16″N 92°40′34″W

Links
- Public license information: Public file; LMS
- Website: Official Website

KCAC (89.5 FM, "KC 89") is a non-commercial educational radio station broadcasting an alternative rock music format. Licensed to Camden, Arkansas, United States, the station is currently owned by Southern Arkansas University – Technical Branch.

== History ==
The Federal Communications Commission issued a construction permit for the station to Camden Fairview School District, through its licensee Camden Career Center, on May 29, 1990. The station was assigned the KCAC call sign on June 14, 1990, and received its license to cover on April 1, 1993. The station's license was assigned by Camden Fairview School District to the current owner, Southern Arkansas University, on August 25, 2005, at a purchase price of $1.00.

== See also ==
- Campus radio
- List of college radio stations in the United States
