= KTSC-FM =

Radio station in Pueblo, Colorado

- Pueblo, Colorado; United States
- Frequency: 89.5 MHz
- Branding: Rev 89

Programming
- Format: Triple-A

Ownership
- Owner: Colorado State University-Pueblo; (Board of Governors of the Colorado State University System)

History
- First air date: October 1970

Technical information
- Licensing authority: FCC
- Facility ID: 69148
- Class: C3
- ERP: 8,000 watts
- HAAT: 55 meters (180 ft)
- Transmitter coordinates: 38°18′38″N 104°34′41.9″W

Links
- Public license information: Public file; LMS

KTSC-FM (89.5 FM, "REV 89") is a noncommercial radio station broadcasting a Triple-A format. Licensed to Pueblo, Colorado, United States, the station serves the Pueblo area. The station is owned by Colorado State University-Pueblo.

== History ==
Former logo

KTSC-FM has been on the air since October 1970. The station adopted the "Rev 89" moniker in 1995. It went through many format changes over the years but REV 89 remained a student operated station. Past formats included hard rock/metal (prior to 1995), modern rock/alternative (1995–1998), Top 40 (1998–2002, 2009–2017), and rhythmic (2002–2009). The current adult hits format has been in effect since December 26, 2017, after stunting with all Christmas music.

Rev 89 topped the Arbitron ratings for the first time in the spring of 2003. In the fall of 2008, Rev 89 was the #3 station in the Pueblo market with a minimum of 7,000 listeners every 15 minutes. The audience was primarily ages 12–24 men and women, mixed with a solid base of listeners in the 24-36 age group.

== See also ==
- Campus radio
- List of college radio stations in the United States
