= 88.3 FM =

FM radio frequency

The following radio stations broadcast on FM frequency 88.3 MHz:

== Argentina ==
- Radio Collection 88.3 MHz - Ciudad Autónoma de Buenos Aires
- 88.3 in La Plata, Buenos Aires
- Ciudad de Totoras in Totoras, Santa Fe
- Horizonte (radio station) in El Volcán, San Luis
- La Tecno in Villa Dominico, Buenos Aires
- LRS307 Génesis in Felicia, Santa Fe
- Pop Bahia in Bahia Blanca, Buenos Aires
- R80 in Buenos Aires
- Radio Ciudad in Goya, Corrientes
- Radio Cristiana in Munro, Buenos Aires
- Radio María in Ushuaia, Tierra del Fuego
- Radio Sur in Buenos Aires
- Wox FM in Rosario, Santa Fe

== Australia ==
- 88.3 Southern FM in Melbourne, Victoria

== Canada (Channel 202) ==
- CBF-FM-15 in Rivière-Rouge, Quebec
- CBFX-FM-3 in Amos, Quebec
- CBLJ-FM in Wawa, Ontario
- CBM-FM-3 in Iqaluit, Nunavut
- CBPI-FM-1 in Waterton Park, Alberta
- CBQT-FM in Thunder Bay, Ontario
- CBUO-FM in Fort Nelson, British Columbia
- CBYJ-FM in Fort St. John, British Columbia
- CFAK-FM in Sherbrooke, Quebec
- CIKX-FM-1 in Plaster Rock, New Brunswick
- CJIQ-FM in Paris, Ontario
- CJLU-FM-1 in Wolfville, Nova Scotia
- CKIA-FM in Quebec City, Quebec
- CKXU-FM in Lethbridge, Alberta
- VF2460 in Ymir, British Columbia

== China ==
- CNR China Traffic Radio in Guiyang
- Radio Foshan Gaoming Radio in Foshan
- CNR Music Radio in Lanzhou
- Huizhou General Radio

== Japan ==
- JOAV-FM in Minato

== Malaysia ==
- 8FM in Seremban, Negeri Sembilan
- Radio Klasik in Ipoh, Perak

== Mexico ==
- XHCSGL-FM in San Carlos, Guaymas municipality, Sonora
- XHDCP-FM in Ario de Rosales, Michoacán
- XHGJO-FM in Guelatao de Juárez, Oaxaca
- XHPCTN-FM in Compostela-Tepic, Nayarit
- XHPCZA-FM in Chignahuapan-Zacatlán-Ahuazotepec, Puebla
- XHSJI-FM in San José Iturbide, Guanajuato
- XHPVAT-FM in Maravatío, Michoacán
- XHRPR-FM in Tuxtla Gutiérrez, Chiapas
- XHTEJ-FM in Tejupilco de Hidalgo, Estado de México

== New Zealand ==
- Various low-power stations up to 1 watt

== Philippines ==
- DWJM in Manila, Philippines
- DWGO-FM in Legazpi City, Philippines
- DYRQ in Sagay
- DYAP-FM in Cebu City, Philippines
- DXWC in Zamboanga City, Philippines
- DXDR in Davao City, Philippines

== Russia ==
- Retro FM in Moscow
- Retro FM in Yuzhno-Sakhalinsk
- Avtoradio in Vladivostok
- DFM in Yekaterinburg

== Singapore ==
- 883Jia in Singapore

== United Kingdom ==
- BBC Radio 2 in Angus, East Ayrshire, Isle of Lewis, Millburn Muir, Shetland, Snowdonia, South Newry, Trowbridge, Ullapool, W. Midlands, Wensleydale, Windermere
- University Radio York in York

== United States (Channel 202) ==
List content confirmed against FCC licensure data.

- KABF in Little Rock, Arkansas
- KAFR in Willis, Texas
- KAIX in Casper, Wyoming
- KAPI in Ruston, Louisiana
- KAWK in Coalinga, California
- KAWV in Alice, Texas
- KAXL in Greenacres, California
- KBCM in Blytheville, Arkansas
- KBJQ in Bronson, Kansas
- KBKO in Kodiak, Alaska
- KBMK in Bismarck, North Dakota
- KBNR in Brownsville, Texas
- KBPN in Brainerd, Minnesota
- KBTG in Buffalo, Wyoming
- KBVM in Portland, Oregon
- KBWW in Broken Bow, Oklahoma
- KBYS in Lake Charles, Louisiana
- KCCK in Cedar Rapids, Iowa
- KCLU-FM in Thousand Oaks, California
- KCPC in Camino, California
- KCVP in Pierre, South Dakota
- KEQQ-LP in Grand Forks, North Dakota
- KESD (FM) in Brookings, South Dakota
- KEUR-LP in Eureka, Montana
- KFFR in Winter Park, Colorado
- KFMP in Meade, Kansas
- KGSY in McCall, Idaho
- KGUA in Gualala, California
- KHNW in Manson, Washington
- KIEE in St. Martinville, Louisiana
- KIPH in Hana, Hawaii
- KITF in International Falls, Minnesota
- KJAB in Mexico, Missouri
- KJCG in Missoula, Montana
- KJCL in Fergus Falls, Minnesota
- KJGM in Bastrop, Louisiana
- KJGT in Waconia, Minnesota
- KJRN in Keene, Texas
- KJRT in Amarillo, Texas
- KJSB in Jonesboro, Arkansas
- KJTS in New Ulm, Minnesota
- KJTT in Story City, Iowa
- KKAG (FM) in Grangeville, Idaho
- KKLG in Newton, Iowa
- KLHK in Hobbs, New Mexico
- KLJV in Scottsbluff, Nebraska
- KLMP in Rapid City, South Dakota
- KLNB in Grand Island, Nebraska
- KLVC in Magalia, California
- KLVN in Livingston, California
- KLYT in Albuquerque, New Mexico
- KMLT in Jackson, Wyoming
- KMLW in Moses Lake, Washington
- KMRE in Bellingham, Washington
- KMUR in Bullhead City, Arizona
- KOEG in Walters, Oklahoma
- KOLB in Hartington, Nebraska
- KOSR (FM) in Stillwater, Oklahoma
- KOUI in Mount Pleasant, Texas
- KPAC (FM) in San Antonio, Texas
- KPRH in Montrose, Colorado
- KPYR in Craig, Colorado
- KQIQ in Beatrice, Nebraska
- KQLF in Ottumwa, Iowa
- KQQM in Miles City, Montana
- KRAF in Fort Stockton, Texas
- KRHJ in Lamar, Colorado
- KRTG in Carthage, Texas
- KSBC in Nile, Washington
- KSDS in San Diego, California
- KSRG in Ashland, Oregon
- KTCN in Acton, California
- KTGS in Tishomingo, Oklahoma
- KTGT in Thief River Falls, Minnesota
- KTHN-LP in Texarkana, Texas
- KTPL in Pueblo, Colorado
- KUCR in Riverside, California
- KUUB in Salt Lake City, Utah
- KUXU in Monroe, Utah
- KVCO in Concordia, Kansas
- KVCP in Phoenix, Arizona
- KVRK in Chickaloon, Alaska
- KVXO in Fort Collins, Colorado
- KWIS in Plummer, Idaho
- KWND in Springfield, Missouri
- KXUA in Fayetteville, Arkansas
- KXJT in Rio Grande City, Texas
- KYEC in Doniphan, Missouri
- KYFW in Wichita, Kansas
- KYPW in Wolf Point, Montana
- KYSA in Sparks, Nevada
- KZLR in Fairbanks, Alaska
- WAER in Syracuse, New York
- WAFJ in Belvedere, South Carolina
- WAFR in Tupelo, Mississippi
- WAIF in Cincinnati, Ohio
- WANH in Meredith, New Hampshire
- WAPR in Selma, Alabama
- WARA-FM in New Washington, Indiana
- WAUI in Shelby, Ohio
- WAWF in Kankakee, Illinois
- WAWH in Dublin, Georgia
- WAYP in Marianna, Florida
- WAYQ in Clarksville, Tennessee
- WBGO in Newark, New Jersey
- WBIA in Shelbyville, Tennessee
- WBIY in La Belle, Florida
- WBMT in Boxford, Massachusetts
- WBWC in Berea, Ohio
- WCBN in Ann Arbor, Michigan
- WCIN in Bath, New York
- WCOB in State College, Pennsylvania
- WCOU in Warsaw, New York
- WCQR in Kingsport, Tennessee
- WCXK in Kalamazoo, Michigan
- WDCV in Carlisle, Pennsylvania
- WDGC in Downers Grove, Illinois
- WDSO in Chesterton, Indiana
- WDTE in Grosse Point Shores, Michigan
- WEAX in Angola, Indiana
- WEBF in Lerose, Kentucky
- WEJC in White Star, Michigan
- WEVS in Nashua, New Hampshire
- WFEN in Rockford, Illinois
- WFSO in Olivebridge, New York
- WGAO in Franklin, Massachusetts
- WGBZ in Ocean City, Maryland
- WGNK in Pennsuco, Florida
- WHCM in Palatine, Illinois
- WHJR in Murphysboro, Illinois
- WHWC in Menomonie, Wisconsin
- WHWN in Painesville, Ohio
- WHZN in New Whiteland, Indiana
- WIQH in Concord, Massachusetts
- WIUS in Macomb, Illinois
- WJCK (FM) in Piedmont, Alabama
- WJLY in Ramsey, Illinois
- WJUV in Cullman, Alabama
- WKIW in Ironwood, Michigan
- WKMV in Muncie, Indiana
- WKPK in Michigamme, Michigan
- WLAB in Fort Wayne, Indiana
- WLFC in Findlay, Ohio
- WLIW-FM in Southampton, New York
- WLKA in Tafton, Pennsylvania
- WLPT in Jesup, Georgia
- WLSF in Starke, Florida
- WLVV (FM) in Midland, Maryland
- WLXK in Boiling Springs, North Carolina
- WLYG in Jasper, Georgia
- WMBJ in Murrells Inlet, South Carolina
- WMRT in Marietta, Ohio
- WMTS in Murfreesboro, Tennessee
- WNFA in Port Huron, Michigan
- WNIN in Evansville, Indiana
- WNUB in Northfield, Vermont
- WOAR in South Vienna, Ohio
- WOTC in Edinburg, Virginia
- WPJC in Pontiac, Illinois
- WPLH in Tifton, Georgia
- WPOZ in Orlando, Florida
- WPPR in Demorest, Georgia
- WQHE in Oil City, Pennsylvania
- WQIQ in Spotsylvania, Virginia
- WQRI in Bristol, Rhode Island
- WRBH in New Orleans, Louisiana
- WRCC in Dibrell, Tennessee
- WRCT in Pittsburgh, Pennsylvania
- WRGC-FM in Milledgeville, Georgia
- WRLJ in White Hall, Illinois
- WRPS in Rockland, Massachusetts
- WRUO in Mayaguez, Puerto Rico
- WRVL in Lynchburg, Virginia
- WSBU in Saint Bonaventure, New York
- WSGP in Glasgow, Kentucky
- WSGR in New Boston, Ohio
- WSHJ in Southfield, Michigan
- WSMZ-FM in Crystal Valley, Michigan
- WTCY in Greilickville, Michigan
- WTIO in Mainesburg, Pennsylvania
- WUAW in Erwin, North Carolina
- WUTU in Sasser, Georgia
- WVBH (FM) in Beach Haven West, New Jersey
- WVCR in Loudonville, New York
- WVRL in Elizabeth City, North Carolina
- WWEC in Elizabethtown, Pennsylvania
- WXAV in Chicago, Illinois
- WXBE in Beaufort, North Carolina
- WXLS in Tupper Lake, New York
- WXOU in Auburn Hills, Michigan
- WXTS in Toledo, Ohio
- WXUT in Toledo, Ohio
- WYAR in Yarmouth, Maine
- WYBQ in Leesport, Pennsylvania
- WYBX in Key West, Florida
- WYLV in Maynardville, Tennessee
- WYZX in East Falmouth, Massachusetts
- WZRD in Chicago, Illinois
- WZXE in East Nottingham, Pennsylvania
- WZXQ in Chambersburg, Pennsylvania
