= List of radio stations in Nayarit =

This is a list of CRT-licensed radio stations in the state of Nayarit, Mexico.

Radio stations in Nayarit
Call sign	Frequency	Location	Owner	Name	Format
XEGNAY-AM	550 AM	Tepic	Government of the State of Nayarit	Aztlán Radio	Public radio
XETD-AM (Note: Bound to XHETD-FM 92.5, which must keep XETD-AM on the air until there are no listeners in its service area unserved by other radio stations.)	570 AM	Tecuala	Comunicación Integral de Nayarit, S.A. de C.V.	La Patrona (Note: Format is aimed at Escuinapa in Sinaloa.)	Regional Mexican
XEJMN-AM	750 AM	Jesús María	Instituto Nacional de los Pueblos Indígenas	La Voz de los Cuatro Pueblos	Indigenous
XETEY-AM (Note: Combo with XHTEY-FM 93.7)	840 AM	Tepic	XETEY-AM, S.A. de C.V.	Fiesta La Más Picuda	Regional Mexican
XHPCTN-FM	88.3 FM	Compostela	Radio Informativa, S.A. de C.V.	La Lupe	Adult hits
XHLUP-FM	89.1 FM	El Conchal–Compostela	Adacari Bus, S.A. de C.V.	Estéreo Sol	Regional Mexican
XHCCBH-FM	91.3 FM	Compostela	Grupo BD Cast, S.A. de C.V.	La Patrona	Regional Mexican
XHUX-FM	92.1 FM	Tepic	Master Radio de Occidente, S.A. de C.V.	Lokura Pop	Pop
XHETD-FM	92.5 FM	Tecuala	Comunicación Integral de Nayarit, S.A. de C.V.	La Patrona (Note: Format is aimed at Escuinapa in Sinaloa.)	Regional Mexican
XHZE-FM	92.9 FM	Santiago Ixcuintla	Radio Nayarita, S.A. de C.V.	La Poderosa	Regional Mexican
XHTEY-FM	93.7 FM	Tepic	XETEY-AM, S.A. de C.V.	Fiesta La Más Picuda	Regional Mexican
XHSI-FM	94.5 FM	Santiago Ixcuintla	Rubén Darío Mondragón Rivera	Radio Positiva	Regional Mexican
XHPY-FM	95.3 FM	Tepic	XHPY-FM, S.A. de C.V.	Stereo Vida	Adult contemporary
XHCJU-FM	95.9 FM	Jarretaderas	New Digital NX, S.A. de C.V.	Ke Buena	Regional Mexican
XHEOO-FM	96.1 FM	Tepic	XEOO-AM, S.A. de C.V.	Love FM	Romantic
XHCCBI-FM	96.5 FM	Ahuacatlán–Ixtlán del Río	Radio-Televisión Digital de Nayarit, S.A. de C.V.	La Mejor	Regional Mexican
XHNF-FM	97.7 FM	Tepic	XHNF, S.A. de C.V.	La Nayarita	Regional Mexican
XHLH-FM	98.1 FM	Acaponeta	Comunicación Integral de Nayarit, S.A. de C.V.	La Patrona	Regional Mexican
XHEPIC-FM	98.5 FM	Tepic	XEPIC-AM, S.A. de C.V.	Arroba FM	Pop
XHCCBJ-FM	99.3 FM	Tepic	Grupo BD Cast, S.A. de C.V.	La Mejor	Regional Mexican
XHCJX-FM	99.9 FM	Cruz de Huanacaxtle	Stereorey México, S.A.	La Mejor	Regional Mexican
XHTNY-FM	100.3 FM	Tepic	Government of the State of Nayarit	Aztlán Radio	Public radio
XHSK-FM	100.7 FM	Ruiz	Radio Ruíz, S.A. de C.V.	Ke Buena	Regional Mexican
XHUANT-FM	101.1 FM	Tepic	Universidad Autónoma de Nayarit	Radio UAN	University
XHPNA-FM	101.9 FM	Tepic	XEPNA-AM, S.A. de C.V.	Romántica 101.9	Romantic
XHCCBK-FM	103.3 FM	Tepic	GA Radiocomunicaciones, S.A. de C.V.	El Heraldo Radio	News/talk
XHTEN-FM	104.1 FM	Tepic	Ayuntamiento Constitucional del Municipio de Tepic	Radio Tepic	Public radio
XHERK-FM	104.9 FM	Tepic	Radio Korita de Nayarit, S.A. de C.V.	Los 40	Contemporary hit radio
XHNAY-FM	105.1 FM	Bucerías	XENAY, AM, S.A. de C.V.	Oreja FM	Adult hits
XHXT-FM	105.7 FM	Tecomán	Amplitudes y Frecuencias de Occidente, S.A. de C.V.	La Caliente	Regional Mexican
XHERIO-FM	106.9 FM	Ixtlán del Río	XERIO-AM, S.A. de C.V.	Radio Sensación	Regional Mexican

== Defunct stations ==
- XEPVI-AM 1280, Xalisco
