= XHTEY-FM =

Radio station in Tepic, Nayarit, Mexico

XHTEY-FM / XETEY-AM
- Tepic, Nayarit; Mexico
- Frequencies: 93.7 MHz; 840 kHz
- Branding: La Más Picuda

Programming
- Format: Regional Mexican

Ownership
- Owner: Grupo Radiorama; (XETEY-AM, S.A. de C.V.)
- Sister stations: XHPY-FM, XHEOO-FM, XHNF-FM, XHEPIC-FM, XHPNA-FM, XHZE-FM, XHERIO-FM

History
- First air date: July 18, 1990 (concession); 1994 (FM)
- Call sign meaning: From "Tepic, Nayarit"

Technical information
- Licensing authority: CRT
- Class: B1 (FM); C (AM)
- Power: 1 kW day/.25 kW night
- ERP: 10 kW
- HAAT: 226.4 m (743 ft)

Links
- Webcast: Listen live
- Website: lamaspicuda.com

XHTEY-FM/XETEY-AM is a combo radio station on 93.7 FM and 840 AM in Tepic, Nayarit. It is owned by Grupo Radiorama and carries a Regional Mexican format known as La Más Picuda.

== History ==
Logo as "Sensación" in the early 2010s

XETEY received its first concession on July 18, 1990. It added its FM station in 1994.

It was originally known as Radio Sensación before becoming Fiesta Mexicana and later becoming La Más Picuda.
