= KJLY =

Christian radio station in Blue Earth, Minnesota

Coordinates: 43.911°N 94.053°W

- Blue Earth, Minnesota; United States
- Frequency: 104.5 MHz
- Branding: Kinship Christian Radio

Programming
- Format: Christian radio

Ownership
- Owner: Minn-Iowa Christian Broadcasting
- Sister stations: KJCY, KJGT, KJIA, KJTS, KJTT, KJYL

History
- First air date: November 1983
- Call sign meaning: Know Jesus Loves You

Technical information
- Licensing authority: FCC
- Class: C2
- ERP: 50,000 watts
- HAAT: 150 m (492 ft)
- Translators: 101.9 K270BQ (Northwood, IA); 104.9 K285FX (New Ulm)

Links
- Public license information: Public file; LMS
- Webcast: Listen live
- Website: https://kinshipradio.org/home/

KJLY (104.5 FM) is a radio station located in Blue Earth, Minnesota. The station airs a Christian-based religious format.

KJLY also uses a number of low-powered translators throughout the southern Minnesota and northern Iowa regions, in towns such as Mankato, New Ulm, Austin, Sleepy Eye, Owatonna and St. Peter in Minnesota and Mason City, Iowa,
