= WMMA =

WMMA may refer to:

- WMMA (AM), a radio station (1480 AM) licensed to serve Irondale, Alabama, United States
- WMMA-FM, a radio station (93.9 FM) licensed to Nekoosa, Wisconsin, United States
