= WCLR =

WCLR may refer to:

- WCLR (FM), a radio station (92.5 FM) licensed to serve DeKalb, Illinois, United States
- WKLV-FM, a radio station (93.5 FM) licensed to serve Butler, Alabama, United States, which held the call sign WCLR from 2017 to 2018
- WCLR (Arlington Heights, Illinois), a radio station (88.3 FM) licensed to serve Arlington Heights, Illinois, United States, which broadcast from 2001 to 2017
- The former call sign of WHIO-FM (95.7), held from 1989 to 2000
- The former call sign of WTMX (101.9 FM), held from 1970 to 1989
- The former call sign of WAIT (AM) (850 AM), held from 1965 to 1969
- Waccamaw Coast Line Railroad
