= KBKO =

KBKO may refer to:

- KBKO (FM), a radio station (88.3 FM) licensed to serve Kodiak, Alaska, United States
- KOSJ, a radio station (1490 AM) licensed to Santa Barbara, California, United States, which held the call sign KBKO from 1997 to 2008
