= XHEPIC-FM =

Radio station in Tepic, Nayarit, Mexico

- Tepic, Nayarit; Mexico
- Frequency: 98.5 FM
- Branding: @FM (Arroba FM)

Programming
- Format: Pop

Ownership
- Owner: Grupo Radiorama; (XEPIC-AM, S.A. de C.V.)
- Sister stations: XHTEY-FM, XHNF-FM, XHPY-FM, XHPNA-FM

History
- First air date: November 25, 1996 (concession); 2011 (FM)
- Call sign meaning: TEPIC

Technical information
- Licensing authority: CRT
- Class: B1
- ERP: 3 kW
- HAAT: 264 m (866 ft)
- Transmitter coordinates: 21°31′51″N 104°54′55″W

Links
- Webcast: Listen live
- Website: radioramanayarit.mx

XHEPIC-FM is a radio station on 98.5 FM in Tepic, Nayarit, Mexico. XHEPIC is owned by Grupo Radiorama and carries its @FM pop format.

== History ==
XHEPIC began as XEPIC-AM 1380, made available in 1976 and finally awarded to Radiorama subsidiary Anahuac Radio, S.A., in 1996.

On August 12, 2019, Éxtasis Digital moved to sister station XHEOO-FM 96.1 and Arroba FM moved to XHEPIC 98.5.
