= WQOH =

WQOH may refer to:

- WQOH-FM, a radio station (88.7 FM) licensed to serve Springville, Alabama, United States
- WMMA (AM), a radio station (1480 AM) licensed to serve Irondale, Alabama, which held the call sign WQOH from 2008 to 2016
