= XHTEJ-FM =

Radio station in Tejupilco de Hidalgo, State of Mexico

Tejupilco de Hidalgo, State of Mexico; Mexico
- Frequency: 88.3 FM
- Branding: Radio Roca

Ownership
- Owner: Roberto Rodríguez Gómez

History
- First air date: October 8, 2012 (permit)
- Call sign meaning: TEJupilco

Technical information
- Class: B1
- ERP: 1,000 watts
- HAAT: 314.86 meters
- Transmitter coordinates: 18°56′11.4″N 100°06′58″W

Links
- Website: facebook.com/radiorocatejupilco

XHTEJ-FM is a noncommercial radio station in Tejupilco de Hidalgo, State of Mexico. Broadcasting on 88.3 FM, XHTEJ is owned by Roberto Rodríguez Gómez and is known as Radio Roca.

== History ==
XHTEJ received its permit on October 8, 2012.
