= XHPY-FM =

Radio station in Tepic, Nayarit, Mexico

- Tepic, Nayarit; Mexico
- Frequency: 95.3 FM
- Branding: Stereo Vida

Programming
- Format: Pop/romantic

Ownership
- Owner: Grupo Radiorama; (XHPY-FM, S.A. de C.V.)
- Sister stations: XHTEY-FM, XHNF-FM, XHEPIC-FM, XHPNA-FM

History
- First air date: November 28, 1988 (concession)

Technical information
- Licensing authority: CRT
- Class: B
- ERP: 13.41 kW
- HAAT: 183.58 m (602.3 ft)

Links
- Website: radioramanayarit.mx

XHPY-FM is a radio station on 95.3 FM in Tepic, Nayarit, Mexico. XHPY is owned by Radiorama and carries a pop/romantic format known as Stereo Vida.

== History ==
XHPY received its concession on November 28, 1988.
