= KKAG =

KKAG may refer to:

- KKAG (FM), a radio station (88.3 FM) licensed to serve Grangeville, Idaho, United States
- KNFL (AM), a radio station (740 AM) licensed to serve Fargo, North Dakota, United States, which held the call sign KKAG from 2006 to 2007
