= KOUI =

KOUI may refer to:

- KOUI (FM), a radio station (88.3 FM) licensed to serve Mount Pleasant, Texas, United States
- WLYY (FM), a radio station (90.7 FM) licensed to serve Louisville, Mississippi, United States, which held the call sign KOUI from 2009 to 2023
