= Tejupilco de Hidalgo =

Tejupilco
- Location within Mexico Location within State of Mexico
- Coordinates: 18°54′21″N 100°09′10″W
- Country: Mexico
- State: Mexico State
- Settled: 955
- Municipal status: 1825

Government
  - Municipal President: Anthony Domignuez Vargas (2018-)
- Elevation: 1,330 m (4,360 ft)

Population (2010)Municipality
  - Total: 71,077
  - Seat: 25,631
- Time zone: UTC-6 (Central (US Central))
- Postal code: 51400
- Website: (in Spanish) https://www.tejupilco.gob.mx/

Tejupilco de Hidalgo is the seat of Tejupilco Municipality in the State of Mexico, Mexico. It is located approximately 100 kilometres (62 mi) southwest of the state capital Toluca, along Federal Highway 34. The name Tejupilco comes from Náhuatl meaning "between the toes". "De Hidalgo" was added to honor Father Miguel Hidalgo who initiated the Mexican War of Independence.

While the origins of the original settlers of the area have been forgotten, there are remains of many of their ceremonial centers and tombs atop various hills. The most important of these sites are in Ocotepec, Acatitlán, Acamuchitlán, Bejucos, San Simón, Tejupilco, Nanchititla, Hipericones and San Miguel Ixtapan. However, it is known that the area had been occupied for centuries by the Otomi who named the area "Talisca". Most Otomi were driven out by a people called the "Tecos" who were under the dominion of the Purépecha. Father Plancarte says in Book I of the Annals of the Museum of Michoacan that the Tecos were a group related to the Mexicas who lived in the Purépecha kingdom. In 1052, the Toltecs arrived as refugees after the destruction of their kingdom, as well as the Matlatzinca who came later from the Toluca Valley. By 1476 the Aztec king Axayácatl conquered the Matlatzincas and took control of their lands including what is now Tejupilco. After the Spanish Conquest, Andrés de Tapia was assigned to subdue the old Matlatzinca lands where he met no resistance in this area.

== The town ==
The current town of Tejupilco was a village by 1579 which was paying tribute to the Spaniards as late as 1676, inhabited by Matlatzincas and Chontales. In 1734, it was still an overwhelmingly indigenous community with only seven Spanish families recorded there. For most of its pre-municipal history, the town was governed by indigenous leaders subject to Spanish control. In 1874, the town was named head of the district of Tejupilco de Hidalgo, which included the current municipalities of Temascaltepec, Amatepec, and Tlatlaya, but in 1881 the seat was transferred to Temascaltepec.

The current population of the town is 22,041.

=== Economy ===
Agriculture is the most important economic activity here, using 93,586 hectares (231,260 acres), growing corn, beans, avocados and peaches. Livestock raising includes pigs, goats, sheep and domestic fowl. There is also some logging.

Mining is an important alternative activity as there are mineral and non-mineral deposits here, such as the marble deposit in the community of El Zapote. However, none have seriously been commercially exploited yet. Tourism is another possibility that needs to be explored.

== See also ==
- San Miguel Ixtapan (archaeological site)
