= XHDCP-FM =

Radio station in Ario de Rosales, Michoacán

Ario de Rosales, Michoacán; Mexico
- Frequency: 88.3 MHz
- Branding: Expresión Radio

Programming
- Format: Noncommercial community radio

Ownership
- Owner: De Corazón Purépecha, A.C.

History
- First air date: November 14, 2016 (social community concession)
- Call sign meaning: De Corazón Purépecha, A.C. (concessionaire)

Technical information
- Class: AA
- ERP: 6 kW
- HAAT: 116.11 m
- Transmitter coordinates: 19°12′58.7″N 101°42′30.3″W

Links
- Webcast: Listen live
- Website: expresionradioario.com

XHDCP-FM is a community radio station in Ario de Rosales, Michoacán, Mexico, broadcasting on 88.3 FM. XHDCP is owned by De Corazón Purépecha, A.C.

== History ==
XHDCP received its social community concession on November 14, 2016.
