= XHSJI-FM =

Radio station in San José Iturbide, Guanajuato

- San José Iturbide, Guanajuato; Mexico
- Frequency: 88.3 FM (HD Radio)
- Branding: Radio Lobo

Programming
- Format: Regional Mexican

Ownership
- Owner: Corporación Bajío Comunicaciones; (José Guadalupe Bernal Vázquez)
- Sister stations: XHY-FM, XHCEL-FM, XESAG-AM, XHQRO-FM

History
- First air date: 2019
- Former call signs: XHPJIT-FM (2017–2018, not used on air)
- Call sign meaning: San José Iturbide

Technical information
- Class: A
- ERP: 3 kW
- HAAT: -1.5 m
- Transmitter coordinates: 21°03′02.4″N 100°26′51.5″W

Links
- Webcast: Listen live
- Website: radiolobobajio.mx

XHSJI-FM is a radio station on 88.3 FM in San José Iturbide, Guanajuato. It is owned by Corporación Bajío Comunicaciones and carries a Regional Mexican format known as Radio Lobo. The station broadcasts from a tower on Cerrito Galomo near San José Iturbide.

== History ==
XHSJI was awarded in the IFT-4 radio auction of 2017 as XHPJIT-FM; the call letters were changed in 2018 before signing on. The station signed on in 2019.
