= KRAF =

Radio station in Fort Stockton, Texas

Coordinates: 30°52′38.58″N 102°52′2.11″W

- Fort Stockton, Texas; United States
- Frequency: 88.3 MHz
- Branding: Radio Agape

Programming
- Format: Spanish Christian

Ownership
- Owner: Christian Television Radio Ministry

History
- First air date: 2009
- Call sign meaning: Radio Agape Fort Stockton

Technical information
- Licensing authority: FCC
- Class: A
- Power: 300 watts

Links
- Public license information: Public file; LMS

KRAF is a radio station at 88.3 FM in Fort Stockton, Texas, United States. It is owned by Christian Television Radio Ministry and carries a Spanish Christian format known as Radio Agape.
