= XHPVAT-FM =

Radio station in Maravatío, Michoacán

- Maravatío, Michoacán; Mexico
- Frequency: 88.3 FM
- Branding: Sensitiva 88.3

Programming
- Format: Regional Mexican

Ownership
- Owner: Grupo LCL Comunicaciones; (Mr Pool Music, S.A. de C.V.)

History
- First air date: July 1, 2017
- Call sign meaning: MaraVATío

Technical information
- Class: A
- ERP: 3 kW
- HAAT: -135 m

Links
- Webcast: Listen live
- Website: sensitivaradio.com

XHPVAT-FM is a radio station on 88.3 FM in Maravatío, Michoacán. It is known as Sensitiva 88.3 and carries a Regional Mexican format.

== History ==
XHPVAT was awarded in the IFT-4 radio auction of 2017 and was the only station won by a consortium, consisting of Leopoldo González Cruz, Cristopher González Cruz, and Leopoldo Neftalí González Cruz. The consortium was formed as a company, Mr Pool Music, prior to the formal awarding of the station's concession on June 27, 2017.

Sensitiva was the first new station to go on as a result of IFT-4.
