= KAXL =

- Greenacres, California; United States
- Broadcast area: Bakersfield metropolitan area
- Frequency: 88.3 MHz
- Branding: 88.3 Life FM

Programming
- Format: Adult contemporary Christian
- Affiliations: AP Radio

Ownership
- Owner: Skyride Unlimited, Incorporated

History
- First air date: May 4, 1994

Technical information
- Licensing authority: FCC
- Facility ID: 60582
- Class: B1
- ERP: 21,000 watts
- HAAT: 100 meters (330 ft)
- Transmitter coordinates: 35°24′55″N 119°14′1″W

Links
- Public license information: Public file; LMS
- Website: 883.LifeFM.com

KAXL (88.3 FM, "Life FM") is a non-commercial radio station licensed to Greenacres, California, United States, and serving the Bakersfield metropolitan area. Owned by Skyride Unlimited, Inc., KAXL carries an adult contemporary Christian format. The studios are located on Rosedale Highway in Bakersfield.

The transmitter is on Superior Road at Sullivan Road in Rosedale.

== History ==
The station signed on the air on May 4, 1994. It has always had a Christian radio format. Before it went on the air, Skyride Unlimited bought the construction permit for $4,000 in 1991. Skyride supervised the building of the studios and transmitter.

== DJs ==
- Matt Pelishek — Afternoon Joy Ride co-host and Program Director (Joined 2007 as afternoon host).
- Aaron Perlman — Afternoon Joy Ride co-host (Joined 2014).
- Jon Engen — Morning show host (longtime; involved in various capacities for 26 years)
- James Stuart - Evenings
- Mysti Jordan - Middays

== Past DJs ==
- Dan Schaffer
- Sheryl Giesbrecht Turner
