= WCLR (Arlington Heights, Illinois) =

Radio station in Arlington Heights, Illinois (2003–2017)

Arlington Heights, Illinois; United States
- Frequency: 88.3 MHz (shared with WHCM)

Programming
- Format: Defunct (was contemporary Christian)
- Network: Air1

Ownership
- Owner: Educational Media Foundation

History
- First air date: 2003
- Last air date: June 28, 2017
- Call sign meaning: Christian Liberty Radio (refers to original permittee)

Technical information
- Facility ID: 11186
- Class: A
- ERP: 1,000 watts
- HAAT: 18.1 meters (59 ft)
- Transmitter coordinates: 42°6′45″N 87°58′58″W

WCLR was a radio station that broadcast on 88.3 FM in Arlington Heights, Illinois. It was owned by the Educational Media Foundation and broadcast its Air1 Contemporary Christian network. Throughout its existence, WCLR shared the 88.3 frequency with Palatine-based WHCM at William Rainey Harper College, broadcasting on weekends and when the college was not in session. Pursuant to an agreement with the college, the WCLR license was canceled in 2017 to allow WHCM to broadcast full-time on 88.3.

== History ==
On April 14, 1993, the Church of Christian Liberty filed an application for a construction permit for a new FM radio station on 88.3 FM. The application was granted November 6, 2000, and the WCLR call letters were assigned in 2001. (The call letters were historic in Chicago radio at 850 AM and 101.9 FM, but had been used in Ohio throughout the 1990s.) The time-share agreement would put WCLR on the air on Fridays, Saturdays, and Sundays and during Harper College breaks from December 16 to January 15, March 25–31, and May 21 to August 14.

In 2002, pastor Paul D. Lindstrom, who founded CCL, died. While Lindstrom had envisioned WCLR as an extension of the church and its affiliated Christian Liberty Academy, the church opted to sell the permit to an experienced Christian radio operator. On June 17, 2003, the Church of Christian Liberty assigned the construction permit to the Educational Media Foundation for $25,000. EMF applied for program test authority in November 2003 and was granted it in April 2004. It joined EMF's Christian rock network Air1.

On May 17, 2017, EMF and Harper College reached an agreement in 2017 by which EMF would surrender the license for WCLR to allow WHCM to go full-time on 88.3 MHz. Harper College paid $13,600, representing EMF's outstanding obligation on the WCLR tower lease, and up to $5,000 in EMF's legal fees. The call letters on the WCLR license were changed to WHCD in advance of the closure, with the WCLR call letters being placed on the K-Love transmitter in Butler, Alabama, before returning to Illinois on EMF's 92.5 DeKalb. WHCM went full-time on June 29, 2017.
