= WXUT =

- Toledo, Ohio; United States
- Broadcast area: Greater Toledo Area
- Frequency: 88.3 MHz

Programming
- Format: Alternative

Ownership
- Owner: University of Toledo
- Sister stations: WXTS

History
- Former call signs: WERC

Technical information
- Licensing authority: FCC
- Facility ID: 69200
- Class: A
- ERP: 100 watts
- HAAT: 58.0 meters
- Transmitter coordinates: 41°39′26″N 83°36′57″W

Links
- Public license information: Public file; LMS
- Webcast: Listen live
- Website: Official website

WXUT (88.3 FM) is a radio station broadcasting an alternative rock format. Licensed to Toledo, Ohio, the station serves the University of Toledo campus. WXUT shares the 88.3 frequency with WXTS-FM, which broadcasts when WXUT is off the air. The station is currently owned by the University of Toledo. In 1969, the "TU" radio station went by the call letters of WERC on an AM frequency of 680KHz (later 600Khz). In 1975 WERC was carried on Buckeye cablevision's Cable FM audio service on 90.1 CAFM and later 106.1 CAFM prior to moving to FM in 1988 and sharing the TPS frequency of 88.3 MHz.
