= WNUB-FM =

Radio station at Norwich University in Northfield, Vermont

- Northfield, Vermont; United States
- Broadcast area: Norwich University
- Frequency: 88.3 MHz
- Branding: WNUB, Dog River Radio

Programming
- Format: College

Ownership
- Owner: Trustees of Norwich University

History
- First air date: December 8, 1967
- Call sign meaning: "Norwich University Broadcasting"

Technical information
- Licensing authority: FCC
- Facility ID: 66513
- Class: A
- ERP: 270 watts
- HAAT: −113 meters (−371 ft)
- Transmitter coordinates: 44°08′24″N 72°39′36″W

Links
- Public license information: Public file; LMS
- Website: www.norwich.edu/wnub

WNUB-FM (88.3 FM) is a radio station licensed to serve Northfield, Vermont. It is the radio station of Norwich University, airing a college radio format from studios and transmitter on the university campus.

== History ==
On February 28, 1967, Norwich applied for a new noncommercial educational radio station on 89.1 FM to broadcast from the university campus. The transmitter and studios would be located in Jackman Hall, the school's then-new administration building. WNUB-FM began at the suggestion of Cadet Victor P. Waryas, a senior at the university, and was put on the air with engineering assistance from WDEV in Waterbury. Another driving force behind the station was George Turner, who also doubled as Norwich's public relations director and sports information director.

WNUB-FM made it to air on December 8, 1967; while the university financed the more than $10,000 in startup expenses, students did much of the work in building the station, led by chief engineer David Bonney. It was the first FM station to broadcast in central Vermont; in fact, it was the third in the state and the first outside of Burlington, where WJOY-FM (1962) and WRUV-FM (1965) were already in operation. (WRUV was also the only other noncommercial radio station in the state at the time.) Programming on the new station included news and public affairs programming as well as light classical music.

Norwich was an all-male school at the time WNUB-FM began broadcasting. The first woman to work as a DJ on the station was Stephanie Donat, a senior at the Vermont College; she hosted an hourlong folk music show at WNUB-FM, whose signal was not receivable on Vermont College's campus, in 1968. In 1971, the station staged a 126-hour radiothon to benefit the Big Brothers, Big Sisters program run by Norwich and Vermont College; one day during the event, even WNUB-FM staff were stunned when Governor Deane C. Davis called in, commending the cadets' work and making a contribution.

In 1981, WNUB-FM filed to move from 88.3 to 93.9 FM, with a slight power boost from 10 to 18 watts; the school had previously pursued a change to 89.5 FM in 1975 but abandoned it after six months. Until the station became a part of the school's communications department in the 1980s, it was student run, operating irregular hours and only during the academic year. WNUB-FM ramped up to its present 285 watts of power when it moved to 88.3 MHz in 1988; it also began broadcasting in stereo for the first time as part of the upgrade. The transmitter and antenna were most recently replaced in 2003 and 2005, respectively.

Low enrollment prompted the CM 351 radio class to be canceled for the first time in 15 years in 2014; this meant that there were no student programs for the entire spring 2014 semester over WNUB-FM, and the only live shows were being broadcast by two community volunteers on Saturday mornings. However, 2014 also saw the station stream online for the first time. WNUB-FM was able to rebound from the cancellation, and it also began adding additional community programming; Northfield Town Meeting coverage and three days of music from the Northfield Labor Day festival, the largest in Vermont, are now heard over WNUB-FM.

== Programming ==
Most programs on WNUB are hosted by students in the CM 351 radio class. In addition to hosting live two-hour evening shows, students enrolled in the class also do voice-tracking; record promos and commercials; and complete class projects.
