= XHPCTN-FM =

Radio station in Compostela, Nayarit, Mexico

- Compostela-Tepic, Nayarit; Mexico
- Broadcast area: Tepic
- Frequency: 88.3 FM
- Branding: La Lupe

Programming
- Format: Variety hits

Ownership
- Owner: Multimedios Radio; (Radio Informativa, S.A. de C.V.)
- Sister stations: XHXT-FM Tepic

History
- First air date: June 7, 2018
- Call sign meaning: ComposTela Nayarit

Technical information
- Licensing authority: CRT
- Class: AA
- ERP: 500 watts
- HAAT: 747.8 m (2,453 ft)
- Transmitter coordinates: 21°26′51.1″N 104°57′31.3″W

Links
- Webcast: Listen live
- Website: mmradio.com

XHPCTN-FM is a radio station on 88.3 FM in Compostela, Nayarit, Mexico. It is owned by Multimedios Radio and carries its La Lupe variety hits format.

== History ==
XHPCTN was awarded in the IFT-4 radio auction of 2017 and came to air on June 7, 2018 with Multimedios's Hits pop format. It is the first radio station licensed to Compostela, though the primary market served is the state capital of Tepic.

In late August 2018, XHPCTN flipped to the La Lupe variety hits format.
