= WDCV-FM =

- Carlisle, Pennsylvania; United States
- Frequency: 88.3 MHz
- Branding: The Voice

Programming
- Format: Variety

Ownership
- Owner: Trustees of Dickinson College

History
- First air date: December 10th 1962
- Call sign meaning: The Dickinson College Voice

Technical information
- Licensing authority: FCC
- Facility ID: 68238
- Class: A
- ERP: 450 watts
- HAAT: -13.0 meters
- Transmitter coordinates: 40°12′9.00″N 77°11′46.00″W

Links
- Public license information: Public file; LMS
- Webcast: listen live
- Website: WDCV-FM

WDCV-FM (88.3 FM) is a radio station broadcasting a variety format. Licensed to Dickinson College in Carlisle, Pennsylvania, United States, the station serves the Pennsylvania college area.

The station started in 1959 as an AM operation at 640 kHz, with broadcasts confined to the Dickinson campus. WDCV expanded to a 10-watt FM service in 1973, and began broadcasting 18 hours a day at 88.3 MHz. The station increased its transmitter power to 250 watts in 1982 and began stereo broadcasting in 1989. More recently, WDCV began webcasting at www.wdcvfm.com, and streaming over on mobile devices via Stretch Internet.

As an educational, non-profit station, WDCV-FM is operated on a volunteer basis by undergraduate students at Dickinson College and members of the Carlisle community. The principal purpose of WDCV-FM is to provide a forum for overlooked, suppressed, or under-represented voices and music. WDCV broadcasts cultural, educational, informational, and other programs and materials for the entertainment and profit of the public, and for the education and training of its staff. WDCV is Carlisle's only non-profit radio station.

With its transmitter and antenna atop Bosler Hall on the Dickinson College campus, the station reaches the entire Carlisle community, as well as Mt. Holly Springs, Boiling Springs, Middlesex, and New Kingstown. A worldwide audience is served by the WDCV web stream.

WDCV aired its first broadcast on December 10, 1962. In 2012, the station celebrated its 50th anniversary. Ten years later, it celebrated its 60th anniversary. An archive of the eventful history of images, articles, and memorabilia is located on a Tumblr blog.

WDCV-FM has a variety of shows, many of which are hosted by Dickinson students.

== See also ==
- List of college radio stations in the United States
