= San Miguel Ixtapan (archaeological site) =

Archaeological site in Tejupilco, Mexico

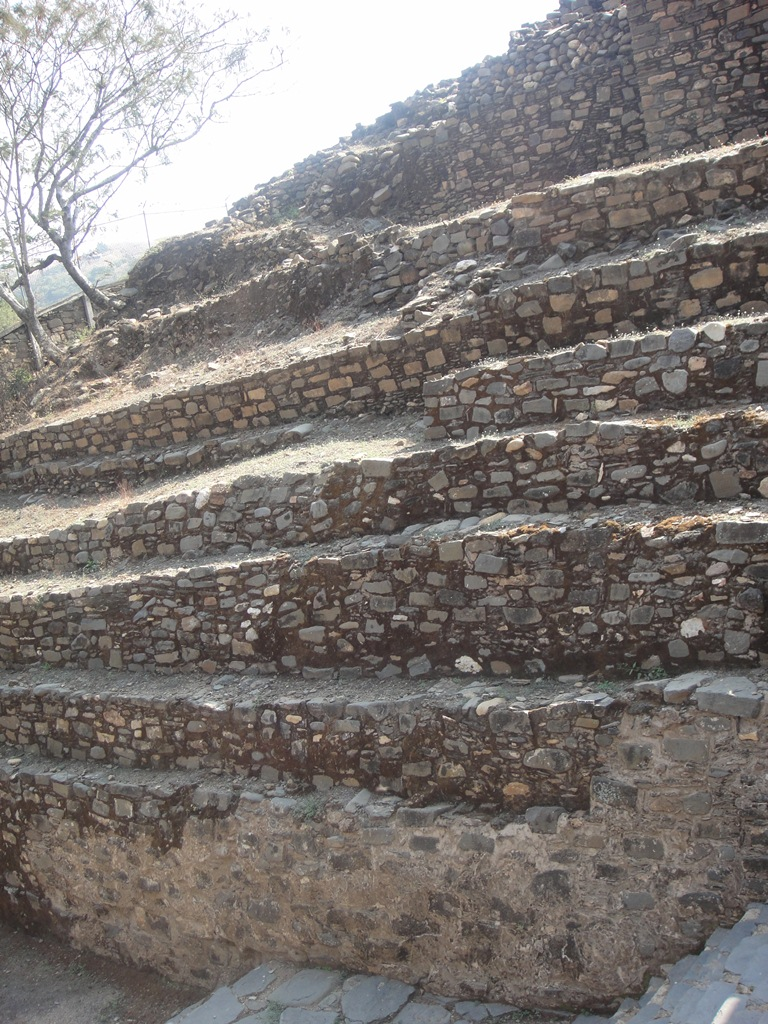
- San Miguel Ixtapan, Basement 3
- Interactive map of San Miguel Ixtapan
- 18°48′27″N 100°09′19″W
- Periods: Mesoamerican Classical, Postclassical
- Cultures: Otomí – Toltec – Aztec ( Otomí – Nahuatl languages)
- Location: San Miguel Ixtapan, Tejupilco (municipality), State of Mexico; Mexico

History
- Built: 500 CE
- Abandoned: 1500 CE

Site notes
- Website: http://www.gobiernodigital.inah.gob.mx/ZonasArqueologicas/todas/htme/za00917.html

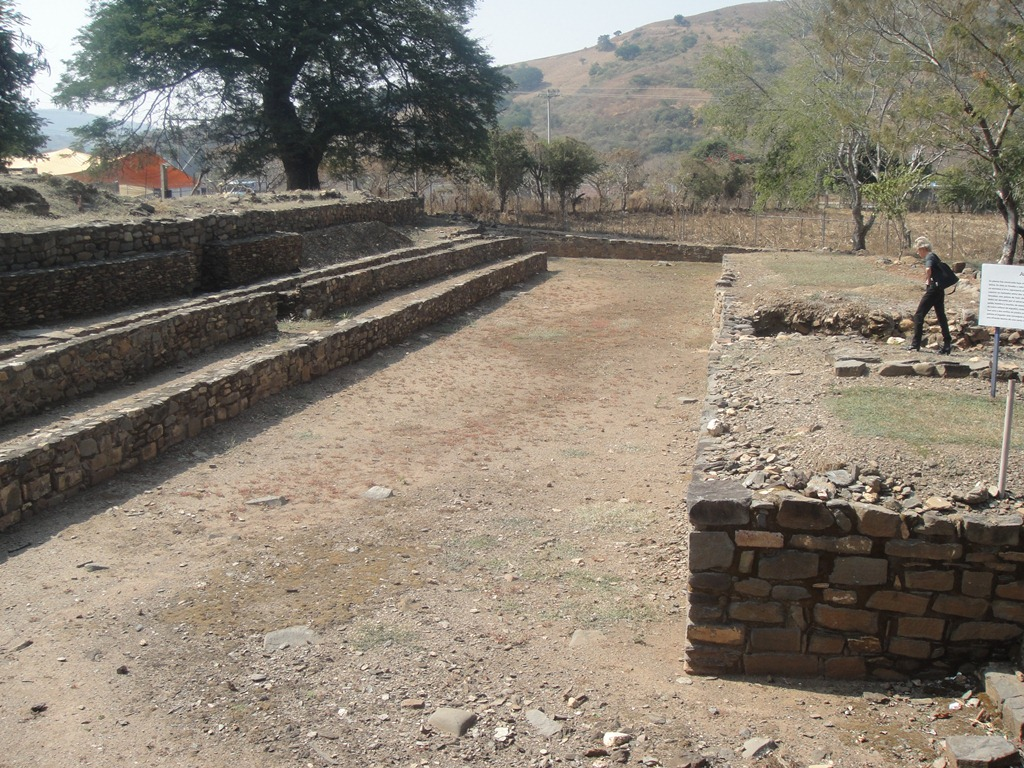
San Miguel Ixtapan, ballgame court

San Miguel Ixtapan is an archaeological site located in the municipality of Tejupilco (Nahuatl "Texopilco" or "Texopilli"), in the State of Mexico.

Tejupilco is about 100 kilometers west from the city of Toluca, Mexico State, on federal highway 134. The site is some 15 kilometers south of the municipal head, on state highway 8 that leads to Amatepec.

This site is one of the few explored in the southwest region of the State of Mexico, that has provided some archaeological information on an area that virtually` was not explored.

Its apogee was in the aftermath of the Teotihuacan decline. Located in an area which probably served as a liaison between the Central Highlands and regions of Michoacán and Guerrero, San Miguel Ixtapan had its greatest growth between 750 and 900 CE. Then the site reaches a substantial expansion and built most of the structures of the ceremonial area now visible, they represent only a portion of what was the site in its splendor. San Miguel Ixtapan was located in a privileged place with deposits of basalt prisms used for construction, fertile land and one of the larger flow springs in the State.

== Background ==
The earliest evidence of human habitation in the area is a quartz scraper and obsidian blade found in the Tlapacoya area, which was an island in the former Lake Chalco. They are dated to the Pleistocene era which dates human habitation back to 20,000 years. These first peoples were hunter-gatherers. Stone Age implements have been found all over the territory from mammoth bones, to stone tools to human remains. Most have been found in the areas of Los Reyes Acozac, Tizayuca, Tepexpan, San Francisco Mazapa, El Risco and Tequixquiac. Between 20,000 and 5000 BCE, the people here eventually went from hunting and gathering to sedimentary villages with farming and domesticated animals. The main crop was corn, and stone tools for the grinding of this grain become common. Later crops include beans, chili peppers and squash grown near established villages. Evidence of ceramics appears around 2500 BCE with the earliest artifacts of these appearing in Tlapacoya, Atoto, Malinalco, Acatzingo and Tlatilco.

The earliest major city of the state is Teotihuacan, built between 100 BCE and 100 CE.

Between 800 and 900 CE, the Matlatzincas established their dominion with Teotenango as capital.

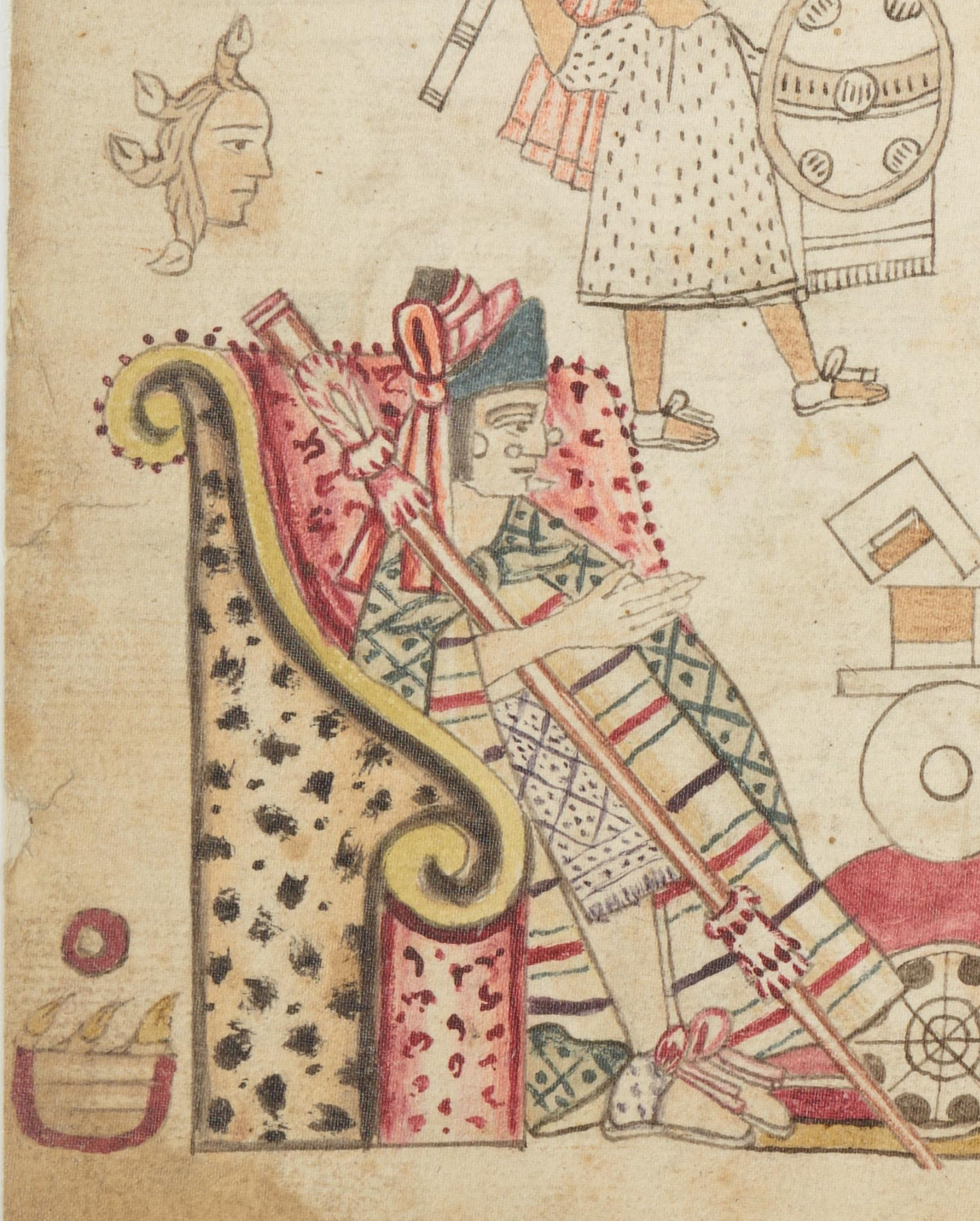
Axayacatl Tlatoani of Tenochtitlan as depicted in the Codex Azcatitlan

During Axayacatl reign (1469–1481) the Aztecs and Purépecha conquered much of the Matlazincas settlements, imposing names such as: Metepec, Capulhuac Quauhpanoayan, Xochiaca Tzinacantepec, Zoquitzinco, Toluca, Xiquipilco, Tenantzinco, Teotenango and Calixtlahuaca.

Other dominions during the prehispanic period include that of the Chichimecas in Tenayuca and of the Acolhuas in Huexotla, Texcotizingo and Los Melones. Other important groups were the Mazahuas in the Atlacomulco area. Their center was at Mazahuacán, next to Jocotitlán mountain. The Otomis were centered in Jilotepec.

=== Toponymy ===
The name of the place is composed from the words "Iztatl" (salt) and "pan" (place): "place where is salt", this makes reference to the importance that salt exploitation had from prehispanic times, it was fundamentally due to the saltpeter (Potassium nitrate) water wells that existed near the town. (Still mined, although in smaller scale)

In relation to Tejupilco, there is no certainty of the true meaning of the word Tejupilco until today, it is known that a large volcanic rock which has a human footprint in the Huarache Hill east of San Simón, gave name to the place.

Texopilco, as it was known to the arrival of the Spaniards and several decades afterwards, has had several versions of its meaning: Texo (foot print), pilli (small), place of small footprint, Te (not own), xopilli (toes). Place of strange footprints, or Tetl (stone), xo (foot), pilli (son or prince) Place of important people footprints.

Interpretations have changed through the centuries, according to knowledge, feelings, views and opinions of the authors.

=== Investigations ===
Initial explorations of this site occurred in 1985, it focused on the model found. The site was discovered by farmers plowing the land, when rocks and other vestiges were detected.

It is difficult to determine the site constructors, although filiation from ethno historical sources indicates they were closely related to the Otomi culture.

The first report of the site was given in 1958, upon discovering the so-called "model", a basaltic stone where the city was carved in miniature. The stone is now under roof, under a shelter next to the Museum. It was initially thought that it was a representation of the archaeological site; however, subsequent excavations demonstrated that it is not the case and so far not found a site that matches its design; now it is considered an ideal representation of a city or a sculpted ceremonial center sculpted, taking advantage of the rock morphology.

=== Occupations ===
As a result of site field investigations, at least four occupation stages were detected.

- First Occupation. Corresponds to the last years of the Classical period (500 to 750 CE), it includes remains of a housing residential structure where Teotihuacan III and IV type figurines were discovered.
- Second occupation. Is chronologically placed during the epiclassical period (750 to 900 CE), considered the apogee of the site, when the main structures of the place are constructed.
- Third occupation. It is placed during the early postclassical (900 to 1200 CE), the main monuments are reused, with several architectonic modifications, additions and extensions.
- Fourth Occupation. After 1200 CE, the site is abandoned for some time, until the time when the site is partially reoccupied by a cultural group part of the Mexica or Aztec culture; they built simple houses over the remains of older structures and remained on the site until the time Spanish invasion. One of the possible reasons why the Aztecs arrived to the area is that it is located on a strategic location, for trade control of goods from Tierra Caliente towards the central Highlands and vice versa. In addition to the saltpeter wells, previously mentioned, a product highly appreciated in prehispanic times.

=== Tejupilco chronology ===
Documented periods of regional occupation.

==== 12000 BCE ====
The oldest evidence of human occupation of these lands dates back to more than 12 thousand years, approximate date when Tejupilco cave paintings were. Early hunter-gatherers who arrived in the region at the end of the third glaciation evolved to become sedentary groups of farmers, complex societies and cultures which formed part of other civilizations.

The plentiful natural resources, consequence of the rugged geography formed from millions of years ago, attracted to the Tejupilco region early settlers at least 10 thousand years ago, date in which hunter-gatherer groups created the cave paintings at the "Cueva de los Monitos"; located north of "Bejucos" at the foot of the Nanchititla Sierra. The hunter-gatherer groups have evolved to sedentary tribes through peaceful or violent exchanges with other cultures, to the domain of agriculture and domestication of animals, basic astronomical, medical and scientific knowledge.

These settlements scattered throughout the region evolved, some to become complex cultures with language and religion, stratified societies and priestly classes. Others collapsed and were forgotten until the recent discovery of its ruins and study of remains that repositioned them as key parts for the study and understanding of regional history.

==== 2000 BCE ====
The most remote archaeological discovery is located in the archaeological area of San Miguel Ixtapan, atop of a pyramid basement, still unexplored; a mask and jade necklace were found alongside organic remains. These artifacts belong to an unknown culture that flourished in San Miguel Ixtapan, but over two thousand years before the site recorded history.

Sites such as "Río Grande" and the "Pararrayos de San Miguel", evidenced the collapse of the settlement from hundreds or thousands of years before the conquest of Mexico. In San Miguel Ixtapan a human body was discovered, while digging to install a lightning rod, along with prepared foods, on top of a pyramid-like basement. The body provided a chronological placement to 2000 years BCE, which means that a culture existed about 4 thousand years ago, which probably collapsed due to an invasion, next to the body finding, a necklace and green stone mask were found, these are exhibited in the San Miguel Ixtapan site Museum. In the same site are located the San Miguel Ixtapan ruins, a much later culture.

==== 450 CE ====
San Miguel Ixtapan, only archaeological site moderately excavated and studied, of the more than 180 sites existing in the region. The San Miguel Ixtapan culture flourished from 450 to 1522 CE, possibly the Chontal culture from the Balsas with close cultural and commercial ties with Teotihuacan, Tula, and the Central Highlands as well as other points of Tierra Caliente.

The complex cultural overlay present in Mesoamerica throughout centuries, also existed in Tejupilco, where eventually a Chontal Kingdom was formed (Chontal meaning foreigner or not Aztec) probably Matlazinca with Tejupilco as capital and composed, according to Gaspar de Covarrubias by 18 groups

==== 1475 CE ====
The Aztecs conquered the Tejupilco kingdom.

Tejupilco was conquered by the Mexicas or Aztecs around 1475–1476, during the reign of Axayacatl, consequently, at the time of the conquest the Matlazinca and Nahuatl or Mexican was spoken in the region

== The site ==
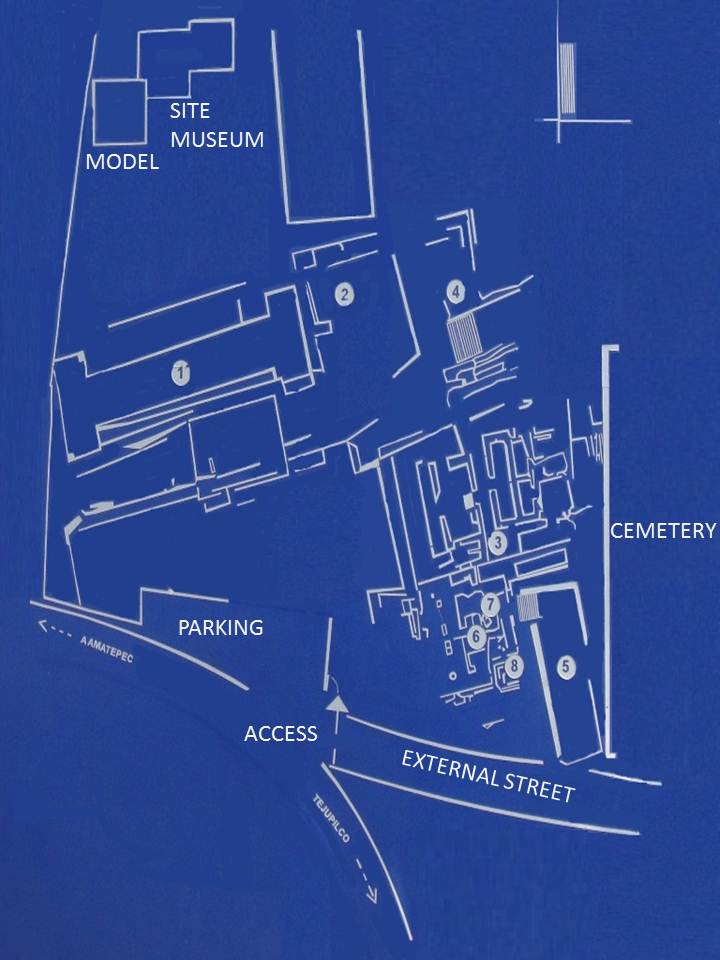
Site arrangement map. 1 Ballgame court, 2 Basement, 3 San Miguel Ixtapan, Model Detail basement, 4 stairway, 5 sunken patio, 6-7 & 8 various structures

In spite of the finding of the "model" rock in 1958, formal archaeological excavations only started in 1985, and Museum construction started in 1993.

In addition to archaeological monuments, San Miguel has a Site Museum that holds and displays many pieces found on site that have been recovered during controlled excavations. This material offers to information about the culture, materials, and way of life of the ancient settlers of the region.

Some of the figurines found in San Miguel Ixtapan indicate an occupation dating back to the formative period, between 800 and 200 BCE, they are very similar to the elaborate Tlapacoya and Tlatilco ceramic; some of them very peculiar represent pregnant women. Others clay figures are similar to those discovered in Teotihuacan phases III and IV (500 and 750 CE) and confirm a continued occupation during the classical period. Much of these objects were found in the deeper layers of the ballgame court. However, the stage of further expansion of San Miguel Ixtapan is during the mesoamerican epiclassical period (750-900 CE). Then is when the principal monuments in the site are built matching the splendor of Xochicalco, Morelos; Teotenango, South of the Valley of Toluca and Cholula, Puebla, cities that flourished after the decline of Teotihuacan.

The main pieces that are exhibited in the Museum belong to the epiclassical mesoamerican period, as the anthropomorphic sculptures with crossed arms, ceramic masks with a kind of eye masking, the ballgame court (tlachmalacátl) stone ring and stone disks carved with the image of a dual serpent in the center. This period corresponds to the sculpture area, where there are two anthropomorphic Stelae carved in green stone and embedded in the ground.

During this time the influence of the culture of the Balsas is stronger than ever, it can be appreciated by the large ceramics amount depicting style similarity. Some vessels are identical to those found at the Caracol dam, near Arcelia, Guerrero. The strong cultural exchange that existed between the cultures of Michoacán and Guerrero is notorious, and in the south of the State Mexico, but also the matlatzincas influence is noted.

In the late postclassical period the region was occupied by Aztecs, who imposed tribute or formed army alliances against the Purépecha. Constructive activity is very poor, however this period correspond to some of the burials with lavish offerings. Shell beads, necklaces, cooper needles, earrings, obsidian "bezotes", spear points, darts and numerous vases accompanied the dead on their journey to the underworld. Many of these objects have been perfectly preserved and can be seen in various Museum showcases.

In the center of town, is the Church of San Miguel Ixtapan, its constructors used carved stone blocks from the archaeological constructions, and in the atrium of the church is another block.

== Structures ==
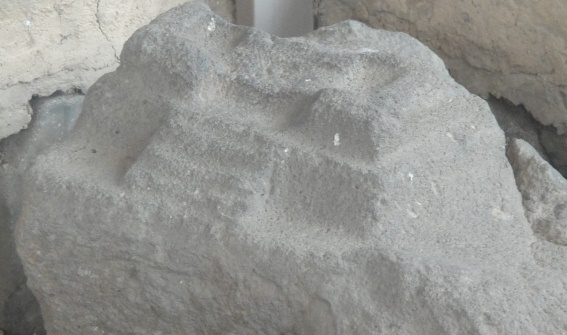
San Miguel Ixtapan, Model Detail

Upon entering the site, to the right side are two huge earth mounds that contain prehispanic ruins, and to the left is the ballgame court.

=== Prehispanic Scale Model ===
The Model [Maqueta, (in Spanish)], according to archaeologists, belongs to the early postclassical (900 to 1200 CE), San Miguel Ixtapan continued to be occupied and its buildings were constantly modified.

Is a three by four meter basaltic rock outgrowth, in which the ancient inhabitants of the place carved with great skills a series of architectonic elements such as: ballgame courts, platforms or foundations, stairways with sides, roofed temples, etc., depicting an exceptional scale ceremonial center. As a result of investigations of this site and neighboring areas, it has been possible to determine that this architectonic complex does not seem to make reference to any of the known sites to date. Hence, more than a "scale model", it seems a Votive offering element in which some type of rites and ceremonies were carried out.

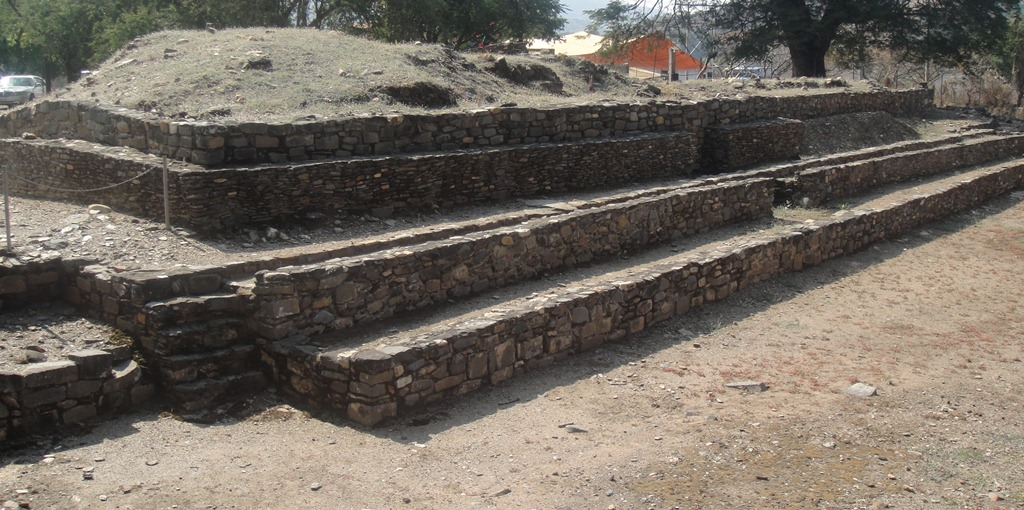
San Miguel Ixtapan, ballgame court, south side

Researchers have called "The model" a rocky outcrop that depicts the architectural design of a city, but the question is: what city?

May well be a city that is still lost; It can also be the drawing of a city yet to be built.

Specialists are not inclined one way or another: it is the architectural model of a City, perhaps conceived at the time, it even contains several spaces (up to five) in the form of ballgame courts.

=== Ballgame Court ===
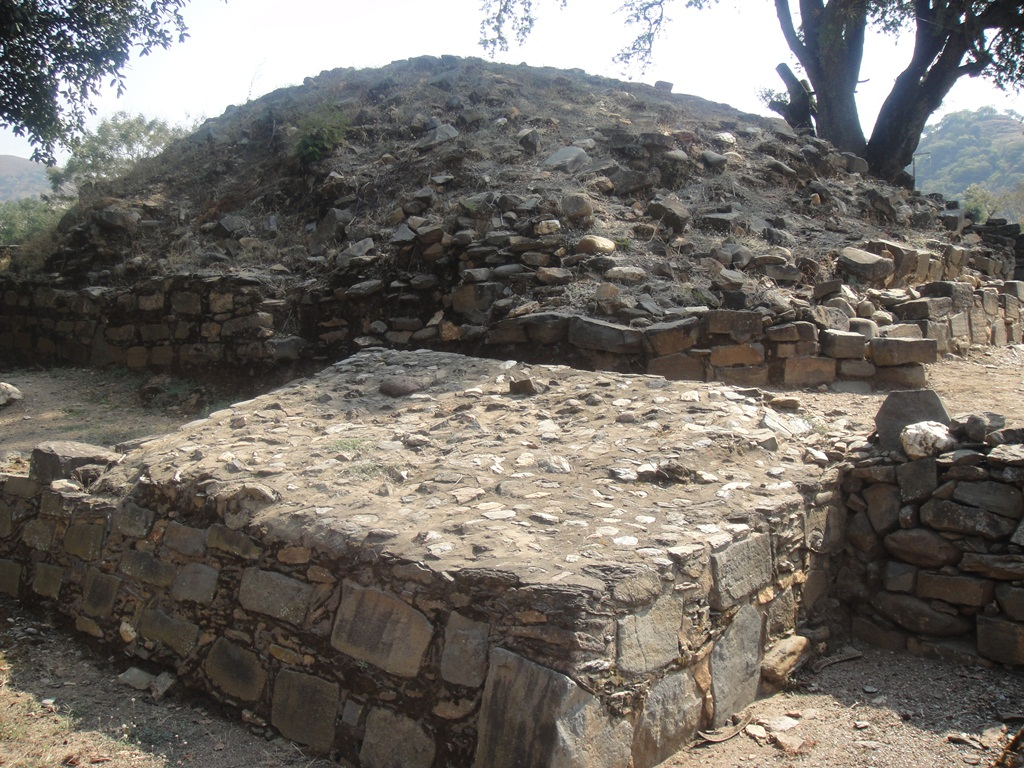
San Miguel Ixtapan, Basement 2

The ballgame court has an outline oriented on an east–west direction; it is capital letter "I" shaped or double "T", the court area measures 50 meters long by 7.50 wide. Headers at both end measure 15 by 7.8 meters. A particularity of this ballgame court consists of the fact that the land was excavated for its construction below grade, reason why access stairways were built to enter the court. Towards the south side, a platform was added (Platform1), where many human burials were found containing rich offerings, from its characteristics this is placed within the postclassical period.

=== Basement 2 ===
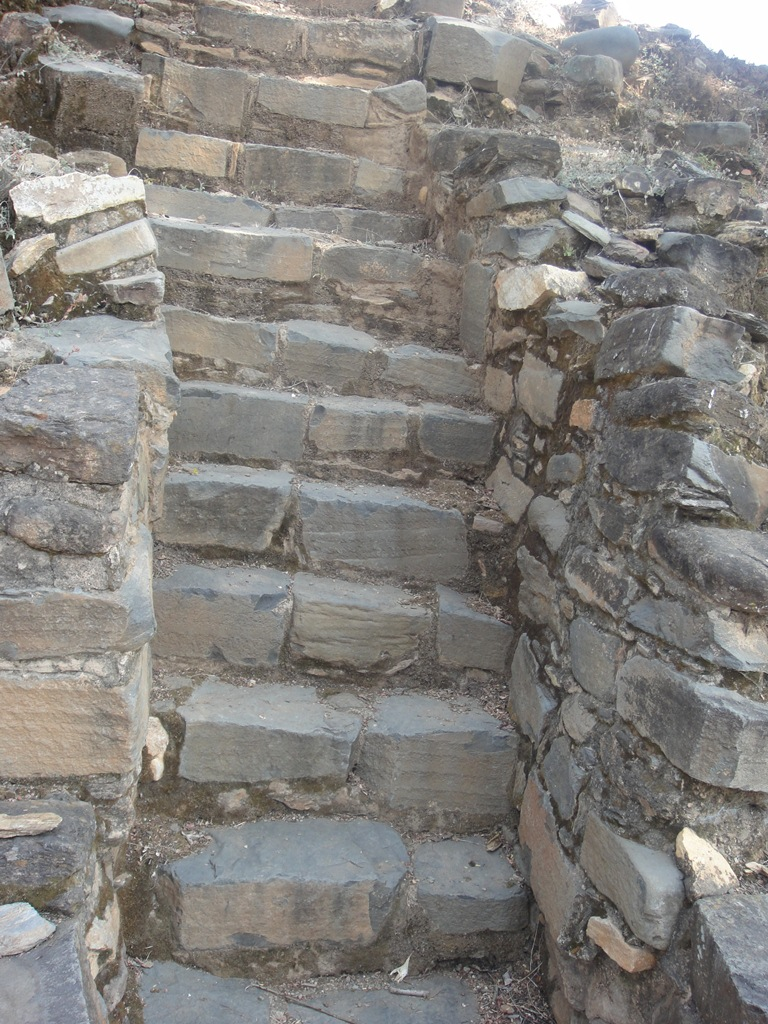
San Miguel Ixtapan, Basement 2 recessed stairway

It is said to have been barely explored, due to the tree on top (see Basement 2 picture).

On its eastern side, have remains of red stucco. On its western side has a recessed stairway.

=== Basement 3 ===
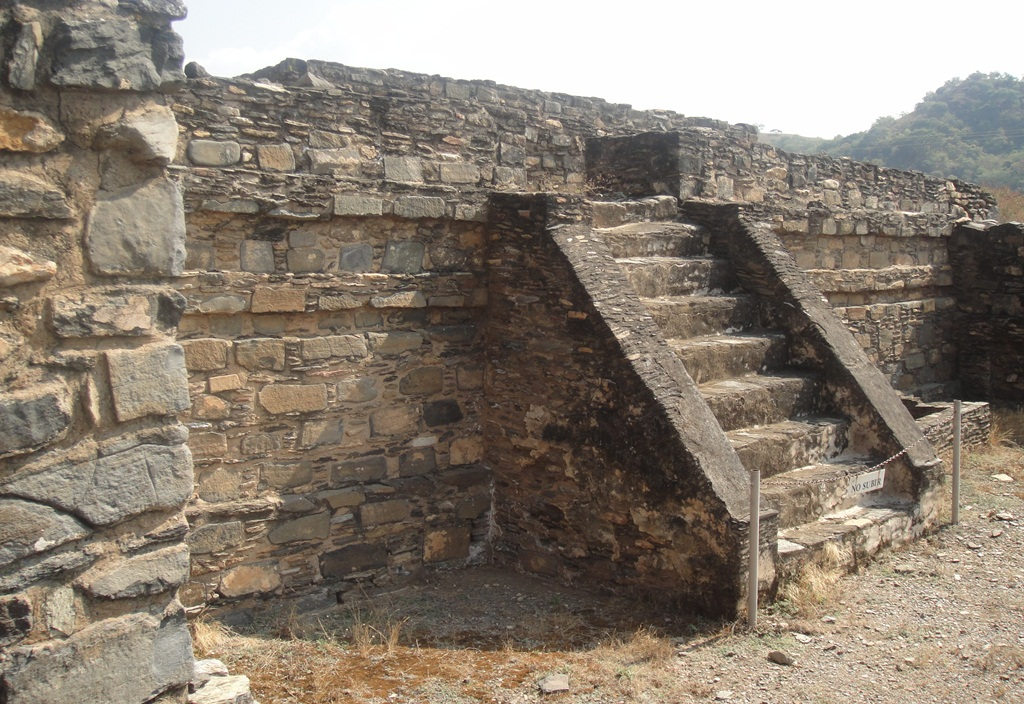
San Miguel Ixtapan, Basement 3 structure on top

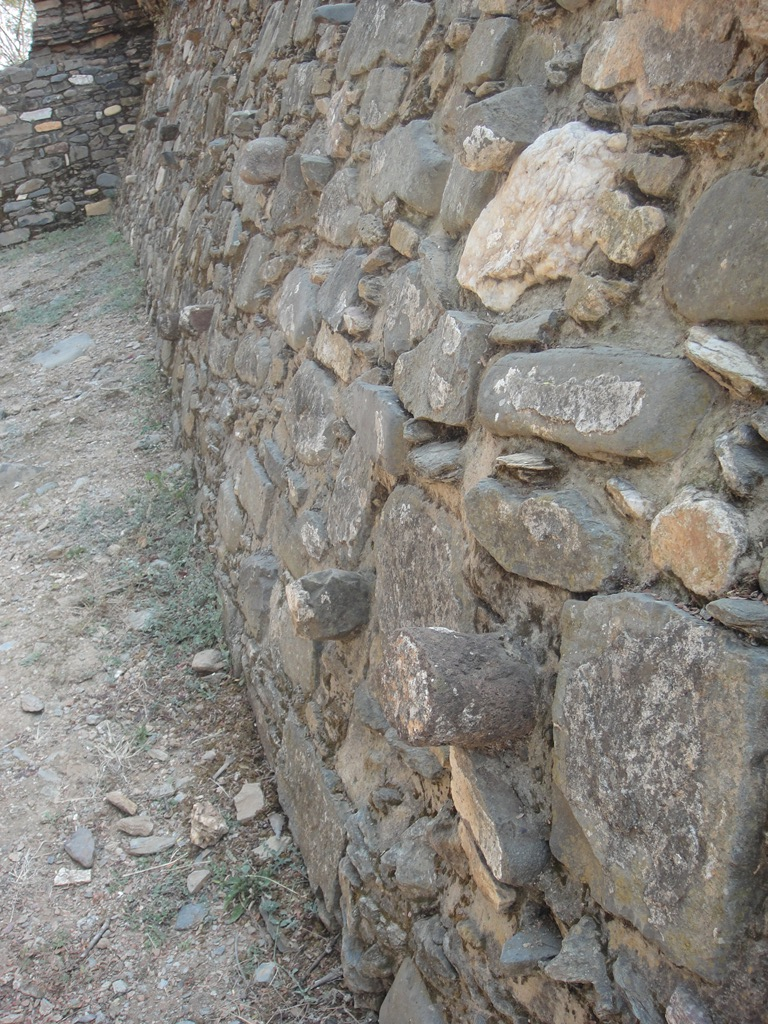
San Miguel Ixtapan, basement 3, stone nails

It is the most important structure on the site.

The structure is composed of three superimposed bodies, with a series of rooms in its superior part, which was accessed by a stairway with intermediate inclined walls (alfardas). The second level of this monument, a complex of overlaid residential-ceremonial enclosures is located distributed on different levels, certainly as a consequence of the need to make modifications to spaces and accesses.

Above the structure is a room, with stucco remains in floor and walls, which probably served for the king to rest.

On the north-west corner is a small niche holding a Tlaloc sculpture, God of water, very important in this area for corn planting, other products and salt collection were the main income sources of the area.

=== Stairway 4 ===
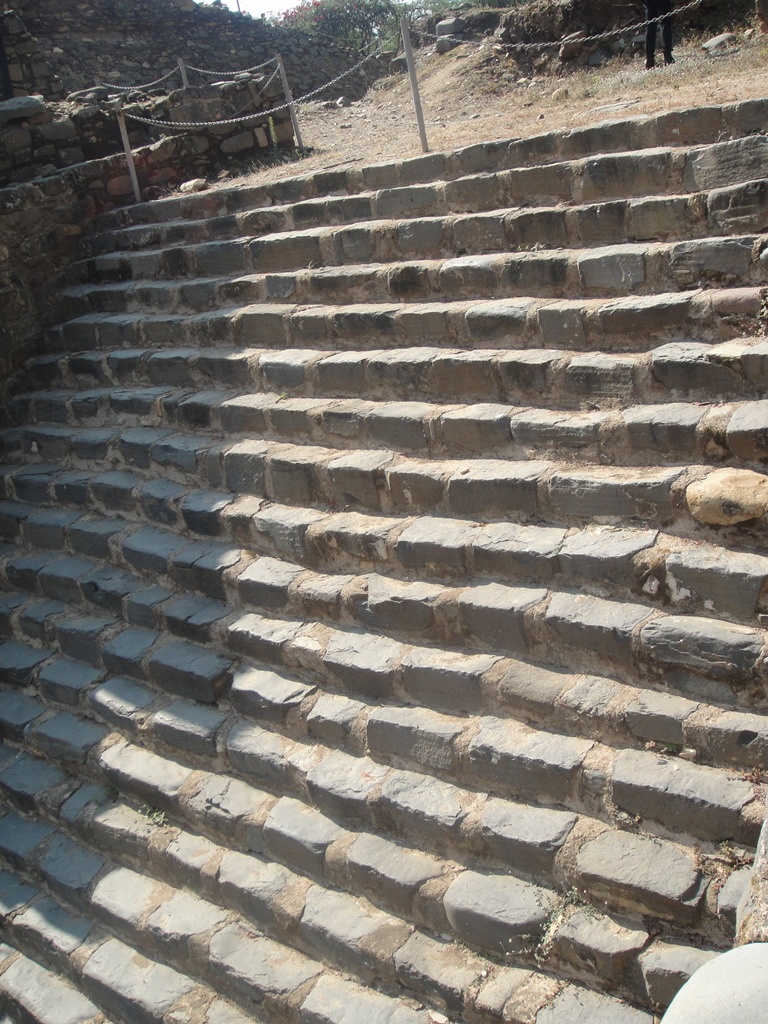
San Miguel Ixtapan, Stairway

On the north side of Basement 3, is a stairway leading down from the Tlaloc niche at site level, it is made from large basalt blocks, below is an external patio, surrounded by a wall. There are remains of a drainage system.

=== Sunken Patio 5 ===
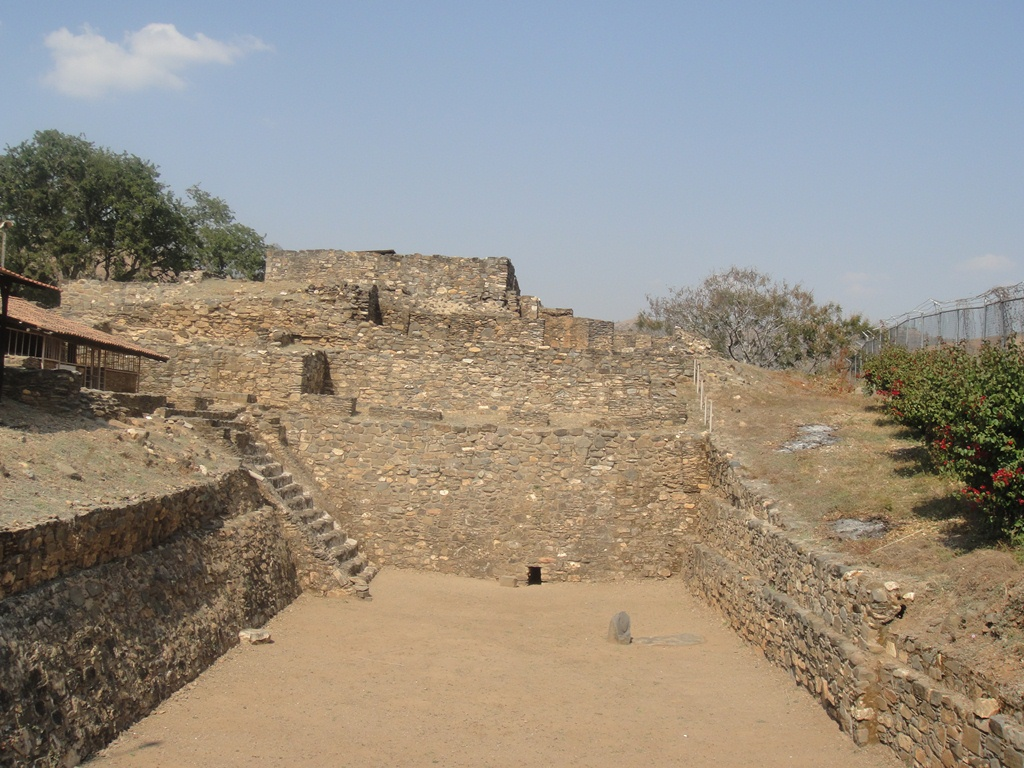
San Miguel Ixtapan, Sunken Patio

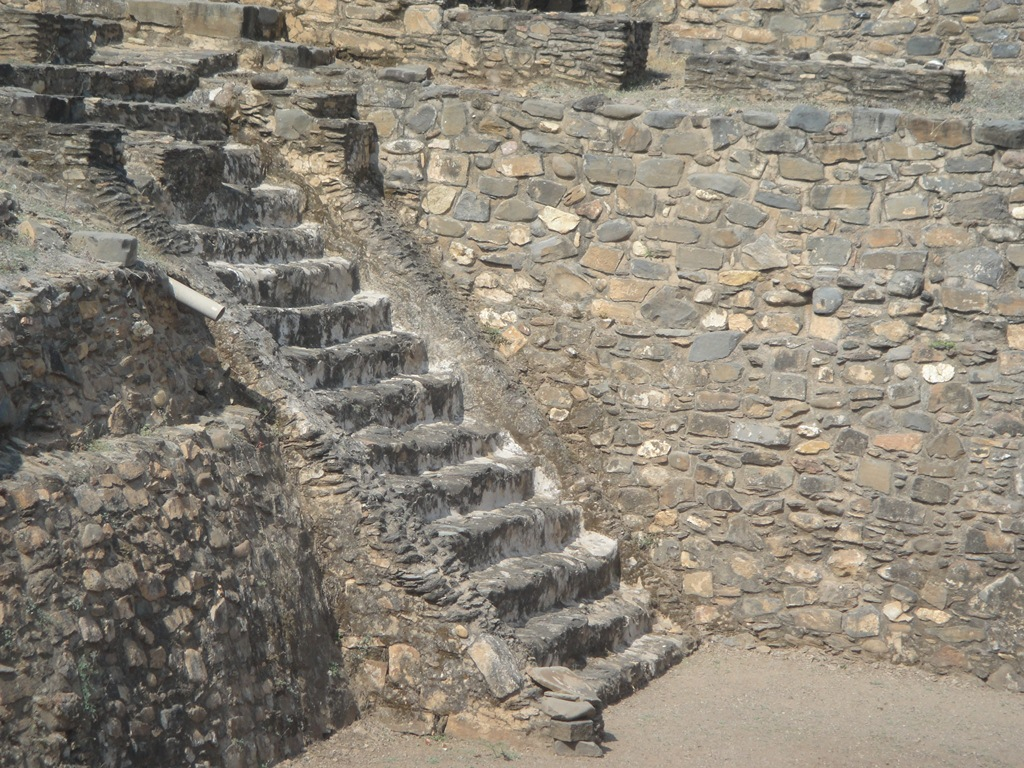
Patio hundido

On the south side of Basement 3 is the "Patio Hundido" (sunken patio), used hundreds of years ago to make offerings and rituals: strategically located so that attendees could focus on it, inside is a sacrificial stone.

It has two access stairways, one with sides finished, leading directly to the "Sculptures Enclosure".

=== Structures 6, 7 & 8 ===
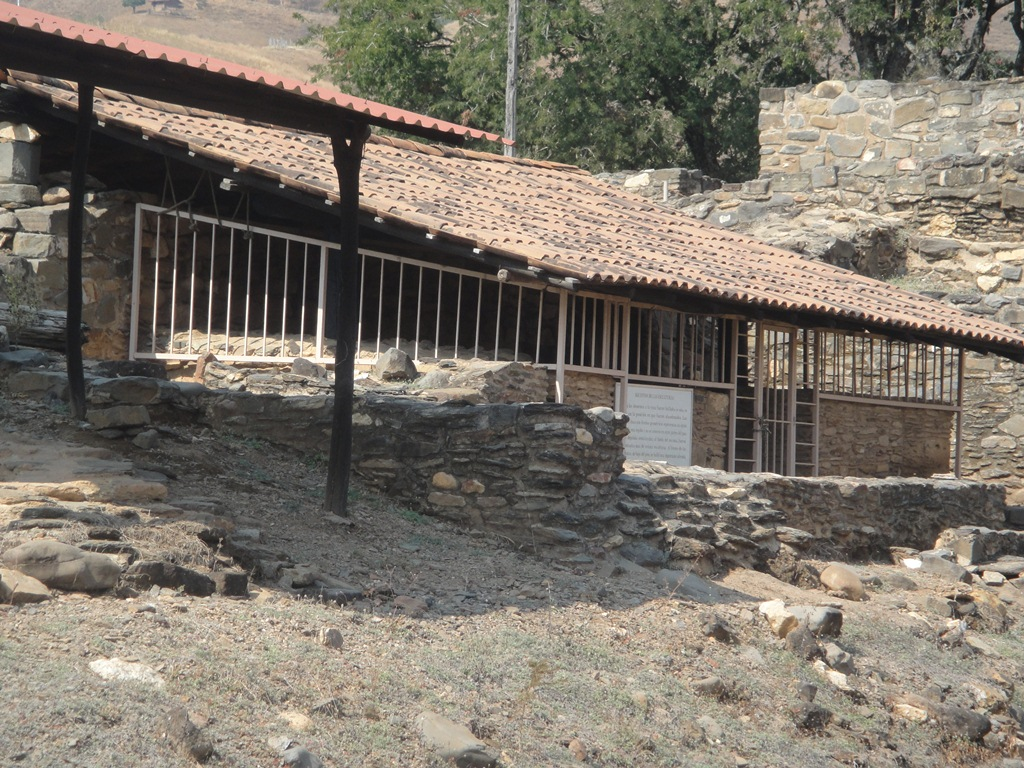
San Miguel Ixtapan, Structures 6, 7 & 8

These structures are not accessible to visitors, the sunken patio and the structures are chained off.

These are located south of basement 3 and west of the sunken patio, at the North West corner.

The enclosures are said to contain the "Recinto de la Banqueta" and the "Recinto de las esculturas", with accesses facing east and west respectively.

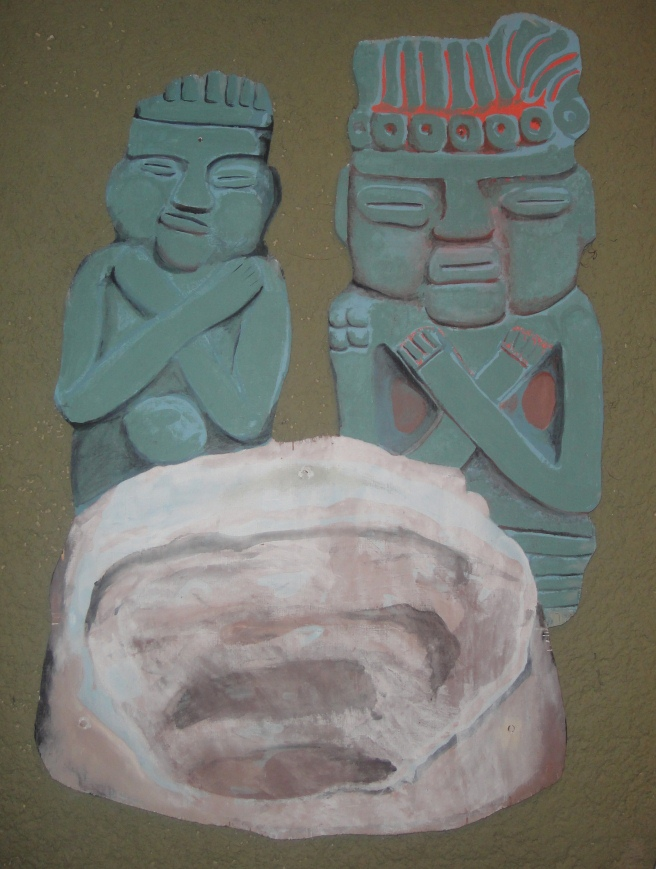
San Miguel Ixtapan, Artistic rendition of the Huiztocihuatl & Tlaloc sculptures

- Recinto de la Esculturas. Is located inside the first structure, a large amount of offerings and figurines was recovered, in addition to two sculptures made with green stone, embedded in the floor, depicting Huiztocihuatl (Goddess of salt water) & Tlaloc (Rain God). This structure was called

so called because most of the figurines exhibited in the site Museum from the archaeological site, made from basalt green stone were found in this place.

- Recinto de la Banqueta. It is one of the two rooms, contains stucco remains in floor and walls, which probably served for the king to rest. This place is known as "Recinto de la banqueta". It also contains a kind of ceremonial walkway, displays as ornament a molding with architectonic stone nails.

Many structures are covered with stucco, perhaps to protect them from destruction due to the many invasions suffered with the Aztec occupation.

== Site Museum ==
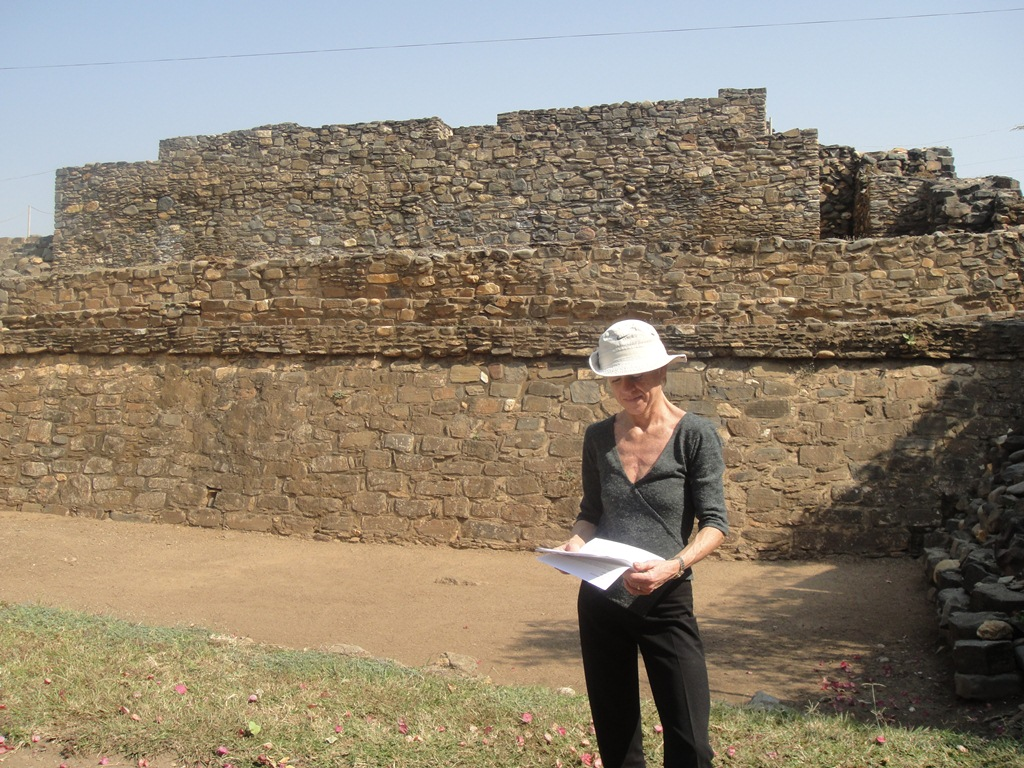
San Miguel Ixtapan, west side of basement 3 & M.C. Clément

The museum was opened in 1995 by the "Instituto Mexiquense de Cultura".

San Miguel has a site museum which exhibits a large amount of recovered pieces. This material provided information about the culture and way of life of the ancient inhabitants of the region.

The Museum is small; however keeps a collection of more than 800 items, many in perfect state of conservation and cleverly distributed pursuant to museographer Jorge Carrandi layout. This material has been discovered, mostly as part of mortuary offerings. By ceramic type and style of the sculptures, it has been chronologically placed from the postclassical mesoamerican period.

Some of the ceramic figures include women figurines, some pregnant, dating back to 800 BCE to 200 CE.

Other pieces belong to the splendor period, between 750 and 900 CE. Including vessels, deities representations, feathers and the skeleton of an important man, exhibited as was found in one of the external mounds.

== Bibliography ==
- Tejupilco (municipality)
- Tejupilco
- State of Mexico
