= WMBJ =

Radio station in South Carolina

- Murrells Inlet, South Carolina; United States
- Broadcast area: Myrtle Beach, South Carolina
- Frequency: 88.3 MHz
- Branding: HIS Radio

Programming
- Format: Christian radio

Ownership
- Owner: Radio Training Network, Inc.

History
- Former call signs: WHGB

Technical information
- Licensing authority: FCC
- Facility ID: 76588
- Class: A
- ERP: 1,800 watts
- HAAT: 101 meters (330 feet)
- Transmitter coordinates: 33°26′35″N 79°08′21″W

Links
- Public license information: Public file; LMS
- Webcast: Listen Live
- Website: https://www.hisradio.com

WMBJ (88.3 FM, "HIS Radio") is a radio station licensed to serve Murrells Inlet, South Carolina. The station is owned by Radio Training Network, Inc. It airs a Christian radio format. In addition to simulcast and syndicated programming, WMBJ airs programming from local churches.

The station was assigned the WMBJ call letters by the Federal Communications Commission on November 18, 1999.

== Translators ==
Call sign	Frequency	City of license	FID	ERP (W)	Class	FCC info
W203BQ	(88.5 FM) FM	Walterboro, SC	154665	30	D	LMS
W227BK	(93.3 FM) FM	Surfside Beach, SC	156477	27	D	LMS
W238BI	(95.5 FM) FM	Georgetown, SC	156519	10	D	LMS
