= WBIY =

- LaBelle, Florida; United States
- Frequency: 88.3 MHz

Programming
- Format: Haitian Creole Christian radio

Ownership
- Owner: Association des Haitiens Vivant a l'Etranger pour le Develop

Technical information
- Licensing authority: FCC
- Facility ID: 86109
- Class: C3
- ERP: 9,000 watts
- HAAT: 70.0 meters (229.7 ft)
- Transmitter coordinates: 26°43′22.00″N 81°30′4.00″W
- Translator: 100.5 W263BY (Naples)

Links
- Public license information: Public file; LMS

WBIY (88.3 FM) is a non-commercial, listener-supported radio station licensed to LaBelle, Florida. The station is owned by the Association des Haitiens Vivant a l'Etranger pour le Develop.

WBIY airs a Haitian Creole Christian radio format. It is also heard on FM translator 100.5 W263BY in Naples, Florida.
