= WFEN =

- Rockford, Illinois; United States
- Broadcast area: Rockford metropolitan area; Madison, Wisconsin
- Frequency: 88.3 MHz (HD Radio)
- Branding: The Lighthouse

Programming
- Format: Christian

Ownership
- Owner: Faith Center

History
- First air date: August 25, 1991
- Call sign meaning: Faith Education Network

Technical information
- Licensing authority: FCC
- Facility ID: 20468
- Class: B
- ERP: 1,000 watts horizontal; 8,500 watts vertical
- HAAT: 175 meters (574 ft)
- Transmitter coordinates: 42°21′48.1″N 89°8′6.4″W
- Translators: 103.3 W277AE (Madison, Wisconsin)

Links
- Public license information: Public file; LMS
- Webcast: Listen live
- Website: www.wfen.org

WFEN (88.3 FM) is a radio station licensed to Rockford, Illinois, United States, the station serves the Rockford and surrounding area. WFEN features contemporary Christian music and Christian talk and teaching. Other weekly programming includes Gospel Country with John Tallecksen, The Gospel Greats with Rodney Baucom, and "20" The countdown magazine with William Ryan III. WFEN also broadcasts teaching programs from Bob Yandian, Joyce Meyer, Apostle Don Lyon and others. The station is owned and locally programmed by Faith Center, a charismatic church in Rockford.

Former logo
