= KOEG =

- Walters, Oklahoma; United States
- Broadcast area: Lawton, Oklahoma
- Frequency: 88.3 MHz
- Branding: Oklahoma Catholic Radio

Programming
- Format: Catholic Religious

Ownership
- Owner: Oklahoma Catholic Broadcasting, Inc.

History
- First air date: 2009

Technical information
- Licensing authority: FCC
- Facility ID: 173588
- Class: C3
- ERP: 10,000 watts
- HAAT: 51.3 meters (168 ft)
- Transmitter coordinates: 34°30′20.10″N 98°24′5″W

Links
- Public license information: Public file; LMS
- Website: okcr.org

KOEG (88.3 FM) in Walters is a radio station broadcasting a Catholic religious format. The station is owned by Oklahoma Catholic Broadcasting, Inc.

== History ==
This station was assigned call sign KOEG on September 4, 2009.
