= WJLY =

- Ramsey, Illinois; United States
- Broadcast area: Vandalia, Illinois; Effingham, Illinois; Pana, Illinois
- Frequency: 88.3 MHz

Programming
- Format: Christian radio

Ownership
- Owner: Countryside Broadcasting

History
- First air date: 1999
- Call sign meaning: "Jesus Loves You"

Technical information
- Licensing authority: FCC
- Facility ID: 78719
- Class: B
- ERP: 25,000 watts
- HAAT: 153 meters (502 ft)
- Transmitter coordinates: 39°8′6.2″N 89°6′2.3″W

Links
- Public license information: Public file; LMS
- Webcast: Listen live
- Website: wjly.org

WJLY is a Christian radio station licensed to Ramsey, Illinois, broadcasting on 88.3 FM. The station serves the areas of Vandalia, Illinois, Effingham, Illinois, Pana, Illinois, Hillsboro, Illinois, and Shelbyville, Illinois, and is owned by Countryside Broadcasting.
