= WSBU =

- St. Bonaventure, New York; United States
- Broadcast area: Allegany/Olean, New York
- Frequency: 88.3 (MHz)
- Branding: The Buzz

Programming
- Format: Alternative rock, hip-hop, classic rock

Ownership
- Owner: St. Bonaventure University

History
- First air date: 1948
- Call sign meaning: St. Bonaventure University

Technical information
- Class: A
- ERP: 165 watts
- HAAT: -78 meters
- Transmitter coordinates: 42.07981°N 78.48516°W

Links
- Website: WSBU-FM 88.3 The Buzz

WSBU is the American non-commercial radio station of St. Bonaventure University. It is licensed to the census-designated place of Saint Bonaventure, New York and broadcasts in the area around Allegany and Olean, New York.

Officially known as Rock Radio 88.3 The Buzz, WSBU is entirely student-run and managed, ranking No. 1 on the Princeton Review's list of best college radio stations. The Buzz's format is wide-ranged, with alternative rock during the week and hip-hop and classic rock on the weekends. In 2006, the station set up an account with Live365 and is now simulcast over the internet by accessing the station's website.

The station also produces student written newscasts that are broadcast every Monday - Friday at noon and every Monday - Thursday at 5 p.m. Each newscast features news stories on the national, international and local levels, as well as weather and entertainment. Each newscast also features a sports cast, which is written by a member of the sports department. The station previously had a sports department; it has since sold off its sports rights to commercial broadcasters (baseball to WHDL and women's basketball to WGWE), then moved online; the university announced the sports department would be revived in 2024 with select women's basketball games not being carried on WBRR.

The station is managed by a 16-student board of directors, with separate departments for programming, public relations, music, production, promotions, marketing, news and sports. The board is overseen by the station manager, a student who is elected at the end of every fall semester.

The station temporarily went off the air in October 2010 after the Federal Communications Commission claimed it did not file a license renewal in 2005. The station claimed not to have received any notification from the FCC about the license issue until 2010, when the FCC deleted the station from its database. It returned to the air under special temporary authority a few days later.
