= DXWC =

Radio station in Zamboanga City, Philippines

Peace 88.3 (DXWC)
Zamboanga City; Philippines
- Broadcast area: Zamboanga City, Basilan and surrounding areas
- Frequency: 88.3 MHz
- Branding: Peace 88.3

Programming
- Languages: Chavacano, Filipino
- Format: News, Public Affairs, Talk

Ownership
- Owner: Western Mindanao Command

History
- First air date: October 2012
- Former call signs: DXPR (2012–2016)
- Call sign meaning: Western Mindanao Command

Technical information
- Licensing authority: NTC
- Power: 10,000 watts

DXWC (88.3 FM), broadcasting as Peace 88.3, is a radio station owned and operated by the Western Mindanao Command through its 4th Civil Relations Group. Its studios are located inside the WesMinCom gymnasium, Camp General Basilio Navarro, Brgy. Upper Calarian, Zamboanga City.
