= KBNR =

Radio station in Brownsville, Texas

- Brownsville, Texas; United States
- Broadcast area: Rio Grande Valley
- Frequency: 88.3 MHz
- Branding: Manantial FM

Programming
- Language: Spanish
- Format: Christian radio

Ownership
- Owner: World Radio Network, Inc.

Technical information
- Licensing authority: FCC
- Class: A
- ERP: 5,500 watts
- HAAT: 88 meters (289 ft)
- Transmitter coordinates: 25°55′10″N 97°31′44″W

Links
- Public license information: Public file; LMS
- Webcast: Listen live
- Website: www.radiokbnr.org

KBNR is a Spanish language Christian radio station licensed to Brownsville, Texas, United States, broadcasting on 88.3 FM. KBNR serves the Brownsville, Texas - Matamoros, Tamaulipas area, and is owned by World Radio Network, Inc.
