= KYEC =

- Doniphan, Missouri; United States
- Frequency: 88.3 MHz
- Branding: "KYEC 88.3 FM"

Programming
- Format: Hot adult contemporary

Ownership
- Owner: Central Educational Radio

Technical information
- Licensing authority: FCC
- Facility ID: 173551
- Class: C3
- ERP: 11,000 watts
- HAAT: 96 metres (315 ft)
- Transmitter coordinates: 36°35′20″N 90°49′10″W
- Translators: K252EE (98.3 MHz, Poplar Bluff)

Links
- Public license information: Public file; LMS
- Website: www.foxradionetwork.com/kyec

KYEC (88.3 FM) is a radio station licensed to serve the community of Doniphan, Missouri. The station is owned by Central Educational Radio, and airs a hot adult contemporary format.

The station was assigned the KYEC call letters by the Federal Communications Commission on November 10, 2010.
