= WHCM =

Radio station at William Rainey Harper College in Palatine, Illinois

- Palatine, Illinois; United States
- Frequency: 88.3 MHz
- Branding: Harper Radio

Programming
- Format: College radio

Ownership
- Owner: William Rainey Harper College

History
- Founded: 1970 (campus-only)
- First air date: 2002

Technical information
- Licensing authority: FCC
- Facility ID: 163899
- Class: A
- ERP: 100 watts
- HAAT: 17.1 meters (56 ft)
- Transmitter coordinates: 42°4′54″N 88°4′23″W

Links
- Public license information: Public file; LMS
- Webcast: Listen live
- Website: www.harperradio.com

WHCM (88.3 FM) is a student-run campus radio station at William Rainey Harper College in Palatine, Illinois. WHCM offers freeform music, news, talk and public affairs programming 24 hours a day, 7 days a week. WHCM is part of the college's Division of Liberal Arts and Department of Communication Arts.

== History ==
WHCM was founded in 1970 as a campus radio station at Harper College. The initials were chosen to represent "Harper College Music". The station was located in room A339 in what is currently the Student Center. It was equipped with a control console, amplifier and two turntables. Student DJs hosted free format shows, a trend that continues in WHCM'S current broadcasts.

In March 1998, while the station was only broadcast to the student lounge and cafeteria, it was shut down for a week by a staff administrator for "music choices, volume control, and 'lewd' comments by disc jockeys." It began broadcasting again on March 25, after students agreed to adopt a new contract, and to keep their office neat.

The Harper College application for a new FM station in Palatine was approved by the FCC on November 6, 2000, with a license to cover filed in December 2002. The station, however, had broadcast on campus prior to going on air. WHCM was to share time with Arlington Heights-licensed WCLR, originally to be owned by the Church of Christian Liberty but sold to the Educational Media Foundation before going on air. WHCM operated Monday through Thursday during the school year, with WCLR allotted Fridays, Saturdays, Sundays, and full-time during school breaks.

On May 17, 2017, EMF and Harper College reached an agreement in 2017 by which EMF would surrender the license for WCLR to allow WHCM to go full-time on 88.3 MHz. Harper College paid $13,600, representing EMF's outstanding obligation on the WCLR tower lease, and up to $5,000 in EMF's legal fees. WHCM went full-time on June 29, 2017.

On October 1, 2019, WHCM added a Radio Data System (RDS) to identify song and artist, and upgraded their streaming encoder to improve sound quality.
