= Greenacres, California =

Greenacres
- census-designated place
- Location of Greenacres in Kern County, California.

- Location in California
- Coordinates: 35°23′00″N 119°06′35″W
- Country: United States
- State: California
- County: Kern

Area
  - Total: 1.905 sq mi (4.935 km^{2})
  - Land: 1.905 sq mi (4.935 km^{2})
  - Water: 0 sq mi (0 km^{2}) 0%
- Elevation: 381 ft (116 m)

Population (2020)
  - Total: 5,496
  - Density: 2,884/sq mi (1,114/km^{2})
- Time zone: UTC-8 (Pacific (PST))
  - Summer (DST): UTC-7 (PDT)
- GNIS feature IDs: 1652714; 2628814

Greenacres (formerly Green Acres) is a census-designated place in Kern County, California, United States. It is located 6.25 miles (10 km) west of Bakersfield, at an elevation of 381 feet (116 m). The population was 5,496 at the 2020 census.

Greenacres was founded in 1930.

== Geography ==
According to the United States Census Bureau, Greenacres covers 1.905 square miles (4.93 km^{2}), all land.

== Demographics ==
Historical population
Census	Pop.	Note	%±
1970	2,116		—
1980	5,381		154.3%
1990	7,379		37.1%
2010	5,566		—
2020	5,496		−1.3%
U.S. Decennial Census; 1860–1870 1880-1890; 1900 1910 1920; 1930 1940 1950; 1960 1970 1980; 1990 2000 2010; 2020

Greenacres first appeared as an unincorporated place in the 1970 U.S. census; and as a census designated place in the 1980 U.S. census. The CDP was deleted prior to the 2000 U.S. census after being partly annexed to the city of Bakersfield. The remaining area was again designated as census designated place in the 2010 U.S. census.

=== Racial and ethnic composition ===
Greenacres CDP, California – Racial and ethnic composition Note: the US Census treats Hispanic/Latino as an ethnic category. This table excludes Latinos from the racial categories and assigns them to a separate category. Hispanics/Latinos may be of any race.
Race / Ethnicity (NH = Non-Hispanic)	Pop 2010	Pop 2020	% 2010	% 2020
White alone (NH)	4,118	3,450	73.98%	62.77%
Black or African American alone (NH)	44	74	0.79%	1.35%
Native American or Alaska Native alone (NH)	97	53	1.74%	0.96%
Asian alone (NH)	60	106	1.08%	1.93%
Native Hawaiian or Pacific Islander alone (NH)	8	6	0.14%	0.11%
Other race alone (NH)	11	26	0.20%	0.47%
Mixed race or Multiracial (NH)	109	314	1.96%	5.71%
Hispanic or Latino (any race)	1,119	1,467	20.10%	26.69%
Total	5,566	5,496	100.00%	100.00%

=== 2020 census ===
As of the 2020 census, Greenacres had a population of 5,496. The population density was 2,885.0 inhabitants per square mile (1,113.9/km^{2}).

The age distribution was 23.7% under the age of 18, 7.9% aged 18 to 24, 25.0% aged 25 to 44, 25.8% aged 45 to 64, and 17.6% who were 65 years of age or older. The median age was 39.4 years. For every 100 females, there were 101.1 males, and for every 100 females age 18 and over there were 97.1 males age 18 and over.

The census reported that 99.8% of the population lived in households, 11 people (0.2%) lived in non-institutionalized group quarters, and no one was institutionalized. 100.0% of residents lived in urban areas, while 0.0% lived in rural areas.

There were 1,963 households, out of which 33.9% included children under the age of 18, 51.7% were married-couple households, 6.7% were cohabiting couple households, 23.1% had a female householder with no partner present, and 18.5% had a male householder with no partner present. 22.5% of households were one person, and 10.9% were one person aged 65 or older. The average household size was 2.79. There were 1,435 families (73.1% of all households).

There were 2,040 housing units at an average density of 1,070.9 units per square mile (413.5 units/km^{2}), of which 1,963 (96.2%) were occupied and 3.8% were vacant. Of occupied housing units, 77.4% were owner-occupied and 22.6% were renter-occupied. The homeowner vacancy rate was 0.8%, and the rental vacancy rate was 4.9%.

=== Income and poverty ===
In 2023, the US Census Bureau estimated that the median household income in 2023 was $81,369, and the per capita income was $39,405. About 4.3% of families and 4.7% of the population were below the poverty line.
