= KQLF =

- Ottumwa, Iowa; United States
- Frequency: 88.3 MHz
- Branding: Lift FM

Programming
- Format: Christian Radio

Ownership
- Owner: Sound In Spirit Broadcasting, Inc.

Technical information
- Licensing authority: FCC
- Facility ID: 85844
- Class: A
- ERP: 1,400 watts
- HAAT: 44 meters (144 ft)
- Transmitter coordinates: 40°55′45″N 92°23′03″W

Links
- Public license information: Public file; LMS
- Website: liftfmfamily.com

KQLF is a Christian radio station licensed to Ottumwa, Iowa, broadcasting on 88.3 MHz. KQLF is owned by Sound In Spirit Broadcasting, Inc.

KQLF's programming includes Christian music and Christian talk and teaching shows such as Revive Our Hearts with Nancy Leigh DeMoss, Focus on the Family, Turning Point with David Jeremiah, In Touch with Charles Stanley, Insight for Living with Chuck Swindoll, Love Worth Finding with Adrian Rogers, and Unshackled!.

== Translators ==
KQLF is also heard in Fairfield, Iowa through a translator at 102.3 FM.

| Call sign | Frequency | City of license | FID | ERP (W) | Class | FCC info |
|---|---|---|---|---|---|---|
| W272AL | 102.3 FM | Fairfield, Iowa | 20472 | 213 | D | LMS |
