= XHUX-FM =

- Tepic, Nayarit; Mexico
- Frequency: 92.1 FM
- Branding: Lokura FM Pop

Programming
- Format: Pop

Ownership
- Owner: Capital Media (50%); (Master Radio de Occidente, S.A. de C.V.)

History
- First air date: May 3, 1950 (concession)
- Former frequencies: 810 kHz
- Call sign meaning: UX from Tuxpan, original location

Technical information
- Licensing authority: CRT
- Class: B1
- ERP: 25 kW
- HAAT: 329.12 m (1,079.8 ft)
- Transmitter coordinates: 21°43′44″N 105°03′55″W

Links
- Webcast: Listen live
- Website: lokura.fm/tepic

XHUX-FM is a radio station on 92.1 FM in Tepic, Nayarit, Mexico, with transmitter in El Jicote. The station is half-owned by Capital Media, which operates it as Lokura FM Pop with a pop format.

== History ==
XHUX began as XEUX-AM 810, located in Tuxpan, Nayarit, with a concession awarded to Salvador Herena Benítez on May 3, 1950. In 2010, Luis Eduardo Stephens Zavala sold the station to Master Radio de Occidente, which is 50 percent owned by Capital Media, 25 percent by Stephens Zavala and 25 percent by Corporativo Difusión Atemajac, the primary shareholder of the concessionaire for XHXT-FM.

In 2011, XEUX migrated to FM as XHUX-FM 92.1.

Alica Medios took over operation of XHUX on May 17, 2021, and programmed it as grupera-formatted La Patrona. After Alica obtained the concession for XHCCBJ-FM 99.3 in the IFT-8 radio station auction of 2022, it moved the programming there and returned XHUX to Capital. Lokura FM was split into rock, pop, and grupera brands in 2023, with the pop format being installed at XHUX.
