= KFFR =

- Winter Park, Colorado; United States
- Frequency: 88.3 MHz
- Branding: KFFR 88.3 FM

Programming
- Format: Community radio

Ownership
- Owner: Fraser Valley Community Media, Inc.

History
- First air date: April 2015

Technical information
- Licensing authority: FCC
- Facility ID: 175799
- Class: C3
- ERP: 10,000 watts
- HAAT: −171 metres (−561 ft)
- Transmitter coordinates: 40°00′28″N 105°47′40″W

Links
- Public license information: Public file; LMS
- Webcast: Listen Live
- Website: Official Website

KFFR (88.3 FM) is a radio station licensed to serve the community of Winter Park, Colorado. The station is owned by Fraser Valley Community Media, Inc. It airs a community radio format.

The station was assigned the KFFR call letters by the Federal Communications Commission on February 5, 2013. KFFR began broadcasting in April 2015. Today, it operates with a small staff and more than 70 community volunteers.
