= WXTS-FM =

- Toledo, Ohio; United States
- Broadcast area: Toledo
- Frequency: 88.3 MHz
- Branding: Real Jazz 88.3

Programming
- Format: Jazz

Ownership
- Owner: Toledo Public Schools; (Board of Education Toledo City School District)

History
- First air date: September 21, 1979
- Former call signs: WAMP (1979-1989)

Technical information
- Licensing authority: FCC
- Facility ID: 4194
- Class: A
- ERP: 105 watts
- HAAT: 38.0 meters
- Transmitter coordinates: 41°40′7.00″N 83°33′15.00″W

Links
- Public license information: Public file; LMS

WXTS-FM (88.3 FM) is a non-commercial educational radio station licensed to Toledo, Ohio. WXTS broadcasts on 88.3 from 8 am to 8 pm, with WXUT broadcasting on the frequency from 8 pm to 8 am. The station is currently owned by Toledo Public Schools.

== See also ==
- WXUT (shares frequency with WXTS-FM)
