= XHXT-FM =

Radio station in Tepic, Nayarit

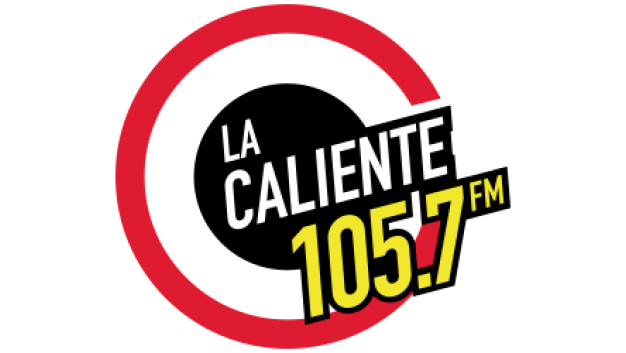
- Tepic, Nayarit; Mexico
- Frequency: 105.7 FM
- Branding: La Caliente

Programming
- Format: Grupera

Ownership
- Owner: Amplitudes y Frecuencias de Occidente, S.A. de C.V.
- Operator: Multimedios Radio
- Sister stations: XHPCTN-FM

History
- First air date: September 22, 1939 (concession)
- Former frequencies: 1290 kHz, 980 kHz, 107.3 MHz

Technical information
- Licensing authority: CRT
- Class: B1
- ERP: 10 kW
- HAAT: 329.87 m (1,082.3 ft)
- Transmitter coordinates: 21°32′14.56″N 104°54′45.23″W

XHXT-FM is a radio station on 105.7 FM in Tepic, Nayarit. The station is operated by Multimedios Radio and carries its La Caliente grupera format. XHXT is owned by Amplitudes y Frecuencias de Occidente, whose parent also holds 25 percent of the concession in XHUX-FM 92.1.

== History ==
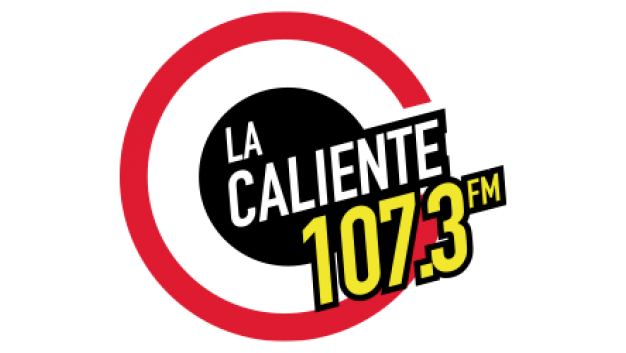
La Caliente 107.3 logo used between 2017 and 2018

XEXT-AM, the first radio station in Nayarit, received its original concession on September 22, 1939. It was owned by the government of the state of Nayarit, originally provided 1290 kHz but promptly changed to 980 with 580 watts, soon changed to 1,000. It was privatized in 1941 when the state government sold XEXT to Mario Bertrand García de la Cadena. In turn, XEXT was sold to Radiofónica de Nayarit, S. de R.L.

In 2005, the concession for XEXT was transferred to Grupo Radio Capital and then in 2010 to its current concessionaire, which in 2018 was primarily owned by Corporativo Difusión Atemajac, S.A. de C.V., a 25-percent owner of XHUX-FM. Also in 2010, the station was authorized to migrate to FM on 107.3 MHz. Operation of the station is currently conducted by Multimedios Radio.

In 2017, XHXT-FM's concession was renewed on the condition that it move to 105.7 MHz in order to clear 106-108 MHz as much as possible for community radio stations. The frequency change took place on May 11, 2018.
