= WBMT =

- Boxford, Massachusetts; United States
- Frequency: 88.3 MHz

Programming
- Format: Album oriented rock

Ownership
- Owner: Masconomet Regional School District

History
- First air date: January 30, 1978

Technical information
- Licensing authority: FCC
- Facility ID: 40640
- Class: A
- Power: 660 watts
- HAAT: 10 meters (33 ft)
- Transmitter coordinates: 42°37′38.3″N 70°58′30.1″W

Links
- Public license information: Public file; LMS
- Website: www.masconomet.org/WBMT

WBMT (88.3 FM) is a radio station broadcasting an album-oriented rock format. The station is licensed to Boxford, Massachusetts, United States, and is owned by the Masconomet Regional School District.

Broadcasting from Masconomet Regional High School, the station is primarily run and managed by students as an extracurricular activity. Broadcasts usually occur on weekday afternoons until 9 p.m., as well as on weekend afternoons (the weekend schedule varies). The station also conducts an annual "radiothon" every Memorial Day weekend, with sponsorship from local businesses.
