= WUAW =

- Erwin, North Carolina; United States
- Broadcast area: Fayetteville, North Carolina
- Frequency: 88.3 MHz
- Branding: "The Beat"

Programming
- Format: Contemporary hit radio

Ownership
- Owner: Central Carolina Community College

History
- First air date: May 11, 1990
- Call sign meaning: "What U Always Wanted"

Technical information
- Licensing authority: FCC
- Facility ID: 9842
- Class: A
- ERP: 3,000 watts
- HAAT: 63 meters (207 ft)
- Transmitter coordinates: 35°20′15″N 78°39′49″W

Links
- Public license information: Public file; LMS
- Website: wuawfm.com

WUAW (88.3 FM) is an educational radio station licensed in Erwin, North Carolina, United States, and serving the Erwin, Dunn, Coats and Lillington areas. It broadcasts genres including adult contemporary, alternative rock, top-40, and country music.

The station is owned by Central Carolina Community College as part of its Broadcast Production Technology program. The station's transmitter and tower are located one mile east of U.S. Highway 421 in Erwin, North Carolina.
