= WMMA (AM) =

Radio station in Irondale, Alabama

- Irondale, Alabama; United States
- Broadcast area: Birmingham metropolitan area
- Frequency: 1480 kHz
- Branding: Radio For Your Soul

Programming
- Format: Catholic radio
- Affiliations: EWTN Radio

Ownership
- Owner: La Promesa Foundation
- Sister stations: WJUV, WQOH-FM

History
- First air date: December 5, 1960
- Former call signs: WIXI (1960–1965); WLPH (1965–2006); WRLM (2006–2008); WQOH (2008–2016) (
- Call sign meaning: Mother Mary Angelica, founder of EWTN

Technical information
- Licensing authority: FCC
- Facility ID: 726
- Class: D
- Power: 5,000 watts (day); 28 watts (night)
- Transmitter coordinates: 33.5483°N 86.6656°W
- Translator: 97.9 W262AR (Irondale)

Links
- Public license information: Public file; LMS

WMMA (1480 AM) is a non-commercial radio station licensed to Irondale, Alabama, United States, and serving Greater Birmingham. It is owned by La Promesa Foundation and airs a Catholic radio format including some programming provided by EWTN.

WMMA programming is also heard on FM translator W262AR at 97.9 MHz.

== History ==
=== Country music and R&B ===
The station signed on the air in December 5, 1960. Its original call sign was WIXI and it was a daytimer. It ran 5,000 watts but had to go off the air at night. It was ownered by the Jefferson Radio Company. The station's initial format included 45 hours per week of country & western music and 20 hours per week of what was then called "Negro" music.

The station was sold to the Birmingham Broadcasting Company in a transaction consummated on September 8, 1964. In 1965, the new owners had the station's call sign changed to WLPH. The station played country music through the late 1960s.

=== Religion and Latino ===
In 1971, WLPH transitioned to a religious radio format featuring preaching shows and Southern Gospel music. The license holding company changed its name to the Alabama Religious Broadcasting Company to reflect the new direction for the station.

In March 1997, Alabama Religious Broadcasting Company reached an agreement to sell this station to Willis Broadcasting of Norfolk, Virginia, through its Birmingham Christian Radio, Inc., subsidiary. The deal was approved by the FCC on May 13, 1997, and the transaction was consummated on August 22, 1997. The new owners shifted the music played on WLPH to Black Gospel.

In July 2006, Birmingham Christian Radio, Inc., reached an agreement to sell this station to Davidson Broadcasting through the company's Davidson Media Station WLPH Licensee, LLC, subsidiary. The deal was approved by the FCC on September 8, 2006, and the transaction was consummated on November 3, 2006. The new owners had the station's call sign changed to WRLM on November 7, 2006. As WRLM, this station broadcast a Spanish language music format branded as "Latino Mix".

=== Catholic radio ===
In March 2008, Davidson Media Group LLC sold the station to Queen of Heaven Catholic Radio Inc. for a reported $575,000. The deal was approved by the FCC on May 29, 2008, and the transaction was consummated on June 12, 2008.

The station was assigned the WQOH call letters by the Federal Communications Commission on June 27, 2008. The station began broadcasting Catholic radio programming on July 21, 2008. The station honored the Blessed Virgin Mary with its call letters standing for "Queen of Heaven." The new owner obtained a construction permit for nighttime operation with the station power reduced to 28 watts.

On December 30, 2014, Queen of Heaven Radio donated WQOH to Divine Word Communications, another Catholic non-profit organization. WQOH, six other stations, and four translators were sold by Divine Word Communications to La Promesa Foundation, effective January 8, 2016. The purchase price was $1,073,907.59. In 2016, the call sign changed to WMMA. The call letters represent the name of the founder of the EWTN Catholic cable service, Mother Mary Angelica. An FM translator was added to allow listeners to tune in on the FM dial. It broadcasts at 97.9 MHz and covers Irondale along with adjacent communities.
