= WLFC =

- North Baltimore, Ohio; United States
- Broadcast area: Findlay, Ohio
- Frequency: 88.3 MHz
- Branding: K-LOVE

Programming
- Format: Contemporary Christian

Ownership
- Owner: The University of Findlay (pending sale to K-Love Inc.)

History
- First air date: November 1, 1973
- Former call signs: WVFC
- Call sign meaning: We Love Findlay College

Technical information
- Licensing authority: FCC
- Facility ID: 21474
- Class: A
- ERP: 4,600 watts
- HAAT: 100.0 meters
- Transmitter coordinates: 41°07′04.00″N 83°32′38.00″W

Links
- Public license information: Public file; LMS
- Webcast: Listen Live
- Website: WLFC 88.3 FM

WLFC (88.3 FM) is a radio station licensed to North Baltimore, Ohio, United States, the station serves The University of Findlay. The station is owned by The University of Findlay.

== History ==
WLFC-FM is a noncommercial radio station that has been serving the people of Hancock County since 1973. The station was begun by business major Bill Rumbold and religion major Stan Morthart and began operating as WVFC during the spring of 1971. At this point, WVFC was a carrier current station available in some residence halls at 560 AM. On November 1, 1973 this station was born and became WLFC-FM and operated at a power of 10 watts on 88.3 MHz. On January 23, 1982 WLFC began operating in stereo at 155 watts ERP. On Oct. 9, 2010 WLFC moved to a new transmitter site, enabling an increase in its power to 4600 watts.

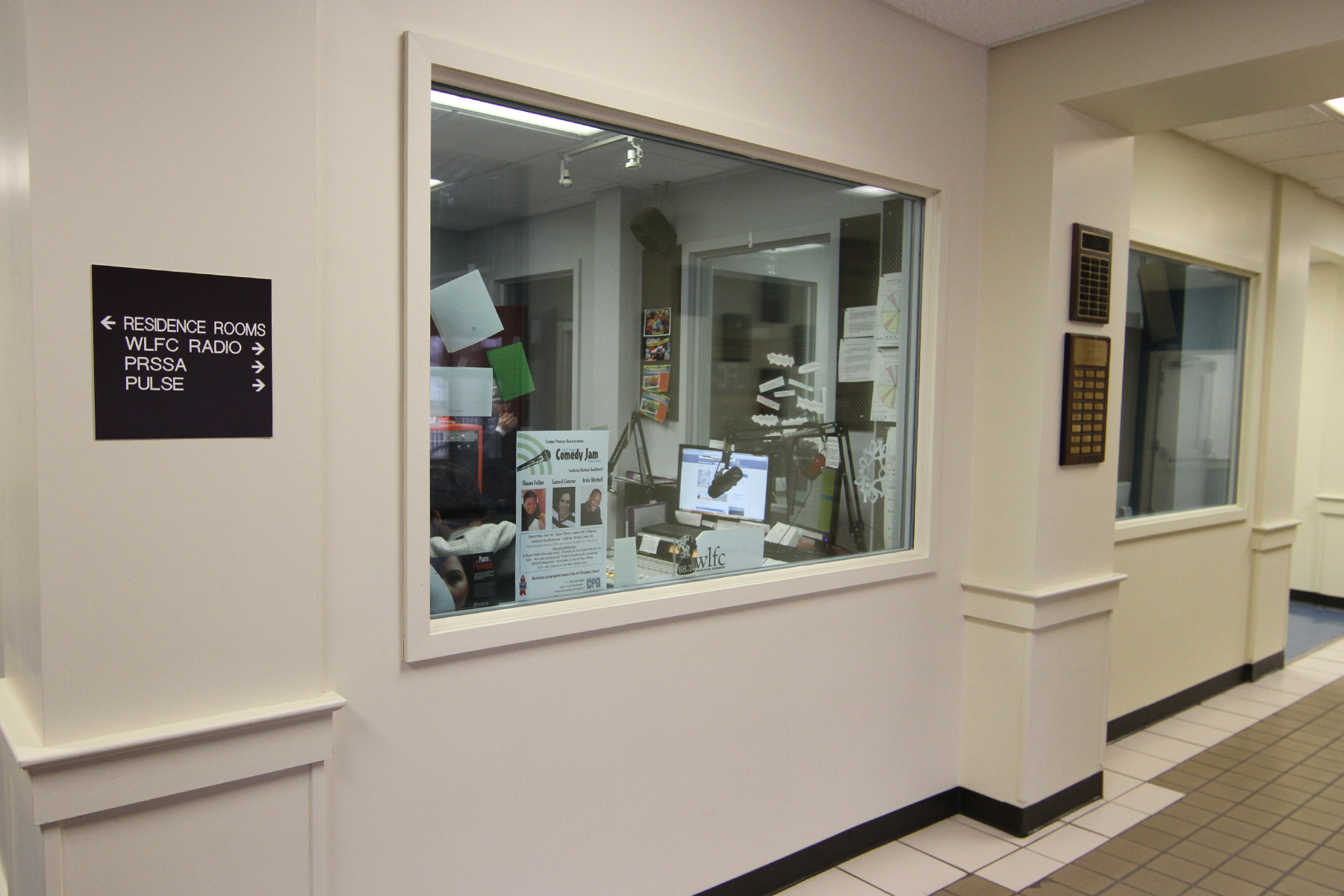
WLFC Studio

The station was began simulcasting programming from K-Love on August 8, 2026 under a Network Affiliation Agreement and was sold to K-Love Inc. by September 18, 2026.
