= KEQQ-LP =

Grand Forks, North Dakota; United States
- Frequency: 88.3 MHz
- Branding: KEQQ Radio

Programming
- Format: Educational talk

Ownership
- Owner: Grand Forks Bible Study Group

History
- First air date: 2014

Technical information
- Licensing authority: FCC
- Facility ID: 195984
- Class: L1
- ERP: 100 watts
- HAAT: 9 metres (30 ft)
- Transmitter coordinates: 47°54′34.9″N 97°03′59.2″W

Links
- Public license information: LMS
- Webcast: Listen Live
- Website: Official Website

KEQQ-LP (88.3 FM) is a radio station licensed to serve the community of Grand Forks, North Dakota. The station is owned by the Grand Forks Bible Study Group. It airs an educational talk radio format.

The station was assigned the KEQQ-LP call letters by the Federal Communications Commission on February 10, 2014.
