= KWIS =

- Plummer, Idaho; United States
- Frequency: 88.3 MHz
- Branding: KWIS 88.3 FM

Programming
- Format: Community radio

Ownership
- Owner: Coeur d'Alene Tribe

Technical information
- Licensing authority: FCC
- Facility ID: 173445
- Class: C3
- ERP: 2,400 watts
- HAAT: 286 metres (938 ft)
- Transmitter coordinates: 47°19′37″N 116°42′55″W

Links
- Public license information: Public file; LMS
- Website: Official Website

KWIS (88.3 FM) is a radio station licensed to serve the community of Plummer, Idaho. The station is owned by the Coeur d'Alene Tribe, and airs a community radio format.

The station was assigned the KWIS call letters by the Federal Communications Commission on December 29, 2008.
