= CFAK-FM =

Campus radio station at the Université de Sherbrooke in Sherbrooke, Quebec, Canada

Coordinates: 45°22′46″N 71°55′16″W

- Sherbrooke, Quebec; Canada
- Frequency: 88.3 MHz

Programming
- Format: campus radio

Ownership
- Owner: Université de Sherbrooke; (Comité de la radio étudiante universitaire de Sherbrooke)

History
- First air date: 2003

Technical information
- Class: A
- ERP: 785 W
- HAAT: 61.2 metres (201 ft)

Links
- Website: cfak.ca

CFAK-FM is a Canadian radio station, broadcasting at 88.3 FM in Sherbrooke, Quebec. It is the campus radio station of the Université de Sherbrooke.

Owned by Comité de la radio étudiante universitaire de Sherbrooke (CREUS), the station received CRTC approval on March 7, 2003.

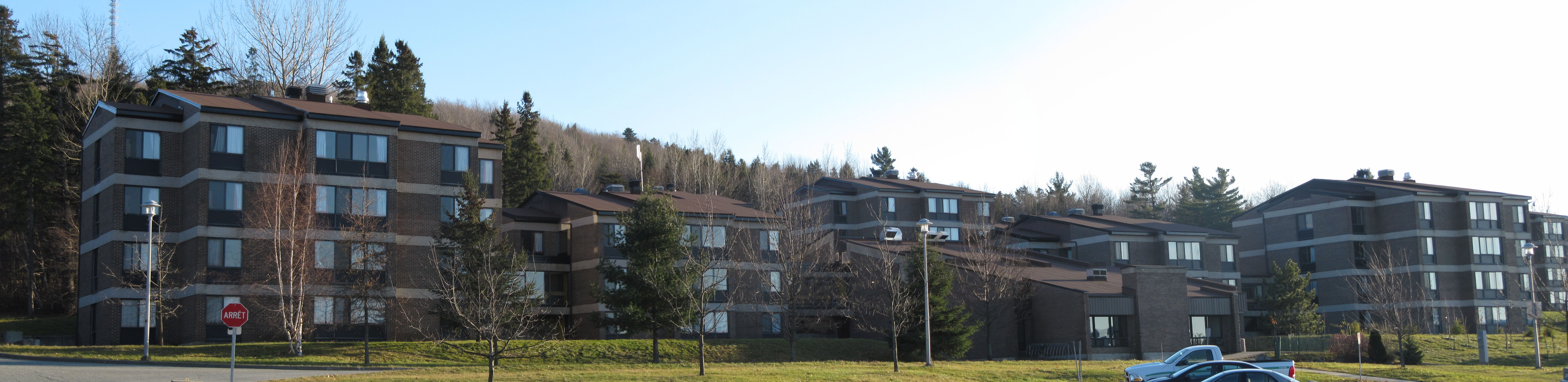
Studios are located inside building G on Université de Sherbrooke main campus.
