= XEPVI-AM =

Radio station in Tepic, Nayarit, Mexico

Xalisco/Tepic, Nayarit; Mexico
- Frequency: 1280 AM
- Branding: Radio Plenitud

Programming
- Format: Defunct

Ownership
- Owner: Casa Apostólica Vida (Plenitud de Vida, A.C.)

History
- First air date: April 24, 2014
- Last air date: July 14, 2017 (surrender of concession)
- Call sign meaning: "Plenitud de Vida"

Technical information
- Power: 1 kW

XEPVI-AM was a radio station on 1280 AM in Tepic, Nayarit. The station was owned by Plenitud de Vida, A.C. for the Casa Apostólica Vida Christian church and known as Radio Plenitud.

== History ==
XEPVI received its permit on March 8, 2010, but it did not sign on until April 24, 2014. The station barely broadcast, as in July 2017, Plenitud de Vida surrendered its permit citing financial difficulties.
