= XHEOO-FM =

Radio station in Tepic, Nayarit

- Tepic, Nayarit; Mexico
- Broadcast area: Tepic, Nayarit
- Frequency: 96.1 FM
- Branding: Love FM

Programming
- Format: Romantic

Ownership
- Owner: Radiorama; (XEOO-AM, S.A. de C.V.)
- Operator: Grupo Audiorama Comunicaciones

History
- First air date: March 15, 1962 (concession)
- Former frequencies: 620 AM

Technical information
- Licensing authority: CRT
- Class: B1
- ERP: 10 kW
- HAAT: 208.9 m (685 ft)
- Transmitter coordinates: 21°30′23″N 104°52′46″W

Links
- Webcast: Listen live
- Website: Radiorama Nayarit Website

XHEOO-FM is a radio station on 96.1 FM in Tepic, Nayarit, Mexico.

== History ==
XHEOO began as XEOO-AM 620, with a concession awarded to José de Jesús Cortés Barbosa on March 15, 1962. The station was sold several times in the 1970s and 1980s: Radio Sultana del Pacífico acquired it in 1971 and sold it to Radio Impulsora del Nayar, S.A., in 1986. By the early 2000s, XEOO had increased its power from 1,000 watts to 5,000 during the day.

On August 12, 2019, Éxtasis Digital moved to XHEOO and Arroba FM moved from 96.1 to XHEPIC-FM 98.5.

The station began airing El Heraldo Radio on August 31, 2020. On April 1, 2022, Heraldo Radio dropped eight stations, including XHEOO, as affiliates. On Monday April 25 the station is launched a Love FM a romantic format.
