= KOUI (FM) =

- Mount Pleasant, Texas; United States
- Broadcast area: Mount Pleasant, Texas
- Frequency: 88.3 MHz

Programming
- Format: Southern Gospel

Ownership
- Owner: Joy Christian Ministries

History
- First air date: March 15, 2011
- Former call signs: KPIP (2008–2010); KYZQ (2010–2023)

Technical information
- Licensing authority: FCC
- Facility ID: 121233
- Class: A
- ERP: 2,200 watts
- HAAT: 63 meters (207 ft)
- Transmitter coordinates: 33°10′10″N 94°57′48″W

Links
- Public license information: Public file; LMS

KOUI (88.3 FM) is a southern gospel radio station licensed to Mount Pleasant, Texas, United States. The station is currently owned by Joy Christian Ministries.

The station was taken silent on February 2, 2020, with the licensee citing financial reasons, and resumed operations on January 26, 2021.

The then-KYZQ was purchased by Joy Christian Ministries from South Central Oklahoma Broadcasting Inc on June 17, 2023. The station changed its call sign to KOUI on July 31, 2023.

== History ==
This station was assigned the call sign KPIP on August 6, 2008, and changed it to KYZQ on July 5, 2010.
