= KKAG (FM) =

- Grangeville, Idaho; United States
- Frequency: 88.3 MHz
- Branding: Retro Radio

Programming
- Format: Oldies

Ownership
- Owner: Calvary Chapel of Grangeville, Inc.

History
- First air date: 2008 (as KKRH)
- Former call signs: KKRH (2008–2009)

Technical information
- Licensing authority: FCC
- Facility ID: 172903
- Class: A
- ERP: 50 watts
- HAAT: 717 metres (2,352 ft)
- Transmitter coordinates: 45°51′48″N 116°07′22″W

Links
- Public license information: Public file; LMS
- Website: kkagretroradio.com

KKAG (88.3 FM) is a radio station licensed to serve the community of Grangeville, Idaho. The station is owned by Calvary Chapel of Grangeville, Inc. It airs an oldies format.

The station was assigned the KKAG call letters by the Federal Communications Commission.
