= XHZE-FM =

Radio station in Santiago Ixcuintla, Nayarit

- Santiago Ixcuintla, Nayarit; Mexico
- Frequency: 92.9 FM
- Branding: La Poderosa

Programming
- Format: Regional Mexican

Ownership
- Owner: Grupo Radiorama; (Radio Nayarita, S.A. de C.V.)

History
- First air date: May 10, 1978
- Call sign meaning: ZEpeda

Technical information
- Licensing authority: CRT
- Class: B1
- ERP: 25 kW
- HAAT: 64.36 m (211.2 ft)
- Transmitter coordinates: 21°48′01″N 105°14′06″W

Links
- Website: radioramanayarit.mx

XHZE-FM is a radio station on 92.9 FM in Santiago Ixcuintla, Nayarit. The station is owned by Grupo Radiorama and carries a Regional Mexican format known as La Poderosa.

== History ==
XHZE began as XEZE-AM 1340, which was later moved to 950. Owned by María Esperanza Cortés de Zepeda, XEZE was authorized on May 10, 1978 and sold to Radio Río, S.A. de C.V., in 1986.

It migrated to FM in 2010 as XHZE-FM on 92.9.
