= WJUV =

- Cullman, Alabama; United States
- Frequency: 88.3 MHz
- Branding: Catholic Radio for Your Soul

Programming
- Language: English
- Format: Catholic Radio
- Affiliations: EWTN

Ownership
- Owner: La Promesa Foundation
- Sister stations: WMMA-AM & WQOH-FM

History
- First air date: April 2011

Technical information
- Licensing authority: FCC
- Facility ID: 177361
- Class: A
- ERP: 88 watts (vertical)
- HAAT: 95 meters (312 ft)
- Transmitter coordinates: 34°12′20″N 86°45′00″W

Links
- Public license information: Public file; LMS
- Website: http://www.grnonline.com

WJUV (88.3 FM) is an American radio station licensed to serve the community of Cullman, the county seat of Cullman County, Alabama. The station, established in 2011, is owned by La Promesa Foundation.

== Programming ==
WJUV normally broadcasts an English-language Christian radio format.

== History ==
In October 2007, Centro Comunitario Juvenil Mahanaim, Inc., of Seattle, Washington, applied to the Federal Communications Commission (FCC) for a construction permit for a new broadcast radio station. The FCC granted this permit on April 18, 2008 with a scheduled expiration date of April 18, 2011. The new station was assigned call sign "WJUV" on December 21, 2010. After construction and testing were completed, the station was granted its broadcast license on April 18, 2011.

Two weeks after the station began broadcasting, the WJUV studio building was destroyed by an EF4 tornado during the 2011 Super Outbreak. With the tower damaged and the studios wrecked, the station's signal went dark. WJUV management notified the FCC of their silent state in May 2011 and requested special temporary authority to remain silent until technical issues could be resolved. The commission granted this authority on July 18, 2011, with a scheduled expiration of January 15, 2012.

WJUV was sold to Gene and Jeaniene Church's Divine Word Communications, Inc. effective April 1, 2013. The price for the transaction was $50,000. Subsequently, WJUV, six other stations, and four translators were sold to La Promesa Foundation effective January 8, 2016, at a purchase price of $1,073,907.59.
