= XHERIO-FM =

Radio station in Ixtlán del Río, Nayarit

- Ixtlán del Río, Nayarit; Mexico
- Frequency: 106.9 FM
- Branding: Radio Sensación

Programming
- Format: Regional Mexican

Ownership
- Owner: Grupo Radiorama; (XERIO-AM, S.A. de C.V.)

History
- First air date: February 2, 1976 (concession); 2010 (FM)
- Call sign meaning: Ixtlán del RÍO

Technical information
- Licensing authority: CRT
- Class: B1
- ERP: 25 kW
- HAAT: −68.4 m (−224 ft)
- Transmitter coordinates: 21°01′28″N 104°23′09″W

Links
- Website: radioramanayarit.mx

XHERIO-FM is a radio station on 106.9 FM in Ixtlán del Río, Nayarit. XHERIO is owned by Grupo Radiorama and carries a Regional Mexican format known as Radio Sensación.

== History ==
XHERIO began as XERIO-AM 1560, awarded in 1976 to José de Jesús Cortés de Barbosa. It was later sold to Radio Río, S.A. de C.V.

In 2005, XERIO was moved to 1050 kHz, and in 2010, it migrated to FM on 106.9 MHz.
