= KBKO (FM) =

- Kodiak, Alaska; United States
- Frequency: 88.3 MHz
- Branding: Sacred Heart Radio

Programming
- Format: Catholic radio
- Affiliations: Ave Maria Radio, EWTN

Ownership
- Owner: Sacred Heart Radio, Inc.

History
- Former call signs: KZXD (2011–2012)

Technical information
- Licensing authority: FCC
- Facility ID: 177368
- Class: A
- ERP: 100 watts
- HAAT: −8 metres (−26 ft)
- Transmitter coordinates: 57°48′37.3″N 152°21′47.8″W

Links
- Public license information: Public file; LMS
- Webcast: Listen live
- Website: sacredheartradio.org

KBKO (88.3 FM, "Sacred Heart Radio") is a radio station licensed to serve the community of Kodiak, Alaska. The station is owned by Sacred Heart Radio, Inc. It airs a Catholic radio format.

The station was assigned the call sign KZXD by the Federal Communications Commission on May 2, 2011. The station changed its call sign to KBKO to June 18, 2012.
