= KJTS =

- New Ulm, Minnesota; United States
- Frequency: 88.3 MHz
- Branding: Kinship Christian Radio

Programming
- Format: Christian Radio

Ownership
- Owner: Minn-Iowa Christian Broadcasting, Inc.

History
- Call sign meaning: Know Jesus The Savior

Technical information
- Licensing authority: FCC
- Facility ID: 90944
- Class: A
- ERP: 2,400 watts
- HAAT: 29 meters (95 ft)
- Transmitter coordinates: 44°16′07″N 94°26′21″W

Links
- Public license information: Public file; LMS
- Webcast: Listen live
- Website: kinshipradio.org/home/

KJTS is a Christian radio station licensed to New Ulm, Minnesota, broadcasting on 88.3 MHz. The station is owned by Minn-Iowa Christian Broadcasting, Inc.
