= KJGT =

Christian radio station in Waconia, Minnesota

Coordinates: 44°47′20″N 93°54′27″W

- Waconia, Minnesota; United States
- Broadcast area: West suburban Minneapolis-St. Paul; McLeod County
- Frequency: 88.3 MHz

Programming
- Format: Christian

Ownership
- Owner: Minn-Iowa Christian Broadcasters

Technical information
- Licensing authority: FCC
- Facility ID: 172741
- Class: C3
- ERP: 11,000 watts
- HAAT: 86 meters (282 ft)
- Translators: 91.5 K218DK (Bloomington); 106.5 K293BA (Elko)

Links
- Public license information: Public file; LMS
- Webcast: Listen live
- Website: https://kinshipradio.org/home/

KJGT (88.3 FM) is a radio station licensed to Waconia, Minnesota. KJGT airs a Christian format and is owned by Minn-Iowa Christian Broadcasters.
