= XHNF-FM =

Radio station in Tepic, Nayarit

- Tepic, Nayarit; Mexico
- Frequency: 97.7 FM
- Branding: La Nayarita

Programming
- Format: Regional Mexican

Ownership
- Owner: Radiorama; (XHNF, S.A. de C.V.)

History
- First air date: March 25, 1976 (concession)

Technical information
- Licensing authority: CRT
- Class: B
- ERP: 24 kW
- HAAT: 210.4 m (690 ft)

Links
- Website: lanayarita977.com

XHNF-FM is a radio station on 97.7 FM in Tepic, Nayarit. The station is owned by Radiorama and is known as La Nayarita with regional mexican format.

== History ==
XHNF began with a concession awarded to José de Jesús Cortés Barbosa on March 25, 1976, making it one of Nayarit's first FM stations. The station was sold to Radio Impulsora del Nayar, S.A., in 1988 and later to its current concessionaire.

Until 2016, XHNF was known as "Ráfaga", a unique name used on only a handful of Radiorama stations in Sinaloa and Nayarit. It then became La Nayarita.
