= XHPNA-FM =

Radio station in Tepic, Nayarit, Mexico

- Tepic, Nayarit; Mexico
- Frequency: 101.9 FM
- Branding: Romántica

Programming
- Format: Romantic

Ownership
- Owner: Grupo Radiorama; (XEPNA-AM, S.A. de C.V.)

History
- First air date: November 30, 1994 (concession)
- Former call signs: XEPNA-AM
- Former frequencies: 1590 kHz, 890 kHz

Technical information
- Licensing authority: CRT
- Class: B
- ERP: 10 kW
- HAAT: 237.51 m (779.2 ft)
- Transmitter coordinates: 21°31′23″N 104°55′26″W

Links
- Webcast: Listen live
- Website: radioramanayarit.mx

XHPNA-FM is a radio station on 101.9 FM in Tepic, Nayarit, Mexico. The station is owned by Grupo Radiorama and carries its Romántica romantic music format.

== History ==
XEPNA-AM 1590 received its concession on November 30, 1994. It was owned by Grupo Radiorama from the start but soon moved to 890 kHz.
