= 90.3 FM =

FM radio frequency

The following radio stations broadcast on FM frequency 90.3 MHz:

== Hong Kong ==
- Commercial Radio Hong Kong CR2 FM 90.3

== Argentina ==
- 90.3 Tolhuin in Tolhuin, Tierra del Fuego
- 903 Radio in Rosario de Lerma, Salta
- Cielo in San Rafael, Mendoza
- Delta in Buenos Aires
- Estilo in Villa Mercedes, San Luis
- FM Victoria in Victoria, Entre Ríos
- Familia in Monte Chingolo, Buenos Aires
- Granadero in General Rodríguez, Buenos Aires
- Identidad Nacional in Tucumán
- La Voz de Cuyo in San Luis
- LRF942 de los cerros in Lago Puelo, Chubut
- MEGA in Bell Ville, Córdoba
- Net Classic in San Lorenzo, Santa Fe
- Oíd Rock in Rio Colorado, Río Negro
- Oliva in Rosario, Santa Fe
- Popular in General Roca, Rio Negro
- Power in La Rioja
- Radio 3 in Rivera, Buenos Aires
- Radio María in Machagai, Chaco
- Radio María in Justiniano Posse, Córdoba
- Radio María in San Francisco, Córdoba
- Radio María in Añatuya, Santiago del Estero
- Radio María in Ingeniero Jacobacci, Río Negro
- Radio María in San Carlos Centro, Santa Fe
- Radio Victoria in Victoria
- Rey de Reyes in Rosario, Santa Fe
- Soho in San Nicolás de los Arroyos, Buenos Aires

== Australia ==
- 2KY in Dubbo, New South Wales
- ABC Goulburn Murray in Goulburn, New South Wales
- 2MWM in Sydney, New South Wales
- 90.3 ABC Sunshine Coast in Sunshine Coast, Queensland
- Triple J in Bendigo, Victoria
- Vision Radio Network in Sale, Victoria
- 5SSA in Adelaide, South Australia

== Canada (Channel 212) ==
- CBAF-FM-18 in Lameque, New Brunswick
- CBCR-FM in Kirkland Lake, Ontario
- CBEC-FM in Elliot Lake, Ontario
- CBEG-FM in Sarnia, Ontario
- CBNM-FM in Marystown, Newfoundland and Labrador
- CBO-FM-1 in Belleville, Ontario
- CBON-FM-26 in Hearst, Ontario
- CBPI-FM in Waterton Park, Alberta
- CBTV-FM in Valemount, British Columbia
- CBU-FM-5 in Prince George, British Columbia
- CBVC-FM in Chibougamau, Quebec
- CHYH-FM in Taloyoak, Nunavut
- CIDV-FM in Drayton Valley, Alberta
- CIQI-FM in Montmagny, Quebec
- CJAT-FM-1 in Castlegar, British Columbia
- CJBC-FM in Toronto, Ontario
- CJLR-FM-4 in Regina, Saskatchewan
- CKMP-FM in Calgary, Alberta
- CKRP-FM-2 in Peace River, Alberta
- CKUT-FM in Montreal, Quebec
- VF2317 in Blue River, British Columbia
- VF2461 in Ymir, British Columbia

== China ==
- CNR Business Radio in Lanzhou

== Germany ==
- NDR 90,3 in Hamburg

== Hungary ==
- Tilos Rádió in Budapest

== Japan ==
- RNC Radio in Takamatsu, Kagawa

== Lithuania ==
- Rock FM in Kaunas

== Malaysia ==
- Era in Malacca & North Johor
- TraXX FM in Kuala Lumpur & Labuan

== Mexico ==
- XHBP-FM in Gómez Palacio, Durango
- XHEMIA-FM in Guadalajara, Jalisco
- XHFCS-FM in Culiacán, Sinaloa
- XHGD-FM in Hidalgo del Parral, Chihuahua
- XHITZ-FM in Tijuana, Baja California
- XHJPA-FM in Jojutla, Morelos
- XHML-FM in León, Guanajuato
- XHPAPA-FM in Papantla de Olarte, Veracruz
- XHPVA-FM in Puerto Vallarta, Jalisco
- XHQS-FM in Fresnillo, Zacatecas
- XHTG-FM in Tuxtla Gutiérrez, Chiapas
- XHXW-FM in Nogales, Sonora

== New Zealand ==
- Akaroa Radio in Akaroa, Canterbury
- Coast FM in Reefton, West Coast
- The Hits in Masterton, Wellington
- More FM in Whitianga, Waikato
- More FM in Paraparaumu, Wellington
- More FM in Alexandra, Otago
- Newstalk ZB in Napier and Hastings, Hawkes Bay
- RNZ Concert in Rotorua, Bay of Plenty

== Philippines ==
- DWKT in Dagupan
- DWMZ in Lucena
- DWMY in Naga, Camarines Sur
- DYCP in Bacolod
- DYAJ in Ormoc
- DXAH in General Santos
- DXCH in Kidapawan
- DXGJ in Digos
- DXKI-FM in Cagayan de Oro

== United States (Channel 212) ==
- KABA in Louise, Texas
- KAIS in Salem, Oregon
- KANM in Grants, New Mexico
- KANQ in Chanute, Kansas
- KASD in Rapid City, South Dakota
- KAZU in Pacific Grove, California
- KBJS in Jacksonville, Texas
- KBMH in Holbrook, Arizona
- KBSU in Boise, Idaho
- KBUB in Brownwood, Texas
- KBUT in Crested Butte, Colorado
- KBUZ in Topeka, Kansas
- KCAV in Marshall, Arkansas
- KCCD in Moorhead, Minnesota
- KCIF in Hilo, Hawaii
- KCKE in Chillicothe, Missouri
- KCRL in Sunrise Beach, Missouri
- KCSP in Casper, Wyoming
- KCTZ in San Lucas, California
- KDTI in Rochester Hills, Michigan
- KDVS in Davis, California
- KEDM in Monroe, Louisiana
- KEDT in Corpus Christi, Texas
- KEDV in Brackettville, Texas
- KELU in Clovis, New Mexico
- KEXP in Seattle, Washington
- KFAI in Minneapolis, Minnesota
- KFFP-LP in Portland, Oregon
- KFLR in Phoenix, Arizona
- KFNO in Fresno, California
- KFXY in Buena Vista, Colorado
- KGCD (FM) in Wray, Colorado
- KGSP in Parkville, Missouri
- KHEV in Fairview, Oklahoma
- KHRM in Round Mountain, Nevada
- KIAO in Delta Junction, Alaska
- KJFT (FM) in Arlee, Montana
- KJSD in Watertown, South Dakota
- KLAI in Laytonville, California
- KLCU in Ardmore, Oklahoma
- KLFS in Van Buren, Arkansas
- KLFV in Grand Junction, Colorado
- KLGU in Saint George, Utah
- KLIE-LP in Fountain Valley, California
- KLON in Tillamook, Oregon
- KLUH in Poplar Bluff, Missouri
- KLWO in Longview, Washington
- KLXC in Carlsbad, New Mexico
- KMGT in Circle, Montana
- KMKL (FM) in North Branch, Minnesota
- KMNE in Bassett, Nebraska
- KMRO in Camarillo, California
- KMZO in Hamilton, Montana
- KNAG in Grand Canyon, Arizona
- KNBA in Anchorage, Alaska
- KNLG in New Bloomfield, Missouri
- KNWY in Yakima, Washington
- KOSC in San Francisco, California
- KPDR in Wheeler, Texas
- KPKW in Susanville, California
- KPOR in Welches, Oregon
- KQOW in Bellingham, Washington
- KRFP in Moscow, Idaho
- KRNU in Lincoln, Nebraska
- KSLC in Mcminnville, Oregon
- KSLP in Fort Pierre, South Dakota
- KSXT in Smiley, Texas
- KTVR in La Grande, Oregon
- KUWJ in Jackson, Wyoming
- KVLA-FM in Coachella, California
- KVRS in Lawton, Oklahoma
- KWBP (FM) in Big Pine, California
- KWIT in Sioux City, Iowa
- KWUR in Clayton, Missouri
- KWYC in Orchard Valley, Wyoming
- KYLC in Lake Charles, Louisiana
- KYRQ in Natalia, Texas
- KYUK-FM in Bethel, Alaska
- KZBN in Bozeman, Montana
- KZJB in Pocatello, Idaho
- WAEF in Cordele, Georgia
- WAIJ in Grantsville, Maryland
- WAMC in Albany, New York
- WAMF-LP in New Orleans, Louisiana
- WARC (FM) in Meadville, Pennsylvania
- WBCL in Fort Wayne, Indiana
- WBCR in Beloit, Wisconsin
- WBHM in Birmingham, Alabama
- WBLV in Twin Lake, Michigan
- WBRH in Baton Rouge, Louisiana
- WCDN-FM in Ridgebury, Pennsylvania
- WCLV in Cleveland, Ohio
- WCSK in Kingsport, Tennessee
- WDIH in Salisbury, Maryland
- WDYF in Dothan, Alabama
- WEJF in Palm Bay, Florida
- WESS in East Stroudsburg, Pennsylvania
- WEVF in Colebrook, New Hampshire
- WFHE in Hickory, North Carolina
- WFOF in Covington, Indiana
- WHBM in Park Falls, Wisconsin
- WHCJ in Savannah, Georgia
- WHCR in New York, New York
- WHLA (FM) in La Crosse, Wisconsin
- WHPC in Garden City, New York
- WHRO in Norfolk, Virginia
- WIGW in Eustis, Florida
- WJLH in Flagler Beach, Florida
- WJTL in Lancaster, Pennsylvania
- WJVM in Bellefonte, Pennsylvania
- WJWD in Marshall, Wisconsin
- WJWR in Bloomington, Illinois
- WKCD in Cedarville, Ohio
- WKIH in Twin City, Georgia
- WKJD in Columbus, Indiana
- WKNJ in Union Township, New Jersey
- WKNS in Kinston, North Carolina
- WKRB in Brooklyn, New York
- WKWC in Owensboro, Kentucky
- WLHI in Schnecksville, Pennsylvania
- WLVF in Haines City, Florida
- WLTM in Harrisburg, Illinois
- WLXZ in Pinehurst, North Carolina
- WMAH in Biloxi, Mississippi
- WMAV in Oxford, Mississippi
- WMKY in Morehead, Kentucky
- WMSC in Upper Montclair, New Jersey
- WMSH (FM) in Sparta, Illinois
- WNEQ in Taylortown, New Jersey
- WNJO (FM) in Toms River, New Jersey
- WNJZ in Cape May Court House, New Jersey
- WOKG in Galax, Virginia
- WOTL in Toledo, Ohio
- WPLN in Nashville, Tennessee
- WQUB in Quincy, Illinois
- WQXW in Ossining, New York
- WRBK in Richburg, South Carolina
- WRIU in Kingston, Rhode Island
- WRPR in Mahwah, New Jersey
- WRST in Oshkosh, Wisconsin
- WRUN in Remsen, New York
- WRVD in Syracuse, New York
- WRXT in Roanoke, Virginia
- WSSB in Orangeburg, South Carolina
- WUIT-LP in Durham, North Carolina
- WUSI (FM) in Olney, Illinois
- WUTK in Knoxville, Tennessee
- WUTM in Martin, Tennessee
- WVID in Anasco, Puerto Rico
- WVIK in Rock Island, Illinois
- WVPG in Parkersburg, West Virginia
- WVPH in Piscataway, New Jersey
- WWPT in Westport, Connecticut
- WWQD in Dekalb, Mississippi
- WWQW in Wartburg, Tennessee
- WWQY in Yadkin, North Carolina
- WXBP in Corinth, Maine
- WXDM in Front Royal, Virginia
- WXXY in Houghton, New York
- WYBP in Fort Lauderdale, Florida
- WYJC in Greenville, Florida
- WZBC in Newton, Massachusetts
