= List of radio stations in Zacatecas =

This is a list of CRT-licensed radio stations in the Mexican state of Zacatecas, which can be sorted by their call signs, frequencies, location, ownership, names, and programming formats.

Radio stations in Zacatecas
Call sign	Frequency	Location	Owner	Name	Format
XECCBS-AM	610 AM	Fresnillo–Zacatecas	TV Zac, S.A. de C.V.	Ke Buena	Regional Mexican
XECCCN-AM	640 AM	Lomas de Calera	TV Zac, S.A. de C.V.	La Q	Adult contemporary
XEMA-AM (Note: Linked to XHEMA-FM, which must keep XEMA-AM on the air until there are no listeners in its service area unserved by other radio stations.)	690 AM	Buena Vista de Rivera (Fresnillo)	Frecuencia Azul, S.A. de C.V.	La Mejor	Regional Mexican
XEJAGC-AM	720 AM	Juan Aldama	Jorge Armando García Calderón	La Bonita del Norte	Regional Mexican
XEFRTM-AM	770 AM	Fresnillo–Zacatecas	Transmisiones Mik, S.A. de C.V.	W Radio	News/talk
XECCSZ-AM	830 AM	Sombrerete	TV Zac, S.A. de C.V.	—N/a	—N/a
XECCCG-AM	1020 AM	Cañitas de Felipe Pescador	TV Zac, S.A. de C.V.	W Radio	News/talk
XETGO-AM	1100 AM	Guadalupe Victoria	Radio Alegría de Tlaltenango, S.A. de C.V.	Ke Buena	Regional Mexican
XECSEZ-AM	1330 AM	Jalpa	Fernando Díaz Alonso	—N/a	—N/a
XECCJZ-AM	1420 AM	Jalpa	Arturo Emilio Zorrilla Ibarra	—N/a	—N/a
XHCCCX-FM	88.1 FM	Cañitas de Felipe Pescador	TV Zac, S.A. de C.V.	Ke Buena	Regional Mexican
XHCPFG-FM	88.3 FM	Zacatecas	Sistema Público de Radiodifusión del Estado Mexicano	—N/a	—N/a
XHXM-FM	89.1 FM	Jerez de García Salinas	Arnoldo Rodríguez Zermeño	Radio Jerez	
XHEPC-FM	89.9 FM	Zacatecas	Sonido Estrella, S.A. de C.V.	Sonido Estrella	
XHCCFC-FM	90.1 FM	Concepción del Oro	Social Media Coahuila, S.A. de C.V.	Región 90.1	Pop
XHTGO-FM	90.1 FM	Guadalupe Victoria	Radio Alegría de Tlaltenango, S.A. de C.V.	Ke Buena	Regional Mexican
XHQS-FM	90.3 FM	Fresnillo	Romántica 90.3, S.A. de C.V.	Romántica 90.3	Romantic
XHJRZ-FM	90.7 FM	Jerez de García Salinas	Arnoldo Rodríguez Zermeño	Inolvidable	
XHPSTZ-FM	90.7 FM	Somberete	Jorge Armando García Calderón	La Bonita del Norte	Regional Mexican
XHCCFD-FM	90.9 FM	Concepción del Oro	Nova Teleradio, S.A. de C.V.	Región 90.9	Regional Mexican
XHRRA-FM	91.1 FM	Fresnillo	Josefina Reyes Sahagún	Estéreo Fresnillo	
XHZTS-FM	91.5 FM	Zacatecas	Juan Enríquez Rivera	Estéreo Plata	
XHCSHZ-FM	91.7 FM	Tlaltenango de Sánchez Román	Aranza Contrapunto, A.C.	—N/a	—N/a
XHCCFE-FM	91.9 FM	Fresnillo	TV Zac, S.A. de C.V.	Ke Buena	Regional Mexican
XHPSBZ-FM	92.3 FM	Sombrerete	TV Zac, S.A. de C.V.	Ke Buena	Regional Mexican
XHPRGZ-FM	92.7 FM	Río Grande	Jorge Armando García Calderón	La Bonita del Norte	Regional Mexican
XHCCFJ-FM	92.9 FM	Valparaíso	TV Zac, S.A. de C.V.	Ke Buena	Regional Mexican
XHEXZ-FM	93.3 FM	Zacatecas	Raza Publicidad, S.A. de C.V.	Lupe 93.3	
XHCCFH-FM	93.5 FM	Miguel Auza	TV Zac, S.A. de C.V.	—N/a	—N/a
XHCCCY-FM	94.3 FM	Chalchihuites	TV Zac, S.A. de C.V.	—N/a	—N/a
XHPFRZ-FM	94.3 FM	Fresnillo	TV Zac, S.A. de C.V.	W Radio	News/talk
XHGAP-FM	94.7 FM	Guadalupe	Juan Enríquez Rivera	La Súper G	
XHEL-FM	95.1 FM	Fresnillo	Sucesión de Juana Gallegos Rojas	La Ele FM	
XHJRS-FM	95.1 FM	Jalpa	Josefina Reyes Sahagún	Radio Caxcan	
XHZTZ-FM	95.5 FM	Zacatecas	Fomento Educativo y Cultural Francisco de Ibarra, A.C.	Lobos FM	University radio
XHGPE-FM	96.1 FM	Guadalupe	Rate Cultural y Educativa de México, A.C.	La Voz 96.1 FM	News/talk
XHZER-FM	96.5 FM	Zacatecas	Arnoldo Rodríguez Zermeño	Stereo Zer	Regional Mexican
XHZC-FM	97.1 FM	Río Grande	Radiodifusoras de Zacatecas, S.A.	La Grande de Río Grande	
XHCCFF-FM	97.5 FM	Fresnillo–Estación San José	Carolina Calderón Badillo	—N/a	—N/a
XHCSHX-FM	97.5 FM	Juan Aldama	Aranza Contrapunto, A.C.	—N/a	—N/a
XHZH-FM	97.9 FM	Zacatecas	Gobierno del Estado de Zacatecas	Radio Zacatecas	Public radio
XHFP-FM	98.3 FM	Jalpa	Comunicación Instantánea, S.A. de C.V.	Radio Alegría	
XHYQ-FM	98.5 FM	Fresnillo	Ralla Zacatecana, S.A. de C.V.	La Tremenda	Regional Mexican
XHPRIO-FM	98.7 FM	Rio Grande	TV Zac, S.A. de C.V.	Ke Buena	Regional Mexican
XHESP-FM	98.9 FM	Mazapil	Estéreo Peñasquito, A.C.	Radio Peñasco	Full-service (mining)
XHCCFI-FM	99.1 FM	Sain Alto	TV Zac, S.A. de C.V.	—N/a	—N/a
XHZAZ-FM	99.3 FM	Zacatecas	XEZAZ-AM, S.A. de C.V.	Amor es 99.3	Romantic
XHCSHY-FM	99.5 FM	Río Grande	Aranza Contrapunto, A.C.	—N/a	—N/a
XHCSHW-FM	99.7 FM	Fresnillo–Plateros	Aranza Contrapunto, A.C.	—N/a	—N/a
XHSCDP-FM	99.9 FM	Tacoaleche–Guadalupe	Agencia de Desarrollo Local de Tacoaleche, A.C.	—N/a	—N/a
XHFRE-FM	100.5 FM	Fresnillo	La Primera FM, S.A. de C.V.	Exa FM	Pop
XHPORO-FM	101.3 FM	Concepcion del Oro	TV Zac, S.A. de C.V.	Ke Buena	Regional Mexican
XHCCFK-FM	102.1 FM	Villanueva	TV Zac, S.A. de C.V.	—N/a	—N/a
XHPINO-FM	102.5 FM	Pinos	TV Zac, S.A. de C.V.	Ke Buena	Regional Mexican
XHIH-FM	103.3 FM	Fresnillo	Sucesión de Juana Gallegos Rojas	La Única	
XHPJAL-FM	103.9 FM	Jalpa	TV Zac, S.A. de C.V.	Ke Buena	Regional Mexican
XHCCFL-FM	104.9 FM	Zacatecas–Guadalupe	TV Zac, S.A. de C.V.	W Radio	News/talk
XHPBNM-FM	104.9 FM	Nochistlán de Mejia	Radio de Ayuda, A.C.		
XHCCFG-FM	105.7 FM	Juan Aldama	TV Zac, S.A. de C.V.	—N/a	—N/a
XHLK-FM	106.5 FM	Zacatecas	Radio Publicidad Zacatecana, S.A. de C.V.	Digital 106.5	Pop
XHSCIG-FM	106.7 FM	Río Grande	Televisión Rural Río Grande, A.C.	StereoRío	Community radio
XHEMA-FM	107.9 FM	Buena Vista de Rivera (Fresnillo)	Frecuencia Azul, S.A. de C.V.	La Mejor	Regional Mexican
