= Villa Insurgentes =

Town of Mexico

Villa Insurgentes El Calabazal
- Town
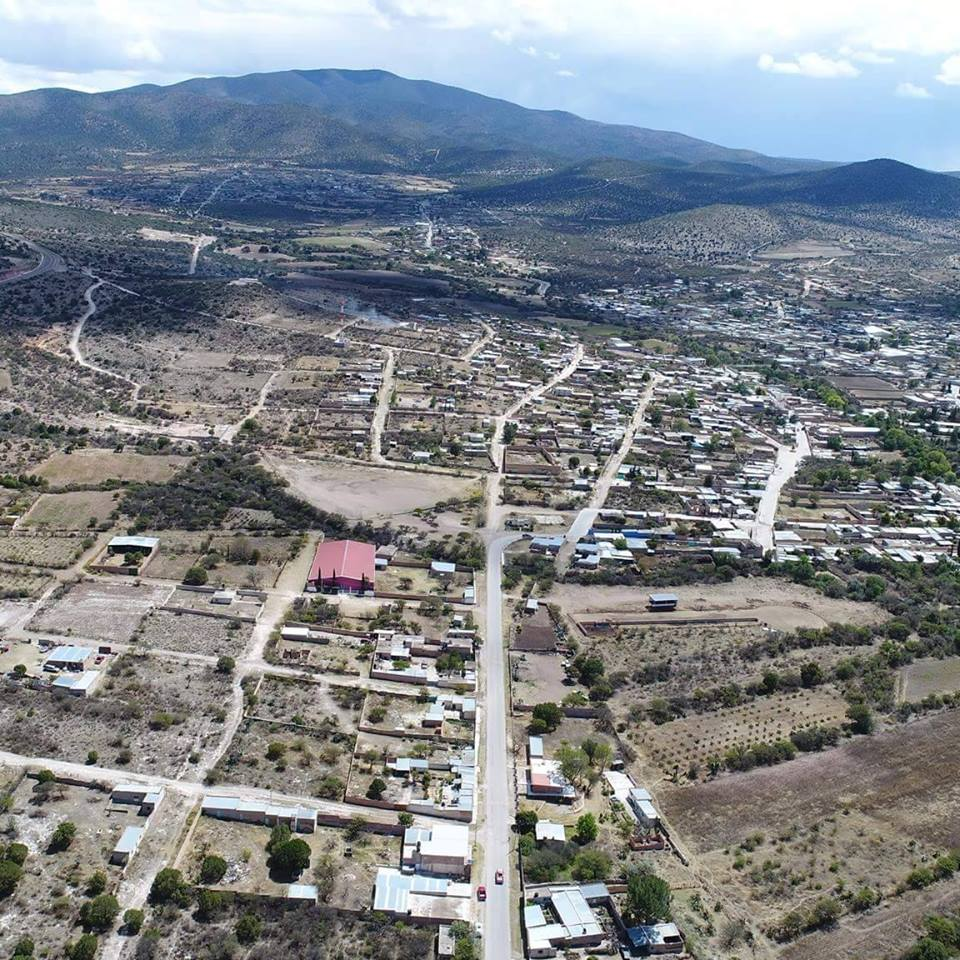
- Nickname: Calabacenses
- Motto: growing community
- Location within Zacatecas Location within Mexico
- Coordinates: 23.740278°N 103.839167°W
- Country: Mexico
- Largest City: Villa Insurgentes
- Municipalities: 39
- Admission: 1595
- Order: 17th
- Founder: José de salas, Bernardino de sala y Andrea Rodríguez

Government
  - Municipal Delegate: Yolanda Serrano 2024-Presente
  - commissar: S/N
- Elevation: 2,150 m (7,050 ft)

Population (2010)
  - Total: 2,837
  - Density: 16/km^{2} (41/sq mi)

Villa Insurgentes, better known as (El Calabazal) is a town located in the municipality of Sombrerete (in the state of Zacatecas). There are 2,837 inhabitants; it is 2150 meters in elevation. The area around Villa Insurgentes has a small population, with 16 people per square kilometer. The nearest city is Vicente Guerrero 14.5 km west.

== History ==
The town of El Calabazal was founded in the year 1555 – 1595 by a group of Realists led by Juan de Salas and Bernardino de Salas at an important time in Zacateca's history. It's unknown if the two men were related.

Bearing the image of Saint Joseph (San José in Spanish), the Cristelos founded the church between 1801 and 1818. The roof of the stone church was supported with pines cut from the hill, harvested by the community with their own hands. They also created the first cemetery in the municipality of Sombrerete.

In 1975 the former archbishop of Duran Mons, Antonio López Aviña, expanded the San José del Calabazal Parish (Saint Joseph Calabazal Parish) which was very small. To not destroy the old parish, he added it to the existing one.

There is an old cross on the top of the hill, placed there in 1940, named De la Santa Cruz Misionera because it was blessed by a Missionary priest who came to town. There is an annual celebration on the 22nd of May with a traditional dance, mañanitas and a relic in the Parras neighborhood.

In 1972 another holy cross was made in the neighborhood of La Laguna which is celebrated by the masons of the community on the 2nd of May with dancing, gunpowder, a relic, mass, and praying of the rosary.

Christ the King was made by a priest, son of a defender of the faith, Pablo Aurelio, September 20, 1961. Every year they celebrate that day with music, mass, rockets. By the year of 1952 the name of the community was changed to 'Villa Insurgentes' , which is what it currently has.

Pantheon (Old) is the oldest pantheon in Villa Insurgentes according to the tomas, the oldest is by María de los Ángeles Ibarra de Saucedo who died on December 8, 1910. Although it cannot be older since they took out the dead to put New bodies

=== Culture and holidays ===
A party is held every year employer in honor of San José starting on March 10 and ending on 22 March. It begins with the pilgrimage for nine days with floats, dance, rosary and mass. On March 17, the coronation of the queen, charreada and colleague is made. On the 19th, the mornings are made in addition to dance, mass, rosary, dance, coleaderos, horseback riding, gunpowder, relic, mechanical games and vintage stalls. In Holy Week a traditional viacrucis is made from San José del Calabazal Parish to the Holy Missionary Cross where it is crucified Jesus of Nazareth. In the town and the neighboring communities that compose it there is an image of Santo Niño de Atocha created in the town of Villa Insurgentes since March 19, 1993. house by house 365 days a year where a rosary is made and people are given a relic. As the parties approach in the city of Plateros, Fresnillo, people come with the same image that walks through the houses to the Sanctuary of Plateros which is a Catholic sanctuary of Mexico where the small image of Santo Niño de Atocha is venerated. Plateros is 5 km from Fresnillo, Zacatecas, only separated by the Mexico – Ciudad Juárez highway.

== Religion ==
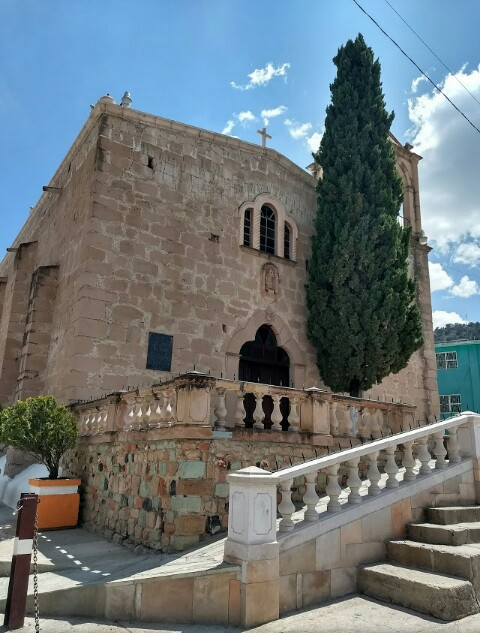
San José del Calabazal

As of 2016, Catholics form 75% of the community. Villa Insurgentes is the seat of the Catholic diocese. The first church of Villa Insurgentes is San José del Calabazal Parish Church which is located on the Avenue Moleros.

=== Other religions ===
- Baptists 5%
- Judaism 2%
- Buddhists 3%
- Jehovah's Witnesses 5%
- Satanic 5%
- No beliefs 3%
- Other 2%

== Climate ==
The weather in the city of Villa Insurgentes El Calabazal is cool most of the year.

Climate data for Villa Insurgentes (1951–2010)
| Month | Jan | Feb | Mar | Apr | May | Jun | Jul | Aug | Sep | Oct | Nov | Dec | Year |
|---|---|---|---|---|---|---|---|---|---|---|---|---|---|
| Record high °C (°F) | 29.0 (84.2) | 32.0 (89.6) | 33.0 (91.4) | 36.0 (96.8) | 37.0 (98.6) | 37.5 (99.5) | 38.0 (100.4) | 37.8 (100.0) | 34.0 (93.2) | 34.0 (93.2) | 31.0 (87.8) | 29.0 (84.2) | 38.0 (100.4) |
| Mean daily maximum °C (°F) | 19.6 (67.3) | 21.4 (70.5) | 24.4 (75.9) | 27.1 (80.8) | 29.3 (84.7) | 28.5 (83.3) | 25.8 (78.4) | 25.2 (77.4) | 24.2 (75.6) | 23.7 (74.7) | 22.5 (72.5) | 19.8 (67.6) | 24.3 (75.7) |
| Daily mean °C (°F) | 11.5 (52.7) | 12.8 (55.0) | 15.4 (59.7) | 18.1 (64.6) | 20.4 (68.7) | 20.8 (69.4) | 19.2 (66.6) | 18.9 (66.0) | 18.0 (64.4) | 16.4 (61.5) | 14.3 (57.7) | 12.0 (53.6) | 16.5 (61.7) |
| Mean daily minimum °C (°F) | 3.3 (37.9) | 4.2 (39.6) | 6.3 (43.3) | 9.0 (48.2) | 11.6 (52.9) | 13.1 (55.6) | 12.7 (54.9) | 12.5 (54.5) | 11.8 (53.2) | 9.2 (48.6) | 6.0 (42.8) | 4.2 (39.6) | 8.7 (47.7) |
| Record low °C (°F) | −9.5 (14.9) | −8.3 (17.1) | −6.5 (20.3) | −4.5 (23.9) | 2.3 (36.1) | 2.0 (35.6) | 7.0 (44.6) | 2.5 (36.5) | 1.5 (34.7) | −2.3 (27.9) | −5.0 (23.0) | −14.4 (6.1) | −14.4 (6.1) |
| Average precipitation mm (inches) | 14.1 (0.56) | 24.3 (0.96) | 5.5 (0.22) | 4.9 (0.19) | 15.7 (0.62) | 73.6 (2.90) | 117.5 (4.63) | 122.6 (4.83) | 100.9 (3.97) | 43.7 (1.72) | 14.6 (0.57) | 15.0 (0.59) | 552.4 (21.75) |
| Average precipitation days (≥ 0.1 mm) | 2.6 | 2.4 | 1.3 | 1.5 | 4.0 | 10.5 | 15.5 | 16.0 | 12.5 | 6.3 | 2.3 | 3.0 | 77.9 |
| Average relative humidity (%) | 51 | 47 | 41 | 39 | 43 | 57 | 66 | 67 | 68 | 61 | 54 | 55 | 54 |
| Mean monthly sunshine hours | 237 | 233 | 273 | 280 | 299 | 262 | 232 | 237 | 209 | 242 | 250 | 250 | 3,004 |
Source 1: National Meteorological Service (humidity 1981–2000)
Source 2: Deutscher Wetterdienst (sun, 1961–1990) (Note: Station ID for Sombrerete, Zac is 76471 Use this station ID to locate the sunshine duration)

Spring temperatures range between 15 °C (min) and 26 (max) and 7 and 10 Cº (min) between March and April. The first months of summer reaches up to 35 Cº. While, in July and August, when the rains increase (750 mm approx.) The temperature ranges between 13 °C (min) and 28 °C. 5th (max). In autumn, temperatures range between 8 and 11 °C (min) and 18 and 20 °C (max). In winter, temperatures range between 0 (in 2006 -6 °C) and 18 °C (max.). Conditions become more benevolent until the end of February. The cold climate is due to the elevation of the municipality (2300 mSNM), although in the highest parts of Cerro El Papantón they are constant in the months of December and January and temperatures of up to −10 °C. The hottest month is May with more than 24 °C, and the coldest month is January, with 12 °C. The average rainfall is 608 mm per year. The rainiest month is September with 150 mm of rain, and the driest month is March, with 1 mm of rain.

=== Hydrography ===
The main water currents of the Town are Arroyo Grande and it has other smaller ones that are Las Cañadas and Arroyo Barbecho.

== Flora and fauna ==
Villa Insurgentes, because it is located in the area corresponding to Sierra Madre Occidental, represents a refuge for some animal species of which several are endemic to the area. The fauna is characteristic of the coniferous forests in its high-altitude parts, of grasslands, and of scrub dry weather plants. The Sierra de Órganos National Park is 27.59 km from Villa Insurgentes.

The coniferous species found in Villa Insurgentes are diverse, some of which are: pine pine, oak. Other species of trees and plants found in the area are: palm, huizache, maguey, nopal duraznillo, nopal cap, brush, oregano, manzanita, gatuño, jarilla, sotol, biznaga, guayabillo, capulín, tepozán and chives.

Some species of animals are typical of the fauna that makes up the region, although there are endemic species. Common species that can be found at the site are: dura scorpion, field mouse, rattlesnake, alicante, bats, hare, paloma huilota, scaled quail, white-winged pigeon, calandria, raccoon, wild boar, gray fox, rabbit, coyote, tlacuache, badger, wildcat, skunk, spotted owl, lizards, spiders. dragonflies, damselflies, grasshopper, crickets, butterflies, flies, mosquitos, mantis, ladybugs. bees, wasps, ants, moisture mealybugs, and centipede.

=== Domestic fauna ===
Domestic fauna, or domesticated fauna, is constituted by the domestic species themselves, that is, those species subject to the domination of man, who are habituated to live under this domain without being locked or subject and in this state they reproduce indefinitely, with this domain as an objective the exploitation of the ability of various animals to produce work, meat, eggs, and other products and services (horse, bulls, cow, Sheep, Goat, cat, dog, Hen, pig, donkey.).

== Composition of Ejido Villa Insurgente ==
It is made up of the towns of Ojo de Agua, Santa Rita, Salas Pérez, San José de las Corrientes, Pompeii, San Francisco de Órganos, Providencia, Agua Zarca, San Francisco de las Flores, the Alamo, San Juan de los Laureles, San José by Felix, Doroteo Arango, Alfredo V. Bonfil. Al Ejido It also belongs Sierra de Órganos National Park

=== Founded communities ===
These communities were founded by people from 'Villa Insurgentes El Calabazal'

- The Jewel, Dgo
- Child Gunner, zac
- Salas Pérez, zac
- Saint Joseph of the currents, Dgo
- Santa Rita, zac
- Eye of water, zac

=== Economic activities ===
Its activities are:

- Farming
- Livestock
- Commerce

On January 13, 2018, the traditional tianguis began in the center of Villa insurgentes, which has had good acceptance by people from both the community and the arelañas communities. There is the sale of fruits and vegetables, clothing, Mexican snacks, sweets, music records, etc. at a cheap price which helps the economy of the community.

=== Education ===
In Villa Insurgentes there are 70 illiterates whose ages range from 15 years and over; 16 inhabitants between 6 and 14 do not attend school. Of the population from 15 years old, 72 have no schooling, 706 have an incomplete schooling. 165 have a basic education and 134 have a post-basic education.

A total of 71 inhabitants, young people between 15 and 24 years old, have attended school; The average schooling of the population is 6 years. Since 1980, it has the kindergarten Gabino Barreda, a rural primary school with the name of La Corregidora, Technical Secondary School No. 30 Moisés Sanz and the High school / Baccalaureate distance from the State of Zacatecas, which is affiliated with the baccalaureate system of the National Autonomous University of Mexico within its distance modality.

=== Health ===
'Villa Insurgentes Health Center' is a Rdar clinic that has a female doctor and a nurse and offers services from Monday to Friday of 8 a. m. to 2 p. m. and has a pharmacy.

=== Population ===
In the town there are 629 men and 726 women. The female / male ratio is 2,209, and the fertility rate is 3.19 children per woman. Of the total population, 26.35% comes from outside the State of Zacatecas. 3.54% of the inhabitants are illiterate (3.82% of the men, and 3.31% of the women). The level of schooling is 6.46 (6.71 in men and 6.24 in women).

0.00% of the population is indigenous. 0.01% of the population speaks an indigenous language and does not speak Spanish.

26.94% of the inhabitants (more than 12 years) are economically active (48.01% of the men, and 8.68% of the women).

=== violence in the community ===
Hallan a 8 jóvenes torturados y ejecutados en VILLA INSURGENTES 8 Marzo 2011 The bodies of 8 youths, between 14 and 18 years old, were discovered with signs of torture –including two bodies having been decapitated– in Villa Insurgentes, municipio de Sombrerete, Zacatecas, en los límites con Durango, en el mismo sitio donde el lunes dos menores fueron ultimados. El procurador de Justicia del estado, Arturo Nahle García, dijo que, al igual que en el caso de los asesinados hace cuatro días, es muy probable que los muchachos recién hallados sean originarios del municipio duranguense de Poanas. Agregó que los jóvenes, atados de pies y manos, y amordazados, habrían sido levantados y asesinados en Durango, y posteriormente sus cuerpos abandonados en suelo zacatecano. El vocero del gobierno de Zacatecas, Mario Caballero, dijo que cerca de los ocho cuerpos había una bolsa con un kilogramo de semilla de mariguana.

Deja tres muertos enfrentamiento en Villa Insurgentes 17 Mayo 2011 La Procuraduría General de Justicia del Estado de Zacatecas informó que elementos de la Décima Zona Militar, son sede en Durango, perseguía a una célula del crimen organizado desde el Vicente Guerrero, Durango, y que al llegar a Zacatecas se enfrascaron en un tiroteo que duró casi una hora. Después de la refriega tres hombres no identificados perdieron la vida, y el resto de los supuestos delincuentes logró huir. Las fuerzas castrenses decomisaron en la zona una camioneta pick up marca Toyota, así como un rifle de asalto y dos pistolas. Los cuerpos de los fallecidos fueron recogidos por elementos periciales y el agente del Ministerio Público del fuero común, que llegó al lugar dos horas y media después de enfrentamiento, y fueron trasladados a la ciudad de Zacatecas, donde se espera sean identificados. En la zona se recogieron decenas de casquillos percutidos de grueso calibre. En unas horas más el gobierno del estado de Zacatecas emitirá más información. Otra versión Esta mañana la primera versión que corrió es que tres personas decapitadas fueron encontradas por elementos de seguridad en la comunidad Villa Insurgentes de Sombrerete, hecho que ocasionó que un célula del crimen organizado se topara con elementos del Ejército Mexicano comisionados en Durango y se desatara una cruenta balacera. Los hechos ocurrieron a las 9 de la mañana en los límites entre Durango y Zacatecas, según información proporcionada por la Décima Zona Militar con sede en la capital del vecino estado. Se informó que tres hombres de entre 30 y 35 años de edad fueron prácticamente tirados en las inmediaciones de la citada localidad, y una hora y media después llegaron los efectivos militares para resguardar la zona. Al salir de la comunidad se toparon con integrantes del crimen organizado, desatándose una balacera que se prolongó varios minutos. Esta versión fue negada por las autoridades de Zacatecas.

Niño mata a su amigo ‘jugando’ a las pistolas 8 Agosto 2013 Un menor de edad de 11 años asesinó accidentalmente a su amigo Julián Javier Serrano de 12 años de edad en la comunidad de Villa Insurgentes, en el municipio de Sombrerete, Zacatecas, mientras jugaba con una pistola que disparó. De acuerdo a los primeros reportes los niños jugaban a “las pistolitas”, pero uno de ellos traía el arma que estaba en la casa cargada y al apuntarle a la cabeza a su compañero apretó el gatillo, la bala fue a dar a la cabeza del otro menor, quien murió inmediatamente. El niño más chico aparentemente no sabía que estaba cargada la pistola, mientras que el mayor advirtió el riesgo cuando le apuntó a su cabeza, sin embargo, no pudo evitar que le disparara. La pistola se hallaba en el domicilio y a la vista del pequeño, quien inocentemente la tomó para jugar sin pensar en las fatales consecuencias; el accidente ocurrió alrededor de las 4 de la tarde.

Hallan fosa en el patio de una casa 21 Junio 2019 Luego de varias horas de búsqueda, autoridades de seguridad, así como elementos periciales, lograron dar con una fosa clandestina, pero de una manera singular, pues estaba en el patio de una vivienda, y en ella había un hombre sin vida. El hallazgo ocurrió la madrugada de este viernes en el Barrio Laguna de la comunidad Villa Insurgentes del municipio de Sombrerete. A través de investigaciones, las autoridades terminaron dando con el lugar, donde había múltiples latas de cerveza vacías, daños en una puerta y parte de un muro. Al ingresar hasta el patio, la escena se tornó más sospechosa, pues encontraron una sábana color blanco con manchas de sangre, y junto a ella, semi enterrado en una fosa clandestina, y en avanzado estado de descomposición, estaba el cuerpo de un hombre. El lugar fue asegurado, y la situación quedó a cargo de las instancias ministeriales; hasta el momento, el fallecido se encuentra como no identificado.

== Municipal delegates ==
| Nombre | Cargo | Fecha | Color |
|---|---|---|---|
| Leonardo Salas Serrano | Delegado | 2010–2013 | ◼️ |
| Ángel Pérez Ortega | Delegado | 2013–2016 | ♦️ |
| Javier Alvarado Hernandez | Delegado | 2016–2018 | 🔷 |
| Simon Canales Ortiz | Delegado | 2018–2020 | 🔶 |
| Jorge castañera | Delegado | 2020–4024 | 🟪 |
| Beatriz Guerrero | Delegado | 2024–2024 | |
| Yolanda Serrano | Delegado | 2024–present | |

== Tourist attractions ==
- San José del Calabazal Parish
- Employer Fair (FPVI)
- Holy Week
- Missionary's Holy Cross
- Christ the King
- Santa Cruz Masons
- plaza El Salvador
- Humberto serrano Ibarra Public Library
- Pantheon (Old)

== Reynas of the Villa Insurgentes Fair (FPVI) ==
| Nombre | Fecha de Coronación | Originaria | Foto |
|---|---|---|---|
| Concepcion Salas | 18 de marzo de 1970 | Barrio Laguna | |
| Martha Meza | 18 de marzo de 1972 | Barrio La Zorrita | |
| Monica Meza | 18 de marzo de 1979 | Barrio Buenavista | |
| Aracely Hernández | 18 de marzo de 2009 | Barrio Los Intumidos | |
| Wendy Ortega | 18 de marzo de 2011 | Barrio Laguna | |
| Dalia Barrientos | 18 de marzo de 2013 | Ojo De Agua Del Calabazal | |
| Adriana Castillo | 18 de marzo de 2014 | Barrio La Tarjea | |
| Angélica Salas | 18 de marzo de 2015 | Santa Rita Del Calabazal | |
| ZuZy Hernández | 18 de marzo de 2016 | Salas Pérez (El Ranchito) | |
| karina Ceseñas | 18 de marzo de 2017 | Barrio Laguna | |
| Julisa Ortega | 18 de marzo de 2018 | Barrio Barbecho | |
| Karla Gómez | 18 de marzo de 2019 | Barrio Jalisco | |
| Evelin Pérez | 18 de marzo de 2020 a 2023 | Barrio laguna | |
| Adriana Salas Meza | 18 de marzo de 2024 | Comunidad Santa Rita Del Calabazal | |

== Distinguished characters ==
- Juan De Salas. Founder of Villa Insurgentes (the pumpkin) 1555 – 1595
- Bernandino De Salas Founder of Villa Insurgentes (the gourd) 1555 – 1595

Catholics

- Antonio López Aviña Reconstruction of the San José del Calabazal Parish December 21, 1975

== Villa Insurgentes Media ==
=== TV ===
| Canal Virtual TDT | Siglas | Afiliación | Resolución y Aspecto | ERP | Empresa | Ciudad de origen | Sitio Web |
|---|---|---|---|---|---|---|---|
| 1.1 | XHCPZ-TDT | Azteca Uno | 1080i – 16:9 | 9.13 kW | Grupo Salinas | Sombrerete | |
| 7.1 | XHCPZ-TDT | Azteca 7 | 480i – 16:9 | 9.13 kW | Grupo Salinas | Sombrerete | |
| 2.1 | XHSOZ-TDT | Las Estrellas | 1080i – 16:9 | 32 kW | Grupo Televisa | Sombrerete | |
| 5.1 | XHSMZ-TDT | Canal 5* | 1080i – 16:9 | 32 kW | Grupo Televisa | Sombrerete | |
| 3.1 | (En etapa de instalación o pruebas) | Imagen Televisión | 1080i – 16:9 | | Grupo Imagen | Sombrerete | |
| 3.4 | (En etapa de instalación o pruebas) | Excélsior | 480i – 16:9 | | Grupo Imagen | Sombrerete | |

=== Radio ===
Amplitud Modulada

| Frecuencia kHz | Estación | Nombre | Ubicación del transmisor | Potencia kW | Operador | sitio web |
|---|---|---|---|---|---|---|
| 690 | XEMA-AM | La Mejor FM + 107.9 FM | Fresnillo de González Echeverría, Zac | 50.0d / 2.0n | MVS Radio | Grupo B-15 |
| 930 | XEQS-AM | Romántica + 90.3FM | Fresnillo de González Echeverría, Zac | 25.0 | Grupo B15 | Grupo B-15 |
| 770 | XHIH-AM | La Única + 103.3 FM | Fresnillo de González Echeverría, Zac | 32.2 | OIR Radiodifusión Nacional | |
| 610 | XHEL-AM | El Super Canal + 95.1 FM | Fresnillo de González Echeverría, Zac | 33.22 | OIR Radiodifusión Nacional | |
| 1370 | XHRPU-AM | La Lupe | Victoria de Durango, Dgo. | 3.0 | Multimedios Radio | |
| 590 | XEE-AM | Radio Fórmula | Victoria de Durango, Dgo | 10 | Radio Fórmula | |
| 660 AM | XHWX-AM | La Poderosa + 98.1 FM | Victoria de Durango, Dgo | 25.0 | Grupo Radiorama | |

Frecuencia Modulada

| Frecuencia MHz | Estación | Nombre | Ubicación del transmisor | Potencia kW | Operador | sitio web |
|---|---|---|---|---|---|---|
| 90.3 | XEQS-FM | Romántica + 930 AM | Fresnillo de González Echeverría, Zac | 25.0 | Grupo B15 | Grupo B-15 |
| 95.1 | XHEL-FM | El Super Canal + 610 AM | Fresnillo de González Echeverría, Zac | 3.0 | OIR Radiodifusión Nacional | |
| 100.5 | XHFRE-FM | Exa Fm | Fresnillo de González Echeverría, Zac | 100.0 | MVS Radio | Grupo B-15 |
| 103.3 | XHIH-FM | La Única + 770 AM | Fresnillo de González Echeverría, Zac | 32.2 | OIR Radiodifusión Nacional | |
| 106.1 | XHRRA-FM | Stereo Fresnillo | Fresnillo de González Echeverría, Zac | 3.0 | Grupo Radiofónico Zer | |
| 107.9 | XHEMA-FM | La Mejor FM + 690 AM | Fresnillo de González Echeverría, Zac | 25.0 | MVS Radio | Grupo B-15 |
| 105.3 | XHE-FM | Fiesta Mexicana | Victoria de Durango, Dgo | 590 kHz | Radio Fórmula | |
| 96.5 | XHDNG-FM | La Tremenda | Victoria de Durango, Dgo | 25.0 | Grupo Garza Limón | |
| 102.9 | XHRPU-FM | La Lupe + 1370 AM | Victoria de Durango, Dgo. | 3.0 | Multimedios Radio | |
| 92.1 | XHITD-FM | Estéreo Tecnológico | Victoria de Durango, Dgo | 3.0 | Instituto Tecnología de Durango | |
| 92.3 | XHPSBZ-FM | La Que Buena | Sombrerete, Zac | 103 | Radio Cañón | |
| 107.7 | XHOH-FM | @FM | Victoria de Durango, Dgo | 25.0 | Grupo Radiorama | |
| 94.1 | XHUAD-FM | Estéreo Lobo | Victoria de Durango, Dgo | 3.0 | Universidad autónoma de Durango | |
| 98.1 | XHWX-FM | La Poderosa + 660 AM | Victoria de Durango, Dgo | 25.0 | Grupo Radiorama | |
| 98.9 | XHDU-FM | La Ley | Victoria de Durango, Dgo | 25.0 | Grupo Radio Carlos C. Armas Vega | |
| 90.7 | XHPSTZ-FM | La Bonita Del Norte | Sombrerete, zac | 6.0 | Jorge Armando García Calderón | |

=== Road ===
- Federal Highway 45
- López Mateos
- Constitution
- Corrector
- Cesar Lopez de Lara Boulevard
- Moleros
- Zarco
- Principal

== Public services ==
| Type of Service | Compañía | Location | Service Quality | Descripción |
|---|---|---|---|---|
| Agua potable | Comité | Villa Insurgentes (el calabazal) | 75% | |
| Drenaje | Comité | Villa Insurgentes (el calabazal) | 100% | |
| Recolección De Basura | Comité | Villa Insurgentes (el calabazal) | 99% | |
| Alumbrado público | Ayuntamiento Sombrerete | Villa Insurgentes (el calabazal) | 50% | |
| pavimentación | Ayuntamiento Sombrerete | Villa Insurgentes (el calabazal) | 30% | |
| Electricity | CFE | Sombrerete | 65% | |
| Emergencies | Ayuntamiento Sombrerete | Sombrerete | 0% | No Cuenta con este servicio |
| Natural Gas | Gas Natural Fenosa | Villa Insurgentes (el calabazal) | 0% | No cuenta con este servicio |
| Public Security | Ayuntamiento Sombrerete | Villa Insurgentes (el calabazal) | 0% | No cuenta con este servicio |
| Limpieza Pública | Ayuntamiento Sombrerete | Villa Insurgentes (el calabazal) | 0% | No cuenta con este servicio |
| Centro de salud | Servicio de salud de Zacatecas | Villa Insurgentes (el Calabazal) | 50% | Casi nunca tiene medicamentos |

=== Means of transport ===
Villa Insurgentes has two urban buses that pass through its main streets and the communities of the Ojo de Agua metropolitan area, Santa Rita, Salas Pérez.

Route 1, from 7:00 to 8:30 in the morning and from 1:30 to 4:30 in the afternoon, from Monday to Friday and on Saturdays and Sundays from 8:30 to 9:30 in the morning and 1:30 to 2:30 in the afternoon. This city bus serves people shopping in the neighboring municipality of Vicente Guerrero and also the students of High School Cobaed and Cebetis.

Route 2, This bus leaves at around 6:30–7:00 in the morning and returns at 3:30 pm Monday through Friday goes to the neighboring municipality of Sombrerete. The route serves students at High School Cobaso and shoppers.

Taxis are available sometimes, check the local schedule for current times.
