= 720 AM =

AM radio frequency

The following radio stations broadcast on AM frequency 720 kHz: 720 AM is a United States clear-channel frequency. WGN Chicago and KOTZ Kotzebue, Alaska, share Class A status of 720 kHz.

Because 720 kHz is a multiple of both 9 and 10, the frequency is available for use by broadcast stations in all three ITU regions.

== Argentina ==
- LV10 in Mendoza
- LRA 59 in Gobernador Gregores, Santa Cruz

== Brazil ==
- ZYH 281 in Itacoatiara, Amazonas
- ZYI 390 in Dourados, Mato Grosso do Sul
- ZYI 390 in Recife, Pernambuco
- ZYK 276 in Porto Alegre, Rio Grande do Sul
- ZYK 575 in Casa Branca, São Paulo
- ZYK 722 in Olímpia, São Paulo
- ZYK 718 in Cruzeiro, São Paulo

== Bolivia ==
- CP148 in Chulumani
- CP27 in La Paz

== China ==
- CNR Business Radio in Dalian
- CNR China Rural Radio in Huabei region

== Cyprus ==
- ZJM-2 in Zakaki

== Denmark ==
=== Greenland ===
- OXF in Simiutaq

== Ethiopia ==
- ETEBS in Legedadi

== Germany ==
- Langenberg transmission tower in Langenberg, Velbert, shut down on 6 July 2015

== India ==
- VUM in Chennai (formerly Madras)

== Indonesia ==
- 8FV200 in Ambon
- PM2B... in Jakarta
- PM4... in Majenang
- PM8DCV in Pinrang
- PM4... in Semarang
- PM3B... in Serang
- PM8CAN in Talangpadang
- PM3E... in Waingapu
- PM7CLV in Wonosobo

== Jamaica ==
- 6YR in Naggo Head

== Japan ==
- JOAR in Kumano, Mie
- JOZF in Takayama, Gifu
- JOZF in Kamioka, Gifu
- JOIL in Kitakyushu, Fukuoka

== Mexico ==
- XEDE-AM in Arteaga, Coahuila
- XEJCC-AM in Cd. Juarez, Chihuahua
- XEJAGC-AM in Juan Aldama, Zacatecas
- XEKN-AM in Huetamo, Michoacán
- XEQZ-AM in San Juan de los Lagos, Jalisco

== New Zealand ==
- ZL4YZ in Dacre

== North Korea ==
- Korean Central Broadcasting Station in Kanggye

== Peru ==
- OAX2J in Trujillo

== Philippines ==
- DZSO in San Fernando, La Union
- DYOK in Iloilo City

== Portugal ==
- CSA4 in Azurara
- CSA302 in Castelo Branco
- CSA212 in Elvas
- CSA303 in Faro
- CSA204 in Guarda
- CSA235 in Mirandela

== Russia ==
- RW677 in Yuzhno-Sakhalinsk

== Spain ==
=== Canary Islands ===
- EFJ57 in Santa Cruz de Tenerife

== Suriname ==
- PZX26 in Uitkijk

== Sweden ==
- SCL in Kiruna

== Thailand ==
- HSND-AM in Sattahip

== United States ==
Stations in bold are clear-channel stations.

Call sign	City of license	Facility ID	Class	Daytime power (kW)	Nighttime power (kW)	Critical hours power (kW)	Unlimited power (kW)	Transmitter coordinates
KFIR	Sweet Home, Oregon	23024	D	10	0.146			44.595278°N 123.126111°W
**KOTZ**	Kotzebue, Alaska	35440	A				10	66.839444°N 162.568056°W
KSAH	Universal City, Texas	23072	B	10	0.89			29.530833°N 98.1775°W
WGCR	Pisgah Forest, North Carolina	2198	D	50		15		35.252778°N 82.674444°W
**WGN**	Chicago, Illinois	72114	A				50	42.011667°N 88.035278°W
WGST	Hogansville, Georgia	39620	D	7.97				33.065°N 84.956389°W
WHYF	Shiremanstown, Pennsylvania	26973	D	2.2				40.191111°N 76.9525°W
WJIB	Cambridge, Massachusetts	6146	B	5	0.189			42.406778°N 71.087000°W (daytime); 42.406889°N 71.086222°W (nighttime)
WRZN	Hernando, Florida	39769	B	10	0.25			28.9225°N 82.3725°W

== Vietnam ==
- 3WT-25 in Hué

== Defunct ==
- BBC Radio 4 in London and Northern Ireland
