= KPCV =

KPCV may refer to:

- KPCV (FM), a radio station (91.7 FM) licensed to Portales, New Mexico, United States
- KVLA-FM, a radio station (90.3 FM) licensed to Coachella, California, United States, which held the call sign KPCV from 2008 to 2011
