= 770 AM =

AM radio frequency

The following radio stations broadcast on AM frequency 770 kHz: 770 AM is a United States clear-channel frequency. WABC New York City and KCHU Valdez, Alaska, share Class A status on 770 kHz.

== In Argentina ==
- Cooperativa in Buenos Aires

== In Canada ==
- CHQR in Calgary, Alberta - 50 kW, transmitter located at 50.8211°N 114.052°W

== In Colombia ==
- HJJX in Bogotá, Distrito Capital

== In El Salvador ==
- YSKL in San Salvador, El Salvador

== In Mexico ==
- XEACH-AM in Guadalupe, Nuevo León
- XEANT-AM in Tancanhuitz de Santos, San Luis Potosí
- XEFRTM-AM in Fresnillo, Zacatecas
- XEML-AM in Apatzingán, Michoacán

== In the United States ==
Stations in bold are clear-channel stations.

Call sign	City of license	Facility ID	Class	Daytime power (kW)	Nighttime power (kW)	Unlimited power (kW)	Transmitter coordinates
KATL	Miles City, Montana	62297	B	10	1		46.396111°N 105.778889°W
KCBC	Manteca, California	34587	B	50	4.1		37.7975°N 120.883611°W
KCBI	Garland, Texas	17303	B	10	1		33.032778°N 96.575278°W
**KCHU**	Valdez, Alaska	65232	A			9.7	61.111111°N 146.260833°W
KKOB	Albuquerque, New Mexico	11251	B	50	50		35.2025°N 106.611389°W
KKOB	Santa Fe, New Mexico	11251	D			0.23	35.682222°N 105.9725°W
KTTH	Seattle, Washington	27023	B	50	5		47.393889°N 122.423611°W
KUOM	Minneapolis, Minnesota	69337	D	5			44.998333°N 93.188333°W
**WABC**	New York, New York	70658	A	50	50		40.880556°N 74.069722°W
WAIS	Buchtel, Ohio	48256	D	1			39.432222°N 82.200556°W
WCGW	Nicholasville, Kentucky	43865	D	1			37.885278°N 84.529444°W
WEW	Saint Louis, Missouri	1088	D	1			38.621667°N 90.076111°W
WKFB	Jeannette, Pennsylvania	10026	D	0.75			40.288889°N 79.701111°W
WLWL	Rockingham, North Carolina	58964	D	5			34.925°N 79.786389°W
WTOR	Youngstown, New York	74121	D	13			43.218056°N 78.948056°W
WVNN	Athens, Alabama	3084	D	7			34.749722°N 86.798611°W
WYRV	Cedar Bluff, Virginia	9709	D	5			37.084722°N 81.768611°W

== In Uruguay ==
- CX 12 Radio Oriental in Montevideo
