= XEJAGC-AM =

Radio station in Juan Aldama, Zacatecas

- Juan Aldama, Zacatecas; Mexico
- Frequency: 720 AM
- Branding: La Bonita del Norte

Programming
- Format: Regional Mexican

Ownership
- Owner: Jorge Armando García Calderón
- Sister stations: XHPRGZ-FM (Río Grande), XHPSTZ-FM (Sombrerete)

History
- First air date: 2018
- Call sign meaning: Jorge Armando García Calderón

Technical information
- Licensing authority: CRT
- Class: B
- Power: 2 kW
- Transmitter coordinates: 24°13′30.4″N 103°22′13.9″W

Links
- Webcast: XEJAGC-AM
- Website: XEJAGC-AM on Facebook

XEJAGC-AM is a radio station on 720 AM in Juan Aldama, Zacatecas. It is owned by Jorge Armando García Calderón and carries a Regional Mexican format known as La Bonita del Norte.

== History ==
XEJAGC was awarded in the IFT-4 radio auction of 2017. The station officially signed on in the summer of 2018.
