= KFFP-LP =

Coordinates: 45°33′34″N 122°39′15″W

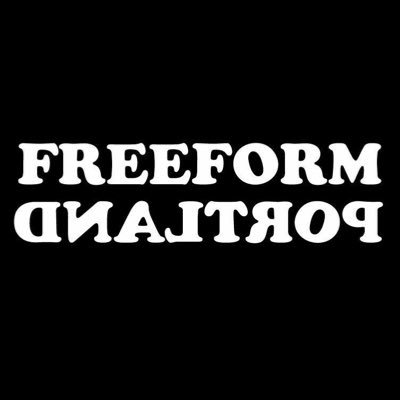
- Portland, Oregon; United States
- Broadcast area: North Portland
- Frequency: 90.3 MHz
- Branding: Freeform Portland

Programming
- Format: Freeform
- Affiliations: National Federation of Community Broadcasters

Ownership
- Owner: Radio 23

History
- First air date: April 15, 2016
- Call sign meaning: FreeForm Portland

Technical information
- Licensing authority: FCC
- Facility ID: 195263
- Class: L1
- ERP: 100 watts
- HAAT: 15.7 meters (52 ft)

Links
- Public license information: LMS
- Webcast: Listen Live
- Website: freeformportland.org

KFFP-LP (90.3 FM, "Freeform Portland") is a low-power listener supported community radio station in Portland, Oregon. It broadcasts live programming at 90.3 FM 24 hours a day, seven days a week. It first began broadcasting live in April 2016.

== Freeform radio ==
Freeform Portland is modeled after WFMU in Jersey City, New Jersey, the longest running freeform radio station in the United States. Freeform radio is a radio station programming format in which the disc jockey is given total control over what music to play, regardless of music genre or commercial interests. Freeform radio stands in contrast to most commercial radio stations, in which DJs have little or no influence over programming structure or playlists.

== History ==
During 2013, Common Frequencies, a nonprofit organization dedicated to community radio, applied for and was granted a low-power FM license from the FCC. In December 2014, Freeform Portland registered with the state as a nonprofit and held their first meeting. There were three volunteers present during the meeting. They discussed the mission of the station, which was to create an outlet for music and art enthusiasts to gain access to the airwaves.

Between January and April 2015, Freeform Portland hosted benefit shows and prepared for the launch of their Indiegogo campaign. Ken Freedman, general manager of WFMU, recorded a video in support of Freeform Portland during the initial fundraising period of the station, stressing the importance of the community building aspect of the genre.

May 2015 saw Freeform Portland kicking off their Indiegogo campaign to purchase station equipment. They had over 20 volunteers and their overall station goal was to raise $7,500 in donations. The fundraiser surpassed its goal and raised $11,500.

Freeform Portland continued to search for a future home during the months of June through October 2015. During that October, Freeform Portland were introduced to Jen and Mark Pendergrass, who run the Baker Building at 5511 N Albina Ave in North Portland. By November, Freeform Portland set up their studios within the historic 1912 landmark.

On April 1, 2016, Freeform Portland had its soft launch via online streaming only and on April 15, 2016, Freeform Portland threw its launch party, during which their radio engineer, Dave Fulton, flipped the transmitter switch.

Freeform Portland is the only freeform radio station in Portland.

The station only has a clear signal in central Portland and the immediate areas. This is due to the station’s low power, alongside co-channel interference from KPOR in Mt Hood, KSLC in McMinnville and KLWO in Longview.
