= XHPRGZ-FM =

Radio station in Río Grande, Zacatecas, Mexico

- Río Grande, Zacatecas; Mexico
- Frequency: 92.7 FM
- Branding: La Bonita del Norte

Programming
- Format: Regional Mexican

Ownership
- Owner: Jorge Armando García Calderón
- Sister stations: XHPSTZ-FM (Sombrerete), XEJAGC-AM (Juan Aldama)

History
- First air date: 2018
- Call sign meaning: Río Grande Zacatecas

Technical information
- Licensing authority: CRT
- Class: AA
- ERP: 3 kW
- HAAT: 26.5 m (87 ft)

Links
- Webcast: Listen live
- Website: comunicacionesjfj.com

XHPRGZ-FM is a radio station on 92.7 FM in Río Grande, Zacatecas. It is owned by Jorge Armando García Calderón and carries a Regional Mexican format known as La Bonita del Norte.

== History ==
XHPRGZ was awarded in the IFT-4 radio auction of 2017. The station officially signed on in the summer of 2018.
