= Nuestra Belleza Zacatecas 2011 =

- Date: June 24, 2011
- Presenters: Laura Castro Gamboa, Gímel Soberanis Cantón
- Venue: Centro Platero, Guadalupe, Zacatecas
- Broadcaster: Televisa
- Entrants: 8
- Placements: 3

Nuestra Belleza Zacatecas 2011, was held in the Centro Platero of Guadalupe, Zacatecas on June 24, 2011. At the conclusion of the final night of competition Stephanie Ávila crowned her successor. Eight contestants competed for the title.

== Results ==
=== Placements ===
Final results	Contestant
Nuestra Belleza Zacatecas 2011	Michelle Román Hurtado
1st Runner-up	Andrea Diaz Ledesma
2nd Runner-up	Zulema Alaniz Hurtado

== Contestants ==
Hometown	Contestant
Calera	Karol Monserrat
Morelos	Karla Edith Moreno
Jerez	Michelle Román
Juan Aldama	Silvia Jazmín González
Juchipila	Cristal Pelayo
Ojocaliente	Jazmín Gámez
Zacatecas	Andrea Díaz
Zacatecas	Zulema Elizabeth
