= KATL =

KATL may refer to:

- KATL (AM), a radio station (770 AM) licensed to Miles City, Montana, United States
- Hartsfield–Jackson Atlanta International Airport (ICAO location indicator: KATL) in Atlanta, Georgia, United States
- Kobra and the Lotus, a Canadian heavy metal band
