= WHCR =

WHCR may refer to:

- WHCR-FM, a radio station (90.3 FM) licensed to New York, New York, United States
- WHCR-LP, a defunct low-power radio station (105.3 FM) licensed to Hobgood, North Carolina, United States
