= Ojitos de Santa Lucía =

Town in the Mexican state of Zacatecas

Ojitos de Santa Lucía, Zacatecas
- Town
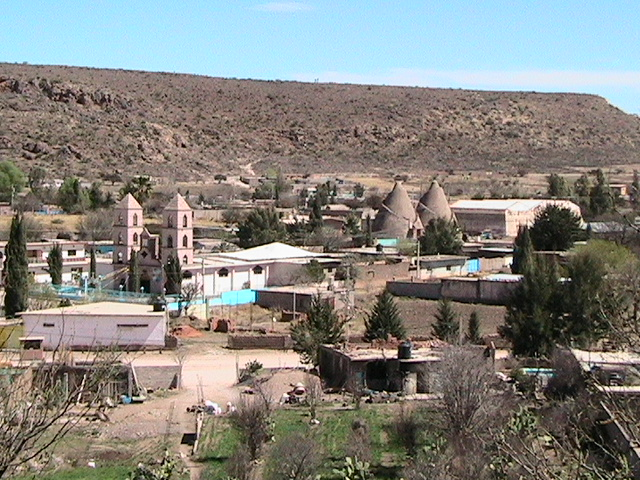
- Ojitos de Santa Lucía

- Location within Zacatecas Location within Mexico
- Coordinates: 24°18′32.4″N 103°20′44.16″W
- Country: Mexico
- State: Zacatecas
- Municipality: Juan Aldama
- Elevation: 2,023 m (6,637 ft)

Population (2005)
  - Total: 1,800
- Time zone: UTC-6 (CST)
- Website: Ojitos de Santa Lucía

Ojitos de Santa Lucía is a town located in the northwestern region of the Mexican state of Zacatecas. According to the 2000 census it had a population of 1,800 inhabitants.

== Name ==
"Ojitos de Santa Lucía" literally translates from Spanish to "Eyes of Saint Lucy", but the word "Ojitos" can also mean little eyes or beautiful eyes. Although today it is believed that the name came from the patron of the town, Santa Lucía, the town was originally named after two central lakes located in downtown Ojitos. Later the natural springs stopped refilling with fresh water and are no longer in the town. The word comes from the use of "Ojo de Agua", meaning lake or body of water. The predominant Catholics renamed the town and added the "de Santa Lucía" at the end to honor their patron.

== History ==
Ojitos de Santa Lucía was built by the indigenous Zacatecs of the area to keep the town of Juan Aldama, founded mostly by Tlaxcalan people who migrated from the south, from expanding furthermore into their territory.

== Geography ==
The town is located in the Municipality of Juan Aldama in the state of Zacatecas. It is the biggest town in this municipality after Juan Aldama. It is bordered by the towns of Jalpa, Juan Aldama, and Las Norias in the state of Zacatecas and by Reyes in the state of Durango. The town itself is surrounded by three hills: El Cerro Caido, El Cerro Gordo, and El Cerro de la Peña. Its altitude above sea water is 1,990 meters while its longitude is 103.343333 and the latitude is 24.306389.

== Economy ==
The preponderant activity is the agriculture and livestock industry, followed by commerce.
