= XHPSTZ-FM =

Radio station in Sombrerete, Zacatecas

- Sombrerete, Zacatecas; Mexico
- Frequency: 90.7 FM
- Branding: La Bonita del Norte

Programming
- Format: Regional Mexican

Ownership
- Owner: Jorge Armando García Calderón
- Sister stations: XHPRGZ-FM (Río Grande), XEJAGC-AM (Juan Aldama)

History
- First air date: 2018
- Call sign meaning: SombrereTe Zacatecas

Technical information
- Licensing authority: CRT
- Class: AA
- ERP: 6 kW
- HAAT: 174.3 m (572 ft)
- Transmitter coordinates: 23°38′59″N 103°36′29.5″W

Links
- Webcast: XHPSTZ-FM
- Website: XHPSTZ-FM on Facebook

XHPSTZ-FM is a radio station on 90.7 FM in Sombrerete, Zacatecas. It is owned by Jorge Armando García Calderón and carries a Regional Mexican format known as La Bonita del Norte.

== History ==
XHPSTZ was awarded in the IFT-4 radio auction of 2017. The station officially signed on in the summer of 2018.
