= XHERZ-FM =

Radio station in León, Guanajuato, Mexico

- León, Guanajuato; Mexico
- Frequency: 93.1 MHz (HD Radio)
- Branding: Los 40

Programming
- Format: Spanish & English Top 40 (CHR)
- Affiliations: Radiópolis

Ownership
- Owner: Grupo Audiorama Comunicaciones; (Radio XHRZ León, S.A. de C.V.)
- Sister stations: XHVLO-FM, XHML-FM

History
- First air date: April 11, 1941 (concession)
- Former call signs: XERZ-AM
- Former frequencies: 1240 kHz (1941–1997); 1000 kHz (1997–2015)

Technical information
- Class: B1
- ERP: 3 kW
- HAAT: 176.55 meters (579.2 ft)
- Transmitter coordinates: 21°09′37″N 101°42′55″W

Links
- Webcast: Listen live
- Website: los40leon.com

XHERZ-FM is a radio station on 93.1 FM in León, Guanajuato, Mexico. It is owned by Grupo Audiorama Comunicaciones and carries the Los 40 pop format from Radiópolis.

== History ==
Logo used from 2015 to 2016 rebrand of Los 40

XERZ-AM received its concession on April 11, 1941, becoming the first radio station in León. It broadcast on 1240 kHz and was owned by Rafael Cutberto Navarro, part of his Radio Cadena Nacional operation. In 1948, Cutberto Navarro sold to Carlos Obregón Padilla, who in turn sold to Radio Televisora del Bajío in 1953. In 1980 the station became a part of Grupo ACIR with a contemporary music in Spanish and English as Radio Amistad, which in 1987 it flipped the Radio Festival with a grupera format. In the early 1990s, the station became Heavy Radio with a rock format until a format change to Bonita ranchera music in 1995. In 1997, XERZ changed frequencies and moved to 1000 kHz. In 2009, ACIR sold to Radiorama and became a franchise of W Radio news/talk format.

In 2011, XERZ was approved to migrate to FM. On June 5, 2015, the station became a @FM (Arroba FM) pop format and on August 31, the same year it swapped formats with XHSD-FM and XHERZ became Los 40 franchise format. Radiorama pulled a number of its stations from Televisa Radio formats in the summer of 2017; the station during its time away from Los 40 was known as "Playlist 93.1". The station rejoined Los 40 on May 28, 2018, having become part of Grupo Audiorama Comunicaciones.
