= WSIA =

Radio station at the College of Staten Island

- Staten Island, New York; United States
- Frequency: 88.9 MHz

Programming
- Language: English
- Format: Modern active rock

Ownership
- Owner: College of Staten Island
- Sister stations: WHCR-FM, WKRB

History
- First air date: August 31, 1981
- Call sign meaning: "Staten Island's Answer"

Technical information
- Licensing authority: FCC
- Facility ID: 65557
- Class: D
- ERP: 11 watts
- HAAT: 192 meters (630 ft)
- Transmitter coordinates: 40.598°N 74.114°W

Links
- Public license information: Public file; LMS
- Website: www.wsia.fm

WSIA (88.9 FM) is a college radio station licensed to the College of Staten Island. WSIA broadcasts an alternative rock format and also carries additional music genres as well as talk radio.

== History ==
In the mid 1970s, a group of students interested in radio gathered in a room used by the college amateur radio station, WB2BAZ, in the C Building of The College of Staten Island's Sunnyside campus. They ran some wire to the cafeteria and started spinning records. These students worked with the college and applied for an FM license. They were granted a construction permit.

In the late 1970s, a new group of students applied to the Student Government and Association for money to commence construction. In 1980 a general manager, Greg Adamo, was hired to handle the daily tasks of the station and coordinate the construction of the station. In early 1981, an agreement was reached to acquire an antenna site on Todt Hill which is noted as the tallest point on the East Coast. Phone lines were eventually installed for the transmitter. The remaining construction of the studio was expedited in the basement of the E Building on the Sunnyside campus. On August 31, 1981, WSIA commenced regularly scheduled programming. It was the culmination of a tremendous amount of hard work by members of the college and students.

For the next 12 years, WSIA languished somewhat invisibly in the E Building basement below the cafeteria at the Sunnyside campus. Few people at the college even knew the E Building had a basement or that The College of Staten Island had a radio station. However, many people from outside the immediate college community had come to realize just what WSIA was doing. With the format in place, WSIA began gaining a reputation for playing music that nobody else on the overcrowded New York radio dial was.

The founding members of WSIA include Ronald Resnick, Greg Cully, Joe Mininni, Karen Cino, and Diane T (Champagne) among others.

A number of changes have happened since 1981. The station's offices and studios have been enlarged and improved. In 1985, the college showed its commitment by picking up the salary of the general manager. Previously, this had been paid out of student fees. The programming has also undergone a number of changes. Yet, students have always been committed to two things. One, to be new and innovative. The other, to serve the Staten Island community. Although WSIA was on the cutting edge in playing news music, the station was not highly promoted by the college. Most of the station's support was a direct result of its listeners as the station grew in recognition. In 1985 and 1986 WSIA was host to two regional conferences of the Intercollegiate Broadcasting Convention Intercollegiate Broadcasting System.

In 1993, the College of Staten Island moved its entire campus to a larger location. This enabled an opportunity for WSIA to obtain a state-of-the-art facility. The facility now houses a 64 track recording studio, multiple broadcast booths/rooms and full office space for its staff. The recording studio also houses musical instruments such as guitars, pianos, turntables, and much more.

== WSIA Today ==
WSIA serves as an outlet for breaking emerging artists to the mass public. The station and its studio is a learning ground for students and aspiring broadcast enthusiasts alike. The station is operated by an all-student board of directors.

Membership at WSIA is open to any student of the College of Staten Island.

== Current Programming ==
Since the early days, programming has undergone a number of changes. Despite the growth of the station, the students remain committed to using the facilities in new and innovate ways. The station remains a beneficial and influential outlet to its listeners and sponsors.

WSIA's current programming includes music, news, public affairs discussion, promotions, sports talk, and more. The music department broadcasts live programs catering to various genres of music. The stations music department is noted to have hosted many established recording artist's in-studio commentary and interviews. The sports department broadcasts many live events such as baseball, college basketball, football, and more. Local bands have been featured on the WSIA airwaves,
