= WLWL =

- Rockingham, North Carolina; United States
- Frequency: 770 kHz C-QUAM AM Stereo
- Branding: 770 The Big Wave

Programming
- Format: Urban oldies

Ownership
- Owner: Beach Music Broadcasting, Inc.

History
- First air date: 1970

Technical information
- Licensing authority: FCC
- Facility ID: 58964
- Class: D
- Power: 5,000 watts day
- Transmitter coordinates: 34°55′30″N 79°47′11″W

Links
- Public license information: Public file; LMS
- Webcast: Listen Live
- Website: www.77wlwl.com

WLWL (770 AM) is a radio station broadcasting an urban oldies music format with an emphasis on beach music that is licensed to Rockingham, North Carolina, United States. While its effective coverage range is the Sandhills area of Central North and South Carolina, its signal reaches as far as Charlotte, 75 miles to the west. The station is currently owned by Beach Music Broadcasting, Inc.

The station was first licensed March 6, 1970. WLWL uses airchecks from WABC in New York City that feature the words "seventy-seven" in jingle form to promote its frequency of 770 kHz.

WLWL broadcasts only during daylight hours, to avoid interference with WABC, which has a Class A clear-channel license for the same frequency.
