= KFIR =

- Sweet Home, Oregon; United States
- Broadcast area: Willamette Valley
- Frequency: 720 kHz
- Branding: KFIR 720

Programming
- Format: Talk radio
- Affiliations: Townhall News

Ownership
- Owner: Radio Fiesta Network

History
- First air date: August 7, 1968
- Former frequencies: 1370 kHz (1968–2007)

Technical information
- Licensing authority: FCC
- Facility ID: 23024
- Class: D
- Power: 10,000 watts (day); 184 watts (night)
- Transmitter coordinates: 44°24′51″N 122°44′18″W

Links
- Public license information: Public file; LMS
- Webcast: Listen Live
- Website: kfir720am.com

KFIR (720 AM) is a commercial radio station licensed to Sweet Home, Oregon, United States, serving the Willamette Valley. It airs a talk format and is owned by Radio Fiesta Network, LLC.

By day, KFIR is powered at 10,000 watts using a non-directional antenna. It covers the cities of Albany, Corvallis, Lebanon and Salem during the day. But 720 AM is a clear-channel frequency on which WGN in Chicago is the dominant Class A station. To protect WGN from interference, at night KFIR greatly reduces power to 146 watts.

== History ==
KFIR signed on the air on August 7, 1968. It originally broadcast at 1370 kHz and was a daytimer station. It was powered at 1,000 watts but was required to go off the air at night. It played middle of the road (MOR) and country music. World and national news was supplied by the ABC Entertainment Network.

In 2007, it got permission from the Federal Communications Commission (FCC) to move its frequency. It relocated to 720 AM and boosted its power to 10,000 watts. That gave it a better signal, since stations lower on the AM dial can be heard over a wider area in the daytime. And it was allowed to stay on the air at night, although with reduced power.
