= XHBP-FM =

Radio station in Gómez Palacio, Durango, Mexico

Gómez Palacio, Durango; Mexico
- Broadcast area: Torreón, Coahuila
- Frequency: 90.3 FM
- Branding: Adictivo Radio

Ownership
- Owner: Grupo Radiofónico Laguna (Organización Radiofónica Mexicana); (Radiodifusora XEBP-AM, S.A. de C.V.)
- Operator: GPS Media

History
- First air date: August 31, 1939

Technical information
- Class: B1
- ERP: 25 kW
- Transmitter coordinates: 25°34′00″N 103°28′00″W

Links
- Webcast: Listen live
- Website: gpsmedia.com.mx

XHBP-FM is a radio station on 90.3 FM in Gómez Palacio, Durango, Mexico. The station is operated by GPS Media and known as Adictivo Radio.

== History ==
XHBP began as XEBP-AM 1150, with a concession awarded in 1936 to Manuel Cano Maldonado but operated by Alejandro O. Stevenson Torrijos. It was the second station to come to air in the Comarca Lagunera, with a formal inauguration on August 31, 1939. The station broadcast on 1260 in the 1940s. By the 1950s, it was owned by La Voz de la Laguna, S.A. and had moved to 1450.

The station had been owned by Radio S.A. and Radiorama. Its transmitter remains at the Radiorama Laguna broadcast site in Gómez Palacio.

XEBP received authorization to move to FM as XHBP-FM 90.3 in 2011.

Until January 2015, XHBP carried the La Más Buena grupera format.

In 2019, Multimedios Radio took control of the entire Radio Centro Torreón cluster; Radio Recuerdo moved to XHWN-FM 93.9. XHBP then became known as "Stereo Vida" until it was leased out again, this time to new local group GPS Media, becoming Adictivo Radio in March 2020.
