= XHML-FM =

Radio station in León, Guanajuato

- León, Guanajuato; Mexico
- Frequency: 90.3 MHz (HD Radio)
- Branding: La Bestia Grupera

Programming
- Format: Regional Mexican

Ownership
- Owner: Grupo Audiorama Comunicaciones; (XHML-FM, S.A. de C.V.)
- Sister stations: XHVLO-FM, XHERZ-FM

History
- First air date: November 28, 1988 (concession)

Technical information
- Class: B
- ERP: 37.96 kW
- HAAT: 107.7 meters (353 ft)
- Transmitter coordinates: 21°09′36.0″N 101°42′58.5″W

Links
- Website: www.audioramabajio.mx/labestiagrupera/

XHML-FM is a radio station on 90.3 FM in León, Guanajuato. XHML is owned by Grupo Audiorama Comunicaciones and is known as La Bestia Grupera, carrying a Regional Mexican format.

== History ==
XHML received its concession on November 28, 1988 and has always been owned by a Radiorama component. For nearly thirty years, it was known as Estéreo Vida with a Spanish adult contemporary format.

On April 23, 2018, XHML shed its longtime format and name and was relaunched as a Regional Mexican station La Bestia Grupera, taking the Audiorama format, as part of Audiorama's entrance into León.
