= XEFRTM-AM =

Radio station in Fresnillo, Zacatecas, Mexico

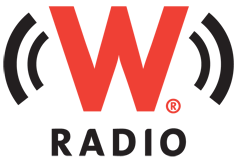
- Fresnillo, Zacatecas; Mexico
- Broadcast area: Zacatecas City
- Frequency: 770 AM
- Branding: W Radio

Programming
- Format: News/talk
- Affiliations: Radiópolis

Ownership
- Owner: GlobalMedia; (Transmisiones Mik, S.A. de C.V.)
- Operator: NTR Medios de Comunicación

History
- First air date: 2020
- Call sign meaning: FResnillo / Transmisiones Mik

Technical information
- Licensing authority: CRT
- Class: B
- Power: 25 kW
- Transmitter coordinates: 22°45′56.5″N 102°40′02.2″W

Links
- Webcast: Listen live
- Website: globalmedia.mx

XEFRTM-AM is a radio station on 770 AM in Fresnillo, Zacatecas, Mexico. It is owned by GlobalMedia operated by NTR Medios de Comunicación and is known as W Radio with programming from W Radio. The transmitter site is located southwest of Zacatecas.

== History ==
XEFRTM was awarded in the IFT-4 radio auction of 2017 and is one of three stations GlobalMedia companies obtained in the auction. The frequency had previously been occupied by XEIH-AM, which migrated to FM as XHIH-FM 103.3.
