= XHVLO-FM =

Radio station in Guanajuato, Guanajuato

Guanajuato City, Guanajuato, Mexico; Mexico
- Frequency: 101.5 FM
- Branding: Love FM

Programming
- Format: Romantic

Ownership
- Owner: Grupo Audiorama Comunicaciones; (Promotora de la Comunicación, S.A.)
- Sister stations: XHERZ-FM, XHML-FM

History
- First air date: November 26, 1980 (concession)

Technical information
- Class: B
- ERP: 10 kW
- HAAT: 256.92 meters (842.9 ft)
- Transmitter coordinates: 21°03′22.0″N 101°20′30.4″W

Links
- Webcast: Listen live
- Website: audioramabajio.mx/love

XHVLO-FM is a radio station on 101.5 FM in Guanajuato City, Guanajuato. XHVLO is owned by Grupo Audiorama Comunicaciones and carries an oldies format known as Love FM.

== History ==
XHVLO received its concession on November 26, 1980. It was owned by Doris Laura Jiménez Díaz.

In April 2018, operation of the station transferred to Grupo Audiorama Comunicaciones from Radiorama Bajío, resulting in the replacement of the "Tu Recuerdo" oldies format with a relaunched romantic format as Love FM.
