= Juan Aldama Municipality =

Municipality in the Mexican state of Zacatecas

Juan Aldama

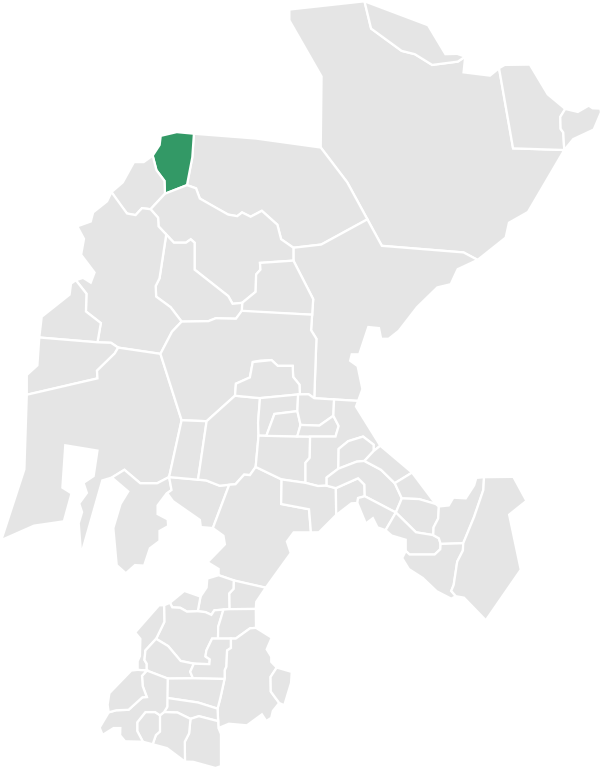
Location of Juan Aldama (municipality) in Zacatecas

Municipality of Juan Aldama
Foundation date
1591
State
Zacatecas, Mexico
Population
19,387 (2000)
Biggest Cities/Towns
Juan Aldama

Ojitos de Santa Lucia

Juan Jose Rios

Espíritu Santo

Altitude
2023 m
Coordinates
24°18′N 103°20′W
Time Zone
Central
_{Source:CONAPO}

The Municipality of Juan Aldama was named in honor of the insurgent Juan Aldama, who participated alongside Miguel Hidalgo in the Mexican War of Independence. It is also the name of the biggest community in the municipality.

== Picture ==
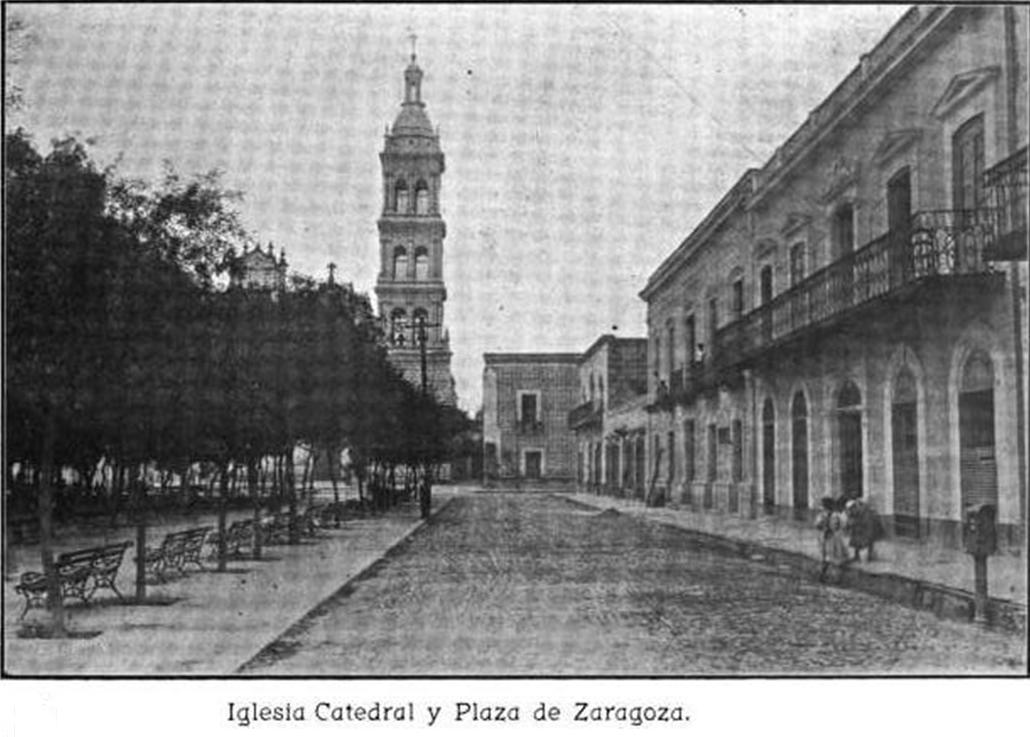

== Cities and Towns ==
- 7 de Marzo 98304
- Bosques del Pedregal 98303
- El Mezquite 98307
- Espiritú Santo 98320
- Gral Juan Jose Rios 98310
- Jalpa 98311
- Juan Aldama 98300
- Las Jarillas 98304
- Las Auroras 98303
- Magisterial 98307
- Nuevo Amanecer 98303
- Ojitos de Santa Lucia 98310
- Oriente 98303
- Valle Verde 98307
- Villa Arechiga 98307
- Morelos
