= XHPAPA-FM =

Radio station in Papantla, Veracruz

- Papantla, Veracruz; Mexico
- Frequency: 90.3 FM
- Branding: La Voz del Totonacapan

Programming
- Format: Cultural

Ownership
- Owner: El Aprendizaje Es Para Todos, A.C.

History
- First air date: August 1, 2012 (permit)
- Call sign meaning: PAPAntla

Technical information
- ERP: 2.88 kW

XHPAPA-FM is a noncommercial radio station on 90.3 FM in Papantla de Olarte, Veracruz. It is owned by El Aprendizaje Es Para Todos, A.C., and is part of the Radio Voces de Veracruz network of permit stations in northern Veracruz, operating as La Voz del Totonacapan.

== History ==
XHPAPA was permitted on August 1, 2012.
