= XHGD-FM =

Radio station in Hidalgo del Parral, Chihuahua

- Hidalgo del Parral, Chihuahua; Mexico
- Frequency: 90.3 FM
- Branding: La Poderosa

Programming
- Format: Regional Mexican
- Affiliations: Grupo Radiorama

Ownership
- Owner: Salayandia family; (Radio Parralense, S.A. de C.V.)

History
- First air date: August 19, 1952

Technical information
- Licensing authority: CRT
- Class: B1
- ERP: 25 kW
- HAAT: 44.3 m (145 ft)
- Transmitter coordinates: 26°55′22″N 105°38′32″W

Links
- Webcast: Listen live
- Website: lapoderosadeparral.com.mx

XHGD-FM is a radio station on 90.3 FM in Hidalgo del Parral, Chihuahua, Mexico. It is owned by the Salayandia family and is known as La Poderosa with a Regional Mexican format.

== History ==
XEGD-AM received its concession and signed on August 19, 1952. It originally broadcast on 1400 kHz with 1,000 watts and was owned by Domingo Salayandia Nájera, though at one point it also operated on 1520 kHz. In the 1990s, XEGD moved from 1400 to 700, and in 2003, it increased its power to 5,000 watts.

On its sixtieth anniversary, XHGD-FM was brought into service on 90.3 MHz; the new station was dedicated by Governor César Duarte.
