= KCTZ =

Radio station in San Lucas, California

- San Lucas, California; United States
- Frequency: 90.3 MHz
- Branding: Radio Resplandecer

Programming
- Language: Spanish
- Format: Christian

Ownership
- Owner: Iglesia de Jesucristo, en King City, Ca., Inc.

History
- First air date: July 16, 2012

Technical information
- Licensing authority: FCC
- Facility ID: 174362
- Class: A
- ERP: 600 watts
- HAAT: −72 meters (−236 ft)
- Transmitter coordinates: 36°08′9″N 121°01′36″W

Links
- Public license information: Public file; LMS
- Webcast: Listen live
- Website: radioresplandecer.com

KCTZ (90.3 FM) is a class A Spanish-language radio station broadcasting a Christian radio format from San Lucas, California.

== History ==
KCTZ began broadcasting on July 16, 2012.
