= WUTM =

Radio station of the University of Tennessee at Martin

- Martin, Tennessee; United States
- Frequency: 90.3 MHz
- Branding: The Hawk

Programming
- Format: Contemporary hit radio

Ownership
- Owner: The University of Tennessee

History
- Call sign meaning: The University of Tennessee at Martin

Technical information
- Licensing authority: FCC
- Facility ID: 66572
- Class: A
- ERP: 175 watts
- HAAT: 76 meters (249 ft)
- Transmitter coordinates: 36°20′28.00″N 88°51′39.00″W

Links
- Public license information: Public file; LMS
- Webcast: Listen live
- Website: Official website

WUTM (90.3 FM) is a radio station broadcasting a contemporary hit radio format. Licensed to Martin, Tennessee, United States, the station serves the University of Tennessee at Martin campus. The station is owned by The University of Tennessee.
