= CHYH-FM =

Coordinates: 69°32′15″N 093°31′17″W

- Taloyoak, Nunavut; Canada
- Frequency: 90.3 MHz

Programming
- Format: First Nations community radio

Ownership
- Owner: Taloyoakmiut Nipingit Society

History
- First air date: August 1, 2003

Technical information
- ERP: 43 watts
- HAAT: 25 metres

CHYH-FM is a radio station that broadcasts on a frequency of 90.3 FM in Taloyoak, Nunavut, Canada.

The station is owned by Taloyoakmiut Nipingit Society.
