= WYRV =

- Cedar Bluff, Virginia; United States
- Broadcast area: Southwestern Virginia
- Frequency: 770 kHz
- Branding: "WYRV AM 770"

Programming
- Format: Variety

Ownership
- Owner: Faith Communications, Inc.

History
- First air date: 1985
- Call sign meaning: W Your Radio Virginia

Technical information
- Licensing authority: FCC
- Facility ID: 9709
- Class: D
- Power: 5,000 Watts daytime only
- Transmitter coordinates: 37°5′5.0″N 81°46′7.0″W
- Translators: W236DQ (95.1 MHz, Cedar Bluff)

Links
- Public license information: Public file; LMS

WYRV is a Variety-formatted broadcast radio station licensed to Cedar Bluff, Virginia, serving Southwestern Virginia. WYRV is owned and operated by Faith Communications, Inc.

== Technical Specifications ==
WYRV is a AM radio station and it operates on a frequency of 770 kHz. The station is analog and has no digital data. The power 5.0 kw and is a daytime, non directional station.
