= WDIH =

- Salisbury, Maryland; United States
- Frequency: 90.3 MHz
- Branding: 90.3 WDIH

Programming
- Format: Urban Gospel

Ownership
- Owner: Salisbury Educational Broadcasting Foundation

History
- Call sign meaning: Deliverance is Here

Technical information
- Licensing authority: FCC
- Facility ID: 58655
- Class: A
- ERP: 3,800 watts
- HAAT: 55.0 meters
- Transmitter coordinates: 38°24′28.00″N 75°36′16.00″W

Links
- Public license information: Public file; LMS
- Webcast: wdihradio90-3.org

WDIH (90.3 FM) is a radio station broadcasting an urban gospel format. Licensed to Salisbury, Maryland, United States, the station is currently owned by the Salisbury Educational Broadcasting Foundation.
