= WUIT-LP =

Low-power radio station in Durham, North Carolina

- Durham, North Carolina; United States
- Frequency: 90.3 MHz
- Branding: Radio Transformación

Programming
- Language: Spanish
- Format: Christian radio

Ownership
- Owner: Ministerio Guerrero de Jesucristo Internacional, Inc.

History
- First air date: February 23, 2018

Technical information
- Licensing authority: FCC
- Facility ID: 193736
- Class: L1
- ERP: 100 watts
- HAAT: 14 meters (46 ft)
- Transmitter coordinates: 35°47′8.8″N 78°47′33.6″W

Links
- Public license information: LMS
- Website: facebook.com/radiotransformacionfm

WUIT-LP (90.3 FM) is a low-power FM station in Durham, North Carolina, United States. The station serves downtown Durham, and the fringe coverage area reaches to around the Raleigh-Durham International Airport (RDU). WUIT-LP began broadcasting on February 23, 2018. The transmitting facilitates are located at 36.013205°N 78.890454°W.
