= KLAI =

- Laytonville, California; United States
- Broadcast area: Fort Bragg-Ukiah
- Frequency: 90.3 MHz

Ownership
- Owner: Redwood Community Radio Inc

Technical information
- Licensing authority: FCC
- Facility ID: 85065
- Class: B
- ERP: 500 watts
- HAAT: 741.0 meters (2,431.1 ft)
- Transmitter coordinates: 39°41′38″N 123°34′43″W

Links
- Public license information: Public file; LMS
- Webcast: Listen live
- Website: kmud.org

KLAI (90.3 FM) is a radio station licensed to Laytonville, California, United States, and serves the Fort Bragg-Ukiah area. The station is currently owned by Redwood Community Radio Inc.
