= XHZTS-FM =

Radio station in Zacatecas, Zacatecas

- Zacatecas City, Zacatecas; Mexico
- Frequency: 91.5 FM
- Branding: Estéreo Plata

Programming
- Format: Pop

Ownership
- Owner: Grupo Plata Radio; (Juan Enríquez Rivera)
- Sister stations: XHGAP-FM

History
- First air date: April 26, 1991
- Call sign meaning: ZacaTecaS

Technical information
- Licensing authority: CRT
- Class: B
- ERP: 50 kW
- HAAT: 79.5 m (261 ft)

Links
- Webcast: Listen live
- Website: estereoplata.com

XHZTS-FM is a radio station on 91.5 FM in Zacatecas City, Zacatecas, Mexico. The station is owned by Grupo Plata Radio and is known as Estéreo Plata.

== History ==
XHZTS received its concession on April 26, 1991. It was owned by Francisco Esparza Acevedo. That same day XHZTS and sister station XHGAP-FM 94.7 signed on, this station signing on five minutes after its sister.

In February 2014, XHZTS and XHGAP moved to new facilities.

== Programming ==
XHZTS programming consists in music hits ranging from the 1970s to present day. It also offers news, and coverage of civic and political events.

The station broadcasts all Mineros de Zacatecas home matches in Liga de Expansión MX.
