= WSSB-FM =

Radio station at South Carolina State University in Orangeburg, South Carolina

- Orangeburg, South Carolina; United States
- Frequency: 90.3 MHz
- Branding: Jazz 90.3 FM- WSSB

Programming
- Format: Jazz
- Affiliations: National Public Radio; American Urban Radio Network

Ownership
- Owner: South Carolina State University

History
- First air date: March 15, 1985
- Call sign meaning: South (Carolina) State Bulldogs

Technical information
- Licensing authority: FCC
- Facility ID: 60972
- Class: C1
- ERP: 80,000 watts (horizontal polarization); 72,000 watts (vertical polarization)
- HAAT: 66 meters (217 ft)
- Transmitter coordinates: 33°29′55″N 80°50′30″W

Links
- Public license information: Public file; LMS

WSSB-FM (90.3 MHz) is a non-commercial FM radio station in Orangeburg, South Carolina. It is owned by South Carolina State University, an historically black university. WSSB-FM carries a jazz radio format and calls itself "South Carolina's Jazz Station." Students and volunteers present the music, with some syndicated jazz programming coming from National Public Radio and other public broadcasting sources.

WSSB-FM has an effective radiated power (ERP) of 80,000 watts (horizontal polarization) and 72,000 watts (vertical polarization). The radio studios are on College Street in Orangeburg.

== History ==
The station signed on the air on March 15, 1985.
