= KBUB =

- Brownwood, Texas; United States
- Frequency: 90.3 MHz
- Branding: Country Gospel 90.3

Programming
- Format: Country Gospel
- Affiliations: Salem Communications

Ownership
- Owner: BLM of Brownwood

Technical information
- Licensing authority: FCC
- Facility ID: 14510
- Class: A
- ERP: 5,500 watts
- HAAT: 88.0 meters (288.7 ft)
- Transmitter coordinates: 31°43′10″N 99°0′57″W

Links
- Public license information: Public file; LMS
- Webcast: Listen live
- Website: https://www.kbubfm.net/

KBUB (90.3 FM) is a radio station broadcasting a country gospel music format. Licensed to Brownwood, Texas, United States, the station is currently owned by Blm of Brownwood and features programming from Salem Communications.

== History ==
On December 23, 2005, the station was sold to Living Word Church Of Brownwood and on March 27, 2008, the station was sold to BLM of Brownwood.
