= KBJS =

Radio station in Jacksonville, Texas

- Jacksonville, Texas; United States
- Broadcast area: Tyler-Longview area
- Frequency: 90.3 MHz
- Branding: 90.3 KBJS

Programming
- Format: Christian radio

Ownership
- Owner: East Texas Media Association, Inc.

History
- First air date: June 6, 1988

Technical information
- Licensing authority: FCC
- Facility ID: 18259
- Class: C1
- ERP: 16,000 watts
- HAAT: 392.0 meters (1,286.1 ft)
- Transmitter coordinates: 32°3′40″N 95°18′50″W

Links
- Public license information: Public file; LMS
- Website: kbjs.org

KBJS (90.3 FM) is a radio station broadcasting a Christian radio format. Licensed to Jacksonville, Texas, United States, the station serves the Tyler-Longview area. The station is currently owned by East Texas Media Association, Inc.

Former logo
