= XHGAP-FM =

Radio station in Guadalupe, Zacatecas

- Guadalupe, Zacatecas; Mexico
- Frequency: 94.7 FM
- Branding: Súper G

Programming
- Format: Regional Mexican

Ownership
- Owner: Grupo Plata Radio; (Juan Enríquez Rivera)
- Sister stations: XHZTS-FM

History
- First air date: April 26, 1991
- Call sign meaning: GuAdaluPe

Technical information
- Licensing authority: CRT
- Class: B
- ERP: 50 kW
- HAAT: −17.9 m (−59 ft)

Links
- Webcast: Listen live
- Website: supergfm.com

XHGAP-FM is a radio station on 94.7 FM in Guadalupe, Zacatecas. The station is owned by Grupo Plata Radio and carries a Regional Mexican format known as Súper G.

== History ==
XHGAP received its concession on April 26, 1991. It was owned by Manuel de Alva Peña. That same day XHGAP and its sister station XHZTS-FM 91.5 signed on, this station signing on just five minutes before its sister station.

In February 2014, XHGAP and XHZTS were moved to new facilities.

== Programming ==
XHGAP broadcasts a Regional Mexican music format. It also has live talk and entertainment shows, mainly in the morning, the audience can call into the shows, participate in contests and games, send greetings and ask for songs.

94.7 was the radio play-by-play home of the Mineros de Zacatecas home games in the LNBP basketball league.
