= KATL (AM) =

Radio station in Miles City, Montana, US

- Miles City, Montana; United States
- Broadcast area: Eastern Montana
- Frequency: 770 kHz
- Branding: 770 KATL

Programming
- Format: Adult contemporary
- Affiliations: ABC News Radio, Westwood One

Ownership
- Owner: Yellowstone Newspapers Group

History
- First air date: September 9, 1941 (as KRJF at 1340)
- Former call signs: KRJF (1941–1955)
- Former frequencies: 1340 kHz (1941–1987)

Technical information
- Facility ID: 62297
- Class: B
- Power: 10,000 watts (day); 1,000 watts (night)
- Transmitter coordinates: 46°23′46″N 105°46′46″W

Links
- Webcast: KATL Webstream
- Website: KATL Online

KATL (770 AM) is a radio station licensed to serve Miles City, Montana. The station is owned by the Yellowstone Newspapers Group, and managed by Don Richard. It airs an Adult Contemporary music format, as well as local and state news, local sports, and several other programs.

Miles City is known as the "Cow Capitol of the West" and this is reflected in the KATL (pronounced "Cattle") callsign. The station was assigned the KATL call letters by the Federal Communications Commission.

== History ==
KATL first aired September 9, 1941 under the call letters KRJF. At the time, they were a 1,000-watt Class D station on the frequency of 1340 AM. After being purchased by Star Printing Company, the call letters were changed to KATL and they began to broadcast at 250-watts at night as well. In 1985, KATL changed its broadcasting to 10,000-watts during the daytime, and 1,000-watts at night. They also changed the frequency to 770 AM at this time. KATL continues to broadcast on this frequency and power today, covering several counties in Southeastern Montana.

Many popular local personalities were on the air including Fred Hunnes, Terry Virag, Skip Walters, and more. Local programming included the popular Party Line program, an on-air call-in show which usually featured regular callers discussing the issues of the day.

As of October 1961, Ian Elliott was the manager of the radio station.

== Programs ==
KATL currently airs Dial Global adult contemporary throughout the day. Wednesday mornings at 10 am there is a local-interest program, KATL Live, during which Don Richard interviews guests regarding upcoming events in Miles City and the surrounding area. These interviews are available on the KATL website for 3 weeks after airing.

Throughout the day, several programs air during commercial breaks, including Kookin' With Karla (a cooking program that includes at least 3 recipes per week in a rotation), a community calendar, and local and state news with Andrew Bern, the station's news director. Bern also serves as the station's sports director, anchoring daily sportscasts as well as serving as the play-by-play broadcaster for Cowboys and Cowgirls athletics. Monday through Friday, the Clark Howard radio program airs from 3 pm to 5 pm.

Throughout the school year, KATL runs a 2-minute Athlete of the Week program every Thursday for high school students from Miles City and the surrounding area. At the end of the school year, one male and one female athlete are chosen from the Athletes of the Week to be the recipients of the Athlete of the Year award during a banquet held in May. These athletes are all given plaques, donated by the Bozeman Trophy, and copies of the program that aired on KATL during the week in which they were honored.

KATL also holds an annual radio auction during July and a Pumpkin Chase in October, as well as several contests and giveaways throughout the year.
