= WKRB =

Radio station in Brooklyn, New York

- Brooklyn, New York; United States
- Frequency: 90.3 MHz
- Branding: 90.3 WKRB

Programming
- Language: English
- Format: Rhythmic contemporary

Ownership
- Owner: Kingsborough Community College
- Sister stations: WHCR-FM, WSIA

History
- First air date: May 28, 1978
- Call sign meaning: We're Kingsborough's Radio for Brooklyn!

Technical information
- Licensing authority: FCC
- Facility ID: 34902
- Class: D
- ERP: 10 watts
- HAAT: 40.7 meters
- Transmitter coordinates: 40°34′36.00″N 73°56′4.00″W

Links
- Public license information: Public file; LMS
- Webcast: Listen live
- Website: wkrb.org

WKRB (90.3 FM) is an FM radio station licensed to Brooklyn, New York. It is a music based station based at and controlled by Kingsborough Community College, with a transmitter in Manhattan Beach. It also is the official station of the Brooklyn Cyclones, and is a broadcast partner of the New York Islanders hockey club. In 2006, WKRB changed its frequency from 90.9 MHz to 90.3 MHz, but kept its call sign.

== History ==
WKRB went on the air in 1978 at 90.9 MHz. In 1980, the station filed to move to 103.1; the move was challenged by WNEW-FM at 102.7 and WAPP 103.5 because of interference in their protected primary contour. Though the station briefly broadcast on 103.1, the action by the other stations eventually led to the move being denied and the station returning to 90.9. While at 103.1, the on-air talent was most competitive to even commercial stations. WKRB moved in 2006 to 90.3 FM, a frequency change necessitated by upgrades at WFUV 90.7. An initial application for 91.9 was denied; the FCC approved the 90.3 application despite minor interference concerns because no other FM channels were available.

On-air personalities included William "Kid Willy" McFarland, who served as the general manager and was eventually on Z100 in New York under the name "Spanky McFarland" before his death, Vincent "The King" Soriano, also known as Johnny Thunder during his brief stint at WPRO-FM was also the Program Director during this period, and was recently at WSIA-FM, Mich Kaufman, briefly at WLVA in Lynchburg, Virginia, Big Dave Neel, Stanley "Stan The Man" Evans, Patrick "Pat The Cat" Phillips (now Kid Kelly) who is still at Z100 New York as the host and creator of his very own syndicated classic hits show called "Backtrax U.S.A.", and as the VP of music programming here at Sirius/XM Satellite Radio and Sirius/XM Hits 1, Lenny Green now on WBLS, Skeery Jones Producer on Elvis Duran and the Morning Show, Ruby Tuesday currently on Electric FM (originally from the "B91" days was also heard on WNYZ PULSE 87, WNEW 102.7 FM, 77 WABC, and WXXP PARTY 105 to name a few), Yo Sunny Joe Allen a frequent New York City Radio Personality has been heard on WBLS, WQHT, WKTU and now heard on WGNY-FM 98.9 Poughkeepsie.

During the "glory days", a morning show, which preceded the famous "Zoo" shows of the mid-80s, was created.

The college held its 30th Anniversary Celebration of the radio station in May 2008.

== Awards ==
In 2013 the station won the Intercollegiate Broadcasting System award for "Best Community College Radio Station".
