= WUTK-FM =

Student radio station at the University of Tennessee Knoxville

- Knoxville, Tennessee; United States
- Broadcast area: Metro Knoxville
- Frequency: 90.3 MHz
- Branding: Volunteer Radio — 90.3 The Rock

Programming
- Language: English
- Format: College rock, Alternative rock, Indie rock, Synthpop, Americana, Funk, Soul, Hip-Hop, Rap

Ownership
- Owner: University of Tennessee

History
- First air date: January 1982
- Former call signs: WUTK (1981–1988)
- Call sign meaning: University of Tennessee, Knoxville

Technical information
- Licensing authority: FCC
- Facility ID: 69329
- Class: A
- ERP: 2,400 watts
- HAAT: 26 meters (85 ft)
- Transmitter coordinates: 35°57′7.00″N 83°55′33.00″W

Links
- Public license information: Public file; LMS
- Webcast: WUTK Webstream
- Website: WUTK Online

WUTK-FM is a variety formatted non-commercial, non-profit, broadcast radio station licensed to Knoxville, Tennessee and serving Metro Knoxville. WUTK is owned and operated by the University of Tennessee; however, WUTK's daily operations are not funded by the university; instead, they rely on donations from listeners and local businesses. WUTK-FM signed on in February 1982 from studios located in P-103 of Andy Holt Tower with an antenna on the roof generating 128.7 watts. WUTK now streams worldwide at WUTKRadio.com and on the WUTK, Tune In and RadioFX apps.

All music, news 90 and sports shows on WUTK are volunteer or student-produced, hence nicknamed "Volunteer Radio — 90.3 The Rock" with slogans that include "UT's College of Rock" & "Knoxville's Musical Tastemakers". Previous nicknames associated with WUTK are "Album 90", "New Rock 90", "The Last One Left" & "The Torch".

== Awards and recognition ==
The station has received numerous awards and honors from various media outlets including Knoxville News Sentinel, Blank Newspaper, Metro Pulse and College Music Journal.

For 17 years in a row (2005–2022), WUTK has been voted "Knoxville's Best Radio Station" by three different local publications.

In 2020, WUTK's Twitter & Instagram accounts @WUTKTheRock were named "Knoxville's Finest" by the readers of Blank News.

As of May 2022, WUTK is installing a new 1,000 watt transmitter, purchased with donations from students and listeners.
