= WGCR =

- Pisgah Forest, North Carolina; United States
- Broadcast area: Asheville area
- Frequency: 720 kHz
- Branding: Gospel Carolina Radio

Programming
- Format: Christian radio

Ownership
- Owner: Anchor Baptist Broadcasting Association

History
- First air date: 1984

Technical information
- Licensing authority: FCC
- Facility ID: 2198
- Class: D
- Power: 50,000 watts day 15,000 watts critical hours
- Transmitter coordinates: 35°15′06″N 82°40′32″W
- Translator: 94.9 W235CA (Pisgah Forest)

Links
- Public license information: Public file; LMS
- Webcast: Listen Live
- Website: wgcr.net

WGCR (720 AM) is a radio station broadcasting a Christian radio format. Located in Pisgah Forest, North Carolina, the station serves the Asheville area, but can be heard in upstate South Carolina and extreme northeast Georgia as well. The station is owned and operated by Anchor Baptist Broadcasting Inc.

Because it shares the same frequency as clear channel station WGN in Chicago, WGCR broadcasts sunrise to sunset only. The FM translator on 94.9 MHz is allowed by the FCC to broadcast unlimited hours.
