= KZJB =

Radio station in Pocatello, Idaho

- Pocatello, Idaho; United States
- Broadcast area: Pocatello area
- Frequency: 90.3 MHz

Programming
- Format: Christian contemporary

Ownership
- Owner: Watersprings Ministries
- Sister stations: KYSK

History
- First air date: April 10, 1998 (as KAWS)
- Former call signs: KAWS (1998–1998)

Technical information
- Licensing authority: FCC
- Facility ID: 90463
- Class: C3
- ERP: 910 watts
- HAAT: 314.4 meters (1,031 ft)
- Transmitter coordinates: 42°51′46″N 112°31′3″W
- Translator: 90.1 K211BD (Idaho Falls)

Links
- Public license information: Public file; LMS
- Webcast: Listen Live
- Website: therev.fm

KZJB (90.3 FM) is a radio station broadcasting a Christian contemporary format. Licensed to Pocatello, Idaho, United States, the station serves the Pocatello area. The station is owned by Watersprings Ministries.

== History ==
The station went on the air as KAWS on 1998-04-10. On 2005-06-29 the station became the current KZJB.
