= XHFRE-FM =

Radio station in Fresnillo, Zacatecas, Mexico

- Fresnillo, Zacatecas; Mexico
- Frequency: 100.5 FM
- Branding: Exa FM

Programming
- Format: Top 40 (CHR)
- Affiliations: MVS Radio

Ownership
- Owner: Grupo B15; (La Primera FM, S.A. de C.V.)
- Sister stations: XHQS-FM, XHEMA-FM

History
- First air date: July 27, 1993 (concession)
- Call sign meaning: FREsnillo

Technical information
- Licensing authority: CRT
- Class: C1
- ERP: 100 kW
- HAAT: 31.4 m (103 ft)

Links
- Webcast: Listen live
- Website: exafm.com

XHFRE-FM is a radio station in Fresnillo, Zacatecas, Mexico. Broadcasting on 100.5 FM, XHFRE is owned by Grupo B15 and carries the national Exa FM format from MVS Radio.

== History ==
The station's concession was awarded in 1993 to Jesús Antonio Bonilla Elizondo.
