= KVLA-FM =

KPCC public radio station in Coachella, California, United States

Simulcasts KPCC, Pasadena, CA
- Coachella, California; United States
- Broadcast area: Palm Springs / Coachella Valley
- Frequency: 90.3 MHz (HD Radio)

Programming
- Format: Public radio and talk
- Subchannels: HD2: Alternative rock (KCMP)
- Affiliations: Southern California Public Radio, NPR, APM

Ownership
- Owner: American Public Media Group; (Southern California Public Radio)
- Sister stations: KPCC, KUOR-FM

History
- First air date: February 2005
- Former call signs: KBXO (2003–2008); KPCV (2008–2011)

Technical information
- Licensing authority: FCC
- Facility ID: 85911
- Class: A
- ERP: 340 watts
- HAAT: 175 meters (574 ft)
- Transmitter coordinates: 33°48′8″N 116°13′30″W

Links
- Public license information: Public file; LMS
- Website: kpcc.org/about/public/kpcv

KVLA-FM (90.3 FM) is a public radio station owned by American Public Media Group, through its Southern California Public Radio subsidiary. Licensed to Coachella, California, United States, it serves Palm Springs, the Coachella Valley, and surrounding areas as a simulcast of KPCC (89.3 FM) in Pasadena.

== History ==
The 90.3 frequency in Coachella was first filed for in March 1997. A construction permit was granted in February 2003, and the call sign KBXO was selected on February 18 as its owner readied it to become a fully licensed radio station. In February 2005, the station signed on with a Christian radio format from the Oasis Network; it was owned by the Creative Educational Media Corp.

The Creative Educational Media Corp. sold KBXO to American Public Media Group for $1 million in June 2008. On August 22, 2008, the Christian format was dropped and the station started acting as a satellite for KPCC. The call sign was changed to KPCV with the change in format. The call sign was changed again on October 14, 2011, to the current KVLA-FM.
