= XHQS-FM =

Radio station in Fresnillo, Zacatecas

- Fresnillo, Zacatecas; Mexico
- Frequency: 90.3 MHz
- Branding: Romántica 90.3 FM

Programming
- Format: Spanish adult hits

Ownership
- Owner: Grupo Radiofónico B-15; (Radiodifusora XEQS 930 AM, S.A. de C.V.)
- Sister stations: XHFRE-FM, XHEMA-FM

History
- First air date: August 10, 1978 (concession)
- Former call signs: XEQS-AM
- Former frequencies: 980 kHz, 930 kHz

Technical information
- Licensing authority: CRT
- Class: B1
- ERP: 25,000 watts
- HAAT: 98.29 meters (322.5 ft)
- Transmitter coordinates: 23°08′31″N 102°49′58″W

Links
- Webcast: XEQS listen online
- Website: romantica.b15.com.mx

XHQS-FM is a radio station in Fresnillo, Zacatecas. It broadcasts on 90.3 FM and is owned by Grupo Radiofónico B-15, and carries a Spanish-language adult hits format known as Romántica.

== History ==
XEQS-AM received its concession on August 10, 1978. It was owned by José Bonilla Robles and broadcast as a 1 kW daytimer on 980 kHz. By the 1990s, XEQS was moved to 930, with a power of 10,000 watts during the day and 1,000-watts for nighttime service.

In 2011, XEQS was approved to migrate to FM with 25,000 watts.
