= XHEL-FM =

Radio station in Fresnillo, Zacatecas

- Fresnillo, Zacatecas; Mexico
- Frequency: 95.1 FM
- Branding: La Ele FM

Ownership
- Owner: Torres Corporativo; (Sucesión de Juana Gallegos Rojas)
- Sister stations: XHIH-FM

History
- First air date: January 30, 1959 (concession)
- Former call signs: XEEL-AM
- Former frequencies: 610 kHz

Technical information
- Licensing authority: CRT
- Class: C1
- ERP: 33.22 kW
- HAAT: 258.63 m (848.5 ft)
- Transmitter coordinates: 23°12′47.01″N 102°53′20.47″W

Links
- Webcast: XHEL-FM
- Website: www.laele.fm

XHEL-FM is a radio station on 95.1 FM in Fresnillo, Zacatecas, known as La Ele FM.

== History ==
XEEL-AM 610 received its concession on January 31, 1959. It was owned by José Antonio Casas Torres and broadcast with 1,000 watts day and 150 watts night. By the late 1960s, control was in the hands of José Antonio Casas García. On July 26, 2003, Casas García died; Juana Gallegos Rojas became the concessionaire. She has also since died.

XEEL was cleared to move to FM in February 2011, with its tower on Cerro Xoconostle. In 2015, XHEL-FM was approved to increase power to 33.22 kW.
