= WHCR-FM =

Radio station of City College of New York in New York City

- New York, New York; United States
- Frequency: 90.3 MHz
- Branding: The Voice of Harlem

Programming
- Format: College radio; community radio

Ownership
- Owner: City College of New York
- Sister stations: WKRB, WSIA

Technical information
- Licensing authority: FCC
- Facility ID: 11412
- Class: D
- ERP: 8 watts
- HAAT: 81 meters (266 ft)
- Transmitter coordinates: 40°49′9.00″N 73°56′59.00″W

Links
- Public license information: Public file; LMS
- Website: whcr.org

WHCR-FM (90.3 FM) is a community radio station licensed to New York, New York. The station, owned by City College of New York, is known as "The Voice of Harlem".

== See also ==
- College radio
- List of college radio stations in the United States
