= KLWO =

- Longview, Washington; United States
- Frequency: 90.3 MHz
- Branding: K-Love

Programming
- Format: Contemporary Christian
- Affiliations: K-Love

Ownership
- Owner: Educational Media Foundation

History
- First air date: 1984 (as KZOE)
- Former call signs: KZOE (1984–2003); KWYQ (2003–2010)

Technical information
- Licensing authority: FCC
- Facility ID: 12440
- Class: A
- ERP: 400 watts
- HAAT: 272 meters (892 ft)
- Transmitter coordinates: 46°9′47″N 122°51′14″W
- Translator: 101.7 K269FS (Centralia)

Links
- Public license information: Public file; LMS
- Webcast: Listen live
- Website: klove.com

KLWO (90.3 FM, "K-Love") is a radio station broadcasting a Contemporary Christian music format. Licensed to Longview, Washington, United States, the station is currently owned by Educational Media Foundation.
