= XHEMA-FM =

Radio station in Fresnillo, Zacatecas, Mexico

XHEMA-FM/XEMA-AM
- Fresnillo, Zacatecas; Mexico
- Frequency: 107.9 MHz/690 kHz
- Branding: La Mejor

Programming
- Format: Regional Mexican
- Affiliations: MVS Radio

Ownership
- Owner: Grupo Radiofónico B-15; (Radiodifusora XEMA 690 AM, S.A. de C.V.)
- Sister stations: XHQS-FM, XHFRE-FM

History
- First air date: July 26, 1940
- Call sign meaning: José Miguel Acevedo Mora

Technical information
- Licensing authority: CRT
- Class: C1 (FM); B (AM)
- Power: 50 kw (day) 2 kw (night)
- ERP: 100 kW
- HAAT: 162.05 meters (531.7 ft)
- Transmitter coordinates: 23°08′29.0″N 102°49′58.7″W

Links
- Webcast: Listen live
- Website: lamejor.com.mx

XHEMA-FM/XEMA-AM is a radio station in Fresnillo, Zacatecas. Broadcasting on 107.9 FM, XHEMA/XEMA is owned by Grupo Radiofónico B-15 and carries the national La Mejor Regional Mexican format from MVS Radio.

== History ==
XEMA-AM received its concession on July 26, 1940. It was owned by José Miguel Acevedo Mora and broadcast on 1340 kHz.

On January 13, 1972, it was sold to Hilda Gómez de Bonilla, who moved the station to 690 kHz. The move also allowed the station to increase its daytime power from 1 kW to 10.

In 2011, XEMA received authorization to migrate to FM on 107.1 MHz, with the callsign XHEMA-FM. However, it did not remain on its new frequency long, as in September 2013, XHEMA was moved to 107.9 MHz and increased power to 100,000 watts.
