= Río Grande, Zacatecas =

Río Grande
- City & municipal seat
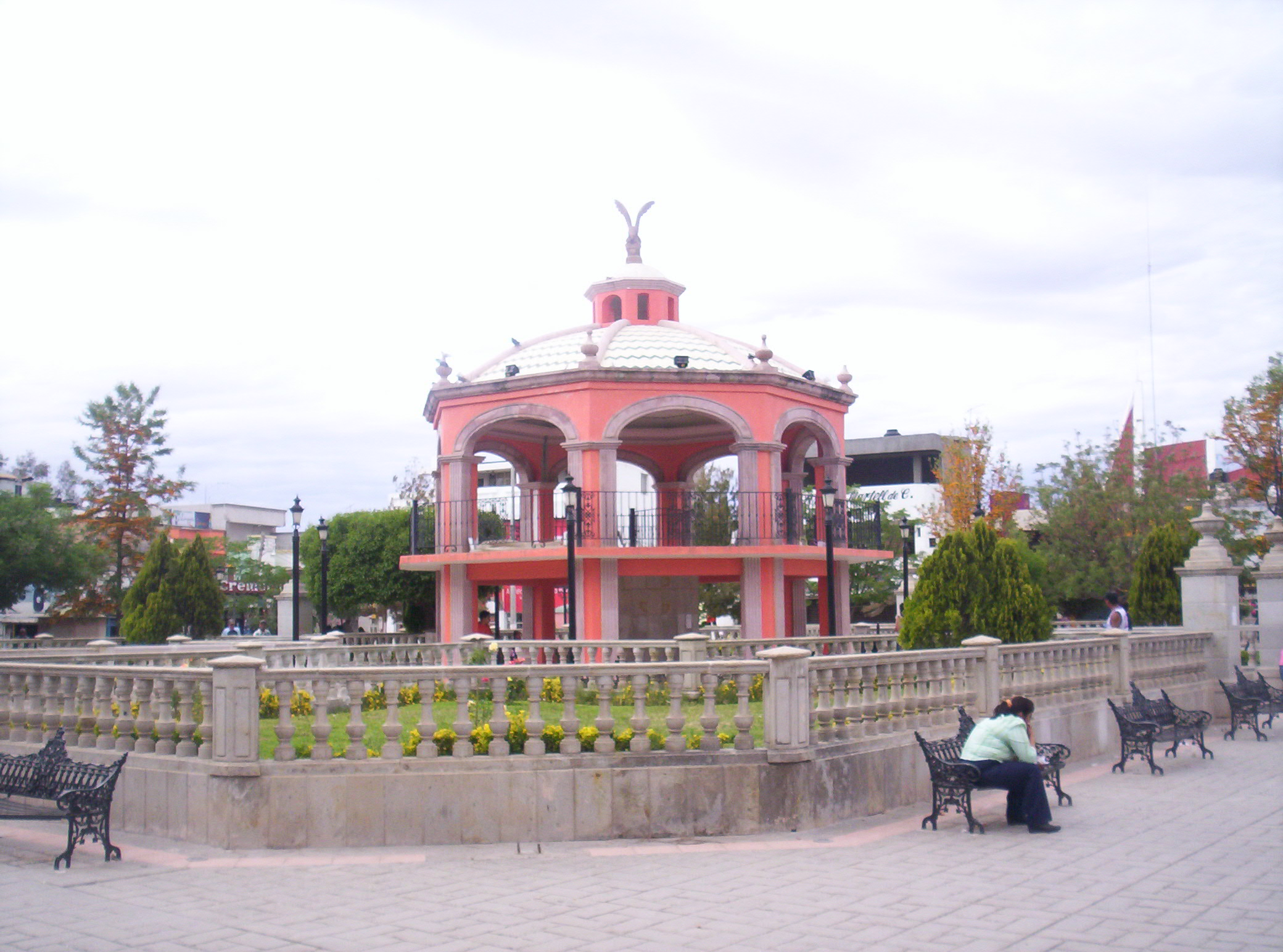
- Main plaza of the town of Río Grande

- Location of Río Grande Río Grande (Mexico)
- Coordinates: 23°49′21″N 103°02′10″W
- Country: Mexico
- State: Zacatecas
- Municipality: Río Grande
- Founded: 18 August 1562
- Elevation: 1,857 m (6,093 ft)

Population (2020)
  - Total: 35,050
- Area code: 498

Río Grande is a city in the Mexican state of Zacatecas. It serves as the municipal seat of the eponymous Río Grande Municipality. It is the fifth most populous city in the state, it is located in the north-central region of the state and has a population of 35,050 inhabitants, according to the 2020 Census. Río Grande is known as "El Granero de la Nación" for being one of the largest bean producers nationwide and also the largest trader of this legume in the country's predominant bean growing area.

== History ==
Prior to the arrival of the Spanish, the Río Grande area was inhabited by Chichimeca peoples such as the Guachichil and Irritila. Oral history holds that a Spanish settlement was founded at Río Grande on 18 August 1562. The town was recognized by the Royal Audiencia of Guadalajara on 5 March 1689 under the name Santa Elena de Río Grande.

Río Grande became the seat of its own namesake municipality, which was first incorporated as an ayuntamiento in the partido of Nieves in Zacatecas on 29 October 1833, and it became a free municipality on 19 August 1916.

== Climate ==
According to the Köppen climate classification, the climate of Río Grande has a warm semi-arid (Steppe climate).

Climate data for Río Grande Zacatecas (1,912 msnm), 1951-2010
Month	Jan	Feb	Mar	Apr	May	Jun	Jul	Aug	Sep	Oct	Nov	Dec	Year
Record high °C (°F)	28.5 (83.3)	29.5 (85.1)	34.0 (93.2)	35.0 (95.0)	38.0 (100.4)	39.0 (102.2)	38.5 (101.3)	32.0 (89.6)	31.0 (87.8)	33.0 (91.4)	29.5 (85.1)	29.0 (84.2)	39.0 (102.2)
Mean daily maximum °C (°F)	21.0 (69.8)	22.9 (73.2)	26.3 (79.3)	28.8 (83.8)	30.9 (87.6)	30.1 (86.2)	27.2 (81.0)	27.1 (80.8)	26.2 (79.2)	25.5 (77.9)	23.7 (74.7)	21.2 (70.2)	25.9 (78.6)
Daily mean °C (°F)	11.1 (52.0)	12.7 (54.9)	15.9 (60.6)	18.7 (65.7)	21.3 (70.3)	22.1 (71.8)	20.6 (69.1)	20.3 (68.5)	19.3 (66.7)	17.2 (63.0)	13.8 (56.8)	11.9 (53.4)	17.1 (62.8)
Mean daily minimum °C (°F)	1.3 (34.3)	2.5 (36.5)	5.4 (41.7)	8.6 (47.5)	11.7 (53.1)	14.1 (57.4)	14.0 (57.2)	13.6 (56.5)	12.4 (54.3)	8.9 (48.0)	3.8 (38.8)	2.6 (36.7)	8.2 (46.8)
Record low °C (°F)	−9.0 (15.8)	−7.0 (19.4)	−5.0 (23.0)	−5.0 (23.0)	5.0 (41.0)	8.5 (47.3)	10.0 (50.0)	9.0 (48.2)	3.0 (37.4)	−2.5 (27.5)	−7.0 (19.4)	−8.0 (17.6)	−9 (16)
Average precipitation mm (inches)	11.9 (0.47)	6.3 (0.25)	1.2 (0.05)	4.1 (0.16)	12.0 (0.47)	46.2 (1.82)	99.0 (3.90)	83.3 (3.28)	67.9 (2.67)	29.1 (1.15)	14.2 (0.56)	22.2 (0.87)	397.4 (15.65)
Average rainy days (≥ 0.1 mm)	2.2	1.2	0.4	1.1	2.3	7.1	10.4	11.4	8.4	4.4	1.8	3.1	53.8
Source: Servicio Meteorológico Nacional

== Demographics ==
Río Grande is one of the 58 localities in its namesake municipality, and it is one of the two that is classified as urban. It recorded a population of 35,050 in the 2020 census, up from 32,944 inhabitants in the 2010 Census.

== Economy ==
The main economic activity in Río Grande is agriculture.

Río Grande produces 51,337 tons of beans per year, which makes it the largest producer of this legume in the country, according to the Zacatecas INEGI Statistical Yearbook, surpassing Santiago Ixcuintla, Nayarit, which ranks 2nd, producing 40,530 annual tons according to the Nayarit INEGI Statistical Yearbook. In the "Granero de la Nación" the area planted with beans, in 2008 was 70,450 hectares. According to 2005 data, the total area planted in crops was of 84,624 hectares.
