= XHIH-FM =

Radio station in Fresnillo, Zacatecas

- Fresnillo, Zacatecas; Mexico
- Frequency: 103.3 FM
- Branding: La Única

Ownership
- Owner: Torres Corporativo; (Sucesión de Juana Gallegos Rojas)
- Sister stations: XHEL-FM

History
- First air date: July 20, 1970 (concession)
- Former call signs: XEIH-AM
- Former frequencies: 1400 kHz, 770 kHz

Technical information
- Licensing authority: CRT
- Class: C1
- ERP: 32.27 kW
- HAAT: 258.13 m (846.9 ft)
- Transmitter coordinates: 23°12′47.01″N 102°53′20.47″W

Links
- Webcast: launica.fm

XHIH-FM is a radio station on 103.3 FM in Fresnillo, Zacatecas, known as La Única.

== History ==
XEIH-AM 1400 received its concession on July 20, 1970. The 500-watt station moved to 770 kHz with 10 kW day and 1 kW night in the 1990s. XEIH was owned by Juana Gallegos Rojas until her death.

XEIH was cleared to move to FM in December 2011, with its tower on Cerro Xoconostle. Several years later, XHIH-FM was approved to increase power to 32.27 kW.
