= Juan Aldama, Zacatecas =

City in the Mexican state of Zacatecas

Juan Aldama
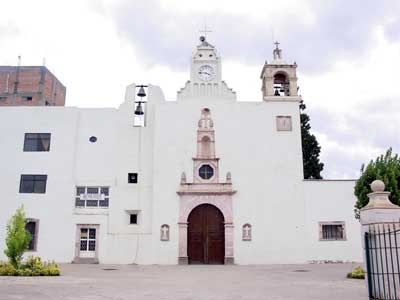
- St. John the Baptist Parish

- Location in Mexico
- Coordinates: 24°17′28″N 103°23′38″W
- Country: Mexico
- State: Zacatecas
- Municipality: Juan Aldama
- Settled: 1591
- Elevation: 2,023 m (6,637 ft)

Population (2020)
  - Total: 15,045
- Time zone: UTC-6 (Central Time Zone)

Juan Aldama is a city in the northwestern portion of the Mexican state of Zacatecas. It is the biggest community in the Municipality of Juan Aldama and the seat of the municipal government.

== History ==
The region was originally inhabited by Indigenous Zacatecos.

The area was settled in 1591 by some of the Tlaxcaltecan families led by mestizo military Captain Miguel Caldera.

The town was renamed for Independence revolutionary Juan Aldama. It had previously been known as San Juan Bautista del Mezquital and Villa Aréchiga.

== Demographics ==
- Population: about 20,000.
- Death rate: 150 people yearly.
- Newborn rate: 500 babies yearly.

== Geography ==
Juan Aldama is located in the northwestern portion of the Mexican state of Zacatecas. Juan Aldama is surrounded by small towns such as Ojitos, Jalpa, Cienega more known as general Juan Jose Rios, Las Norias, Corrales and Paradillas and many more

=== Climate ===
Climate data for Juan Aldama (1951–2010)
Month	Jan	Feb	Mar	Apr	May	Jun	Jul	Aug	Sep	Oct	Nov	Dec	Year
Record high °C (°F)	30.0 (86.0)	30.5 (86.9)	36.0 (96.8)	37.0 (98.6)	39.0 (102.2)	39.5 (103.1)	39.0 (102.2)	35.0 (95.0)	35.0 (95.0)	37.0 (98.6)	31.0 (87.8)	31.0 (87.8)	39.5 (103.1)
Mean daily maximum °C (°F)	20.6 (69.1)	22.5 (72.5)	26.0 (78.8)	29.2 (84.6)	31.6 (88.9)	31.6 (88.9)	28.9 (84.0)	28.1 (82.6)	26.5 (79.7)	25.6 (78.1)	23.6 (74.5)	21.1 (70.0)	26.3 (79.3)
Daily mean °C (°F)	12.3 (54.1)	13.6 (56.5)	16.5 (61.7)	19.6 (67.3)	22.3 (72.1)	23.3 (73.9)	21.8 (71.2)	21.3 (70.3)	19.8 (67.6)	17.8 (64.0)	15.2 (59.4)	13.0 (55.4)	18.0 (64.4)
Mean daily minimum °C (°F)	4.0 (39.2)	4.7 (40.5)	7.1 (44.8)	10.0 (50.0)	13.0 (55.4)	15.1 (59.2)	14.7 (58.5)	14.4 (57.9)	13.1 (55.6)	10.0 (50.0)	6.8 (44.2)	4.9 (40.8)	9.8 (49.6)
Record low °C (°F)	−7.5 (18.5)	−10.0 (14.0)	−4.5 (23.9)	−2.0 (28.4)	5.0 (41.0)	9.5 (49.1)	6.0 (42.8)	2.5 (36.5)	4.0 (39.2)	−3.5 (25.7)	−5.0 (23.0)	−14.0 (6.8)	−14.0 (6.8)
Average precipitation mm (inches)	7.2 (0.28)	7.1 (0.28)	2.7 (0.11)	3.8 (0.15)	12.3 (0.48)	58.3 (2.30)	91.9 (3.62)	110.9 (4.37)	88.6 (3.49)	27.6 (1.09)	10.9 (0.43)	9.8 (0.39)	431.1 (16.97)
Average precipitation days (≥ 0.1 mm)	1.3	1.2	0.5	0.9	1.8	6.1	9.0	10.6	8.2	3.5	1.3	1.3	45.7
Source: Servicio Meteorologico Nacional

== Economy ==
- Technology/Communication/Media: Internet, Telephone, and Fax.
- Juan Aldama's main source of economy is based on trade and cultivation of corn and beans.
