= 89.1 FM =

FM radio frequency

The following radio stations broadcast on FM frequency 89.1 MHz:

== Argentina ==
- Antena Libre in General Roca, Río Negro
- Universidad in San Justo, Buenos Aires
- Universo in San Nicolás de los Arroyos, Buenos Aires
- Uno in Concordia, Entre Ríos
- Del Sol in Viedma, Río Negro
- Estación Vinilo in Mar del Plata, Buenos Aires
- Radio María (Argentina) in Rosario, Santa Fe
- Imágenes in San Salvador, Entre Rios
- Orion in Salliqueló, Buenos Aires
- Radio María in Dolores, Buenos Aires
- Radio María in San Pedro de Jujuy, Jujuy
- Radio María in Rosario, Santa Fe
- Records in Comodoro Rivadavia, Chubut
- Sol in Rosario, Santa Fe
- STOP in Paraná, Entre Ríos
- Tiempo in Villa Mercedes, San Luis
- Bariloche in San Carlos de Bariloche, Río Negro
- Zoe in Chaco

== Australia ==
- 89.1 Radio Blue Mountains in Katoomba, New South Wales
- 4KRY in Kingaroy, Queensland
- 5BBB in Adelaide, South Australia

== Brunei ==
- Radio Al-Quran

== Bermuda ==
- ZBM-FM

== Brasil ==
- 89 a Radio Rock in Osasco, São Paulo

== Canada (Channel 206) ==
- CBFY-FM in Ville-Marie, Quebec
- CBHC-FM in Truro, Nova Scotia
- CBK-FM-1 in Prince Albert, Saskatchewan
- CBLA-FM-2 in Paris, Ontario
- CBLG-FM in Geraldton, Ontario
- CBNF-FM in Bonne Bay, Newfoundland and Labrador
- CBSI-FM-3 in Churchill Falls, Newfoundland and Labrador
- CFNQ-FM in Natashquan, Quebec
- CFOU-FM in Trois-Rivieres, Quebec
- CHSD-FM in Squamish, British Columbia
- CHUO-FM in Ottawa, Ontario
- CISO-FM in Orillia, Ontario
- CJBR-FM in Rimouski, Quebec
- CKRL-FM in Quebec City, Quebec
- CKYY-FM in Welland, Ontario
- CKSB-9-FM in Fort Frances, Ontario
- VF8006 in Piopolis, Quebec

== China ==
- Beijing Story Radio in Beijing
- CNR The Voice of China in Nanchang
- CRI Voice of the South China Sea in Sanya

== Israel ==
- Pervoye Radio in the Shephelah

== Japan ==
- AFN Okinawa Wave 89

== Mexico ==
- XHAVR-FM in Alvarado, Veracruz
- XHCAH-FM in Cacahoatán, Chiapas
- XHCAO-FM in Ciudad Camargo, Tamaulipas
- XHCARH-FM in Cardonal, Hidalgo
- XHCEA-FM in Los Reyes de Salgado, Michoacán
- XHCPBG-FM in Santa María Ocotán, Durango
- XHCSAO-FM in San Felipe, Baja California
- XHEFG-FM in Celaya (El Puesto), Guanajuato
- XHEHF-FM in Nogales, Sonora
- XHENR-FM in Nueva Rosita, Coahuila
- XHEPF-FM in Ensenada, Baja California
- XHETB-FM in Gómez Palacio, Durango
- XHGDA-FM in Guadalajara, Jalisco
- XHIKE-FM in Salina Cruz, Oaxaca
- XHITG-FM in Tuxtla Gutiérrez, Chiapas
- XHLUP-FM in Compostela, Nayarit
- XHNTA-FM in Santa Ana, Sonora
- XHPEFK-FM in Hidalgo Del Parral, Chihuahua
- XHPMQ-FM in Puerto Morelos, Quintana Roo
- XHPSJC-FM in San José del Cabo, Baja California Sur
- XHRHV-FM in Chalma, Veracruz
- XHXM-FM in Jerez, Zacatecas
- XHZTM-FM in Zitácuaro, Michoacán

== Philippines (Channel 206) ==
- DZMZ - defunct, Metro Manila
- DWAV in Metro Manila
- JJS Internet Radio in Moalboal, Cebu
- DYDW (Cebu) in Cebu City
- DXBE in Davao City
- DWMV in Legazpi City

== South Korea ==
- HLKC-FM in Seoul

== United Kingdom ==
=== England ===
- BBC Radio 2 at Wrotham, Kent
- BRMB in Birmingham

== United States (Channel 206) ==
- KADV in Garberville, California
- KAGP in Greenwood, Texas
- KANO in Hilo, Hawaii
- KANW in Albuquerque, New Mexico
- KAUR in Sioux Falls, South Dakota
- KAVY in McCall, Idaho
- KAWS (FM) in Marsing, Idaho
- KBBF in Santa Rosa, California
- KBHU in Spearfish, South Dakota
- KBTD in Freer, Texas
- KBWA in Brush, Colorado
- KBYU in Provo, Utah
- KCEA in Atherton, California
- KCFH in Two Harbors, California
- KCJH in Livingston, California
- KCLC in Saint Charles, Missouri
- KCRU in Oxnard, California
- KDAI (FM) in Scottsbluff, Nebraska
- KECC in La Junta, Colorado
- KEOS in College Station, Texas
- KFAE in Richland, Washington
- KGCY in Cheyenne Wells, Colorado
- KGFN in Goldfield, Nevada
- KGHE in Montesano, Washington
- KGLZ in East Helena, Montana
- KGOH in Colby, Kansas
- KHAP in Chico, California
- KHJM in Dexter, Missouri
- KHNE in Hastings, Nebraska
- KHOI in Story City, Iowa
- KHOL in Jackson, Wyoming
- KHUI in Alamosa, Colorado
- KJKL in Jamestown, North Dakota
- KJZX-LP in Austin, Texas
- KKLB in Bartlesville, Oklahoma
- KLBF in Lincoln, North Dakota
- KLFR in Reedsport, Oregon
- KLPI in Ruston, Louisiana
- KLVK (FM) in Fountain Hills, Arizona
- KLWC in Casper, Wyoming
- KMHD in Gresham, Oregon
- KMJB in Hudson, Wyoming
- KMUW in Wichita, Kansas
- KNNZ in Hawley, Minnesota
- KNSJ in Descanso, California
- KNSZ in Ottumwa, Iowa
- KNWT in Cody, Wyoming
- KODV in Barstow, California
- KPGT in Watertown, South Dakota
- KPRX in Bakersfield, California
- KPVL in Postville, Iowa
- KQAI in Roswell, New Mexico
- KQDL in Hines, Oregon
- KQFZ-FM in Valley View, Texas
- KQOU in Clinton, Oklahoma
- KQXS in Stephenville, Texas
- KRFF in Fairbanks, Alaska
- KRLR in Sulphur, Louisiana
- KSJM (FM) in St. James, Minnesota
- KSMF in Ashland, Oregon
- KSPP in Rhinelander, Wisconsin
- KSQX in Springtown, Texas
- KSRP in Dodge City, Kansas
- KSTX in San Antonio, Texas
- KTIM in Ellinger, Texas
- KTLC in Canon City, Colorado
- KTTZ-FM in Lubbock, Texas
- KUAR in Little Rock, Arkansas
- KUAZ in Tucson, Arizona
- KUFM (FM) in Missoula, Montana
- KUOR (FM) in Redlands, California
- KURU in Silver City, New Mexico
- KUYI-LP in Upper Moencopi, Arizona
- KVCS in Spring Valley, Minnesota
- KVDP (FM) in Dry Prong, Louisiana
- KVFL in Pierre, South Dakota
- KVMT in Montrose, Colorado
- KVNV in Sun Valley, Nevada
- KVSE in Blanchard, Louisiana
- KWFC in Springfield, Missouri
- KXGM in Hiawatha, Iowa
- KXLV in Amarillo, Texas
- KXPB-LP in Pacific Beach, Washington
- KXTH in Seminole, Oklahoma
- KYFP in Palestine, Texas
- WAKP in Smithboro, Georgia
- WAUZ in Greensburg, Indiana
- WBCX in Gainesville, Georgia
- WBIB-FM in Forsyth, Georgia
- WBOI in Fort Wayne, Indiana
- WBSD in Burlington, Wisconsin
- WBSN in New Orleans, Louisiana
- WBSU in Brockport, New York
- WBUH in Brewster, Massachusetts
- WBYH in Hawley, Pennsylvania
- WCJL in Margaret, Alabama
- WCNV in Heathsville, Virginia
- WCOV-FM in Friendship, New York
- WDNX in Olive Hill, Tennessee
- WDWN in Auburn, New York
- WECV in Nashville, Tennessee
- WEMU in Ypsilanti, Michigan
- WEVO in Concord, New Hampshire
- WFDU in Teaneck, New Jersey
- WFNM in Lancaster, Pennsylvania
- WFSW in Panama City, Florida
- WGLT in Normal, Illinois
- WGMS (FM) in Hagerstown, Maryland
- WGZS in Cloquet, Minnesota
- WHAA in Adams, Wisconsin
- WHAB in Acton, Massachusetts
- WHYU-FM in Meyersdale, Pennsylvania
- WIDR in Kalamazoo, Michigan
- WIMB in Murphysboro, Illinois
- WJJE in Delaware, Ohio
- WJPZ in Syracuse, New York
- WKCX in Crittenden, Kentucky
- WKEK in Gunflint Lake, Minnesota
- WKNG in Heflin, Alabama
- WKSV in Thompson, Ohio
- WKYG in Murray, Kentucky
- WLAZ in Kissimmee, Florida
- WLBF in Montgomery, Alabama
- WLJK in Aiken, South Carolina
- WLKB in Bay City, Michigan
- WLPR in Lowell, Indiana
- WMBU in Forest, Mississippi
- WMHT in Schenectady, New York
- WNIA (FM) in Tarboro, North Carolina
- WNIE in Freeport, Illinois
- WNYU in New York, New York
- WNZN in Lorain, Ohio
- WOCG in Livingston, Tennessee
- WOFM (FM) in Alcoa, Tennessee
- WOKL in Round Lake Beach, Illinois
- WONC in Naperville, Illinois
- WOUC in Cambridge, Ohio
- WOUL in Ironton, Ohio
- WPAS in Pascagoula, Mississippi
- WPHS in Warren, Michigan
- WPKT in Norwich, Connecticut
- WRLP in Orange, Virginia
- WRPB in Benedicta, Maine
- WRSM in Rising Sun, Maryland
- WRXV in State College, Pennsylvania
- WRYN in Hickory, North Carolina
- WSFX (FM) in Nanticoke, Pennsylvania
- WSMR (FM) in Sarasota, Florida
- WSPM in Cloverdale, Indiana
- WSSW in Platteville, Wisconsin
- WUFT in Gainesville, Florida
- WUSO in Springfield, Ohio
- WVJC in Mount Carmel, Illinois
- WVTF in Roanoke, Virginia
- WWCJ in Cape May, New Jersey
- WWFM in Trenton, New Jersey
- WWIP in Cheriton, Virginia
- WXHL in Christiana, Delaware
- WXVU in Villanova, Pennsylvania
- WYBF in Radnor Township, Pennsylvania
- WYLV in Alcoa, Tennessee
- WYNS in Waynesville, Ohio
- WYTC-LP in Hyde Park, Vermont
- WZMV in Mohrsville, Pennsylvania
