= WOFM =

WOFM may refer to:

- WOFM (FM), a radio station (89.1 FM) licensed to Alcoa, Tennessee, United States
- WOZZ, a radio station (94.7 FM) licensed to Mosinee, Wisconsin, which used the call letters WOFM from 1991 to 2010.
