= KSRP =

KSRP may refer to:

- KSRP (FM), a radio station in Dodge City, Kansas, United States
- KHSRP, a gene also known as KSRP
