= XHCEA-FM =

Radio station in Los Reyes de Salgado, Michoacán

Los Reyes de Salgado, Michoacán; Mexico
- Frequency: 89.1 FM
- Branding: Radio Paraíso

Programming
- Format: Community

Ownership
- Owner: Colectivo Expresión Alternativa, A.C.

History
- First air date: May 18, 2015 (concession)
- Call sign meaning: Colectivo Expresión Alternativa

Technical information
- ERP: .05 kW

Links
- Website: facebook.com/radioparaiso89.1fm

XHCEA-FM is a community radio station in Los Reyes de Salgado, Michoacán, broadcasting on 89.1 FM. It is owned by Colectivo Expresión Alternativa, A.C. and is known as Radio Paraíso.

XHCEA broadcasts from 3 to 9 pm on weekdays.
