= XHENR-FM =

Radio station in Nueva Rosita, Coahuila, Mexico

- Nueva Rosita, Coahuila; Mexico
- Frequency: 89.1 FM
- Branding: NR

Programming
- Format: Regional Mexican

Ownership
- Owner: Daniel Boone Menchaca

History
- First air date: November 12, 1953 (concession)
- Former call signs: XENR-AM
- Call sign meaning: Nueva Rosita

Technical information
- Licensing authority: CRT
- Class: B1
- ERP: 25 kW
- HAAT: 53.65 m (176.0 ft)
- Transmitter coordinates: 27°56′41″N 101°14′04″W

Links
- Webcast: Listen live
- Website: xenrnuevarosita.com.mx

XHENR-FM is a radio station on 89.1 FM in Nueva Rosita, Coahuila. It is known as NR and carries a Regional Mexican format.

== History ==
XENR-AM 980 received its concession on November 12, 1953. It was authorized to operate at 5,000 watts daytime by the 1960s and has been owned by Daniel Boone Menchaca since the start.

It was approved to migrate to FM in 2011.
