= XHXM-FM =

Radio station in Jerez de García Salinas, Zacatecas

- Jerez, Zacatecas; Mexico
- Frequency: 89.1 FM
- Branding: Radio Jerez

Programming
- Format: Regional Mexican

Ownership
- Owner: Grupo Radiofónico Zer; (Arnoldo Rodríguez Zermeño)

History
- First air date: March 8, 1978 (concession); 2012 (FM)

Technical information
- Licensing authority: CRT
- Class: B1
- ERP: 25 kW
- HAAT: −40 m (−130 ft)
- Transmitter coordinates: 22°38′36″N 102°57′41″W

Links
- Website: Grupo Radiofónico ZER Website

XHXM-FM is a radio station on 89.1 FM in Jerez, Zacatecas. The station is owned by Grupo Radiofónico Zer and is known as Radio Jerez, which offers a Regional Mexican format.

== History ==
XHXM began as XEXM-AM 1360 in 1978. It was owned by Jesús Ávila Femat. The station would later move to 1150.

In 2012, XEXM was applied to be moved to the lowest available frequency, which was 870. It also began its migration to FM as XHXM-FM 89.1.

In 2013, the concession for XEXM-XHXM was transferred to Arnoldo Rodríguez Zermeño.
