= Pescador Island =

Island in Cebu, Philippines

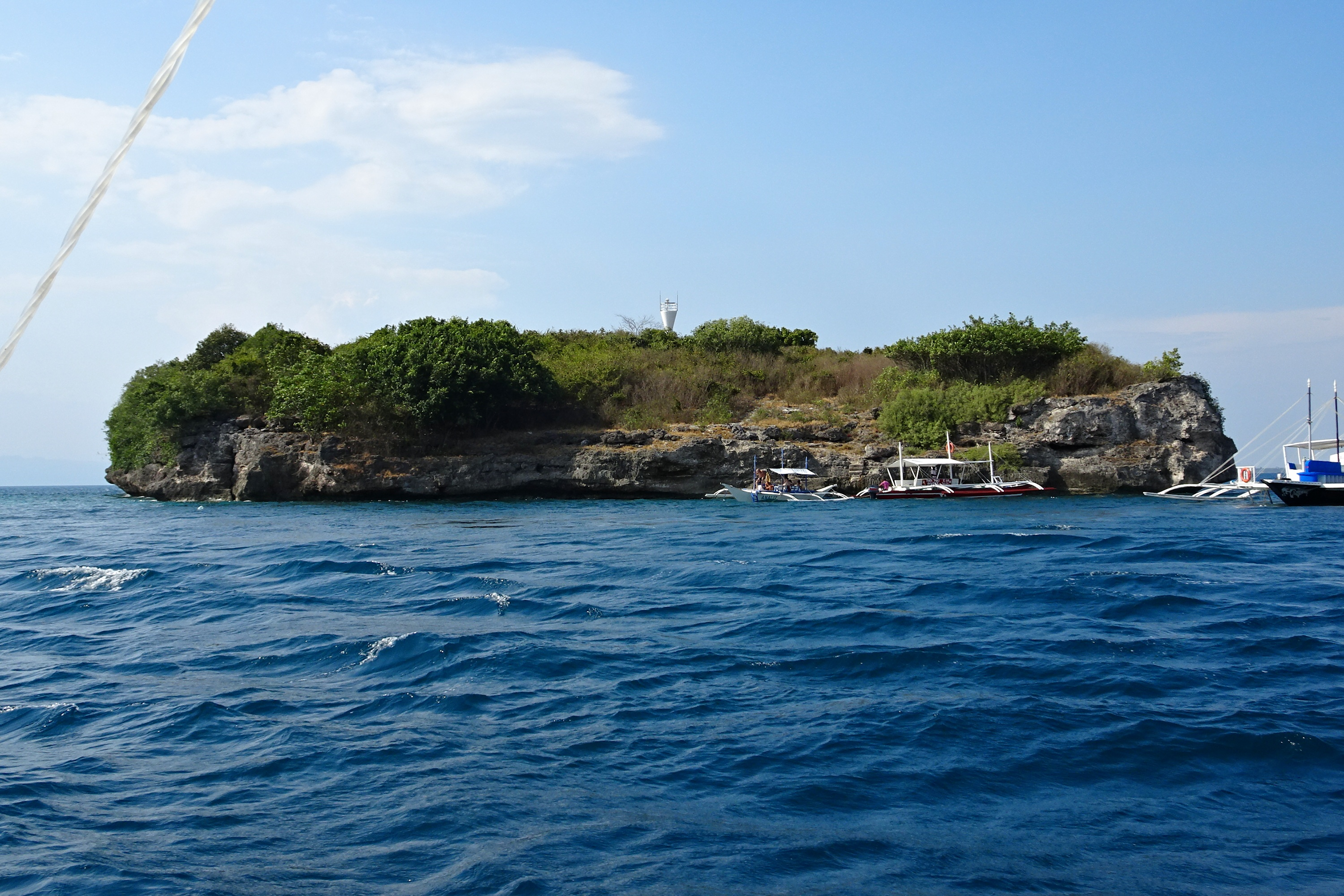

- Location within Visayas Location within Philippines

Geography
- Coordinates: 9.923°N 123.3435°E
- Adjacent to: Tañon Strait
- Area: 3.8 km^{2} (1.5 sq mi)

Administration
- Philippines
- Region: Central Visayas
- Province: Cebu
- Municipality: Moalboal
- Barangay: Basdiot

Pescador Island (locally known as Agad-Agad) is a small limestone island located in the Tañon Strait, a few kilometres from the western coast of the island of Cebu in the Philippines. It is under the jurisdiction of the municipality of Moalboal.

The island derives its name from the Philippines' Spanish colonial heritage and the abundance of fish living on the surrounding coral reef, and the many fishermen that fish them ("pescador" translates from Spanish to "fisherman"). The rich marine life also attracts recreational divers from the many dive operations in nearby Panagsama.

The underwater composition of the Pescador island reef is a sandy slope covered with soft coral from 5–10 metres (15–35 ft), followed by a wall covered with hard corals dropping down to about 40 metres (130 ft). On the west side of the island, an open-top underwater cave nicknamed 'the Cathedral' can be found. Most recreational dive tours start at the island's south end, and let the divers drift with the current either along the east or the west side of the island. Visibility conditions vary, but the current in the Tañon Strait pushes in clear water that often allows visibility up to 40 metres (130 ft). The island itself has a lighthouse and access steps on the north and east sides.

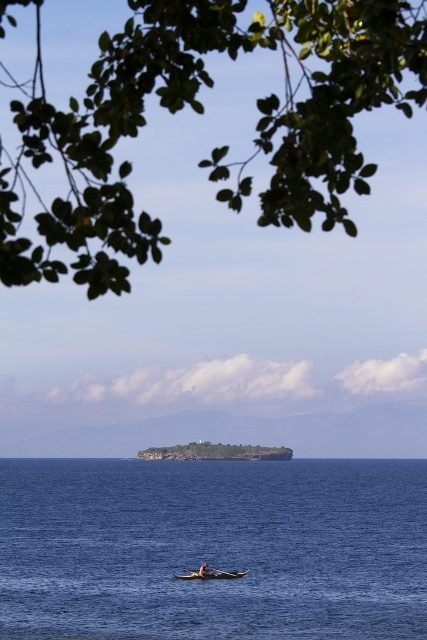
View of the island, taken from Panagsama Beach

The warm waters of the Philippines harbour a rich variety of marine life, with over 2,500 species of fish. Many of these are found around Pescador island, contributing to its popularity with divers. A more unusual part of the island's biodiversity is the large school of sardines that have made the relative sanctuary of the reef their home. After an earthquake in February 2012, the school left the island, affecting the population of larger predatory fish. However, in May 2013 the school returned and so did the bigger fish. Sightings of sharks have also been reported.

In 1990, the Sangguniang Bayan of Moalboal declared Pescador Island a marine park and fish sanctuary. Since it is a marine park, dive shops are required to pay a fee for each diver they bring to the island. Proceeds from the fees, which are managed by the Municipality of Moalboal and the Moalboal Dive Center Association, contribute to local conservation programs. These programs include patrols and enforcement to abolish destructive fishing, village improvement programs, collection and disposal of plastic and other waste entering the local waters, marine conservation education for village children and adults, and reef and mangrove rehabilitation.

== Sources ==
- Carpenter, Kent E.; Springer, Victor G. (2005). "The center of the center of marine shore fish biodiversity: the Philippine Islands". Environmental Biology of Fishes. 72 (4): 467–480. doi:10.1007/s10641-004-3154-4. S2CID 8280012.
