= XHIKE-FM =

Community radio station in Salina Cruz, Oaxaca

Salina Cruz, Oaxaca; Mexico
- Frequency: 89.1 FM
- Branding: Radio Activa

Programming
- Format: Community radio

Ownership
- Owner: Ike Siidi Viaa, A.C.

History
- First air date: March 16, 2017
- Call sign meaning: IKE Siidi Viaa

Technical information
- Class: AA
- ERP: 6 kW
- HAAT: 53.6 m
- Transmitter coordinates: 16°10′37″N 95°11′15.47″W

Links
- Webcast: sp3.servidorrprivado.com/6617/;
- Website: radioxhikefm.com/paginaWP/

XHIKE-FM is a community radio station on 89.1 FM in Salina Cruz, Oaxaca. It is known as Radio Activa and owned by the civil association Ike Siidi Viaa, A.C.

== History ==
XHIKE is the oldest of the three licensed community radio stations in the Istmo Region. The award of its concession was approved on December 14, 2016. When the award was made public in early 2017, the name of the station was announced at the time as Radio IKE, later changing to Radio Activa. The station launched on March 16, 2017.
