= XHZTM-FM =

Radio station in Zitácuaro, Michoacán, Mexico

Zitácuaro, Michoacán; Mexico
- Frequency: 89.1 FM
- Branding: Fantasía W Radio

Programming
- Format: News/talk
- Affiliations: Radiópolis

Ownership
- Owner: Alfonso Ibarra Valdés

History
- First air date: February 15, 2016 (concession)
- Call sign meaning: ZiTácuaro Michoacán

Technical information
- ERP: 3 kW
- Transmitter coordinates: 19°26′13″N 100°21′16″W

Links
- Webcast: Listen live
- Website: fantasiaradiomx.com

XHZTM-FM is a non-commercial radio station on 89.1 FM in Zitácuaro, Michoacán, Mexico, owned by Alfonso Ibarra Valdés. It is known as Fantasía W Radio.

== History ==
XHZTM received its social use concession on February 15, 2016. It serves as a broadcast outlet for Fantasía Radio, which began operations as an internet radio station in 2010.
