= XHPMQ-FM =

Radio station in Puerto Morelos, Quintana Roo

- Puerto Morelos, Quintana Roo; Mexico
- Broadcast area: Puerto Morelos, Quintana Roo
- Frequency: 89.1 FM
- Branding: 89.1 Frecuencia Mágica

Ownership
- Owner: Fundación Cultural Maya Puerto Morelos, A.C.
- Operator: Grupo Canton

History
- First air date: December 2012 (permit)
- Call sign meaning: Puerto Morelos Quintana Roo

Technical information
- Licensing authority: CRT
- Class: A
- ERP: 3 kW
- HAAT: 80.4 m (264 ft)

XHPMQ-FM is a noncommercial radio station on 89.1 FM in Puerto Morelos, Quintana Roo, Mexico. It is known as 89.1 Frecuencia Mágica.

== History ==
XHPMQ was permitted in December 2012.
