= Cayuga Community College =

Public college in Cayuga County, New York, US

- Former names: Cayuga County Community College; Auburn Community College
- Type: Public community college
- Established: 1953; 73 years ago
- Parent institution: State University of New York
- President: Brian M. Durant
- Undergraduates: 3,711 (fall 2025)
- Location: Auburn, New York, United States; 42.945079°N 76.542783°W
- Campus: Suburban 50 acres (0.20 km^{2})
- Colors: White & red
- Nickname: Spartans
- Sporting affiliations: National Junior College Athletic Association, Region III
- Mascot: The Spartan
- Website: www.cayuga-cc.edu

Cayuga Community College, formerly Cayuga County Community College, is a public community college in Cayuga County, New York, United States. It is part of the SUNY system and began in 1953 as Auburn Community College. Its main campus is in Auburn, New York. The college also serves Oswego County with its branch campus in Fulton.

The college offers associate degrees and now hosts the University Center, which offers B.A. and B.S. degrees from a number of colleges, on the grounds of CCC. There are 3,775 full-time and part-time students. Degree programs include liberal arts for transfer preparation, computer science, criminal justice, broadcasting, art, nursing, geographic information systems, and education.

== History ==
The State University of New York (SUNY) Board of Trustees approved the establishment of its first community college on April 9, 1953. Classes began the following year in September at Auburn Community College in the former James Street Elementary School with sixty-nine students. In 1977, Cayuga County assumed sponsorship for the college and it changed its name to Cayuga County Community College. Albert T. Skinner, dean from 1953 to 1955 and president from 1955 until 1978 was instrumental in starting and developing the school from its humble beginnings to the campus where it is now located. Four of its buildings were added during his tenure.

Six year after opening, the college moved to its current location to accommodate rising enrollment. The original classroom building remains the main building on campus, with other buildings added at later dates: the library (1964), the technology building (1970), the bookstore (1971), Spartan Hall (1980), and the nature center (1983). Later expansions included the opening of the Fulton Campus in 1994. In 2003, the college also opened the Regional Economic Center, which housed classrooms; the offices of several agencies providing employment services to area residents; the new home of the college's NASA-sponsored Institute for the Application of Geospatial Technology; and the college's Business and Industry Center, a workforce training complex.

Daniel Paul Larson joined Cayuga as its seventh president in 2007. Six years into his term, in 2013, the college experienced public turmoil when three of the four unions at the college voted no confidence in his leadership. In October of that year, he tendered his resignation, which was accepted by the board effective November 4. Shortly thereafter, the college also declared financial exigency.

Gregory T. DeCinque joined Cayuga Community College as interim president in December 2013. Brian M. Durant succeeded him in August 2015.

== Campus ==
=== Auburn ===
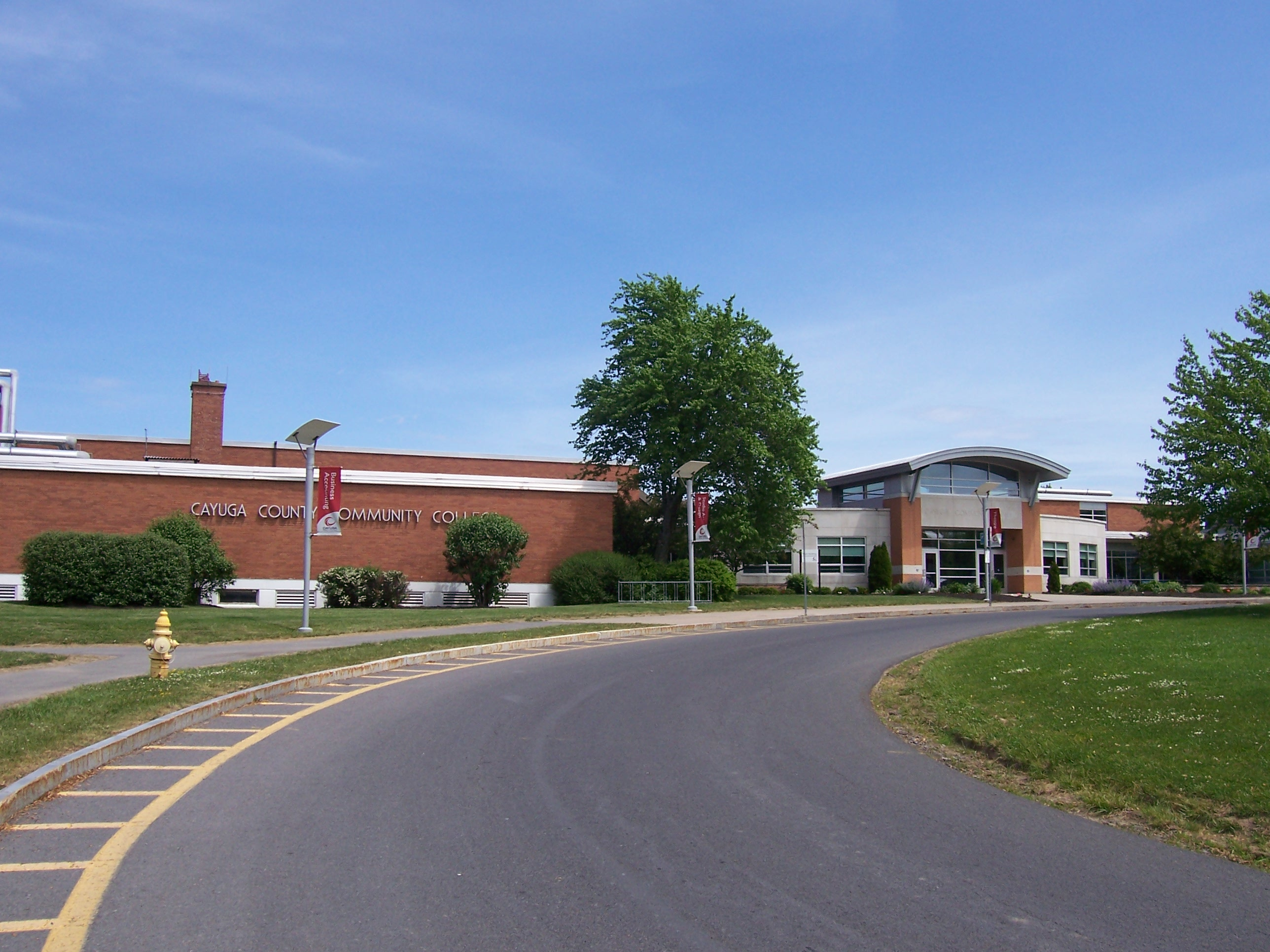
Main entrance

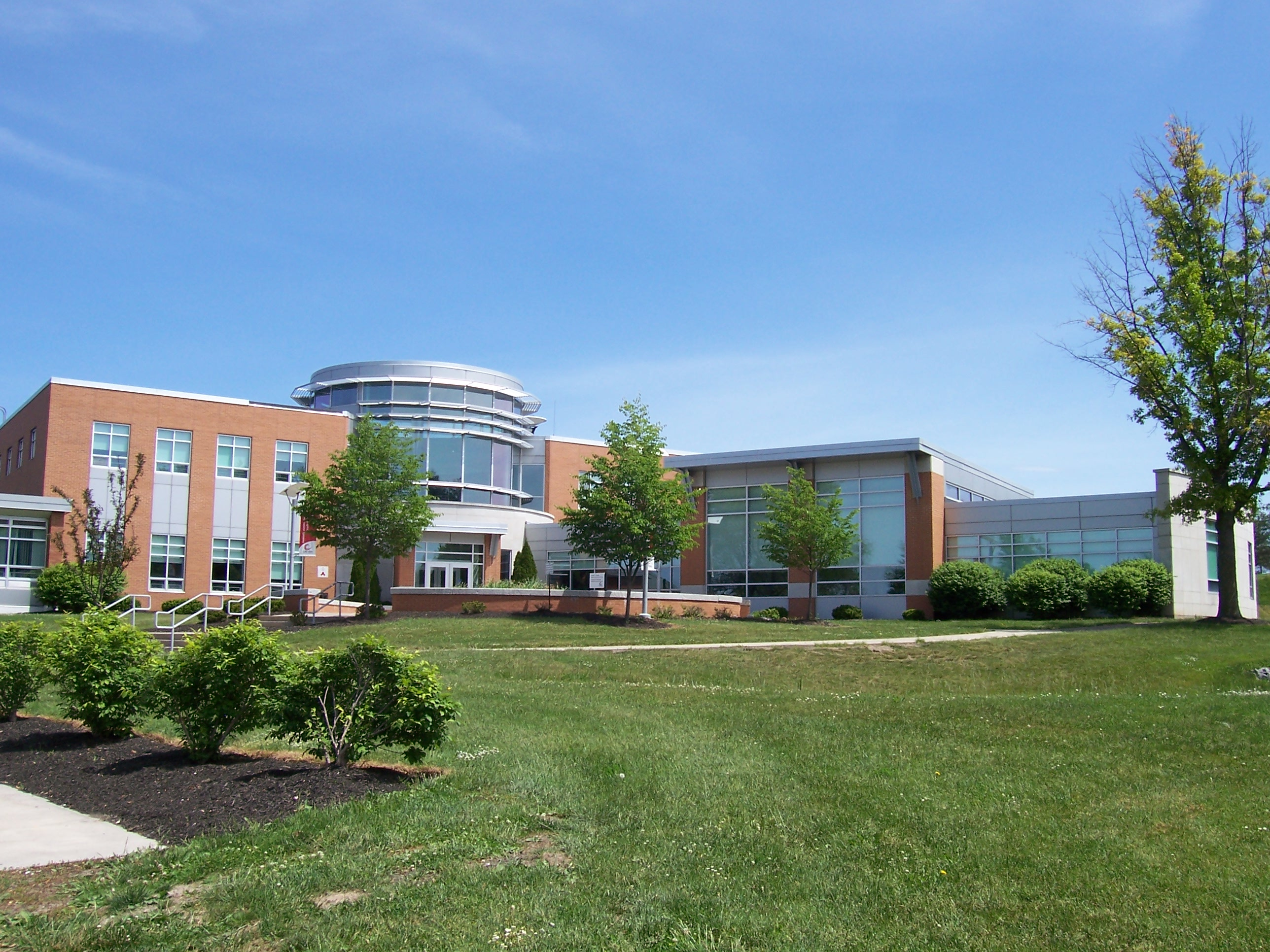
The Karpinski Rotunda and the James T. Walsh Regional Economic Center

Cayuga Community College is in the Cayuga-Oswego County region. Cayuga consists of a main campus in Auburn, and a second in Fulton. The Auburn Campus consists of five main sections referred to as "buildings": Spartan Hall, the Main Building, the Regional Economic Center, the Library Building, and the Tech Building.

Cayuga Community College degree programs include health sciences such as Occupational Therapy Assistant programs, media production, art, accounting, education, criminal justice, geographic information systems, and liberal arts.

=== Fulton ===
Located in Fulton, New York in Oswego County, Cayuga opened an extension site in the city of Fulton in January 1994. The "campus" briefly consisted of two rented classrooms in the basement of the Fulton Education Center, until later in the year when classes and offices moved into the former Holy Family School building on West Third Street.

In the summer of 2001, the facility on Route 3 opened as Cayuga's Fulton Extension Center. It was expanded in 2004 with additional classroom and office space to meet a dramatic rise in enrollment. In 2006, New York State granted the facility branch campus status, and the "Fulton campus" designation became official.

On July 20, 2011, it was reported in the Syracuse Post Standard that architectural plans were moving forward for a new Fulton campus. The college's board of trustees had looked over floor plans of the new Fulton campus to be built in the River Glen shopping center. Architect Karin Kilgore-Green said that 51,000 square feet (4,700 m^{2}) of space in the former P&C store in Fulton would be converted. A second floor with 30,000 square feet (2,800 m^{2}) of space would be built over the P&C site. The college bought the former P&C Foods building at River Glen Plaza for $950,000, and also paid $495,000 for 45 acres (180,000 m^{2}) of adjoining land. College officials said the purchases were made because CCC needed more space and wanted to own its site.

The current facility on Route 481 opened in the summer of 2012 as Cayuga's Fulton campus. At the heart of the campus is the Learning Commons, housing an open computing lab with dozens of computer workstations, a Center for Academic Success, and the Disabilities Services offices. Also located within the Learning Commons is the library, providing continually expanding collections of print and nonprint resources for Fulton faculty and staff, instruction service, laptop computers, online access to all electronic resources, and daily delivery of items from the Auburn collections.

The Fulton campus also features 21 general classrooms, distance-learning and video conferencing facilities, five dedicated computer labs, two rooms that could be computer and classrooms, two art rooms, two science labs for biology and chemistry, two conference rooms with the capability for distance learning, library, health suite, offices and student support area with financial aid, bursar and admissions. The Fulton campus also houses business and industry training facilities, a full-service bookstore, and a student lounge.

== Governance ==
The college is governed by a ten-member board of trustees. The governor appoints four trustees for seven-year terms, five are appointed by the Cayuga County Legislature for seven-year terms, and a student trustee is elected annually and serves for one year. Dr. Gregory T. DeCinque became Cayuga's interim president in 2013.

== Media ==
The Cayuga Collegian is the school's official student newspaper. It was first published on October 31, 1953 at Auburn Community College as the Auburn Collegian. The name was changed to the Cayuga Collegian when Cayuga County began to sponsor the college, which was then renamed Cayuga County Community College in 1975.

The creative writing and art clubs publish the creative arts journal Listen. The Auburn/Cayuga Community College Alumni Association publishes the ACC/CCC alumni newsletter every semester.

WDWN (89.1 FM) is the school's radio station.
