= XHRHV-FM =

Radio station in Chalma, Veracruz, Mexico

- Chalma, Veracruz; Mexico
- Frequency: 89.1 MHz
- Branding: Macro Radio

Ownership
- Owner: La Chalmerita, A.C.

History
- First air date: December 17, 2015 (social concession)

Technical information
- ERP: 0.5 kW
- Transmitter coordinates: 21°12′49.39″N 98°23′48.27″W

XHRHV-FM is a noncommercial radio station on 89.1 FM in Chalma, Veracruz, Mexico, known as Macro Radio.

== History ==
In 2011, "La Chalmerita", an unauthorized radio station, began operation on 89.1 MHz from the Chalma municipal hall. It was the first FM radio station in an area without broadcast television or cellular service. As the station was unauthorized, it was shut down during an SCT visit in March 2011.

Given that La Chalmerita was the only station in the area and its loss was a major blow for the community, members of the community decided to form a civil association and seek a permit to begin licensed operations. They succeeded in 2015, when the IFT awarded La Chalmerita a social use concession for a radio station on 89.1 MHz in Chalma, with the callsign XHRHV-FM.
