= WXVU =

Coordinates: 40.0329°N 75.3371°W

- Villanova, Pennsylvania; United States
- Broadcast area: Philadelphia metropolitan area
- Frequency: 89.1 MHz

Programming
- Format: Freeform

Ownership
- Owner: Villanova University

History
- First air date: 1991

Technical information
- Facility ID: 70229
- Class: A
- ERP: 100 watts
- HAAT: 85 meters

Links
- Website: wxvu.org

WXVU (89.1 FM), known as Villanova University Radio, is a college radio station which is broadcast in the Philadelphia area via a 100-watt transmitter that covers an 8-mile (13 km) radius around the Villanova University campus. WXVU offers a variety of music, news, sports, public affairs and specialty programming. All full and part-time Villanova students are eligible to sign up for training and become a station member.

The station formerly shared its FM frequency with Cabrini College's station, WYBF, with WXVU broadcasting four days a week over the air and every day of the week online. In 2022, Villanova and Cabrini reached a deal to end the share-time agreement, with WYBF agreeing to surrender its license and move online-only to allow WXVU to operate full-time.

Villanova student radio began in 1947 when returning GIs built a closed circuit AM carrier current transmitter, located since 1955 in Dougherty Hall. The station's original call letters were WWVU and later WKVU 640 AM. Sporadic attempts to "go FM" came to fruition with the birth of WXVU 89.1 FM in 1991. Notable carrier current-era staff members include Jim Croce and Don McLean, both of whom would become music legends. Ed Gallagher DJ'd a 104-hour radiothon to benefit muscular dystrophy research in March 1975 with guest appearances by notable Philadelphians of the day including WFIL AM 560 boss jock Banana Joe Montione, whose 8 foot fiberglass banana was briefly absconded in a prank. In the late 1970s WKVU became known for its sports programming, and was even briefly the exclusive radio home of Villanova basketball, a relationship which, though no longer exclusive, extended into the Big East era (1980 forward).

WXVU/WKVU alumni, including Ryan Fannon and Whitey Rigsby, have long enjoyed success in professional broadcasting.

Former logo
