= KCFH =

- Two Harbors, California; United States
- Broadcast area: Santa Catalina Island
- Frequency: 89.1 MHz

History
- First air date: July 24, 2013

Technical information
- Licensing authority: FCC
- Facility ID: 175014
- Class: A
- ERP: 100 watts
- HAAT: −32.3 meters (−106 ft)
- Transmitter coordinates: 33°26′29.10″N 118°29′55.60″W

Links
- Public license information: Public file; LMS

KCFH is a class A radio station broadcasting to Two Harbors, California. It serves Santa Catalina Island.

== History ==
KCFH began broadcasting on July 24, 2013.
