= WYLV =

Maynardville, Tennessee; United States
- Broadcast area: Knoxville, Tennessee
- Frequency: 88.3 MHz
- Branding: K-Love

Programming
- Format: Contemporary Christian
- Affiliations: K-LOVE

Ownership
- Owner: Educational Media Foundation

History
- First air date: 1997
- Former call signs: WASJ (1997–2001); WOEZ (2001–2008); WDLF (2008–2011)

Technical information
- Licensing authority: FCC
- Facility ID: 81317
- Class: C2
- ERP: 2,850 watts
- HAAT: 454 meters (1,490 ft)
- Transmitter coordinates: 36°0′13″N 83°56′34″W
- Repeater: 93.9 MHz Gatlinburg, Tennessee

Links
- Public license information: Public file; LMS
- Website: http://www.klove.com/

WYLV is a non-commercial, non-profit Contemporary Christian radio station broadcasting on 88.3 MHz in the Knoxville, Tennessee area.

WDLF began broadcasting a Contemporary Christian format as Life 88.3 on June 1, 2008. It had been a beautiful music station as WOEZ "EZ88" prior to the switch.

On January 1, 2011, WYLV became an affiliate of the Air 1 network after being sold to Educational Media Foundation. Later in January, the WYLV call letters were moved to the 88.3 frequency, as an affiliate of the K-LOVE network. At that time, Air 1 moved to WOFM (FM), which had been WYLV.
