= WFNM =

- Lancaster, Pennsylvania; United States
- Frequency: 89.1 MHz

Programming
- Format: Variety

Ownership
- Owner: Franklin And Marshall College

History
- Call sign meaning: W Franklin and Marshall

Technical information
- Licensing authority: FCC
- Facility ID: 22306
- Class: A
- ERP: 100 watts
- HAAT: 46 meters (151 ft)
- Transmitter coordinates: 40°02′43.3″N 76°19′12.8″W

Links
- Public license information: Public file; LMS
- Website: www.891wfnm.org

WFNM (89.1 FM) is a non-commercial college FM radio station licensed to serve Lancaster, Pennsylvania. The station is owned by Franklin & Marshall College and broadcasts a variety format.

The station Advisor is Josh Hankins. Dan T. Lewis advised from January 1998 to 2018, when he retired. Dan has hosted the "Bessie Smith Green Tea Show" Mondays 5-7 AM. The station's shows are hosted by students, faculty & professional staff DJs. The station broadcasts an eclectic mix, with DJs having talk shows, playing music, or a mix of both.

In 2018, WFNM was ranked #19 on The Princeton Review's Top 20 Best College Radio Stations.

== History ==
The Federal Communications Commission granted WFNM's first license on August 1, 1973.
