= CFNQ-FM =

First Nations radio station in Quebec, Canada

Coordinates: 50°07′45″N 61°48′19″W

- Natashquan, Quebec; Canada
- Frequency: 89.9 MHz

Programming
- Format: First Nations community radio

Ownership
- Owner: Corporation de Radio montagnaise de Natashquan

History
- First air date: February 4, 1982

Technical information
- Licensing authority: CRTC
- ERP: 1 watt
- HAAT: 14 metres (46 ft)

Links
- Website: socam.net/reseaux/cfnq-89-9fm

CFNQ-FM is a First Nations community radio station that operates at 89.9 FM in Natashquan, Quebec, Canada.

The station is owned by Corporation de Radio montagnaise de Natashquan.
