= WBIB-FM =

- Forsyth, Georgia; United States
- Frequency: 89.1 MHz
- Branding: WBIB-FM 89.1 FM

Programming
- Format: Christian

Ownership
- Owner: Believers in Broadcasting, Inc.

Technical information
- Licensing authority: FCC
- Facility ID: 168943
- Class: A
- ERP: 100 watts
- HAAT: 53 metres (174 ft)
- Transmitter coordinates: 33°03′1″N 83°57′10″W

Links
- Public license information: Public file; LMS
- Webcast: Listen Live
- Website: Official Website

WBIB-FM (89.1 FM) is a radio station licensed to serve the community of Forsyth, Georgia. The station is owned by Believers in Broadcasting, Inc., and airs a Christian format.

The station was assigned the WBIB-FM call letters by the Federal Communications Commission on March 25, 2008.
