= WWIP =

Radio station in Cheriton, Virginia, United States

- Cheriton, Virginia; United States
- Broadcast area: Cape Charles, Virginia; Norfolk, Virginia; Hampton, Virginia
- Frequency: 89.1 MHz
- Branding: WWIP FM 89.1

Programming
- Format: Contemporary Christian; Religious

Ownership
- Owner: Delmarva Educational Association
- Sister stations: WZLV

History
- First air date: 2007 Last air date April, 2024
- Call sign meaning: "Word in Praise"

Technical information
- Licensing authority: FCC
- Facility ID: 90265
- Class: B
- ERP: 20,000 Watts
- HAAT: 137 meters (449 ft)
- Transmitter coordinates: 37°10′53.0″N 75°57′47.0″W

Links
- Public license information: Public file; LMS
- Webcast: WWIP Webstream
- Website: WWIP Online

WWIP was a Contemporary Christian and Religious formatted broadcast radio station licensed to Cheriton, Virginia, United States, serving the Cape Charles/Norfolk/Hampton area. WWIP was owned and operated by Delmarva Educational Association. The signal was traded to Educational Media Foundation and WWIP went off the air in April of 2024. The station now operates as WHAR Air One.
