= WDWN =

Alternative rock radio station at Cayuga County Community College

- Auburn, New York; United States
- Broadcast area: Finger Lakes
- Frequency: 89.1 MHz (HD Radio)
- Branding: Win 89fm

Programming
- Format: Alternative

Ownership
- Owner: Cayuga County Community College

History
- Call sign meaning: WD "WiN"

Technical information
- Facility ID: 9426
- Class: A
- ERP: 3,000 watts
- HAAT: 27.0 meters
- Transmitter coordinates: 42°56′40″N 76°32′33″W

Links
- Website: wdwn.fm

WDWN (89.1 FM) is a college radio station broadcasting an Alternative format. Licensed to Auburn, New York, United States, the station serves the Finger Lakes area. The station is owned by Cayuga County Community College. The station is also broadcast on HD radio.
