= WSSW =

Coordinates: 42.764°N 90.406°W

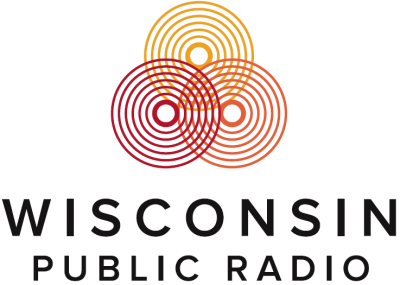
- Platteville, Wisconsin; United States
- Broadcast area: Plattteville
- Frequency: 89.1 MHz
- Branding: WPR News

Programming
- Language: English
- Format: Public radio, News
- Affiliations: Wisconsin Public Radio; NPR; American Public Media

Ownership
- Owner: State of Wisconsin - Educational Communications Board; (State of Wisconsin - Educational Communications Board)

History
- Call sign meaning: WiSconsin SouthWest

Technical information
- Licensing authority: FCC
- Facility ID: 91616
- Class: A
- ERP: 130 watts
- HAAT: 131.5 meters (431 ft)

Links
- Public license information: Public file; LMS
- Webcast: Listen Live
- Website: wpr.org

WSSW (89.1 FM) is a radio station licensed to Platteville, Wisconsin, United States. The station is part of Wisconsin Public Radio (WPR) and broadcasts WPR's News Network, consisting of news and talk programming.

== See also ==
- Wisconsin Public Radio
