= Moalboal =

Municipality in Cebu, Philippines

- Municipality
- Municipality of Moalboal
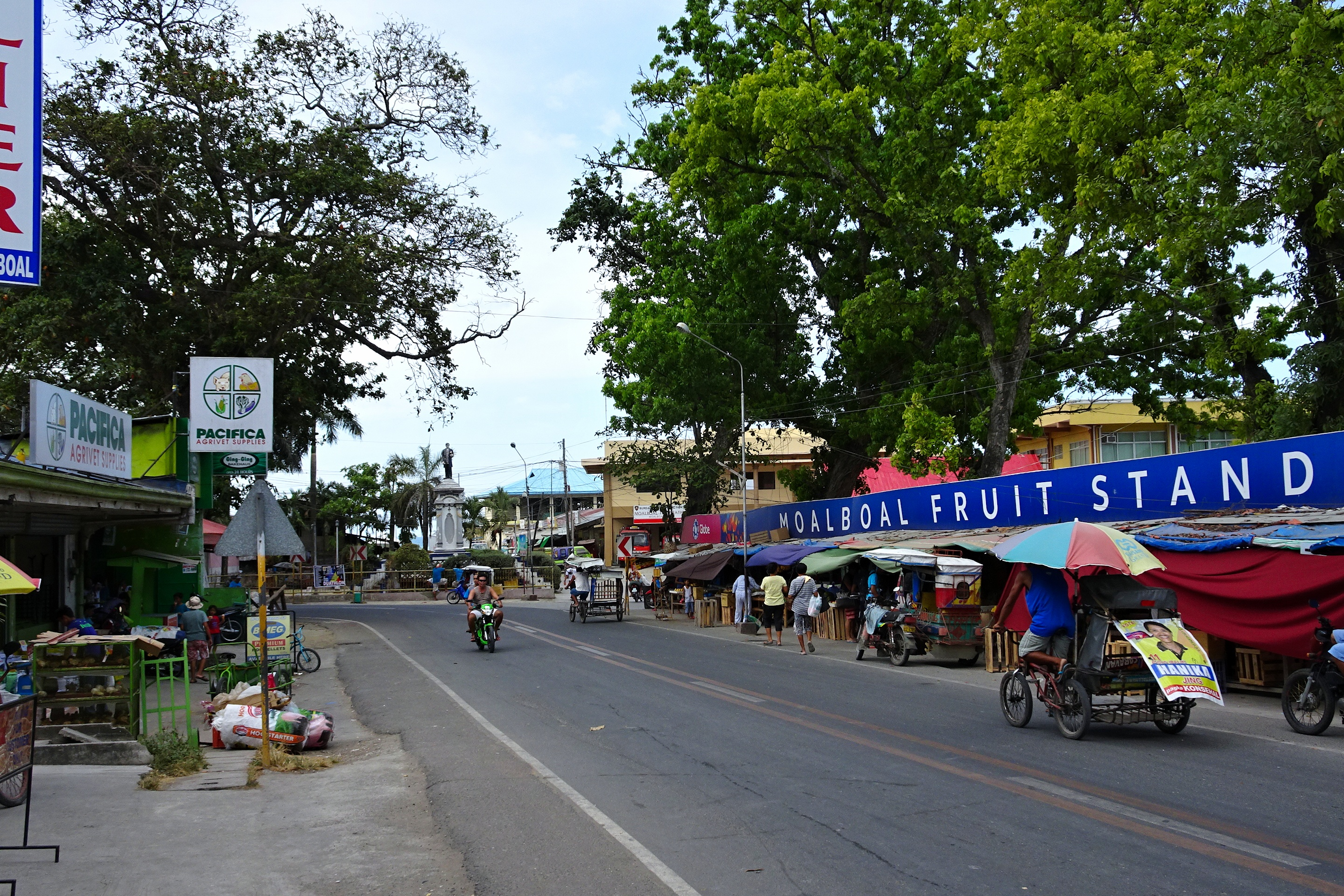
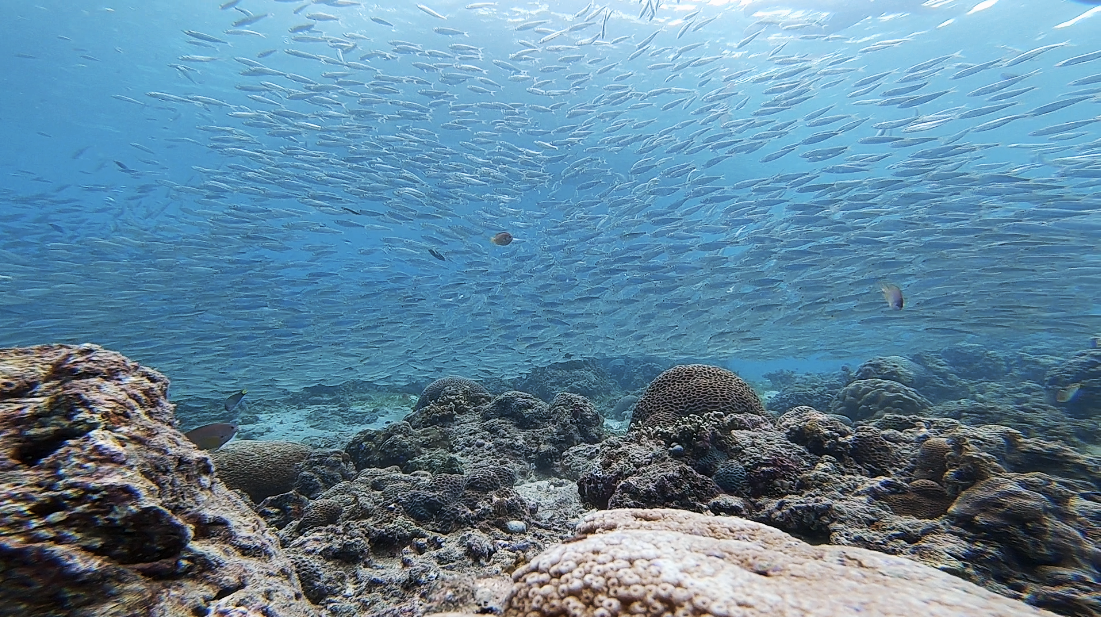
- Coastline Poblacion Moalboal sardine run

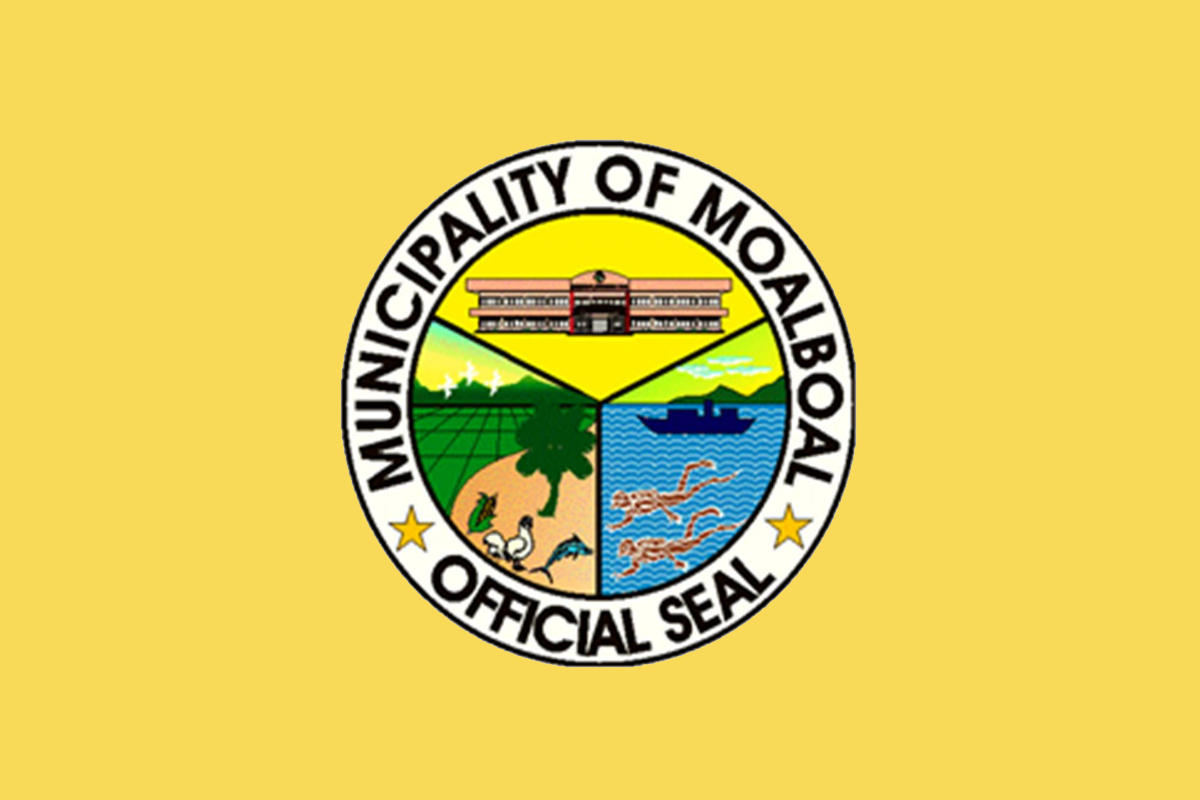
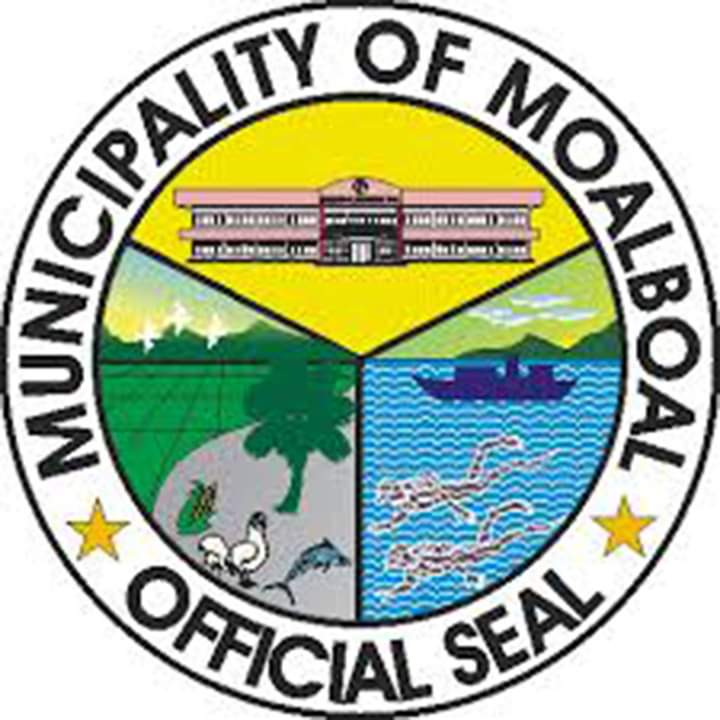
- Flag Seal
- Nickname: Dagway sa Paraiso
- Anthem: Moalboal Hymn
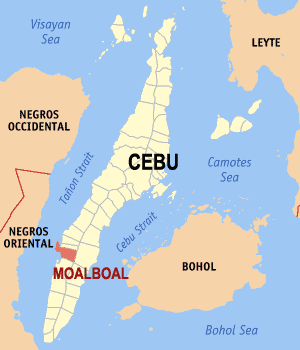
- Map of Cebu with Moalboal highlighted
- Interactive map of Moalboal
- Location within the Philippines
- Coordinates: 9°57′N 123°24′E
- Country: Philippines
- Region: Central Visayas
- Province: Cebu
- District: 7th district
- Founded: 6 February 1852
- Barangays: 15 (see Barangays)

Government
  - Type: Sangguniang Bayan
  - Mayor: Inocentes G. Cabaron
  - Vice mayor: Paz A. Rozgoni
  - Representative: Peter John D. Calderon
  - Municipal Council: Members: Jinky C. Hanika; Virgilio A. Domugho; Susan G. Billones; Zerg C. Tabañag; Marcelino D. Deniega; Cesar B. Mahinay; Richard P. Domugho; Alfonso F. Sabac Jr.
  - Electorate: 24,546 voters (2025)

Area
  - Total: 124.86 km^{2} (48.21 sq mi)
- Elevation: 30 m (98 ft)
- Highest elevation: 253 m (830 ft)
- Lowest elevation: 0 m (0 ft)

Population (2024 census)
  - Total: 37,993
  - Density: 304.28/km^{2} (788.09/sq mi)
  - Households: 8,582
- Demonym: Moalboalanon

Economy
  - Income class: 1st municipal income class
  - Poverty incidence: 26.94% (2023)
  - Revenue: ₱ 261.3 million (2024)
  - Assets: ₱ 588.7 million (2024)
  - Expenditure: ₱ 202.5 million (2024)
  - Liabilities: ₱ 108.2 million (2024)

Service provider
  - Electricity: Cebu 1 Electric Cooperative (CEBECO 1)
- Time zone: UTC+8 (PST)
- ZIP code: 6032
- PSGC: 072233000
- IDD : area code: +63 (0)32
- Native languages: Cebuano; Tagalog
- Major religions: Roman Catholicism
- Patron saint: John of Nepomuk
- Website: www.moalboal.gov.ph

Moalboal ([moʔˈalboʔˌal]), officially the Municipality of Moalboal (Cebuano: Lungsod sa Moalboal; Tagalog: Bayan ng Moalboal), is a municipality in the Philippine province of Cebu. According to the 2024 census, it had a population of 37,993 people.

Pescador Island, a popular tourist attraction, is part of the municipality and is one of the best-known diving sites in the Philippines.

== Etymology ==
Two distinct etymologies have been proposed for the origins of the town's name, both based on phonetic distortions. The first is an onomatopeic derivation from the bubbling sound called "bocalbocal" (bukál-bukál) in Cebuano, emitted by the waters of a spring located within the town proper. The second, and less popular version, relates to the belief that most of the town's first settlers are from the island of Bohol and are thus known as Boholanos, or Bol-anons. In both versions, it is believed that the word was eventually transformed into "Moalboal". A clue to the etymology of Moalboal may reside in its old orthography: Redondo's Breve Reseña de la Diocesis de Cebu en las Islas Filipinas spells the name of the town as "Mualbual". The same spelling is reflected on a page from Sale's Ang Sugbo sa Karaang Panahon, showing a map of Cebu province.

== History ==
=== Spanish colonial period ===
During the pre-colonial and early colonial periods in the Philippines, there existed a legend stating that Laurente Sabanal, popularly known as Laguno, or Llaguno, was the founder and first ruler of Moalboal. It was said that he was a Bol-anon with roots in Bohol, where he killed a guardia civil who abused him. He then escaped and eventually founded the town. People believed that he possessed supernatural abilities that included making objects float in the air. During frequent Moro attacks, he would use this ability to scare the Moro raiders and make them return to their vintas.

When Laguno died, his body was buried on the sandy shore where he had made a stand against the invaders. On his grave was placed a log that serves as a symbol of the respect for his heroism, bravery, and exemplary life. Laguno Street, along the shore where he was buried, is named after him.

=== Moalboal as a parish ===
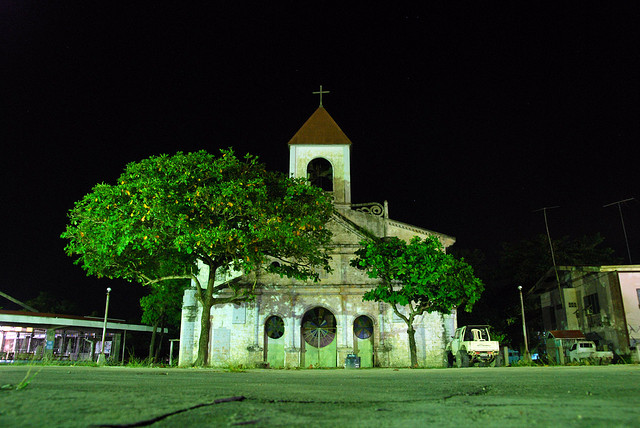
San Juan Nepumoceno Parish Church

During the Spanish era, the church and state were unified, which meant that the formation of a parish required the combined authority of both the bishop and the provincial governor. This authority was decreed by the Royal Order of July 31, 1874, which became effective in the Philippines from June 2, 1886, and was later revised by the Royal Decree of July 10, 1894. As a result of this arrangement, parishes in Cebu, including the town of Moalboal, were established by local religious authorities.

Sometime in the year 1851, the Spanish governor passed a decree approving a petition for the creation of Moalboal as a parish. By the following year, on January 20, 1852, the corresponding decree from the bishop was received. On February 6, 1852, San Juan Nepomuceno Parish, Moalboal, Cebu, was officially established.

=== American occupation ===
The Americans replaced the Spaniards as colonizers of the Philippines in 1899. In 1917, the town was declared to be an independent municipality separated from Alcantara (a former barrio of Moalboal).

=== Second World War ===
During the Japanese occupation of the Philippines and the Battle of Visayas, Filipino guerrillas fought the Japanese forces, and Moalboal was one of the locations in Cebu where Japanese soldiers surrendered. This is known as the Battle of Tomonoy, which took place on August 13, 1944.

No ancestral houses can be found in Moalboal, due to the town having been burned to the ground by the Japanese in retaliation for the successful ambush of their troops. The only remaining 18th-century structure is the San Juan Nepumoceno Parish Church, which currently only retains the belfry tower and exterior walls from its original construction.

== Geography ==
Moalboal is a peninsula situated on the southwestern coast of Cebu Island, bordered to the west by the Tañon Strait; Negros Island is visible from its shore. To the north of Moalboal is the town of Alcantara, to the east is Argao, and to the south is Badian. It is 105 kilometres (65 mi) south of Cebu City.

Moalboal is one of the eight municipalities comprising the 7th Congressional District of Cebu Province.

=== Barangays ===
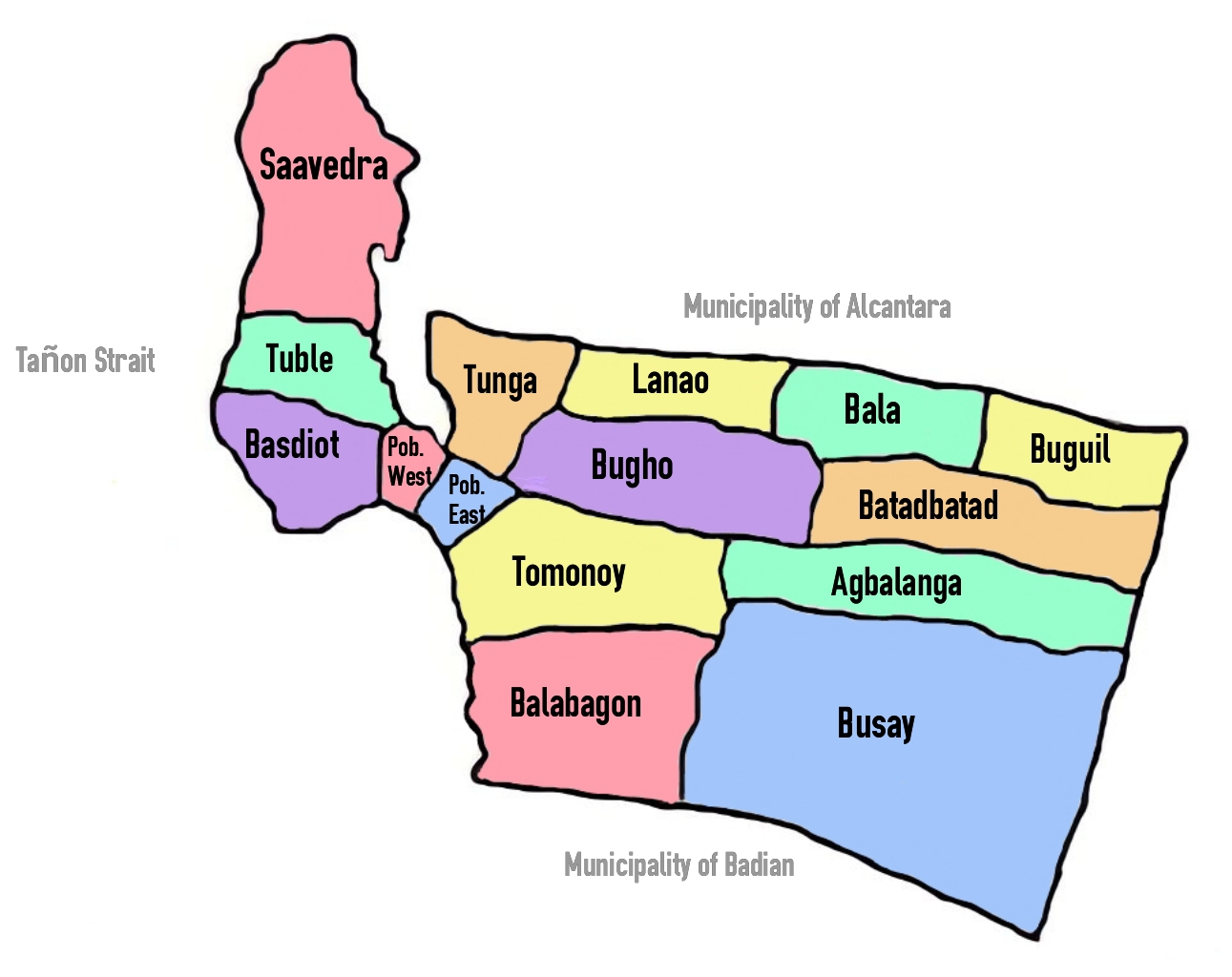
Map showing barangays of Moalboal

Moalboal is politically subdivided into 15 barangays. Each barangay consists of puroks, some of which have sitios.

PSGC	Barangay	Population			±% p.a.	
		2024		2010		
072233001	Agbalanga	2.5%	940	916	▴	0.18%
072233002	Bala	1.8%	700	697	▴	0.03%
072233003	Balabagon	4.8%	1,825	1,572	▴	1.04%
072233004	Basdiot	15.7%	5,949	5,291	▴	0.81%
072233005	Batadbatad	3.5%	1,318	1,248	▴	0.38%
072233006	Bugho	4.8%	1,824	1,430	▴	1.69%
072233007	Buguil	2.0%	756	710	▴	0.43%
072233016	Busay	3.4%	1,309	1,167	▴	0.80%
072233008	Lanao	3.7%	1,424	1,352	▴	0.36%
072233010	Poblacion East	6.6%	2,521	2,223	▴	0.87%
072233011	Poblacion West	8.5%	3,240	2,742	▴	1.16%
072233012	Saavedra	7.6%	2,881	2,618	▴	0.66%
072233013	Tomonoy	5.3%	2,018	1,874	▴	0.51%
072233014	Tuble	5.3%	2,012	1,591	▴	1.63%
072233015	Tunga	6.4%	2,413	2,245	▴	0.50%
	Total		37,993	27,676	▴	2.21%

The barangays of Basdiot, Balabagon, Poblacion East, Poblacion West, Tomonoy, Tuble, Tunga, and Saavedra are geographically classified as coastal, with four of them situated on the peninsula, while Agbalanga, Bala, Batadbatad, Buguil, Bugho, Busay, and Lanao are landlocked, with most being hilly and mountainous. Busay is the largest barangay in terms of land area.

=== Climate ===
The climate in Moalboal experiences a significant amount of rainfall, even during the month with historically low precipitation levels. Köppen and Geiger classify this climate as Af (tropical monsoon).

Climate data for Moalboal, Cebu
Month	Jan	Feb	Mar	Apr	May	Jun	Jul	Aug	Sep	Oct	Nov	Dec	Year
Mean daily maximum °C (°F)	29 (84)	30 (86)	31 (88)	32 (90)	31 (88)	30 (86)	30 (86)	30 (86)	30 (86)	29 (84)	29 (84)	29 (84)	30 (86)
Mean daily minimum °C (°F)	22 (72)	22 (72)	23 (73)	24 (75)	25 (77)	25 (77)	24 (75)	24 (75)	24 (75)	24 (75)	24 (75)	23 (73)	24 (75)
Average precipitation mm (inches)	42 (1.7)	34 (1.3)	40 (1.6)	61 (2.4)	124 (4.9)	188 (7.4)	190 (7.5)	191 (7.5)	189 (7.4)	186 (7.3)	124 (4.9)	73 (2.9)	1,442 (56.8)
Average rainy days	10.0	8.5	9.5	12.8	22.3	26.8	28.4	27.9	27.3	27.6	20.5	13.1	234.7
Source: Meteoblue (modeled/calculated data, not measured locally)

== Demographics ==
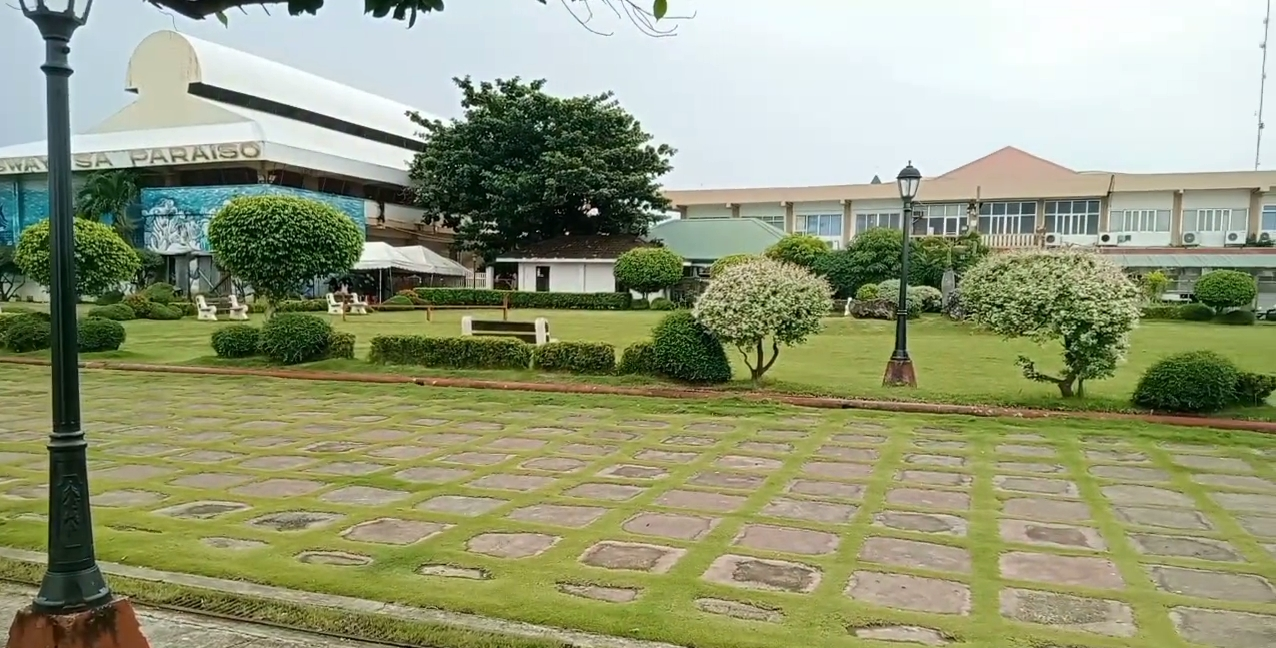
Moalboal Heritage Park

Population census of Moalboal
Year	Pop.	±% p.a.
1903	11,743	—
1918	14,897	+1.60%
1939	14,868	−0.01%
1948	15,019	+0.11%
1960	13,745	−0.74%
1970	15,679	+1.32%
1975	16,182	+0.64%
1980	16,420	+0.29%
1990	20,041	+2.01%
1995	22,021	+1.78%
2000	23,402	+1.31%
2007	27,398	+2.20%
2010	27,676	+0.37%
2015	31,130	+2.27%
2020	36,930	+3.66%
2024	37,993	+0.68%
Source: Philippine Statistics Authority

In the 2020 census, the population of Moalboal was 36,930 people, with a density of 296 inhabitants per square kilometre or 766 inhabitants per square mile.

Though the majority of the people in Moalboal are Cebuanos, members of cultural minorities also reside there.

=== Language ===
Most of Moalboalanons (people living in Moalboal) predominantly speak Cebuano, which is the most spoken language throughout Visayas and Mindanao. Filipino (the standardized version of Tagalog) and English are taught in schools, and both are used as a medium of instruction at all levels.

== Economy ==
Poverty incidence of Moalboal (%)

Source: Philippine Statistics Authority

Moalboal is a peninsula, and therefore, it is almost entirely surrounded by water. The majority of the people who live in the flat lands engage in fishing as their main mode of livelihood. Those who live in the mountain regions, such as Agbalanga, Bala, Batadbatad, Buguil, and Busay survive by farming.

The Tourism Infrastructure and Enterprise Zone Authority sees Moalboal as one of the major tourism investment destinations in the province for the years 2023–2028. It is one of the assigned urban service centers/corridors in the region, considered as the most suitable areas for urban development in the countryside. Cities and municipalities mentioned in the development proposal include Argao, Santander, and Tabuelan, the Danao City-Carmen corridor in Cebu province, and Getafe-Talibon in Bohol.

There are two operating shopping malls in the municipality, namely the Gaisano Grand Mall Moalboal and Gaisano Town Center Moalboal, both located in Poblacion East. Poblacion West, on the other hand, serves as the education and government center of the town. Both downtown barangays serve as centers of commerce. Areas of town popular with tourists are mostly around beaches, such as Basdiot, Tuble, and Saavedra, which include hotels, resorts, spas, bars, restaurants, and diving schools.

== Transportation ==
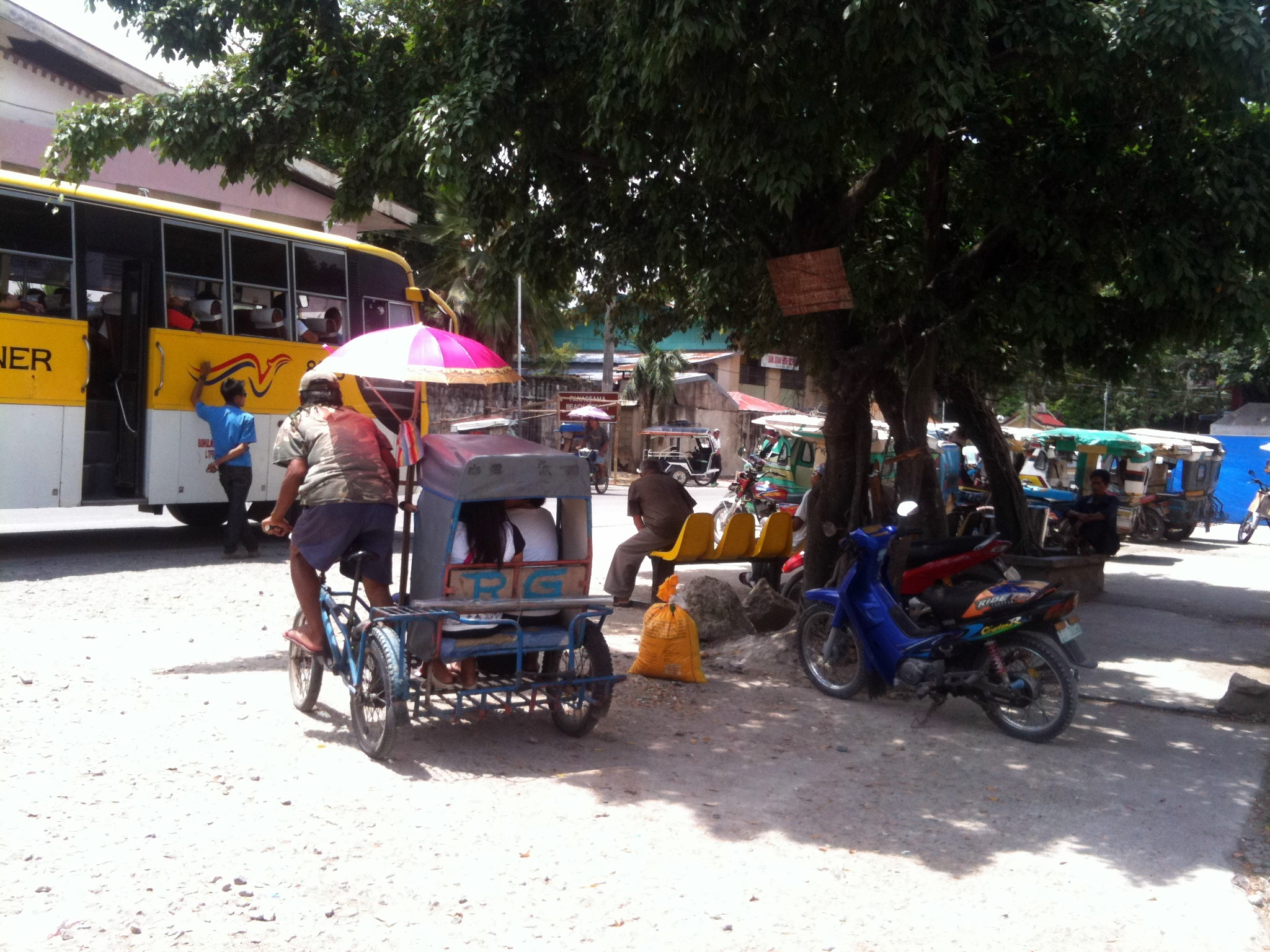
Bus stop going to Cebu City, located in the downtown area

The most common mode of transportation are bicycles with side cars, known locally as "pedicabs", or tricycles with side cars, called trisikads. There are also motorcycle taxis, known as habal-habal.

Several buses and vans-for-hire travel to or from Moalboal.

== Tourism ==
Children playing on Panagsama beach

Since the 1970s, Moalboal has developed a tourism industry based on recreational diving and beaches. Panagsama Beach (Basdiot), where most resorts and restaurants are situated, was chosen in 2024 by Condé Nast Traveler as one of the best in the Southeast Asian region and the only one in the country. Further north on the peninsula, in Saavedra, is White Beach (Basdako), a two-kilometre (1.2 mi) beach that used to be mostly frequented by locals but has since attracted international tourists. Both Panagsama Beach and White Beach are located 3–5 kilometres (1.9–3.1 mi) away from Moalboal's main bus stop.

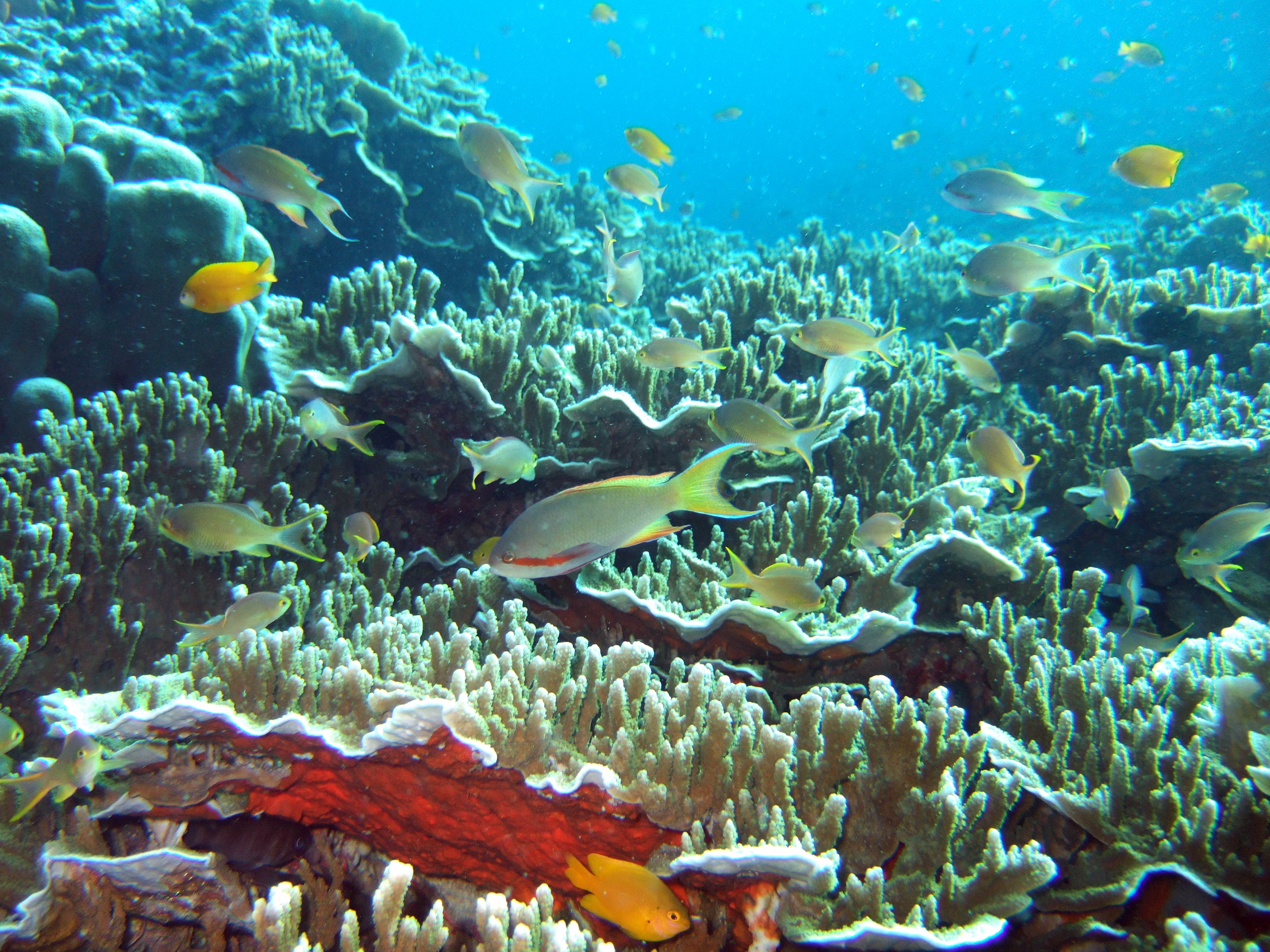
Coral reef

Recreational diving is the main tourist activity in Moalboal, and reefs along the west coast of the Copton peninsula are home to a great variety of marine life. Pescador Island, about 3 kilometres (1.9 mi) off the coast, is the most popular dive spot, with an underwater cave known as "the Cathedral". Close to the coastline is a drop-off descending to more than 40 metres (130 ft). The area is also known to be a home for sea turtles as well as a vast school of sardines. Whale sharks, dolphins, and thresher sharks are also seen.

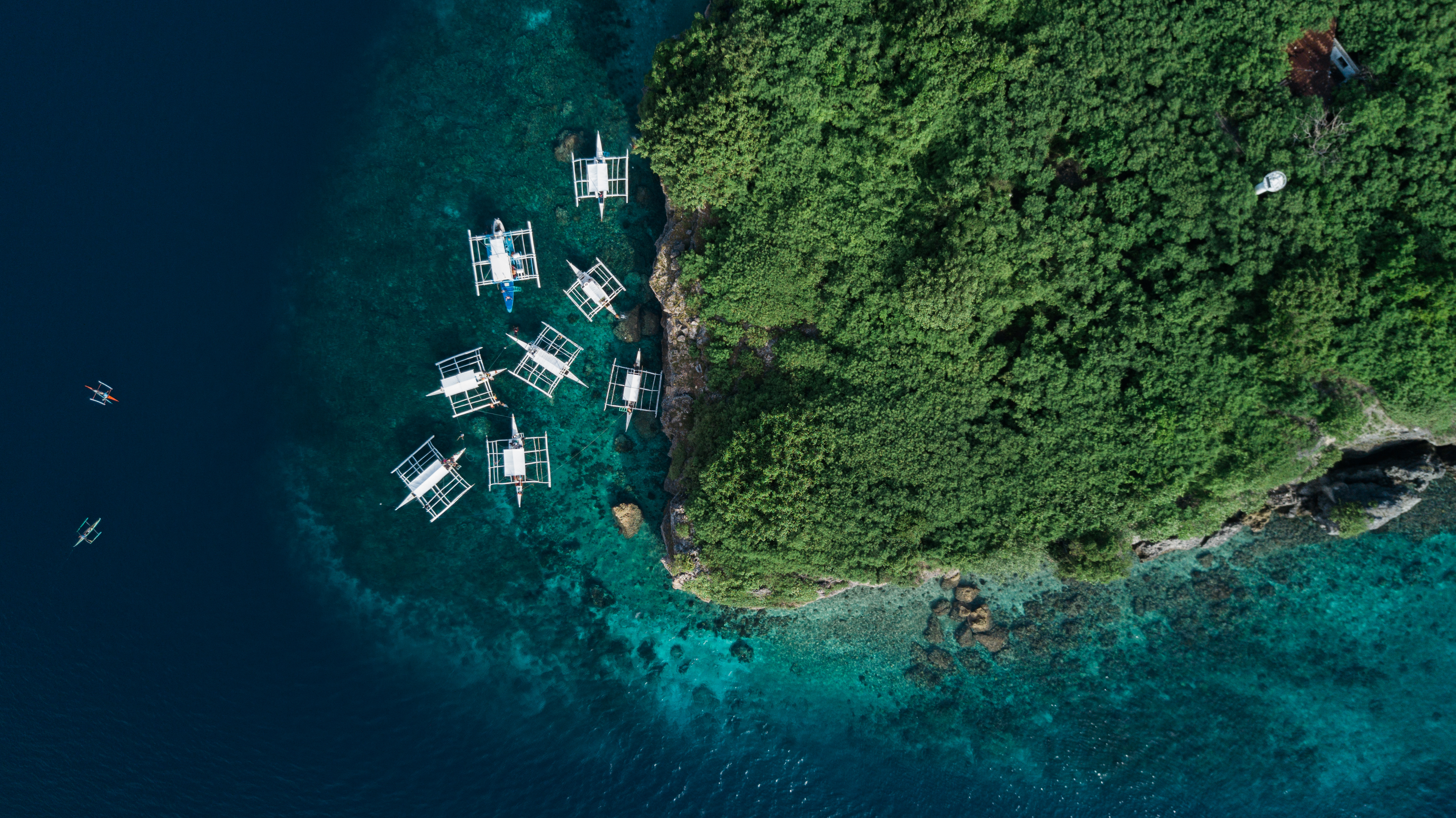
Aerial view of Pescador Island

Other tourist attractions in Moalboal include:

- Airplane Wreck (dive site) – located in Saavedra, the airplane is approximately 7m down the slope at the wall's edge, at 20m of depth. The airplane was placed there as a dive attraction in 1993.
- Batadbatad Falls – locally known as Taginis falls, a hidden and less popular waterfall located in barangay Batadbatad.
- Budlot Spring – a freshwater spring located in barangay Bala.
- Busay Cave – a spring inside a cave that provides potable water to the town.
- Magpayong Rocks – also known as "Mushroom rocks", is a tidal rock formation located at the northernmost seashore of White Beach in Saavedra.
- Moalboal Heritage Park – also known as "Seaside Park". It is located at the back of the municipal hall and sports complex.
- Rizal Monument – a José Rizal statue located along the highway that runs through Moalboal
- Talisay Wall (dive site) – located at the southern part of Panagsama Beach, in Basdiot. The shallow reef top is covered with hard corals. Talisay Wall is full of black coral, sea fans, sponges, and various sea creatures.
- Tongo Point (dive site) – also known as Tongo Marine Sanctuary, it is a protected area of Moalboal. The reef is covered with hard and soft corals, a steep drop-off, and a great variety of marine life.
- Tomonoy Valley (rice field) – a vast rice field located along the highway of barangay Tomonoy
- Tulay (Wharf) – located near Seaside Park and the wet market. With fruit stands and multi-purpose buildings, the wharf serves as a base point for island-hopping to Pescador Island.
- Tuble Marine Sanctuary (dive site) – one of the protected areas of Moalboal, located in barangay Tuble.

Moalboal also serves as a base for other activities, such as canyoneering in Badian and Kawasan Falls, 20 kilometres (12 mi) away from Moalboal.

=== Kagasangan Festival ===
The annual feast of Moalboal is held on May 15 and 16. Moalboal is also known for its "Kagasangan Festival" (from the Cebuano word gasang, which translates to "coral"). The festival symbolizes the town's rich marine life and features music, with dancers dressed in colorful costumes depicting the sea's flora and fauna. It is held in honor of San Juan Nepumoceno.

== Education ==
The public schools in the town of Moalboal are administered by one school district under the Schools Division of Cebu Province.

Elementary schools

- Agbalanga Elementary School — Agbalanga
- Bala Elementary School — Bala
- Balabagon Elementary School — Balabagon
- Basdiot Elementary School — Basdiot
- Batadbatad Elementary School — Batadbatad
- Buguil Elementary School — Buguil
- Busay Elementary School — Busay
- Lanao Elementary School — Lanao
- Moalboal Central Elementary School — Poblacion West
- Omay Elementary School — Sitio Omay, Busay
- Saavedra Elementary School — Saavedra
- Tomonoy Primary School — Tomonoy
- Tuble Elementary School — Tuble
- Tunga Elementary School — Tunga

Integrated schools

- Bugho Integrated School (formerly Bugho Elementary School) — Bugho
- Moalboal Tourism Management Integrated National High School — Balabagon

Secondary schools

- Bala National High School — Bala
- Busay National High School — Busay
- Moalboal National High School — Basdiot

Private schools

- Moalboal Christian School Inc.— Tunga
- Nuevo School of Technology and Humanities — Tunga
- Our Lady of Mount Carmel Learning Center — Tunga
- San Juan High School of Moalboal, Cebu Inc. — Poblacion West

College/university

- Cebu Technological University – Moalboal Campus (formerly Cebu State College of Science and Technology – College of Fisheries) — Poblacion West

== Gallery ==
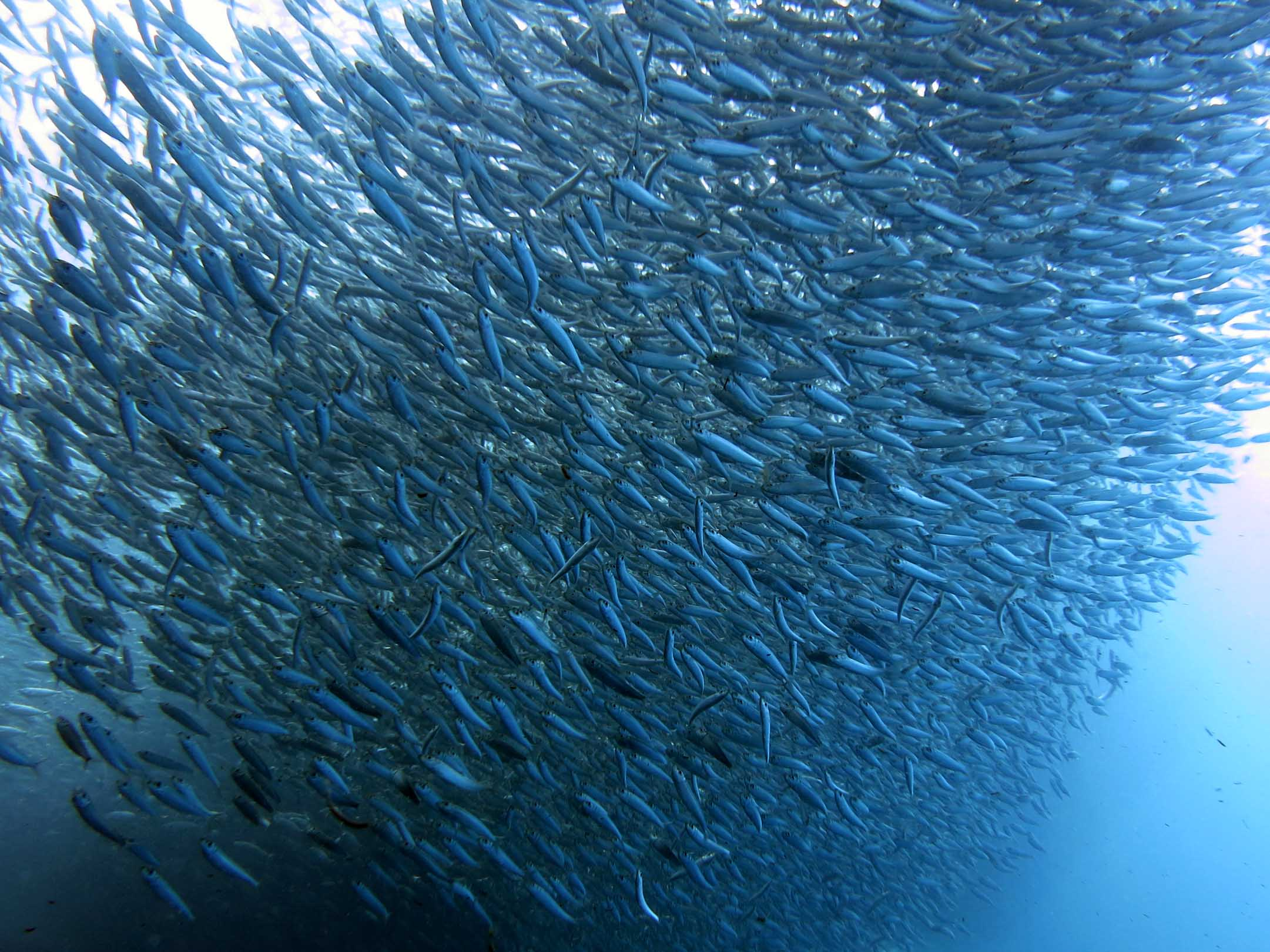
Sardine run in Moalboal

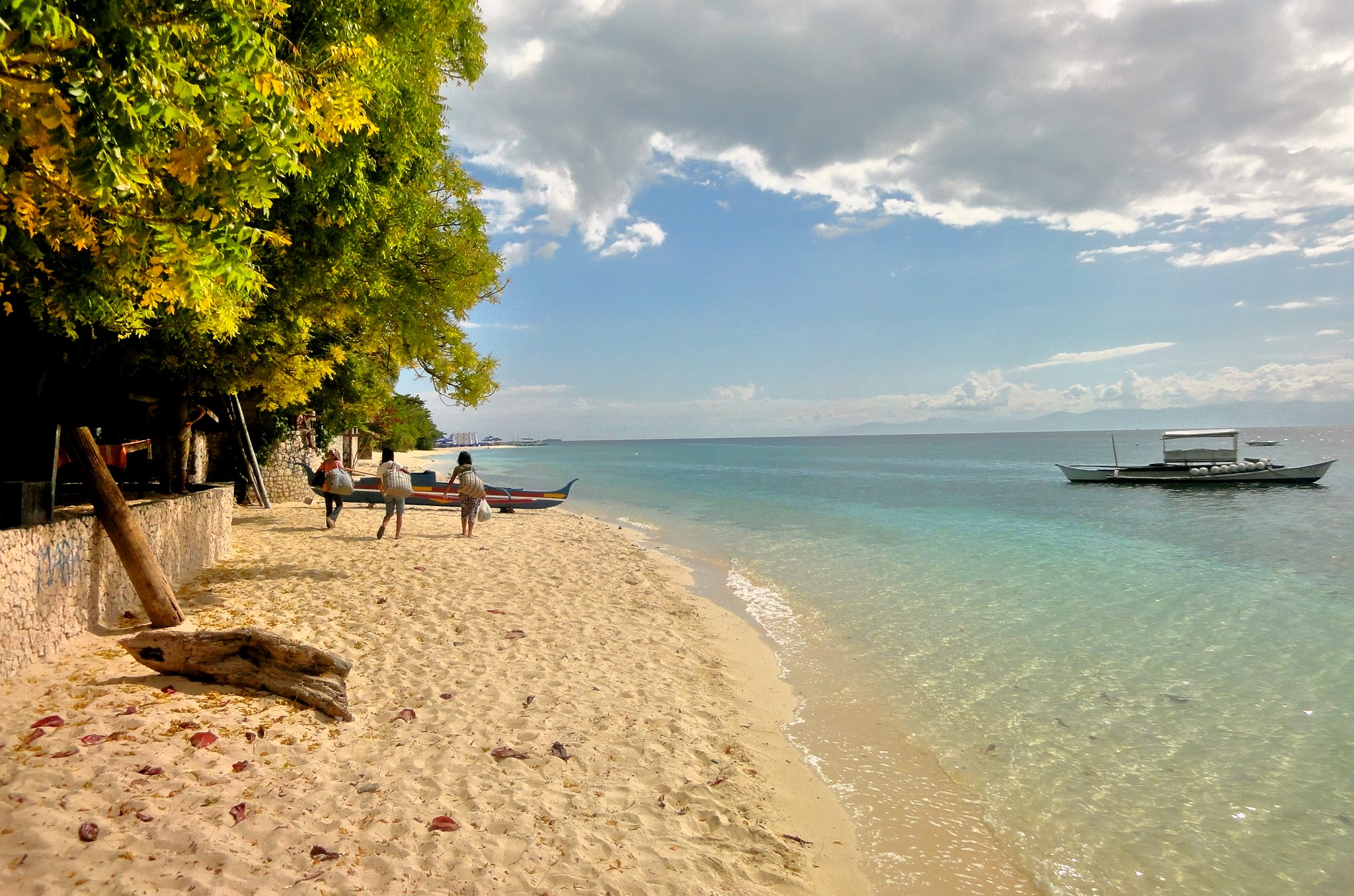
Basdako (White Beach)

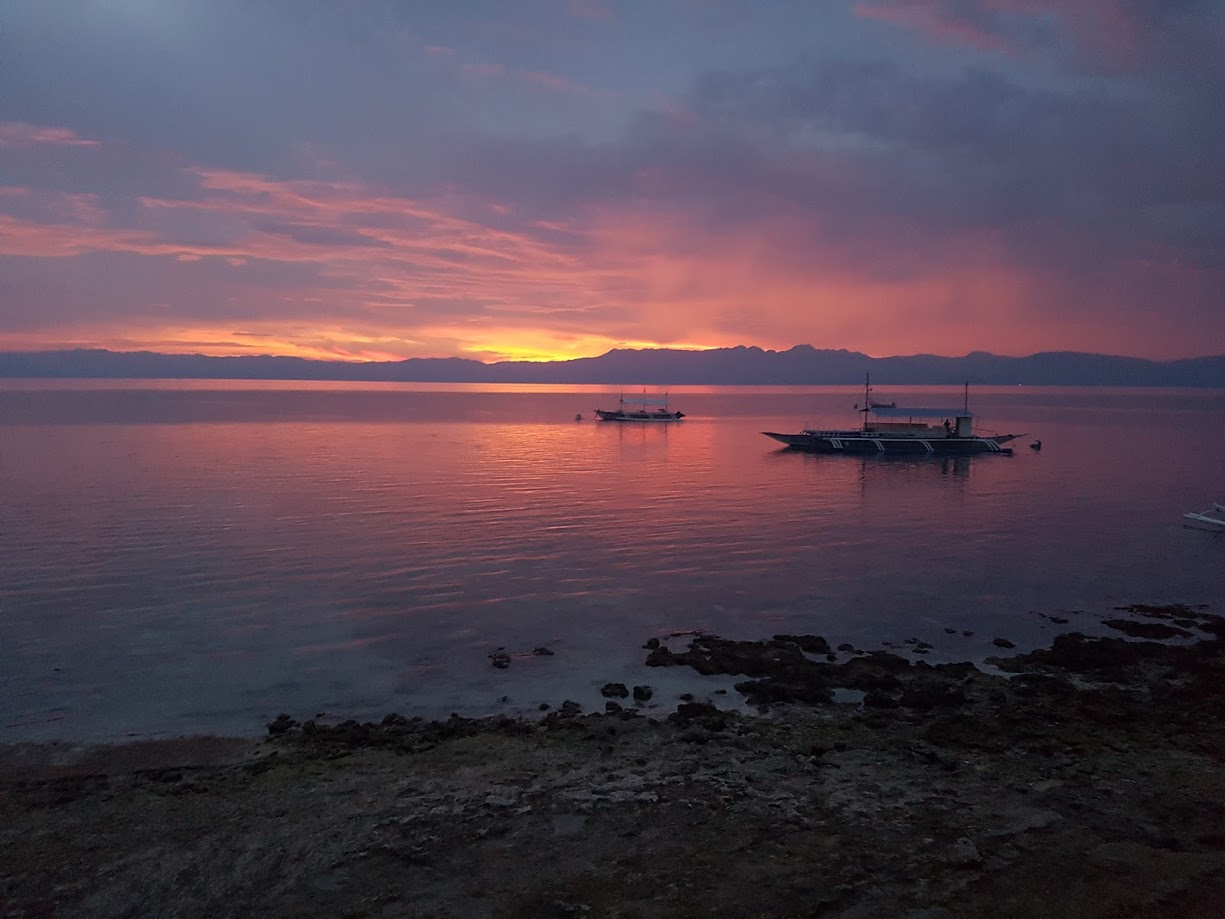
Sunset near Moalboal

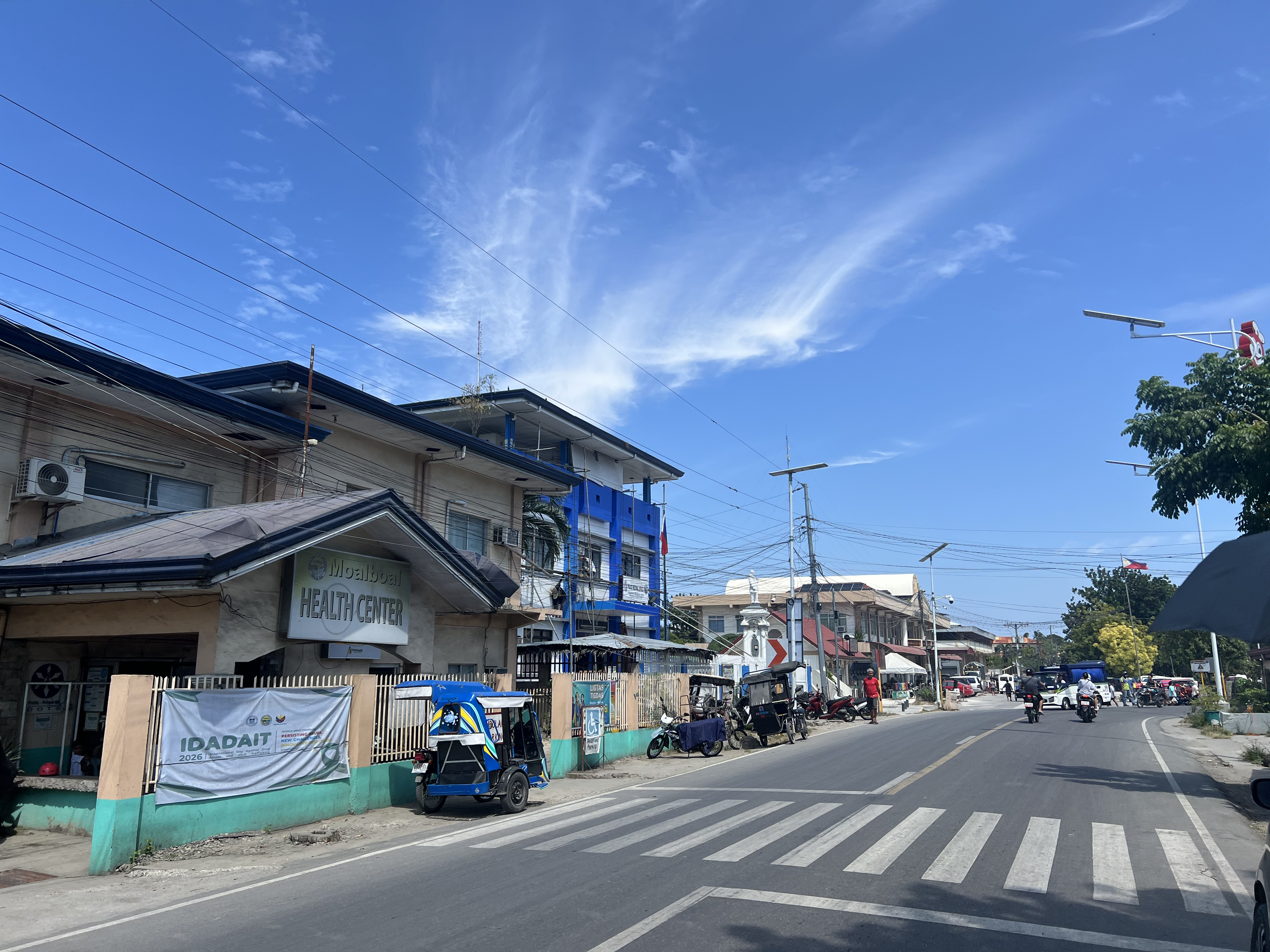
Local Health Center

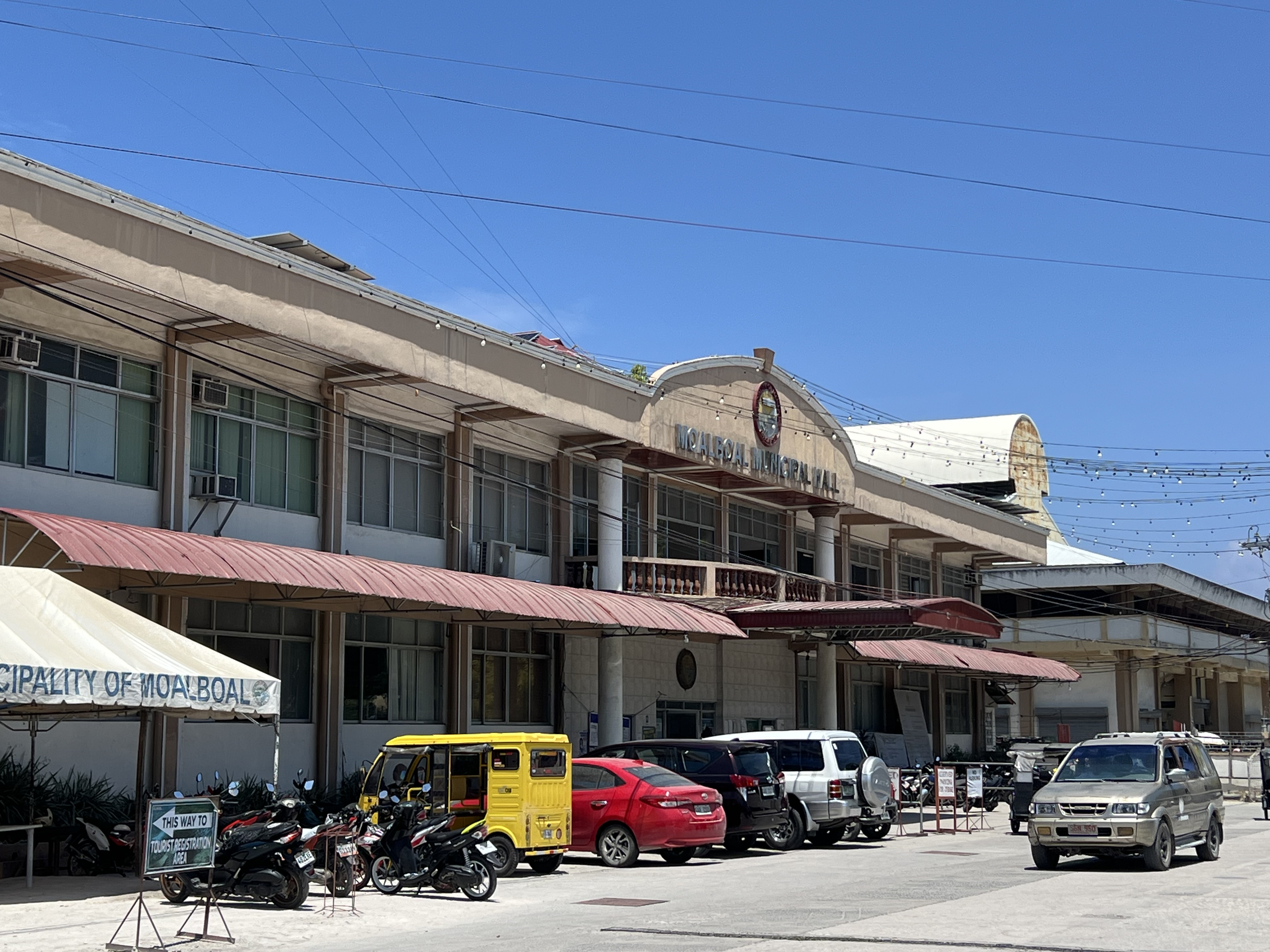
Moalboal Municipal Hall, Laguno Street

== See also ==
- Legislative districts of Cebu
- List of islands of Cebu
- List of beaches in the Philippines
