= KLPI =

Radio station at Louisiana Tech University in Ruston, Louisiana

- Ruston, Louisiana; United States
- Frequency: 89.1 MHz

Programming
- Format: Alternative rock

Ownership
- Owner: Louisiana Tech University

History
- First air date: March 29, 1973 (on FM)
- Former call signs: WLPI (as a carrier current AM station)
- Call sign meaning: K Louisiana Polytechnic Institute (the former name of Louisiana Tech University)

Technical information
- Licensing authority: FCC
- Facility ID: 38615
- Class: A
- ERP: 4,000 watts
- HAAT: 87 meters
- Transmitter coordinates: 32°31′41.00″N 92°38′50.00″W

Links
- Public license information: Public file; LMS
- Webcast: Live Stream
- Website: KLPI.latech.edu

KLPI is a non-commercial educational college radio station owned by Louisiana Tech University in Ruston, Louisiana. The station is licensed by the Federal Communications Commission (FCC) to broadcast at 89.1 MHz with an effective power of 4 kW. It is also licensed to operate a studio to transmitter microwave link, call sign WHQ444. KLPI is student-operated and allows any Louisiana Tech student to become a member of the radio station. The music selection is primarily a mix of alternative rock, college rock, indie, and mainstream rock; however, requests from almost any genre are also accepted.

== History ==
KLPI was founded to maintain interest in radio as a communication medium. The radio station began as carrier current AM outlet "WLPI" in 1966. Electrical engineering students from a graduate-level class studying carrier currents used their own money to rent an office on Railroad Avenue in downtown Ruston and founded the start-up and operation of WLPI. The letters LPI in the station's call sign were selected to represent Louisiana Polytechnic Institute, the name of the university before it was renamed Louisiana Tech University. WLPI's founders included Robert Downs, Rhett McMahon, John Brewer, and Dalton Williams; the first studio was in McMahon's dormitory room serving McFarland Hall and Jenkins Hall with surplus transmitters modified to transmit on 770 AM. After the first year of operations, the small group of students petitioned the student union for funding to expand coverage to additional dormitories. McMahon, Brewer and Williams buried coaxial cable across the campus, expanding WLPI's reach to all of the campus dormitories.

After three years of operation, Louisiana Tech University and the university's Student Government Association brought the radio station onto the Tech campus and housed them in a room in the Dramatic Arts building (now known as Howard Auditorium).

In 1972, Louisiana Tech received a construction permit for a new 10-watt FM station, to bear the call letters KLPI. The station went on the air March 29, 1973; it was the first noncommercial station in Louisiana located north of New Orleans. The carrier current station ceased operations the next year after maintenance problems developed with the equipment.

KLPI moved out of Howard Auditorium in 1982 due to renovations at the auditorium. The radio station moved around several times on Tech campus that year before finding its home for the next 20 years in a double-wide mobile home at 900 Gilman Street on Louisiana Tech's South Campus in Ruston. That same year, KLPI was approved to relocate its transmitter to the Wyly Tower of Learning, the tallest building in Ruston, and increase its power.

By 1998, with the trailer rapidly deteriorating, KLPI partnered with the Louisiana Tech School of Architecture to design a new studio in the former Tech Express store near the Student Center on the main campus. The final accepted design featured a unique circular broadcast booth in the center of the building. Construction was completed in the spring quarter of 1999 and the new studio officially began operating that summer.

Elephant 6 founders Will Cullen Hart and Jeff Mangum were associated with the radio station during their early period in Ruston.

== See also ==
- Campus radio
- List of college radio stations in the United States
