= WLKB =

Radio station in Bay City, Michigan

- Bay City, Michigan; United States
- Broadcast area: Saginaw-Bay City-Midland
- Frequency: 89.1 MHz
- Branding: K-LOVE

Programming
- Format: Contemporary Christian
- Affiliations: K-LOVE

Ownership
- Owner: Educational Media Foundation

History
- First air date: July 27, 1993
- Former call signs: WTRK (1993–2006)

Technical information
- Licensing authority: FCC
- Facility ID: 5064
- Class: C2
- Power: 50,000 watts
- HAAT: 113 meters
- Transmitter coordinates: 43°33′42″N 83°58′52″W

Links
- Public license information: Public file; LMS
- Website: www.klove.com

WLKB (89.1 FM) is a radio station broadcasting a contemporary Christian format. Licensed to Bay City, Michigan, it is a member of the K-LOVE radio network. The transmitter is located on Hotchkiss Drive near Delta College, and its signal reaches from the West Branch area southward to north of Flint and westward to Mount Pleasant.

The station began broadcasting on July 27, 1993 as "The Rock" WTRK, a locally-originating Christian CHR/Rock station. The station was popular in local ratings due to providing an edgier-styled Christian music format not available elsewhere in the area at the time. However, with only 2,000 watts of power the station's signal did not reach far outside Bay City.

WTRK dropped local programming in 2004 to affiliate with Educational Media Foundation's Air 1 format. Two years later, EMF purchased the station outright and began the process of upgrading WTRK's signal from 2,000 to 50,000 watts. On December 18, 2006, WTRK swapped programming and calls with K-Love sister station WLKB 90.9 FM licensed to Freeland, Michigan.
