= WYTC-LP =

- Hyde Park, Vermont; United States
- Broadcast area: North Central Vermont
- Frequency: 89.1 MHz

Programming
- Affiliations: Green Mountain Technical and Career Center

Ownership
- Owner: Lamoille Union High School District #18

Technical information
- Licensing authority: FCC
- Facility ID: 134111
- Class: L1
- ERP: 100 watts
- HAAT: −92.0 meters (−301.8 ft)
- Transmitter coordinates: 44°36′5.00″N 72°37′51.00″W

Links
- Public license information: LMS

WYTC-LP (89.1 FM) is a radio station licensed to Hyde Park, Vermont, United States. The station is owned by Union High School District #18.

89.1 FM is run by Lamoille Union Middle and High school students. The studio is located in the Green Mountain Technical and Career Center.
