= WBCX =

Radio station at Brenau University

89.1 WBCX
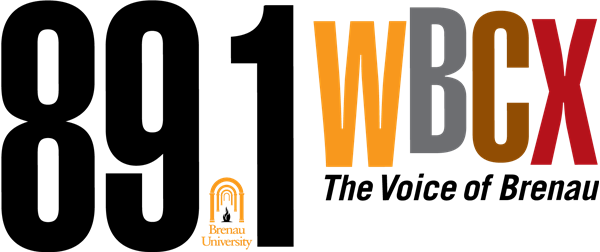

Gainesville, Georgia; United States
- Broadcast area: northeast Georgia (Atlanta market)
- Frequency: 89.1 MHz
- Branding: 89.1 WBCX

Programming
- Format: Variety: pop, jazz & classical music
- Affiliations: NPR

Ownership
- Owner: Brenau University; (Brenau University)

History
- First air date: September 26, 1977
- Call sign meaning: Brenau College EXperiment

Technical information
- Licensing authority: FCC
- Facility ID: 6706
- Class: A
- ERP: 840 watts
- HAAT: 166 meters (545 ft)
- Transmitter coordinates: 34°19′1.00″N 83°49′45.00″W

Links
- Public license information: WBCX Public file; LMS
- Webcast: Listen Live
- Website: WBCX website

89.1 WBCX FM is a student radio station licensed to Gainesville, Georgia, and owned by Brenau University. WBCX serves Hall and parts of surrounding counties in northeast Georgia, as far as northeastern metro Atlanta.

== History ==
WBCX began in 1976 as an experiment, broadcasting 10 watts to the college campus and immediate area only. The station expanded to the whole Gainesville area on September 26, 1977, as the city's first non-commercial and educational radio station. This was increased to 840 watts in 1986, enabling the station to reach well beyond campus. Instrumental in the station's creation were Brenau Trustee and Jacobs Media Corporation Chairman John W. Jacobs, Jr., Journalism Professor Clara Martin, and Professor James Bridwell, among others. The first WBCX student station manager hired by Brenau was Jay Andrews.

Throughout the 1980s WBCX played easy listening music from a reel to reel and cartridge automation system located at the studios of WDUN radio. In 1995 the station switched to a smooth jazz format with computerized automation from the Jones Smooth Jazz Network, playing an average of 22 hours per day of satellite fed programming with a handful of local jazz and classical music shows.

Scott Fugate was hired as General Manager in 2002 and WBCX started to move away from satellite programming towards live locally produced shows. In 2005, after two years of surveying the community and students for suggestions, the station took on the new label of "Brenau University's Eclectic 89.1 WBCX" - premiering 10 new "eclectic" formats grouped by mood rather than musical genre, with different moods for each day & night with a goal to reach all the diverse ages, races & cultures in the area. Free training was offered to community volunteers interested in producing their own live shows, and many new student shows were premiered over the next several years. BBC news and several syndicated shows were also added. In 2006, the majority of programming was produced in the studios at Brenau University, with live and all request shows every evening. The station's name & formats were changed once again in the fall of 2009 - changing "Eclectic 89.1" to "The Voice Of Brenau" - and eliminating the majority of live shows, as well as the jazz and classical programming.

2012 brought a new focus on WBCX by the university, which re-hired Jay Andrews to manage forward the station's programming and the school's digital technology.

== See also ==
- Campus radio
- List of college radio stations in the United States
