= WIDR =

Radio station in Kalamazoo, Michigan

89.1 WIDR FM
- Kalamazoo, Michigan; United States
- Broadcast area: Coverage Area
- Frequency: 89.1 MHz
- Branding: Your Source for Radio Evolution

Programming
- Format: Variety; college student station; Non-commercial

Ownership
- Owner: Western Michigan University

History
- First air date: 1952 (carrier current on AM); July 7, 1975 (on FM)
- Call sign meaning: Western Inter-Dormitory Radio

Technical information
- Licensing authority: FCC
- Class: A
- ERP: 100 watts
- HAAT: 57 meters (187 ft)
- Transmitter coordinates: 42.2820°N 85.6181°W

Links
- Public license information: WIDR FM Public file; LMS
- Webcast: https://widrfm.net/stream
- Website: https://www.widrfm.org/

WIDR (89.1 FM) is a freeform FM radio station that broadcasts from Western Michigan University in Kalamazoo, Michigan. WIDR, a student-run radio station licensed to Western Michigan University, broadcasts with 100 watts of power. The station is entirely student-run, employing six to eight part-time staff members. Staff members must be students at Western Michigan University, enrolled at least part-time. Even though the station is student-run, a number of community volunteers hold on-air positions as well.

== History ==
The station originally began broadcasting in 1952, as a carrier current station. The station was started by a small group of students including Jack Clifford, who later went on to found the Food Network. The station broadcast through the pipes of Western Michigan University; specifically throughout the dormitories. Thus, they picked W.I.D.R., or Western Inter-Dormitory Radio, as their call letters.

For the first 23 years, WIDR broadcast as an AM station on 750 kHz. In 1975, the student-staff filed paperwork with the Federal Communications Commission (FCC) to become an FM station. They were given a frequency of 89.1 MHz, and allowed to broadcast at a power of 100 watts. The station went on the air on July 7, 1975. WIDR is classified by the FCC as a non-commercial, educational station.

Today, the station goes by the moniker WIDR (pronounced "wider") and continues to serve both Western Michigan University and the Kalamazoo community.

At the 2025 Intercollegiate Broadcasting System Conference Awards, WIDR FM won the award for Best College Station.

== Programming ==
WIDR's programming consists of a combination of variety music shows, specialty music shows and public affairs shows.

Variety music shows draw music from within the WIDR's own music library. The library comprises mainly CDs and Vinyl from a number of non-mainstream or alternative record labels and represents styles ranging from alternative, jazz and hip-hop to electronic, world and experimental music.

Experienced DJs are allowed to develop programming focusing on specific genres of music. Programs such as "Hip Hop Ethics" radio program (hip hop), "Electro City" (EDM), "The College Wave" (college rock) and "The World Is A Neighborhood" (world) are some examples of these programs. Other specialty programs can include live performance acts in WIDR's studio spaces.

Some DJs choose, instead of a specialty music program, to develop a public affairs program. These are generally talk or interview-based programs focusing on subjects from current events to local culture.

== Funding ==
89.1 WIDR FM is primarily funding by students through the student assessment fee, though significant contributions are made from community members and WIDR Alumni, as well as underwriting agreements.

Western Michigan University Board of Trustees hold the license to WIDR, and as such provides WIDR with mostly in-kind services. These include the use of on-campus office space, electricity, internet access and the like.

== Special Events ==
WIDR has hosted a number of special events on Western Michigan University's campus and in the city of Kalamazoo.

Past WIDR festivals included Barking Tuna Festival, Kite Flight, and the WIDR Block Party (2012-2015).

Past BTF headliners have included The New Pornographers, Spoon, Mission of Burma, Stephen Malkmus, Mates of State, RJD2, Tiny Lights, The New Duncan Imperials, Dan Deacon, Lighting Bolt, and King Khan & The Shrines.

== Notable alumni ==
- Terry Crews
- Tim Allen
- Jack Clifford (founder of the Food Network)
- Greg Jennings

== See also ==
- Campus radio
- List of college radio stations in the United States
