= WYBF =

- Radnor Township, Pennsylvania; United States
- Broadcast area: Philadelphia metropolitan area
- Frequency: 89.1 MHz
- Branding: Cavalier Radio

Programming
- Format: Defunct (was College radio)

Ownership
- Owner: Cabrini College

History
- First air date: 1991
- Last air date: August 25, 2022

Technical information
- Facility ID: 8127
- Class: A
- ERP: 700 watts
- HAAT: 68 meters (223 ft)

WYBF (89.1 FM, "Cavalier Radio") was a college radio station which broadcast in the Philadelphia area via a 700 watt transmitter that covered a 15-mile radius around Radnor, Pennsylvania; the station was owned by Cabrini College. WYBF had a freeform type of format, which allowed the student DJs to create their own playlists; however most of the music played on WYBF was of the modern rock genre.

The station's license was cancelled by the Federal Communications Commission (FCC) on August 25, 2022, at the request of the licensee. The closure of WYBF came after Cabrini College agreed to end its share-time agreement with Villanova University's WXVU; as part of the deal, Cabrini will be paid $125,000 upon FCC approval of WXVU's application for full-time operation. The "Cavalier Radio" programming continues to operate as an Internet radio station.
