= KGFN =

Radio station in Goldfield, Nevada

- Goldfield, Nevada; United States
- Frequency: 89.1 MHz
- Branding: "KGFN 89.1"

Programming
- Format: Community radio

Ownership
- Owner: Radio Goldfield Broadcasting Inc.

Technical information
- Licensing authority: FCC
- Facility ID: 175110
- Class: A
- ERP: 1,000 watts
- HAAT: 65.3 metres (214 ft)
- Transmitter coordinates: 37°43′37.1″N 117°13′32.5″W
- Translators: K221AR (92.1 MHz, Hawthorne)

Links
- Public license information: Public file; LMS
- Webcast: Listen Live
- Website: www.kgfn.org

KGFN (89.1 FM) is a radio station licensed to serve the community of Goldfield, Nevada. The station is owned by Radio Goldfield Broadcasting Inc., and airs a community radio format.

The station was assigned the KGFN call letters by the Federal Communications Commission on March 18, 2011.

== Translator ==
KGFN rebroadcasts on the following translator, owned by Mineral Television District #1.

Broadcast translator for KGFN
| Call sign | Frequency | City of license | FID | ERP (W) | HAAT | Class | FCC info |
|---|---|---|---|---|---|---|---|
| K221AR | 92.1 FM | Hawthorne, Nevada | 42706 | 50 | 937 m (3,074 ft) | D | LMS |
