= WOFM (FM) =

- Alcoa, Tennessee; United States
- Broadcast area: Knoxville, Tennessee
- Frequency: 89.1 MHz
- Branding: Air1

Programming
- Format: Christian worship
- Affiliations: Air1

Ownership
- Owner: Educational Media Foundation

History
- First air date: February 14, 1993; 33 years ago
- Former call signs: WYLV (1987–2011)
- Call sign meaning: "Worship FM"

Technical information
- Licensing authority: FCC
- Facility ID: 22014
- Class: C2
- ERP: 1,850 watts
- HAAT: 427 meters
- Transmitter coordinates: 36°0′13″N 83°56′34″W

Links
- Public license information: Public file; LMS
- Webcast: Listen Live
- Website: air1.com

WOFM (89.1 MHz) is a non-commercial, non-profit Christian FM radio station in the Knoxville, Tennessee area owned by Educational Media Foundation.

WYLV began in February 1993 broadcasting on 89.1 FM with programming from the Morning Star network. In September 1999, the station changed to a local format with onsite staff and DJs.

In 2016, WOFM had the 6th most social media activity in Knoxville. It was one of the radio stations which took up 6 out of 10 spots in the Knoxville social media rankings for that year, and made the most social media posts of those stations.

On January 1, 2011, WOEZ became an affiliate of the Air 1 network after being sold to Educational Media Foundation. Later in January, the WYLV call letters were moved to the 88.3 frequency, as an affiliate of the K-LOVE network. At that time, Air1 moved to WOFM, which had been WYLV.
