= KSRP (FM) =

KSRP-FM
- Dodge City, Kansas; United States
- Broadcast area: Dodge City, Kansas
- Frequency: 89.1 MHz
- Branding: 89.1 KSRP

Programming
- Format: Christian

Ownership
- Owner: Bible Baptist Church of Dodge City, Inc.

History
- First air date: 2012

Technical information
- Licensing authority: FCC
- ERP: 1,000 watts
- HAAT: -7.6 meters
- Transmitter coordinates: 37°43′17″N 99°57′19″W

Links
- Public license information: Public file; LMS
- Website: Official website

KSRP is a radio station licensed to Dodge City, Kansas, United States. It airs a Christian format. The station went silent for a year from October 2013 to October 2014.
