= KQCV =

KQCV may refer to:

- KQCV (AM), a radio station (800 AM) licensed to Oklahoma City, Oklahoma, United States
- KQCV-FM, a radio station (95.1 FM) licensed to Shawnee, Oklahoma, United States
