= WFCV =

WFCV may refer to:

- WFCV (AM), a radio station (1090 AM) licensed to Fort Wayne, Indiana, United States
- WFCV-FM, a radio station (100.1 FM) licensed to Bluffton, Indiana
