= KREF =

KREF may refer to:

- KREF (AM), a radio station (1400 AM) licensed to serve Norman, Oklahoma, United States
- KOKQ, a radio station (94.7 FM) licensed to serve Oklahoma City, Oklahoma, which held the call sign KREF-FM from 2021 to 2023
