= Dave Garrett =

American sportscaster

- Born: Okemah, Oklahoma, U.S.
- Education: Oklahoma State University; University of Central Oklahoma
- Occupations: Sportscaster; Sports radio host, Play-by-play Broadcaster.
- Spouse: Rajeana
- Children: Allison, Alicia

Dave Garrett is an American former sportscaster. He was the play-by-play announcer for the New Orleans Saints, Dallas Cowboys, and Westwood One radio coverage of the National Football League (NFL) through 2001.

== Early life and education ==
Garrett was raised in Henryetta, Oklahoma, where he attended Henryetta High School. He began his broadcasting career in 1975 at the age of 15 at KHEN-AM 1590/FM 99.5 and broadcast play-by-play for Henryetta High School in 1976 and 1977 seasons. He attended Oklahoma State University from 1978 to 1983.

== Early career ==
After Oklahoma State, Garrett was a broadcaster for KSPI from 1978 to 1986. He was a fill in play-by-play broadcaster of Oklahoma State Cowboys football games in 1985 for Bob Barry Sr. (while Barry recovered from heart bypass) and also did spot play-by-play for OSU basketball.

From 1986 to 1987, he was the sports director at WKY in Oklahoma City, and from 1987 to 1992 was a sports talk host on KTOK in Oklahoma City and worked OU football games on the Oklahoma News Network.

== NFL Broadcasting ==
=== New Orleans Saints ===
Garrett became the radio play by play announcer for the New Orleans Saints in 1992. He shared the broadcast booth with Archie Manning and Jim Henderson. He also became the sports director of WQUE. Midway through the 1993 season, Garrett was relieved of his broadcasting duties after he reportedly overslept and missed a portion of a pregame show prior to a game against the Green Bay Packers. Henderson, the Saints' play-by-play announcer from 1985 to 1989, returned to that role and remained there through the 2017 season.

=== Dallas Cowboys ===
Prior to the 1995 season, Dallas Cowboys radio play-by-play broadcaster Brad Sham left to become the announcer for the Texas Rangers. Garrett was hired to replace Sham.

While with the Cowboys, Garrett shared the booth with Dale Hansen, and broadcast the Cowboys victory in Super Bowl XXX. He remained in the booth for three seasons until Sham returned to the Cowboys prior to the 1998 season.

== Post NFL ==
Garrett later worked for Oral Roberts University as Director of Marketing/Radio-TV (1999-2003) and play-by-play voice for both Men's and Women's basketball teams (1999-2004). For the 2003 season only, he was the play-by-play voice for the Oklahoma Redhawks aka the Oklahoma City Dodgers of the Pacific Coast League. In early 2004, Garrett was informed by the then new Redhawks ownership & management he was being let go for the 2004 season in favor of bringing back former broadcaster Jim Byers.

Later in 2004, Garrett took a job hosting an afternoon drive sports talk show with KREF 1400 from mid 2004 to 2005 when he was let go due to low ratings. In 2006, he returned to his old job as sports director at KTOK-AM and its new sister station KGHM (AM) 1340, prior to that in the Fall of 2005 he was cohost of Friday Night Finals, a weekly local High School Football highlight show aired on KGHM (AM) 1340 or sister station KTOK-AM showcasing game scores and results from around the state during the High School football season. He also hosted a weekday afternoon sports show on KGHM (AM) 1340 before briefly ending the show for a few months to focus on his duties as station sports director. He returned to 1340 as host until he was among the employees who lost their jobs as part of nationwide layoffs at Clear Channel Communications in 2012. During his time with both KREF and KGHM (AM) Garrett returned to his roots calling various local area Friday night High school football games for those stations.

From 2013 to 2018, Garrett hosted a local show called "DG On The Radio" on KRXO-FM. Garrett was the play-by-play broadcaster for Central Oklahoma Bronchos football and Men's and Women's basketball teams from 2007 to 2017.
