= WFMQ =

- Lebanon, Tennessee; United States
- Broadcast area: Nashville metropolitan area
- Frequency: 91.5 MHz

Programming
- Affiliations: Bott Radio Network

Ownership
- Owner: Bott Broadcasting Company; (Community Broadcasting, Inc.)
- Sister stations: WECV

Technical information
- Licensing authority: FCC
- Facility ID: 14728
- Class: A
- ERP: 500 watts
- HAAT: 25.0 meters (82.0 ft)
- Transmitter coordinates: 36°12′13.00″N 86°18′1.00″W

Links
- Public license information: Public file; LMS
- Webcast: Listen live
- Website: bottradionetwork.com/station/91-5-fm-lebanon-tn/

WFMQ (91.5 FM) is a radio station licensed to Lebanon, Tennessee, United States, the station serves the Tennessee college area. The station is currently owned by Bott Broadcasting Company and is an owned-and-operated station of the Bott Radio Network, functioning as a repeater of WECV (89.1 FM) in Nashville. The station has obtained a construction permit from the FCC for a power increase to 1,000 watts.

Previously owned by Cumberland University, after taking over in late 2012/early 2013, the EAO Presidents completely re-branded the formally debunked student radio station creating a fully automated system with hundreds of songs from various genres not usually played on air including genres like Electronica, Nu Jazz, and Death Metal.

This re-brand stayed until August 2015 when the EAO presidents graduated.

The station was sold to Community Broadcasting Inc. effective December 18, 2018. It now carries programming from the Bott Radio Network based in Kansas City.
