= KOKQ =

Classic rock radio station in Oklahoma City

- Oklahoma City, Oklahoma; United States
- Broadcast area: Oklahoma City Metroplex
- Frequency: 94.7 MHz (HD Radio)
- Branding: Q94.7

Programming
- Format: Classic rock
- Subchannels: HD2: "98.5 El Patrón" (Regional Mexican); HD3: Simulcast of HD2

Ownership
- Owner: iHeartMedia; (iHM Licenses, LLC)
- Sister stations: KGHM, KJYO, KTOK, KTST, KXXY-FM

History
- First air date: May 1967
- Former call signs: KEBC (1966–1996); KNRX (1996–1997); KQSR (1997–2002); KHBZ-FM (2002–2010); KBRU (2010–2021); KREF-FM (2021–2023)
- Call sign meaning: Oklahoma's Q

Technical information
- Licensing authority: FCC
- Facility ID: 11964
- Class: C0
- ERP: 100,000 watts
- HAAT: 372 meters (1,220 ft)
- Transmitter coordinates: 35.597833°N 97.48975°W
- Translators: HD2: 98.5 K253BV (Oklahoma City); HD2: 98.5 K253AY (Norman)

Links
- Public license information: Public file; LMS
- Webcast: Listen live (via iHeartRadio); HD2 and HD3: Listen live (via iHeartRadio)
- Website: q947fm.iheart.com; 985elpatron.iheart.com (HD2 and HD3)

KOKQ (94.7 FM) is a commercial radio station located in Oklahoma City, Oklahoma. KOKQ airs a classic rock format branded as "Q94.7". Owned by iHeartMedia, its transmitter is located in Northeast Oklahoma City, and studios are located 6525 North Meridian Avenue in Oklahoma City.

KOKQ, along with the other iHeart stations in Oklahoma City, simulcasts the audio of KFOR-TV if a tornado warning or other disasters are issued within the Oklahoma City metro viewing area.

== Prior stations on 94.7 in Oklahoma City ==
The current KOKQ license is the third to operate on 94.7 in Oklahoma City.

=== KOCY-FM: 1946-1950 ===
The first was KOCY-FM, which was the first FM station to broadcast in the state, opening on September 16, 1946. Initially broadcasting on 98.5 MHz, KOCY-FM was co-owned with KOCY (1340 AM). KOCY-FM quickly increased its effective radiated power, to 3,000 watts in January 1947; it changed frequencies to 94.7 in mid-1947.

A year later, KOCY-FM activated a new transmitter site and increased its power to 70,000 watts, claiming "the tallest exclusive FM tower in the world". KOCY-FM was additionally used to feed eight AM stations in a statewide network that began operations in September.

KOCY-FM ceased operations in 1950. Its tower was acquired by station KOMA (1520 AM) for use in broadcasting television.

=== KEFM/KMWC: 1958-1965 ===
It would be another eight years before a new 94.7 station operated; on August 17, 1958, Carl E. Williams opened KEFM, offering a "fine music" format. The fine music outlet was hit with staff turmoil in 1960 when it moved to a more upbeat music policy during the daytime hours; former station manager Earl Thomas claimed no involvement with the change.

1963 saw an even larger change; the station moved to Midwest City and adopted a new KMWC call sign to reflect its home. KMWC, along with KJEM-AM-FM, carried daily radio broadcasts from Tinker Air Force Base. However, Williams made an ill-advised move; he leased the station for six months in 1964 to Marlin Joe Pershall without Federal Communications Commission approval. In March 1965, the FCC fined Williams $1,000. Later that year, the station was deleted, and the FCC set aside the fine that December.

== History ==
=== Country: 1965-1996 ===
The Electronic Broadcasting Company applied on October 9, 1965, to build a new FM radio station on 94.7 in Oklahoma City. The FCC approved its application for a construction permit on August 17, 1966, and KEBC—named for the owner—signed on in May 1967. The station was a country music outlet, and the KEBC call sign was often referred to and became a monicker for the station known as "Keep Every Body Country" instead of the Electronic Broadcasting Company, broadcasting from studios at 3920 SE 104th Street on the city's southeast side; in 1970, the studios were moved to 830 SW 31st Street.

In 1971, Ralph Tyler and Harold McEwen bought a majority share in KEBC, and a new tower facility followed in 1973. KEBC established itself as a force in the market; it pulled double-digit ratings in each year between 1979 and 1982, fighting with KKNG and KTOK for the top spot in Oklahoma City. However, KEBC gained a formidable competitor on May 27, 1982, when KXXY-FM flipped to country. The more aggressive KXXY-FM edged ahead of KEBC in 1983 and would widen its lead to eight ratings points by the end of the decade.

While KXXY-FM surged, KEBC was sold several times. Van Wagner Broadcasting, which only owned two outlets in Michigan, bought the station from Ralph Tyler for $4 million in 1986. Two years later, Van Wagner sold KEBC to Independence Broadcasting for $3.9 million. Independence would see a return on its investment when Clear Channel Communications, forerunner to iHeartMedia, acquired KEBC for $7.5 million in 1993.

=== Alternative rock: 1996-1997 ===
We see this as one of the last great opportunities for a format that has swept the country and somehow missed this market. But we'll make up for lost time.

— Fred Jacobs, KNRX consultant as an alternative station

After 28 years in the country format, KEBC relaunched on July 8, 1996 as an alternative rock station known as "95X", adopting the call sign KNRX. It was the market's first station in the format.

=== Soft adult contemporary: 1997-2002 ===
However, less than 18 months later, another change came. On November 7, 1997, after repeating "A Change Would Do You Good" by Sheryl Crow for an hour, KNRX became soft adult contemporary KQSR, seeking to target the 35–44 audience and citing the duplication of alternative music on stations in other formats in Oklahoma City.

=== Alternative rock: 2002-2008 ===
The station returned to alternative on July 8, 2002, and became KHBZ-FM "The Buzz", stunting beforehand with a buzzing noise played over the soft rock songs and notifying listeners that their "technicians were working to get 'the Buzz' out". Starting with the 2006-07 NBA Basketball season, KHBZ-FM also served as the flagship station/Master control (Simulcasting to the Hornets radio network back in Louisiana.) for the New Orleans/Oklahoma City Hornets Basketball team, replacing sister station KTOK that served as the Hornets flagship station/Master control for the 2005-06 NBA season.

=== Active rock: 2008-2009 ===
On January 11, 2008, at 5 p.m., the station began stunting with all-Metallica, relaunching the following Monday with an active rock format. Despite a format emphasizing active rock and some classic rock titles, KHBZ-FM was still placed on the alternative rock panel by Radio & Records/Nielsen BDS.

By the spring of 2009, KHBZ-FM had adopted Clear Channel's syndicated Premium Choice active rock format, becoming musically identical outside of morning drive to sister stations KIOC in Beaumont, Texas and WHRL in Albany, New York.

=== Classic/mainstream rock: 2009-2021 ===
On December 29, 2009, KHBZ-FM flipped to 1980s-based classic rock, branded as "The Brew." With the flip, the station changed its call sign to KBRU. The station's initial slogan was "Classic Rock's Next Generation".

Since adopting the "Brew" moniker, KBRU shifted between rock formats on several occasions. In 2012, the station began playing more recent titles, bringing it closer to the music mix heard on the former KHBZ-FM; later in the year, the station added more classic rock titles, eventually moving fully to classic rock as a competitor to KQOB. Since 2015, when the station moved back to mainstream rock, KBRU had oscillated between classic and mainstream rock formats.

=== Sports: 2021-2023 ===
On August 18, 2021, at 6 a.m., after playing "The End" by The Doors, KBRU flipped to sports, branded as "94.7 The Ref", under new a KREF-FM call sign. For overnight programing, the station simulcasted Fox Sports Radio along with other sports stations in the Oklahoma City radio market, including sister station KGHM, KREF in Norman (which the station simulcast as part of a partnership and affiliation between iHeart Oklahoma City and Metro Radio Group, KREF's owner), and KZLS in Enid.

The Oklahoma City Comets Pacific Coast League Minor League baseball team affiliate of the Los Angeles Dodgers baseball team broadcast some select games on KREF-FM, specifically those conflicting with college football game broadcasts and other events on AM sister station KGHM, the team's primary flagship radio station.

=== Classic rock: 2023-present ===
On August 7, 2023, iHeart Oklahoma City announced it would end the KREF-FM partnership and affiliation with Metro, and the station would change to a different format at 6 p.m. on August 18 (exactly two years to the day after launch). While KREF-FM still retained the sports talk format after that time, it would drop all Metro-sourced programs and run Fox Sports Radio programming simulcasted with sister station KGHM full-time as an interim move.

On October 31, 2023, at midnight, KREF-FM dropped the sports talk format and, after playing the Jimi Hendrix cover of "The Star-Spangled Banner" and an old station identification from the station's time under the KBRU call sign, flipped back to classic rock as "Q94.7", and changed call letters to KOKQ. The station launched with a "Two-For Tuesday", playing sets of two consecutive songs from the same artists all day, starting with Whitesnake's "Here I Go Again" and "Is This Love". KOKQ features WFBQ Indianapolis host Dave "Gunner" Gunn in mornings. The move brought a full-fledged, full-powered classic rock format back to the area for the first time since KRXO had dropped the format from its primary signal in 2013. Despite the format and call letter change from sports talk and KREF-FM, KOKQ-FM still serves as an alternate station, broadcasting some select games of the Oklahoma City Comets Minor League baseball team, specifically those conflicting with college football game broadcasts and other sports events on AM sister station KGHM, the team's primary flagship radio station.

== Translators ==
Broadcast translators for KOKQ-HD2
Call sign	Frequency	City of license	FID	ERP (W)	HAAT	Class	FCC info
K253BV	98.5 FM	Oklahoma City, Oklahoma	140403	130	190 m (623 ft)	D	LMS
K253AY	98.5 FM	Norman, Oklahoma	148125	250	53 m (174 ft)	D	LMS

KOKQ's HD2 sub-channel carries a regional Mexican format branded as "El Patrón", and is simulcasted on two translators.
