= KGHM =

KGHM may refer to:

- KGHM Polska Miedź, a mining & metallurgy company in Poland
- KGHM (AM), a radio station (1340 AM) licensed to Midwest City, Oklahoma City, United States
