= Dickson, Tennessee =

- City
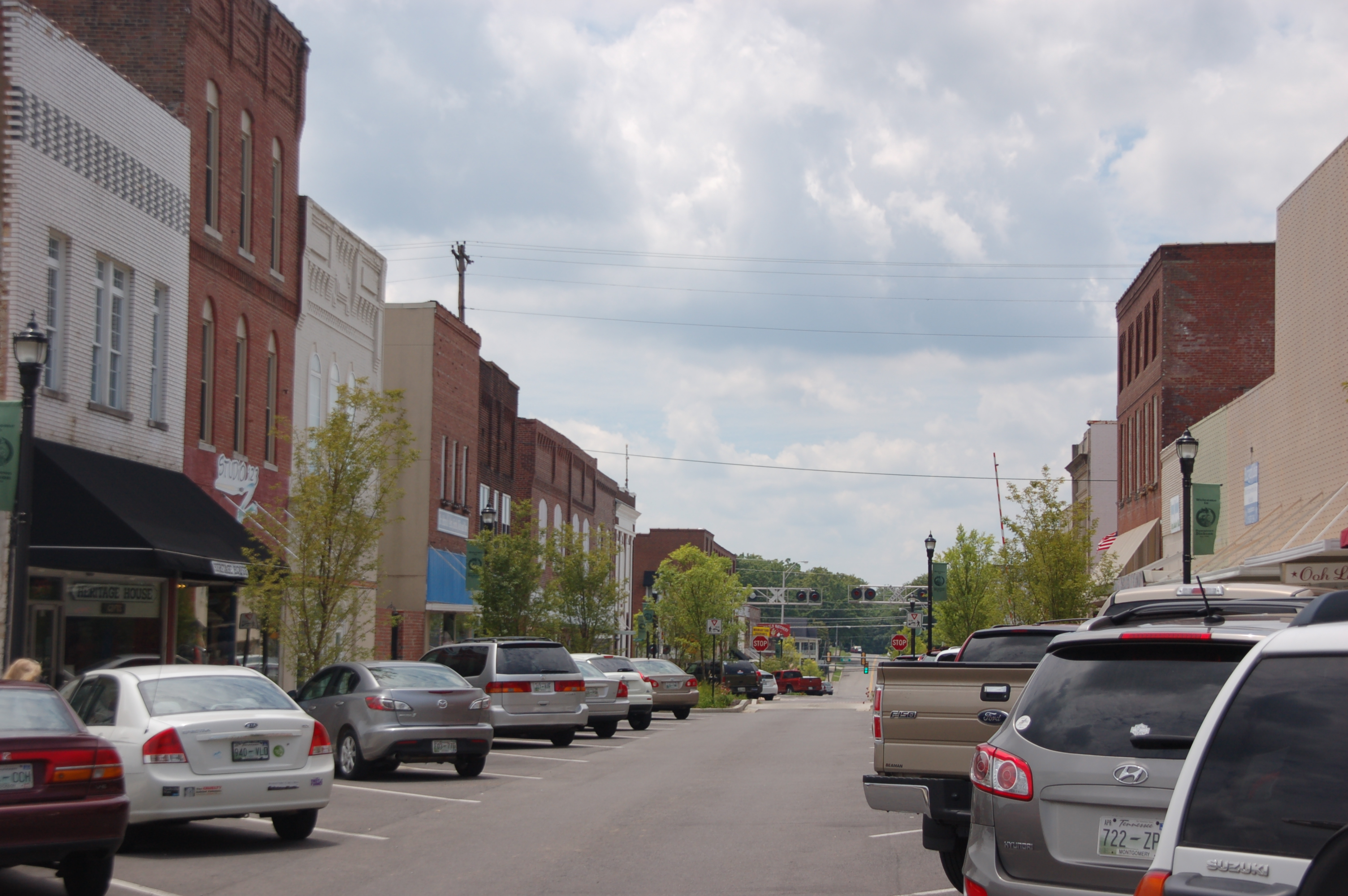
- Downtown business district of Dickson

- Location of Dickson in Dickson County, Tennessee.
- Coordinates: 36°4′17″N 87°22′28″W
- Country: United States
- State: Tennessee
- County: Dickson

Government
  - Mayor: Don L. Weiss Jr.
  - Chief of Police: Seth Lyles
  - Fire Chief: Richard Greer

Area
  - Total: 20.41 sq mi (52.85 km^{2})
  - Land: 20.32 sq mi (52.64 km^{2})
  - Water: 0.081 sq mi (0.21 km^{2})
- Elevation: 804 ft (245 m)

Population (2020)
  - Total: 16,058
  - Density: 790.1/sq mi (305.06/km^{2})
- Time zone: UTC-6 (Central (CST))
  - Summer (DST): UTC-5 (CDT)
- ZIP codes: 37055-37056
- Area code: 615
- FIPS code: 47-20620
- GNIS feature ID: 1303436
- Website: www.cityofdickson.com

Dickson is a city in the U.S. state of Tennessee. Located in Dickson County. It is part of the Nashville metropolitan area. As of the 2020 census, Dickson's population was 16,058.

== History ==
Dickson was named for Congressman William Dickson, as was Dickson County. The City started as a stop on the railroad line between Nashville and the Tennessee River. When Union Troops had finished the supply line during the Civil War, the area was known as Mile 42 post.

It is disputed on what the community was known as prior to being named Dickson. Dr. Robert Corlew's book A History of Dickson County makes the claim that the community was named Sneedsville in honor of a railroad engineer named Sneed who helped complete the tracks under the orders of General Ulysses S. Grant. Various other sources also state that the city was at one point named Sneedsville. Other sources claim that the community was named Smeedsville rather than Sneedsville. One claim comes from a series of writings for the Dickson Free Press by former mayor Robert S. Clement From Mile Post 42… To City of Dickson 1980. In article 7 "Was it called Sneedsville or Smeedsville?" Clement writes about a 1867 Chancery Court decree that was brought to his attention by historian Henry Ragan that refers to the land as "Smeedsville, Dickson County, Tennessee.", and that Ragan interviewed various locals who remembered the town being named Smeedsville. Corlew claimed that he had found Chancery Court documents from the same year that incorporated the area as Sneedsville or Smeedsville, and that it's hard to interpret it being an "n" or an "m" due to the handwriting.

== Geography ==
Dickson is located in south-central Dickson County at 36°4′17″N 87°22′28″W (36.071485, -87.374539). It is bordered to the east by the town of Burns. U.S. Route 70 passes through the north side of the city as Henslee Drive; it leads east 40 miles (64 km) to Nashville and west 62 miles (100 km) to Huntingdon. Interstate 40 passes through the Dickson city limits 5 miles (8 km) south of the center of town, with access from Exit 172 (Tennessee State Route 46). I-40 leads east 37 miles (60 km) to Nashville from Exit 172 and west 92 miles (148 km) to Jackson.

According to the United States Census Bureau, Dickson has a total area of 20.0 square miles (51.9 km^{2}), of which 20.0 square miles (51.7 km^{2}) is land and 0.1 square miles (0.2 km^{2}), or 0.41%, is water. The city center sits on the Tennessee Valley Divide, with the southwest side of the city draining via the East Piney River to the Piney River, then to the Duck River, and then to the Tennessee River, while the northeast side drains via Turnbull Creek or Jones Creek to the Harpeth River and thence to the Cumberland River.

=== Climate ===
Climate data for Dickson, Tennessee (1991–2020 normals, extremes 1900–present)
Month	Jan	Feb	Mar	Apr	May	Jun	Jul	Aug	Sep	Oct	Nov	Dec	Year
Record high °F (°C)	80 (27)	82 (28)	93 (34)	95 (35)	98 (37)	109 (43)	110 (43)	110 (43)	108 (42)	95 (35)	88 (31)	78 (26)	110 (43)
Mean daily maximum °F (°C)	47.5 (8.6)	52.3 (11.3)	61.1 (16.2)	70.9 (21.6)	77.4 (25.2)	84.1 (28.9)	86.9 (30.5)	86.9 (30.5)	81.3 (27.4)	71.0 (21.7)	59.5 (15.3)	50.4 (10.2)	69.1 (20.6)
Daily mean °F (°C)	37.5 (3.1)	41.4 (5.2)	49.4 (9.7)	58.6 (14.8)	66.1 (18.9)	73.5 (23.1)	76.9 (24.9)	76.1 (24.5)	69.9 (21.1)	59.0 (15.0)	48.0 (8.9)	40.5 (4.7)	58.1 (14.5)
Mean daily minimum °F (°C)	27.5 (−2.5)	30.4 (−0.9)	37.7 (3.2)	46.2 (7.9)	54.9 (12.7)	62.9 (17.2)	66.8 (19.3)	65.4 (18.6)	58.5 (14.7)	46.9 (8.3)	36.5 (2.5)	30.6 (−0.8)	47.0 (8.3)
Record low °F (°C)	−23 (−31)	−14 (−26)	−1 (−18)	16 (−9)	29 (−2)	38 (3)	48 (9)	42 (6)	32 (0)	20 (−7)	−3 (−19)	−13 (−25)	−23 (−31)
Average precipitation inches (mm)	4.33 (110)	4.90 (124)	5.44 (138)	4.93 (125)	5.79 (147)	4.02 (102)	4.62 (117)	3.45 (88)	3.45 (88)	4.04 (103)	3.97 (101)	5.13 (130)	54.07 (1,373)
Average snowfall inches (cm)	0.8 (2.0)	0.6 (1.5)	0.5 (1.3)	0.0 (0.0)	0.0 (0.0)	0.0 (0.0)	0.0 (0.0)	0.0 (0.0)	0.0 (0.0)	0.0 (0.0)	0.0 (0.0)	0.6 (1.5)	2.5 (6.4)
Average precipitation days (≥ 0.01 in)	10.3	9.9	10.4	10.2	10.2	9.6	9.3	8.0	6.7	7.9	8.9	10.5	111.9
Average snowy days (≥ 0.1 in)	0.4	0.4	0.3	0.0	0.0	0.0	0.0	0.0	0.0	0.0	0.0	0.4	1.5
Source: NOAA

== Demographics ==
Historical population
Census	Pop.	Note	%±
1890	938		—
1900	1,363		45.3%
1910	1,850		35.7%
1920	2,263		22.3%
1930	2,902		28.2%
1940	3,504		20.7%
1950	3,348		−4.5%
1960	5,028		50.2%
1970	5,665		12.7%
1980	7,040		24.3%
1990	8,791		24.9%
2000	12,244		39.3%
2010	14,538		18.7%
2020	16,058		10.5%
2025 (est.)	17,051	▲	6.2%

As of the 2020 census, there was a population of 16,058, with 6,597 households and 3,690 families residing in the city.

=== Racial and ethnic composition ===
Racial composition as of the 2020 census
Race	Number	Percent
White	12,709	79.1%
Black or African American	1,240	7.7%
American Indian and Alaska Native	102	0.6%
Asian	170	1.1%
Two or more races	1,248	7.7%
Hispanic or Latino (of any race)	1,277	8.0%

=== 2020 census ===
The median age was 37.9 years, with 22.9% of residents under the age of 18 and 18.1% aged 65 or older; for every 100 females there were 87.2 males, and for every 100 females age 18 and over there were 83.5 males aged 18 and over.

89.6% of residents lived in urban areas, while 10.4% lived in rural areas.

Of the 6,597 households in Dickson, 30.7% had children under the age of 18 living in them; 37.2% were married-couple households, 19.0% were households with a male householder and no spouse or partner present, and 35.8% were households with a female householder and no spouse or partner present. About 32.7% of all households were made up of individuals and 14.3% had someone living alone who was 65 years of age or older.

There were 6,936 housing units, of which 4.9% were vacant. The homeowner vacancy rate was 1.5% and the rental vacancy rate was 2.4%.

=== 2000 census ===
As of the census of 2000, there was a population of 12,244, with 4,934 households and 3,300 families residing in the city. There were 24,325 people in the 37055 zip code. The population density was 743.4 inhabitants per square mile (287.0/km^{2}). There were 5,280 housing units at an average density of 320.6 per square mile (123.8/km^{2}). The racial makeup of the city was 87.86% White, 8.83% African American, 0.46% Native American, 0.56% Asian, 0.77% from other races, and 1.54% from two or more races. Hispanic or Latino of any race were 1.94% of the population.

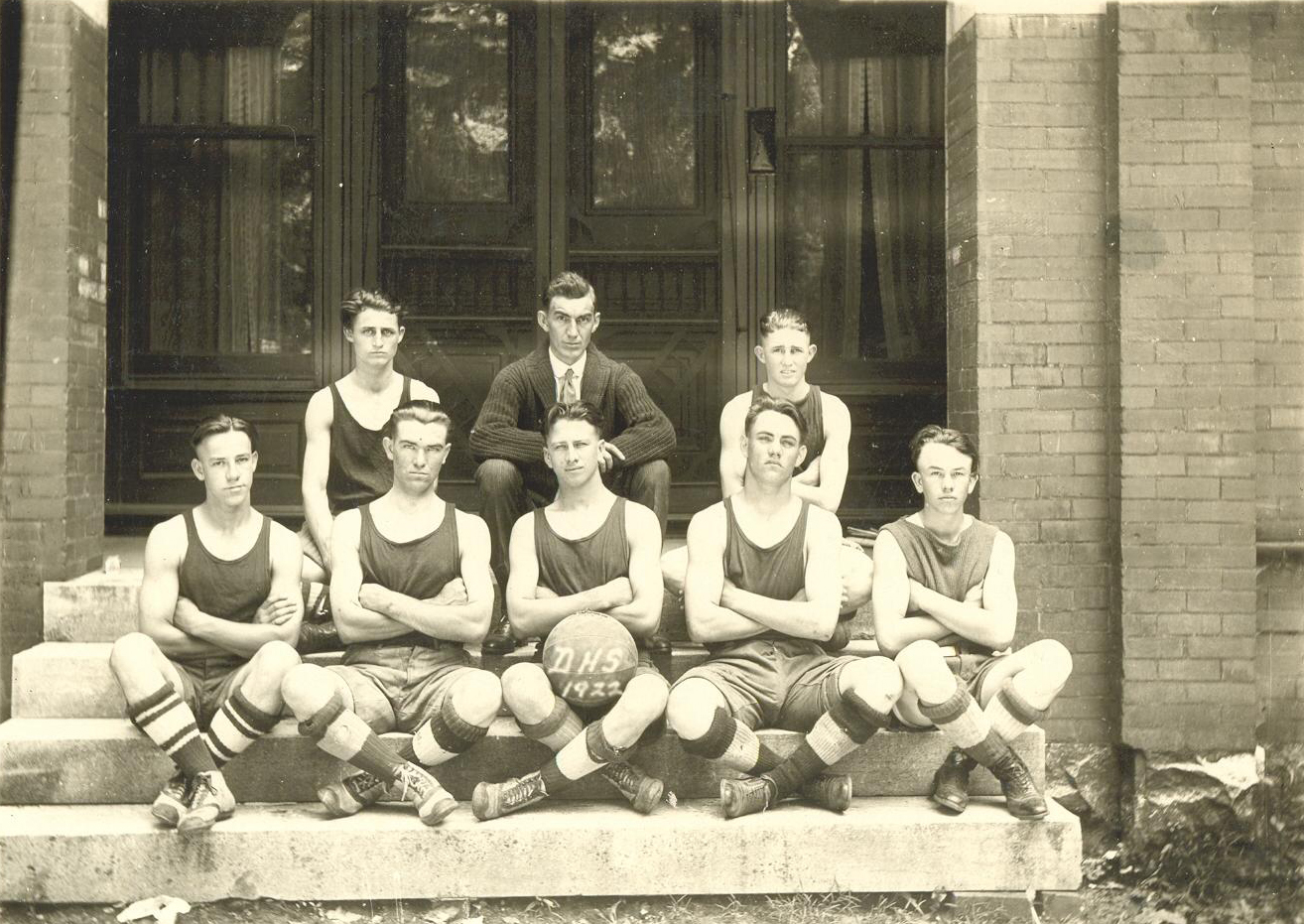
The 1922 Dickson County High School basketball team

There were 4,934 households, out of which 34.2% had children under the age of 18 living with them, 46.5% were married couples living together, 16.8% had a female householder with no husband present, and 33.1% were non-families. 29.1% of all households were made up of individuals, and 11.6% had someone living alone who was 65 years of age or older. The average household size was 2.42 and the average family size was 2.97.

In the city the population was spread out, with 27.2% under the age of 18, 9.0% from 18 to 24, 28.9% from 25 to 44, 20.6% from 45 to 64, and 14.4% who were 65 years of age or older. The median age was 35 years. For every 100 females, there were 86.7 males. For every 100 females age 18 and over, there were 79.8 males.

The median income for a household in the city was $34,549, and the median income for a family was $42,632. Males had a median income of $32,733 versus $23,138 for females. The per capita income for the city was $17,654. About 12.6% of families and 15.3% of the population were below the poverty line, including 19.3% of those under age 18 and 14.2% of those age 65 or over.

== Government ==
=== Mayor ===
The City of Dickson is governed by a mayor and City Council. Mayor Don Weiss, Jr., has served in office since 1993, making him the longest-serving mayor of Dickson.

=== City Council ===
The City of Dickson is divided into four wards, each of which elects two members to the City Council. Councillors are elected to staggered four-year terms, with one Councillor from each ward being elected every two years.

=== City Administrator ===
As the Mayor of Dickson is only a part-time job, a City Administrator is also appointed to oversee the day-to-day operations of the city government and its budget.

=== Parks and Recreation ===
The City of Dickson Parks and Recreation Department maintains and operates various green spaces in Dickson, including sports areas, playgrounds, lake areas, and community centers.

== Media ==
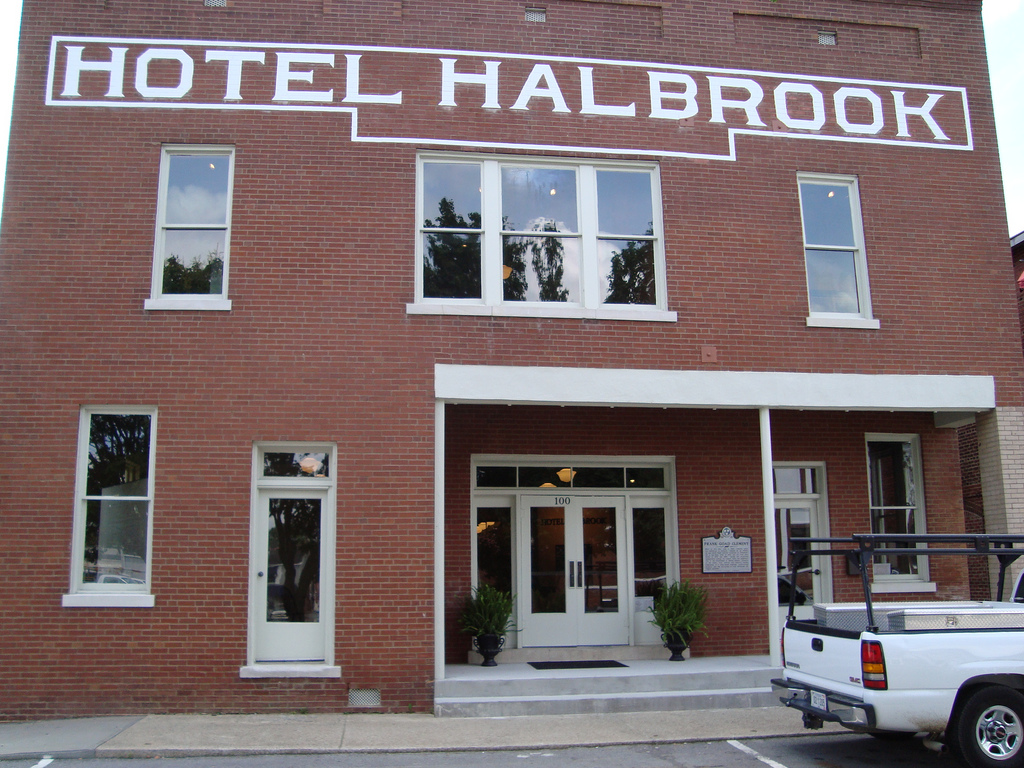
The Hotel Halbrook Railroad & Local History Museum was placed on the National Register of Historic Places in 1990.

=== Television ===
- WDHC-LD Channel 6 (The Family Channel)

=== Radio ===
==== AM ====
- WDKN 1260 AM, Country, Gospel, Talk

==== FM ====
- WLTD-LP 103.9 FM 3ABN Radio, Religious
- WNRZ 91.5 FM Bott Radio Network

== Notable people ==
- Frank G. Clement, Governor of Tennessee
- Francis Craig, songwriter, bandleader
- Trevor Daniel, American Football punter for the Tennessee Titans of the National Football League
- Walter S. Davis, educator.
- John Mitchell, baseball player
- Craig Morgan, country singer
- Anson Mount, actor
- Sunita Mani, Indian-American actress
- Anthony Wayne Van Leer, entrepreneur

== See also ==
- List of cities in Tennessee
