= KJCV =

KJCV may refer to:

- KJCV (AM), a radio station (1450 AM) licensed to Jackson, Wyoming, United States
- KJCV-FM, a radio station (89.7 FM) licensed to Country Club, Missouri, United States
