= 50 Penn Place =

Mixed-use complex in Oklahoma City, Oklahoma

- Location: Oklahoma City, Oklahoma USA
- Opened: 1973
- Owner: In-Rel Properties
- Floor area: 185,000-square-foot (17,200 m^{2})
- Floors: 16
- Website: in-rel.com/listings/50-penn-place/

50 Penn Place is an upscale mixed-use complex in the inner Northwest part of Oklahoma City, Oklahoma. The galleria-style shopping mall and tower is located at 1900 Northwest Expressway in the Penn Square trade area immediately at Interstate 44 and Northwest Expressway, across from Penn Square Mall near the exclusive suburb of Nichols Hills.

The complex consists of a 16-story office tower, upscale retail shops on three levels 185,000-square-foot (17,200 m^{2}), and a parking structure.

Midland Oak Realty purchased the building from MBL Life Assurance for $15 million in 1997. The complex was later owned by a Dallas-based capital management company, which bought the building for $25.7 million in 2004, along with 25 tenants-in-common. A planned sale fell through in 2008. In March 2011, In-Rel Properties based in Lake Worth, Florida, purchased the building for $15.25 million and invested over $1 million in renovations.

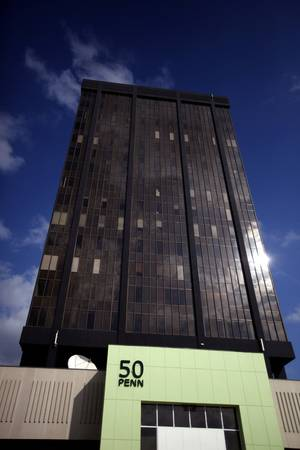
50 Penn Place is pictured in Oklahoma City, Thursday, March 15, 2012. Photo by Sarah Phipps, The Oklahoman.

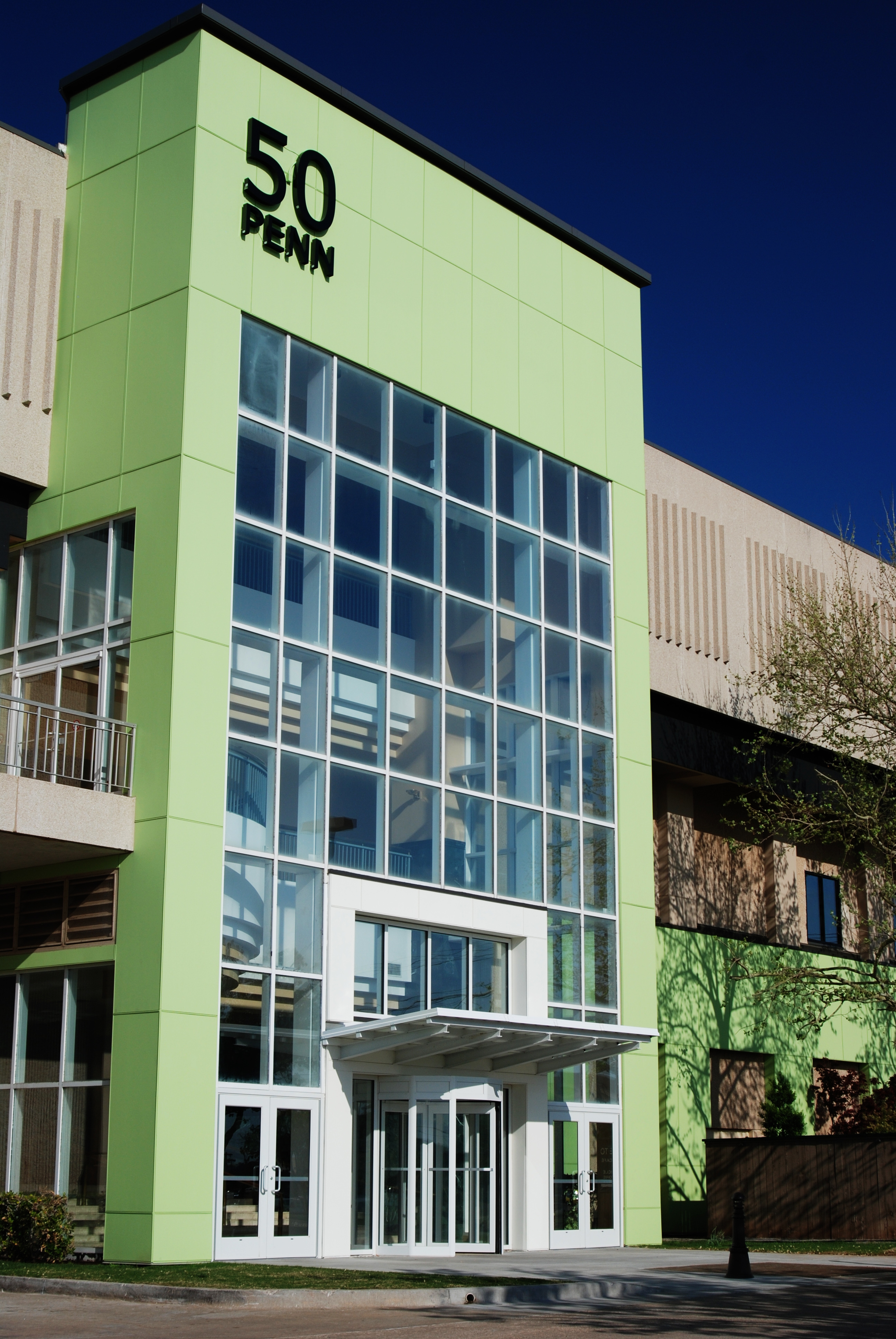
The ground floor entrance to the retail portion of the mall.

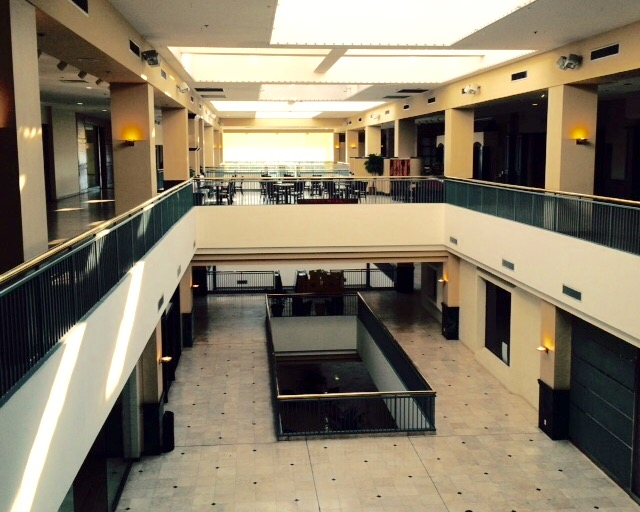
Another interior shot of the mall.

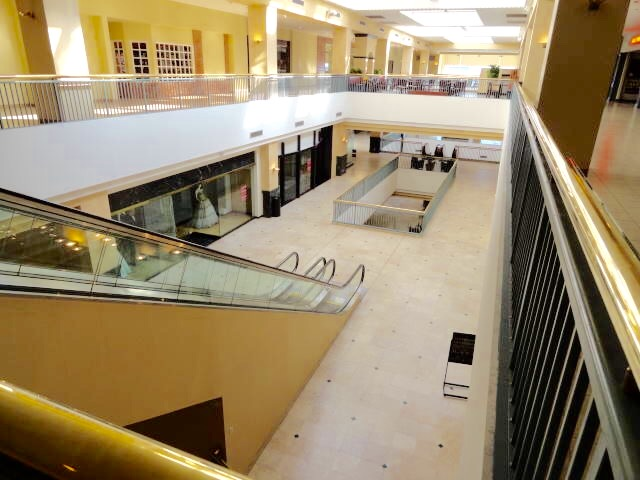
The interior of the mall.

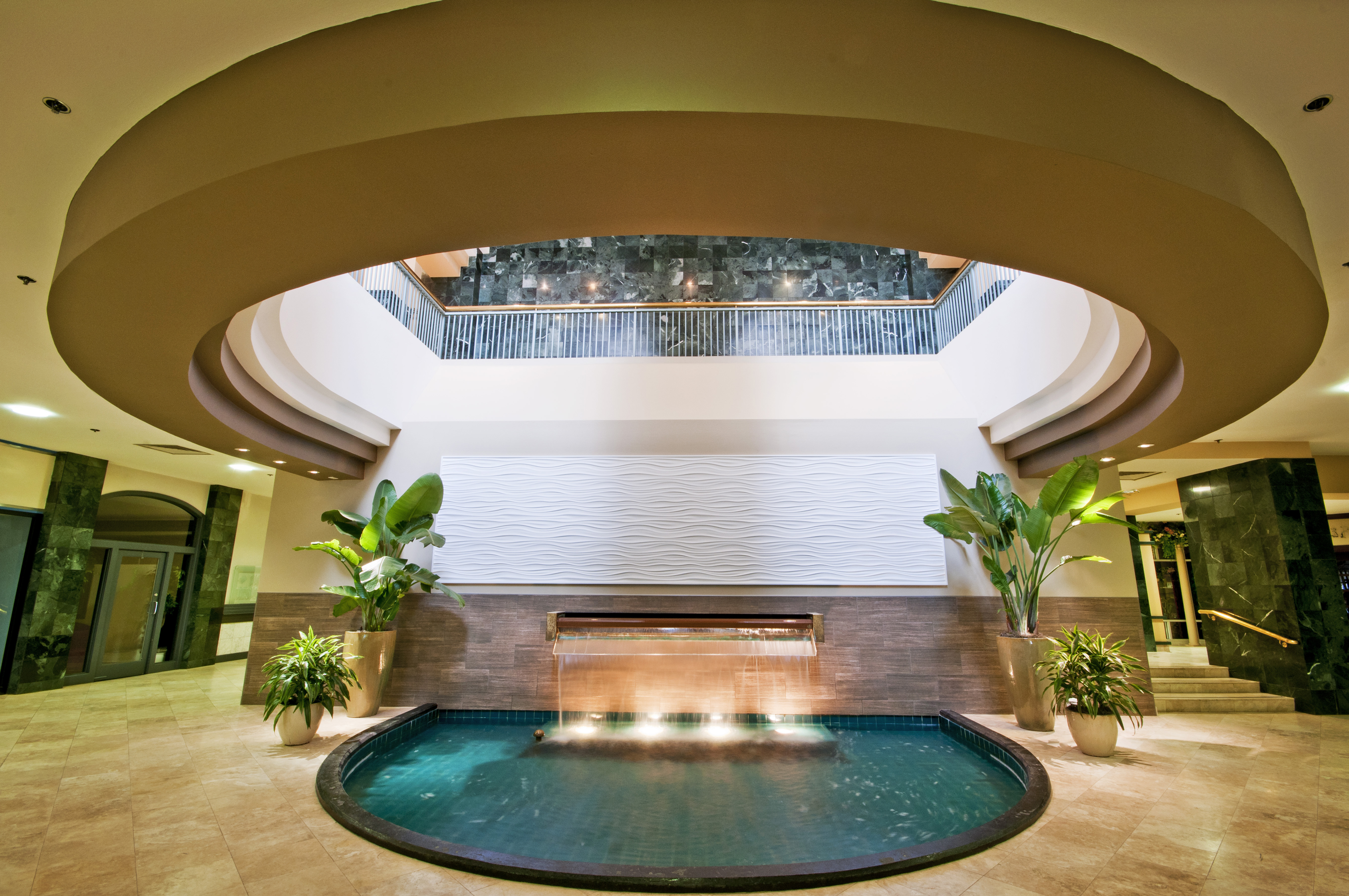
The fountain inside the office tower of 50 Penn Place, Oklahoma City, OK.

== History ==
The complex was built in 1973 by C.W. Cameron, founder of American Fidelity. For the next twenty years it was a landmark due to four red piggy bank signs (One on all four sides of the Elevator tower on top of the building.) with a big "S" in the center, belonging to Sooner Federal Savings and Loan who had their home offices in the Building at the time. It was also formerly home to a couple of Oklahoma locally owned chain of high end retail stores such as Balliets a women's boutique and the flagship store of Orbach's which closed in 1990. Although not currently anchored by a major retailer, 50 Penn Place still has upscale shops and restaurants, a brewpub, independent bookstore, the 50 Penn Place Art Gallery, and various office tenants including LexisNexis. In recent years, the retail portion of the complex has lost the majority of its tenants to other nearby shopping venues, such as Penn Square Mall right across the street, and Classen Curve a newly built modern upscale shopping center in Nichols Hills. Because of this, 50 Penn Place is no longer seen by locals as an upscale shopping destination. However, several upscale tenants still remain, and former retail space is being leased to other tenants, such as ITT Technical Institute. In March 2011, In-Rel Properties purchased the building for $15.25 million and invested over $1 million in renovations.

On October 11, 2023, the building suffered a fire.

== Tenants ==
- 50 Penn Place Gallery
- Belle Isle Brewery Company
- Branch Communications
- Capital Insurance Group
- Craig E. Brown, PC
- Full Circle Bookstore & Cafe
- Futurity First Insurance Group
- iHeartCommunications, Inc.
  - Radio Stations:
    - KOKQ (94.7) - Classic Rock (Q94.7)
    - KGHM-AM (1340) - Sports/Sports talk (Fox Sports Radio)
    - KJYO-FM (102.7) - Top 40 Rock (Also known as KJ-103)
    - KTOK-AM (1000) - News Radio 1000 KTOK (News/Talk)
    - KTST-FM (101.9) - The Newest Country Hits (101-9 The Twister)
    - KXXY-FM (96.1) - Classic Country (96.1 KXY)
    - 98.5 El Patron (98.5) KOKQ HD2 - Regional Mexican (98.5 El Patron)
- ITT Technical Institute
- Inceed Employment Professionals
- Jameson Management
- Legacy Investment Services
- LexisNexis Risk Solutions
- Mahin's Full Service Salon
- Mee Mee Hoge & Epperson, PLLP
- Midwest Private Client Group
- Oklahoma City Abstract & Title Company
- Pinpoint Resource Fine Wear
- Regent Bank
- Route 66 Gift Shop
- Summit Group
- Wilsey Meyer Eatmon Tate, PLLC
- Olive Garden Italian Kitchen (separate building on the premises)

== See also ==
- List of tallest buildings in Oklahoma City
