= KXY =

KXY may refer to:

- Kyle XY, an American television drama series about a boy named Kyle, who has no memory of his life up until that point
- KXXY-FM, a radio station licensed to Oklahoma City, Oklahoma, United States
