= KTST =

Radio station in Oklahoma City

Coordinates: 35.597833°N 97.48975°W

- Oklahoma City, Oklahoma; United States
- Broadcast area: Oklahoma City metropolitan area
- Frequency: 101.9 MHz (HD Radio)
- Branding: 101.9 The Twister

Programming
- Format: Country
- Subchannels: HD1: KTST analog HD2: Contemporary Christian (KJTH)
- Affiliations: Premiere Networks

Ownership
- Owner: iHeartMedia, Inc.; (iHM Licenses, LLC)
- Sister stations: KGHM, KJYO, KOKQ, KTOK, KXXY-FM

History
- First air date: 1962 (as KFNB)
- Former call signs: KFNB (1962–1979); KLTE (1979–1991); KOQL (1991–1994)
- Call sign meaning: "Twister"

Technical information
- Licensing authority: FCC
- Facility ID: 58390
- Class: C0
- ERP: 100,000 watts
- HAAT: 372 meters (1,220 ft)
- Translator: HD2: 100.1 K261DP (Edmond)

Links
- Public license information: Public file; LMS
- Webcast: Listen Live
- Website: thetwister.iheart.com

KTST (101.9 FM, "101.9 The Twister") is a country music station serving the Oklahoma City area and is owned by iHeartMedia, Inc. Its transmitter is located in Northeast Oklahoma City, Oklahoma, and the studios and offices were located in the 50 Penn Place building on the Northwest side, in early 2022 iHeartMedia Oklahoma City moved KTST-FM along with sister stations KGHM, KTOK, KJYO, KXXY-FM, KREF-FM, to new state of the art studios located at 6525 N Meridian Ave further up the road on the Northwest side just a few miles west from their former studio home in the 50 Penn Place building.

== History ==
The station went on the air with a MOR format as KFNB (K First National Bank) transmitting from their bank building top downtown in 1962. The station switched calls to KLTE and became adult contemporary "Lite Rock 102" in 1979. Although it was, for a time, the only AC station in OKC, Lite Rock 102 struggled to catch on. After KOFM 104.1 shocked the market and abandoned its successful CHR format for AC as Magic 104, Lite Rock 102 would usually be the lowest rated Class C FM in the market. Lite Rock 102 tried several different experiments to boost ratings, including jazz in the afterhours and oldies on the weekends, but none brought it much success.

The station switched formats to oldies and became "K-Lite 102" in August 1989. On January 2, 1991, at 9:00 p.m., during Jamie Lee's airshift, the station announced it was changing call letters to KOQL and would become known as "Kool 102". The oldies format was fairly successful, but Entercom announced just before Thanksgiving 1993 that KOQL would be the first station it would sell in roughly 20 years. Newmarket Communications, owner of country KXXY 1340/96.1, would purchase the station and begin operating it immediately in an LMA. The future was easy to predict as Newmarket had just acquired a second station with the same format in New Orleans to pair with its country WNOE 101.1 and flipped it to a second country station. By Christmas 1993, KOQL would be the home of "Non-stop, full tilt rockin' country," 101.9 The Twister. The call letters changed to KTST on March 11, 1994 when the FCC approved of the license transfer from Entercom to Newmarket.

Newmarket announced it would be selling to Radio Equity Partners shortly after taking over The Twister, and Radio Equity Partners became one of the first major Clear Channel acquisitions after the Telecommunications Act of 1996 passed. The result was a bigger cluster at 50 Penn Place, including KTOK 1000, KXXY 1340/96.1, KJYO 102.7, KEBC 94.7 and KTST 101.9. For a brief time, Clear Channel also operated Gaylord's WKY 930 alongside its OKC cluster.

KTST, along with the other iHeart stations in Oklahoma City, simulcasts audio of KFOR-TV if a tornado warning is issued within the Oklahoma City metro area.

== Weekday On-Air Lineup ==
- The Bobby Bones Show 5a-10a
- JJ Ryan 10a-12p
- Billy Greenwood 12p-3p
- Otis 3p-7p
- Wayne & Tay 7p-12a
