= Oklahoma City Comets =

Minor League Baseball team

- Founded in 1962; Oklahoma City, Oklahoma
Team logo
Cap insignia

Minor league affiliations
- Class: Triple-A (1962–present)
- League: Pacific Coast League (1998–present)
- Division: East Division
- Previous leagues: American Association (1969–1997); Pacific Coast League (1963–1968); American Association (1962)

Major league affiliations
- Team: Los Angeles Dodgers (2015–present)
- Previous teams: Houston Astros (2011–2014); Texas Rangers (1983–2010); Philadelphia Phillies (1976–1982); Cleveland Indians (1973–1975); Houston Colt .45s/Astros (1962–1972)

Minor league titles
- Class titles (1): 2026
- League titles (6): 1963; 1965; 1992; 1996; 2023; 2026
- Conference titles (3): 1999; 2008; 2016
- Division titles (15): 1963; 1965; 1979; 1985; 1992; 1999; 2002; 2004; 2005; 2008; 2010; 2013; 2015; 2016; 2018
- First-half titles (1): 2023
- Second-half titles (1): 2026

Team data
- Name: Oklahoma City Comets (2025–present)
- Previous names: Oklahoma City Baseball Club (2024); Oklahoma City Dodgers (2015–2023); Oklahoma City RedHawks (2009–2014); Oklahoma RedHawks (1998–2008); Oklahoma City 89ers (1962–1997)
- Colors: Dodger blue, light blue, red, white
- Mascots: Moonshot and Rover
- Ballpark: Chickasaw Bricktown Ballpark (1998–present)
- Previous parks: All Sports Stadium (1962–1997)
- Owner/ Operator: Diamond Baseball Holdings
- President: Kyle Daugherty
- General manager: Kyle Daugherty
- Manager: Scott Hennessey
- Website: milb.com/oklahoma-city

The Oklahoma City Comets are a Minor League Baseball team of the Pacific Coast League (PCL) and the Triple-A affiliate of the Los Angeles Dodgers. They are located in Oklahoma City, Oklahoma, and play their home games at Chickasaw Bricktown Ballpark, which opened in 1998 in the city's Bricktown district.

The team was originally known as the Oklahoma City 89ers from 1962 to 1997 and played at All Sports Stadium. The 89ers competed in the Triple-A American Association (AA) in 1962, moved to the Pacific Coast League from 1963 to 1968, and returned to the AA from 1969 to 1997. After the American Association disbanded, the 89ers rejoined the PCL in 1998 and have been members of it since, including the 2021 season when it was known as the Triple-A West. The team renamed itself the Oklahoma RedHawks from 1998 to 2008 and the Oklahoma City RedHawks from 2009 to 2014. The franchise affiliated with the Los Angeles Dodgers in 2015 and changed its name to the Oklahoma City Dodgers. The team was temporarily called the Oklahoma City Baseball Club for the 2024 season before becoming the Comets in 2025.

Oklahoma City has won six league championships. The 89ers won the PCL championship in 1963 and 1965 as the Triple-A affiliate of the Houston Colt .45s/Astros. They later won the American Association championship in 1992 and 1996 with the Texas Rangers. Oklahoma City won their third PCL championship in 2023 and their fourth in 2026, both as affiliates of the Los Angeles Dodgers. The Comets won the Triple-A National Championship Game in 2026.

== History ==
=== Oklahoma City Mets and Indians (1904–1957) ===
Oklahoma City has been home to professional baseball for all but a few years since 1904, when the Metropolitans (Mets) were established as the city's first team. Oklahoma City's teams and names have changed numerous times since. The team became known as the Indians in 1909 before returning to the original Mets name in 1910 and reverting again to the Indians name in 1911. Oklahoma City was home to the Senators in 1912. After one year without a baseball team, Oklahoma City's squad became the Boosters in 1914. The Senators name returned from 1915 to 1916, but the Boosters name came back in 1917. The Oklahoma City Indians name returned in 1918 and the team name stuck until 1957 (the team did not compete during World War II).

=== Oklahoma City 89ers (1962–1997) ===
Oklahoma City's current baseball franchise began competing in 1962 as the Oklahoma City 89ers following a four-year period without professional baseball in the area. The franchise's original name made reference to the Land Run of 1889, which led to the founding of Oklahoma City.

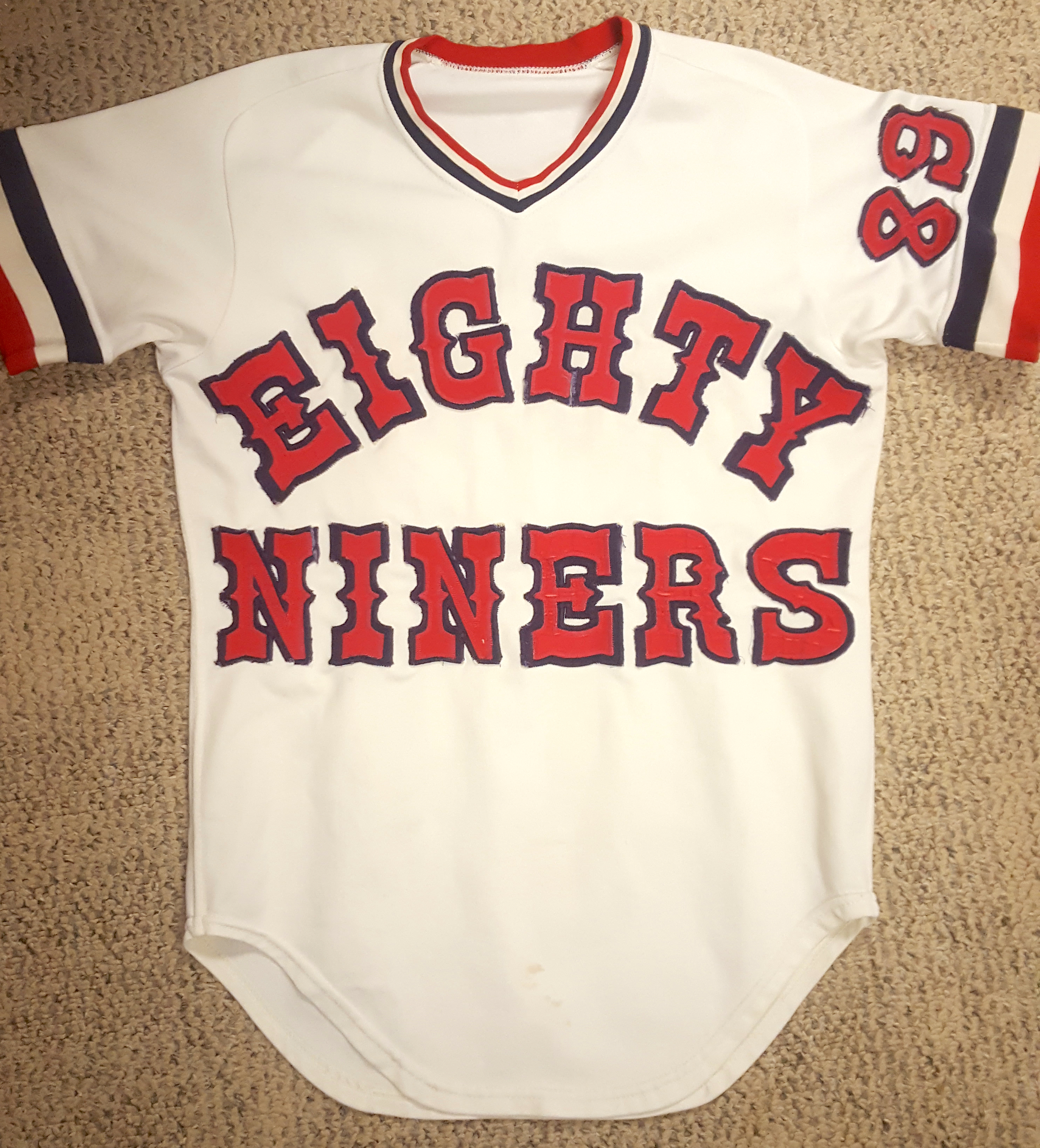
1975 Oklahoma City 89ers game worn home jersey

After the Houston Buffaloes of the American Association were purchased for territorial rights by the Houston Colt .45s (later the Houston Astros) of the National League, the big league club decided to move the Buffs elsewhere. In July 1961, Spec Richardson, who was then general manager of the Buffs, met with Oklahoma City officials and boosters, and agreed to move the team. After a unanimous approval from the American Association's board of directors, the current franchise began play in 1962 as the top affiliate of the Houston Colt .45s. The 89ers moved to the Pacific Coast League after the AA went on hiatus in 1963, and won the PCL championship in 1963 and 1965. They returned to the AA in 1969.

The Astros divested the team to Tulsa businessman, P. C. Dixon, in November 1970. The franchise affiliated with Cleveland from 1973 and 1975 and with the Philadelphia Phillies from 1976 until 1982.

The Texas Rangers became the parent club in 1983. The 89ers won the American Association championship in 1992 and 1996 as top affiliate of the Rangers.

=== Oklahoma and Oklahoma City RedHawks (1998–2014) ===
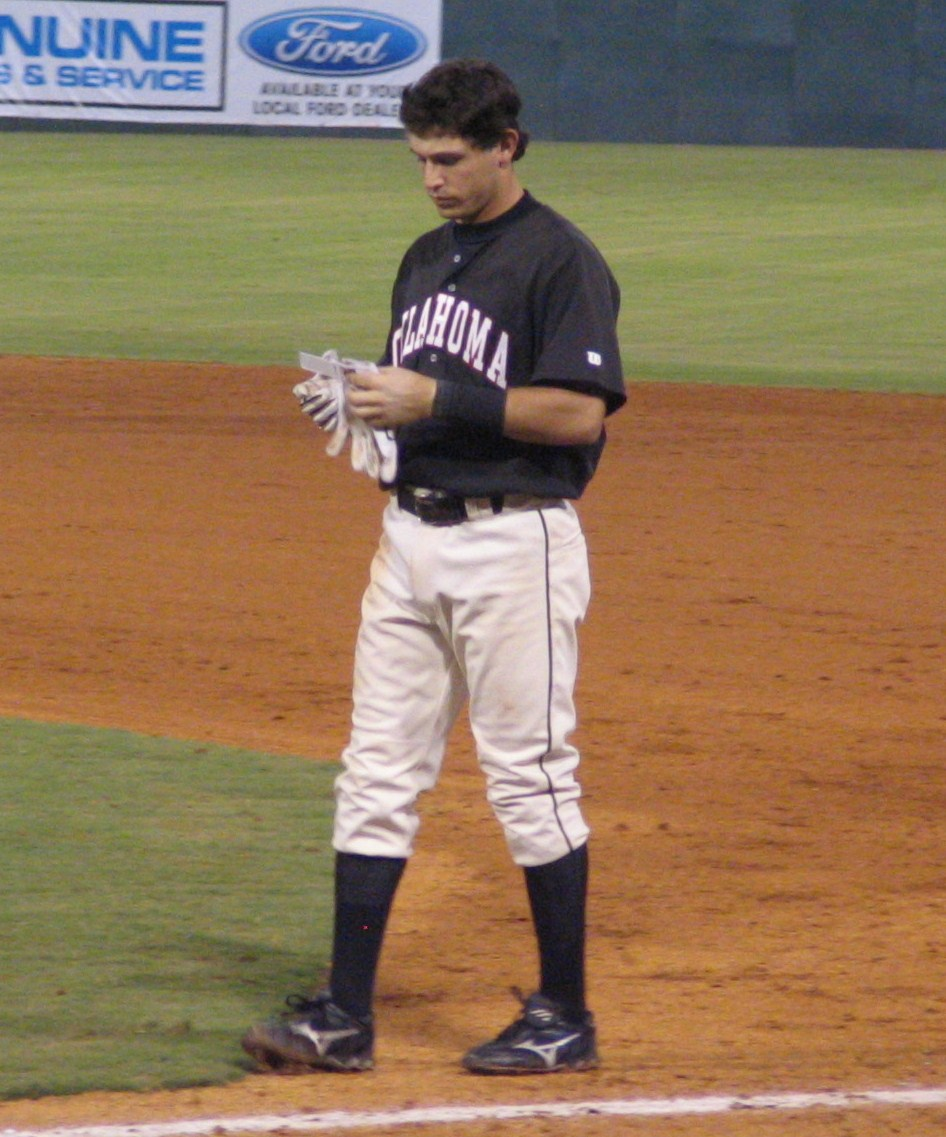
Ian Kinsler with the Redhawks in 2005

The franchise moved to the new Chickasaw Bricktown Ballpark in 1998. In the same year, they returned to the PCL after the AA dissolved, and changed their name to the Oklahoma RedHawks. The team was renamed the RedHawks after the red-tailed hawk, a bird of prey commonly seen throughout Oklahoma. When announcing the new name, team officials noted the raptor's four-foot wingspan and migration patterns that always return the bird to Oklahoma. They also noted that the state song mentions a hawk.

Pitcher Dustin Nippert recorded the first RedHawks no-hitter on June 29, 2008, against the Omaha Royals at Johnny Rosenblatt Stadium in Omaha, Nebraska. The Redhawks won the seven-inning game, the first of a doubleheader, 2–0. Nippert walked two batters and struck out five in the first Oklahoma City professional baseball no-hitter since August 13, 1996, when Rick Helling recorded a perfect game for the 89ers.

Oklahoma City RedHawks logo (2009–2014)

Before the 2009 season, the team added "City" to its name to honor residents who paid for the ballpark through a temporary one-cent sales tax to fund the Metropolitan Area Projects Plan, or MAPS. The renamed Oklahoma City RedHawks also introduced new logos and a new color scheme.

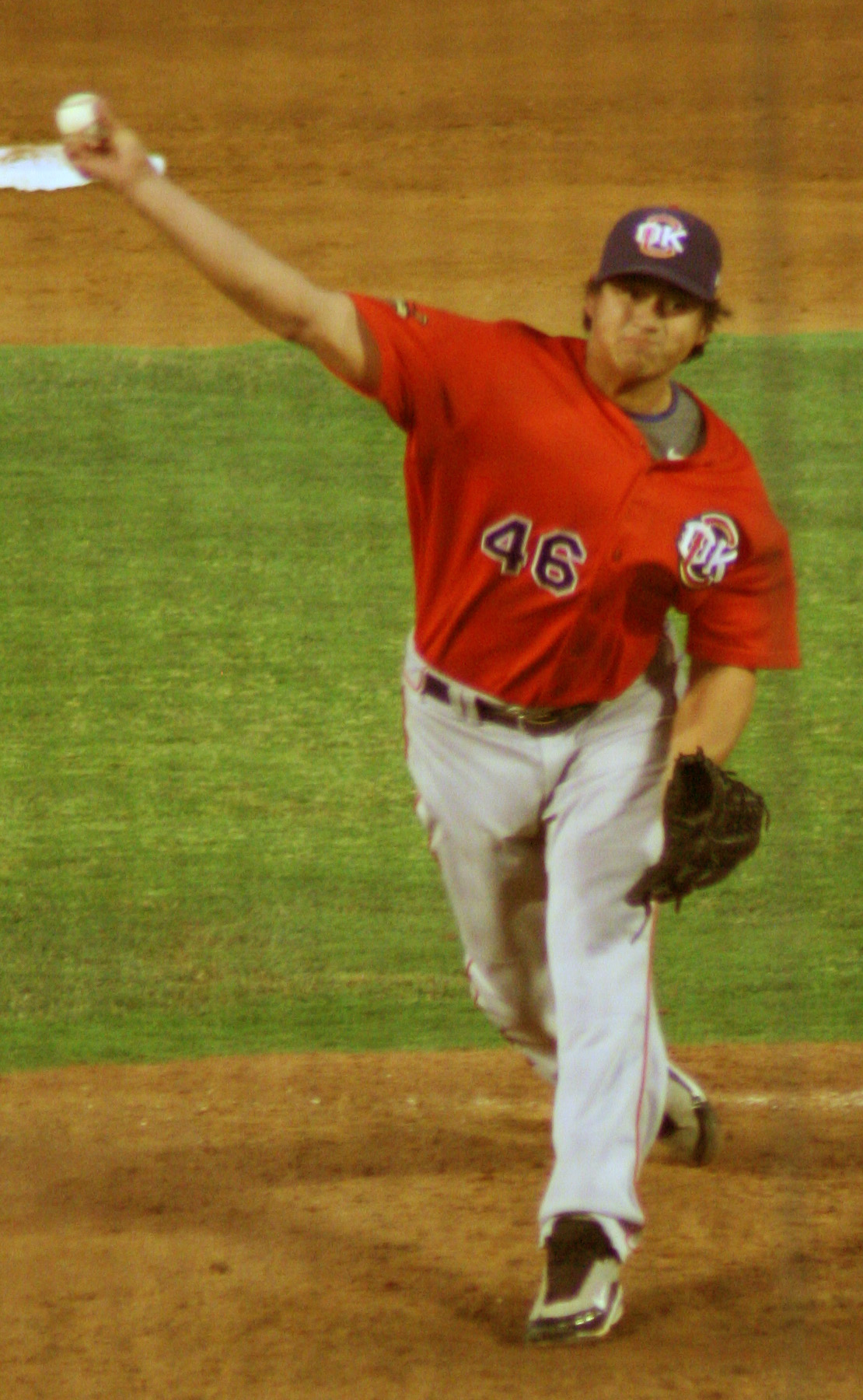
Luis Mendoza pitched a no-hitter for the RedHawks on August 14, 2009.

Pitcher Luis Mendoza pitched the team's first nine-inning no-hitter on August 14, 2009, against the Salt Lake Bees at Bricktown Ballpark. He threw 125 pitches, including 74 for strikes. He walked six and struck out six batters in the 5–0 win.

Six players have hit three home runs in a single game. Adrián González became the first to accomplish the offensive feat on May 24, 2005, at Albuquerque. He went 3-for-4 with five RBI. All three of Nelson Cruz's hits on July 19, 2008, against Memphis were home runs. He went 3-for-5 with five RBI in the game. Nate Gold went 4-for-5 with three homers and four RBI on July 28, 2008, at Colorado Springs. Chad Tracy hit three homers on June 27, 2010, against Omaha, finishing the game 3-for-3 with five RBI. Mike Hessman went 4-for-4 with three homers on June 3, 2012, against Iowa. Matt Duffy went 3-for-4 with three homers and three RBI on June 9, 2014, against Salt Lake.

Gregorio Petit is the lone OKC player to record two grand slams in one game, accomplishing the feat on June 22, 2010, at New Orleans.

On September 14, 2010, the Texas Rangers' owners announced that they were moving their Triple-A affiliation to the Round Rock Express (formerly the Astros' Triple-A affiliate). On September 15, the RedHawks were sold to Mandalay Baseball Properties, which also owned or operated four other Minor League Baseball teams, and is part of the Mandalay Entertainment conglomerate chaired by entertainment industry executive Peter Guber. On September 20, Mandalay agreed to make the RedHawks the Astros' new Triple-A affiliate.

In 2011, Anderson Hernandez put together the longest hitting streak in team history: 30 gamed from August 2 to September 2.

The 2013 Redhawks made numerous entries into the club's record book. The RedHawks set the team record for most runs scored in a game at Chickasaw Bricktown Ballpark and tied the club record for most runs scored in a game overall in a 24–5 win against Colorado Springs on August 3, 2013.

The 2013 squad also compiled the longest overall and home winning streaks in club history. The RedHawks won 12 straight games overall from July 26 to August 6. They continued winning at home, stringing together 17 consecutive wins at Chickasaw Bricktown Ballpark from July 26 to August 20.

=== Oklahoma City Dodgers (2015–2023) ===
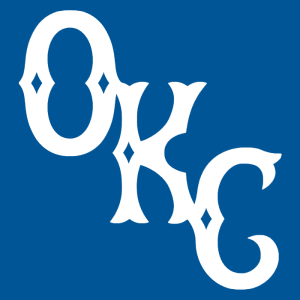
Oklahoma City Dodgers logo (2015–2023)

After the 2014 season, the RedHawks announced the sale of the franchise to a partnership between Mandalay Entertainment Chairman and CEO Peter Guber, other current principals of Mandalay Baseball Properties, Jason Sugarman, and the Los Angeles Dodgers. As a result of the purchase agreement, the RedHawks became the Triple-A affiliate of the Dodgers in 2015 and were renamed after their parent club, becoming the Oklahoma City Dodgers.

The 2015 OKC Dodgers set a new modern-era mark for wins, finishing the regular season with the best record in the PCL at 86-58 and going on to win the American Northern Division title. The last OKC team to win at least 86 games was the 1965 Oklahoma City 89ers (91–54). The 2015 team also set single-season team records for road wins (44), fewest runs allowed (608), and fewest home runs allowed (89). The team stood 30 games above .500 (85–55) during the season, the first time the team reached that mark in its modern PCL history. OKC Dodgers manager Damon Berryhill was named 2015 PCL Manager of the Year, becoming the first OKC manager to win the honor since Greg Biagini in 1999.

Corey Seager became the second OKC player in the PCL era to record six hits in a game when he went 6-for-6 at Salt Lake City on May 28, 2015, including a home run and two doubles. Seager collected six RBI and scored two runs. Jeff Pickler was the first OKC player in the modern era to accomplish the feat June 22, 2004, at Albuquerque, going 6-for-6 with a double, triple, and RBI.

The 2016 OKC Dodgers claimed a second straight 80-win regular season and picked up back-to-back PCL American Northern Division championships. They advanced to the PCL Championship Series for the first time since 2008.

The 2016 Dodgers posted a 3.72 team ERA to establish a new club record during the PCL era and the OKC pitching staff racked up a league-leading 1,245 strikeouts to set the PCL modern era record for strikeouts in just 141 games. The Dodgers allowed a league-low 372 walks, also the fewest allowed by an OKC team during the PCL era. Pitcher Jose De Leon became the first OKC pitcher to record five double-digit strikeout games in one season.

The record-breaking continued for the OKC Dodgers in 2017. The team broke its own record for strikeouts as Dodgers pitchers combined for 1,277 strikeouts during the season.

Right-handed starting pitcher Wilmer Font led the charge and paced all of Triple-A baseball with 178 strikeouts and set OKC's all-time single-season strikeout record (since 1998). He tied former Dodger Jose De Leon's club record by compiling five games with at least 10 strikeouts. Font racked up a team-record 15 strikeouts on May 15 against Sacramento at Chickasaw Bricktown Ballpark and went on to be named the PCL Pitcher of the Year.

The Dodgers recorded back-to-back-to-back home runs for the first time in modern team history (since 1998) June 9, 2017, against Round Rock in Oklahoma City. With one out in the first inning, Joc Pederson, Scott Van Slyke, and Willie Calhoun each homered within a span of five pitches.

The third-largest crowd in Chickasaw Bricktown Ballpark history was on hand to watch a rehab appearance by Los Angeles Dodgers pitcher Clayton Kershaw August 26, 2017, against the Omaha Storm Chasers. A standing-room-only crowd of 13,106 was the largest in OKC since April 18, 1998 – the third game ever played at Chickasaw Bricktown Ballpark.

The start of the 2020 season was postponed due to the COVID-19 pandemic before ultimately being canceled on June 30. In conjunction with Major League Baseball's restructuring of Minor League Baseball in 2021, the Dodgers were organized into the Triple-A West. Oklahoma City ended the season tied for second place in the Eastern Division with a 61–58 record. No playoffs were held to determine a league champion; instead, the team with the best regular-season record was declared the winner. However, 10 games that had been postponed from the start of the season were reinserted into the schedule as a postseason tournament called the Triple-A Final Stretch in which all 30 Triple-A clubs competed for the highest winning percentage. Oklahoma City finished the tournament tied for seventh place with a 6–4 record.

On December 14, 2021, the Oklahoma City Dodgers were purchased by Diamond Baseball Holdings, a subsidiary of Endeavor Group Holdings, Inc., with the Los Angeles Dodgers remaining a parent club affiliate. In 2022, the Triple-A West became known as the Pacific Coast League, the name historically used by the regional circuit prior to the 2021 reorganization.

Playing under a split-season format in 2023 in which the teams with the best league-wide records at the end of each half qualified for the playoffs, Oklahoma City won the first-half title at 50–23. They tied for fifth place in the second half with a record of 40–35. Overall, the team posted the league's best record, 90–58. In a single round of playoffs versus the Round Rock Express, winners of the second half, the Dodgers won their third PCL championship, two games to none. They lost the Triple-A National Championship Game to the Norfolk Tides, champions of the International League, 7–6.

=== Oklahoma City Baseball Club (2024) ===
Oklahoma City Baseball Club logo (2024)

After the 2023 season, the team name was changed to the Oklahoma City Baseball Club while options were explored for a new, unique, and locally oriented name that would differentiate the team from the MLB Dodgers (which remained the parent organization). The club operated under this temporary name until a new identity was announced following the 2024 season.

=== Oklahoma City Comets (2025–present) ===
After the 2024 season, the team changed its name to the Oklahoma City Comets, an homage to Oklahoma native Mickey Mantle's nickname, "the Commerce Comet", and to honor the city's ties to the aerospace industry.

The 2026 Comets won the second-half title with a 48–27 record. Overall, they posted a league-best 89–60 mark. They defeated the first-half champion Las Vegas Aviators, 2–1, in a best-of-three series to win their fourth PCL championship. Oklahoma City then beat the IL-champion Rochester Red Wings, 5–3 in 10 innings, to win the Triple-A National Championship Game.

== Season-by-season records ==
Table key
League	The team's final position in the league standings
Division	The team's final position in the divisional standings
GB	Games behind the team that finished in first place in the division that season
‡	Class champions (1962–present)
†	League champions (1962–present)
§	Conference champions (1998–2020)
*	Division champions (1963–2022)
^	Postseason berth (1962–present)

Season-by-season records
Season	League	Regular-season					Postseason			MLB affiliate	Ref.
Season	League	Record	Win %	League	Division	GB	Record	Win %	Result	MLB affiliate	Ref.
1962	AA	66–81	.449	5th	—	23	—	—	Result	—	Houston Colt .45s
1963 * †	PCL	84–74	.532	2nd	1st	—	4–3	.571	Won Southern Division title Won PCL championship vs. Spokane Indians, 4–3	Houston Colt .45s	
1964	PCL	88–70	.557	5th	3rd	8	—	—	—	Houston Colt .45s	
1965 * †	PCL	91–54	.628	1st	1st	—	4–1	.800	Won Eastern Division title Won PCL championship vs. Portland Beavers, 4–1	Houston Astros	
1966	PCL	59–89	.399	12th	6th	26 1/2	—	—	—	Houston Astros	
1967	PCL	74–74	.500	7th	4th	11	—	—	—	Houston Astros	
1968	PCL	61–84	.421	11th	6th	32 1/2	—	—	—	Houston Astros	
1969	AA	62–78	.443	4th (tie)	—	23	—	—	—	Houston Astros	
1970	AA	68–71	.489	6th	3rd	2	—	—	—	Houston Astros	
1971	AA	71–69	.507	3rd (tie)	2nd	2	—	—	—	Houston Astros	
1972	AA	57–83	.407	8th	4th	30	—	—	—	Houston Astros	
1973	AA	61–74	.452	7th	3rd	7	—	—	—	Cleveland Indians	
1974	AA	62–73	.459	6th	3rd	14 1/2	—	—	—	Cleveland Indians	
1975	AA	50–86	.368	8th	4th	31	—	—	—	Cleveland Indians	
1976	AA	72–63	.533	3rd	2nd	13 1/2	—	—	—	Philadelphia Phillies	
1977	AA	70–66	.515	4th (tie)	2nd (tie)	1	—	—	—	Philadelphia Phillies	
1978	AA	62–74	.456	7th	3rd	4 1/2	—	—	—	Philadelphia Phillies	
1979 *	AA	72–63	.533	3rd	1st	—	2–4	.333	Won Western Division title Lost AA championship vs. Evansville Triplets, 4–2	Philadelphia Phillies	
1980	AA	70–65	.519	3rd	2nd	21 1/2	—	—	—	Philadelphia Phillies	
1981	AA	69–67	.507	4th	3rd	10	—	—	—	Philadelphia Phillies	
1982	AA	43–91	.321	8th	4th	26 1/2	—	—	—	Philadelphia Phillies	
1983^	AA	66–69	.489	4th	2nd	7 1/2	2–3	.400	Lost semifinals vs. Louisville Redbirds, 3–2	Texas Rangers	
1984	AA	70–84	.455	7th	—	21	—	—	—	Texas Rangers	
1985 *	AA	79–63	.556	1st	1st	—	1–4	.250	Won Western Division title Lost AA championship vs. Louisville Redbirds, 4–1	Texas Rangers	
1986	AA	63–79	.444	8th	4th	13	—	—	—	Texas Rangers	
1987^	AA	69–71	.493	4th	—	10	2–3	.400	Lost semifinals vs. Denver Zephyrs, 3–2	Texas Rangers	
1988	AA	67–74	.475	7th	4th	13 1/2	—	—	—	Texas Rangers	
1989	AA	59–86	.407	8th	4th	14 1/2	—	—	—	Texas Rangers	
1990	AA	58–87	.400	8th	4th	27 1/2	—	—	—	Texas Rangers	
1991	AA	52–92	.361	7th	4th	27	—	—	—	Texas Rangers	
1992 * †	AA	74–70	.514	3rd	1st	—	4–0	1.000	Won Western Division title Won AA championship vs. Buffalo Bisons, 4–0	Texas Rangers	
1993	AA	54–90	.375	8th	4th	31	—	—	—	Texas Rangers	
1994	AA	61–83	.424	7th	—	25 1/2	—	—	—	Texas Rangers	
1995	AA	54–89	.378	8th	—	33 1/2	—	—	—	Texas Rangers	
1996^ †	AA	74–70	.514	5th	2nd	5	6–2	.750	Won semifinals vs. Omaha Royals, 3–1; Won AA championship vs. Indianapolis Indians, 3–1	Texas Rangers	
1997	AA	61–82	.427	6th	3rd	13	—	—	—	Texas Rangers	
1998	PCL	74–70	.514	9th (tie)	2nd (tie)	3	—	—	—	Texas Rangers	
1999 * §	PCL	83–59	.585	2nd	1st	—	4–4	.500	Won American Conference Eastern Division title Won American Conference title vs. Omaha Golden Spikes, 3–1; Lost PCL championship vs. Vancouver Canadians, 3–1	Texas Rangers	
2000	PCL	69–74	.483	8th	2nd	13 1/2	—	—	—	Texas Rangers	
2001	PCL	74–69	.517	6th	2nd	10	—	—	—	Texas Rangers	
2002 *	PCL	75–69	.521	5th (tie)	1st (tie)	—	0–3	.000	Won American Conference Eastern Division title Lost American Conference title vs. Salt Lake Stingers, 3–0	Texas Rangers	
2003	PCL	70–72	.493	8th (tie)	2nd (tie)	10 1/2	—	—	—	Texas Rangers	
2004 *	PCL	81–63	.563	2nd	1st	—	2–3	.400	Won American Conference Eastern Division title Lost American Conference title vs. Iowa Cubs, 3–2	Texas Rangers	
2005 *	PCL	80–63	.559	1st	1st	—	2–3	.400	Won American Conference Southern Division title Lost American Conference title vs. Nashville Sounds, 3–2	Texas Rangers	
2006	PCL	74–70	.514	7th (tie)	2nd	11	—	—	—	Texas Rangers	
2007	PCL	71–72	.497	10th	3rd	3 1/2	—	—	—	Texas Rangers	
2008 * §	PCL	78–68	.528	5th (tie)	1st	—	4–5	.444	Won American Conference Southern Division title Won American Conference title vs. Iowa Cubs, 3–2; Lost PCL championship vs. Sacramento River Cats, 3–1	Texas Rangers	
2009	PCL	69–75	.479	12th	2nd	11	—	—	—	Texas Rangers	
2010 *	PCL	73–70	.510	8th	1st	—	0–3	.000	Won American Conference Southern Division title Lost American Conference title vs. Memphis Redbirds, 3–0	Texas Rangers	
2011	PCL	68–75	.476	11th	4th	18 1/2	—	—	—	Houston Astros	
2012	PCL	78–65	.545	6th	2nd	1 1/2	—	—	—	Houston Astros	
2013 *	PCL	82–62	.569	1st	1st	—	0–3	.000	Won American Conference Southern Division title Lost American Conference title vs. Omaha Storm Chasers, 3–0	Houston Astros	
2014	PCL	74–70	.514	7th (tie)	2nd (tie)	2 1/2	—	—	—	Houston Astros	
2015 *	PCL	86–58	.597	1st	1st	—	0–3	.000	Won American Conference Northern Division title Lost American Conference title vs. Round Rock Express, 3–0	Los Angeles Dodgers	
2016 * §	PCL	81–60	.574	2nd	1st	—	4–5	.444	Won American Conference Northern Division title Won American Conference title vs. Nashville Sounds, 3–2; Lost PCL championship vs. El Paso Chihuahuas, 3–1	Los Angeles Dodgers	
2017	PCL	72–69	.511	6th	2nd	10	—	—	—	Los Angeles Dodgers	
2018 *	PCL	75–65	.536	4th	1st	—	1–3	.250	Won American Conference Northern Division title Lost American Conference title vs. Memphis Redbirds, 3–1	Los Angeles Dodgers	
2019	PCL	62–77	.446	12th	4th	21 1/2	—	—	—	Los Angeles Dodgers	
2020	PCL	Season cancelled (COVID-19 pandemic)								Los Angeles Dodgers	
2021	AAAW	67–62 (Note: In 2021, the team with the best record at the end of the regular-season was declared the Triple-A West champion. Oklahoma City had a 61–58 (.513) record, 11 1/2 games behind first place, which put them 5th (tie) in the league and 2nd (tie) in their division. The regular-season was followed by the Triple-A Final Stretch, a 10-game postseason tournament in which all 30 Triple-A clubs competed for the highest winning percentage. Oklahoma City finished the tournament tied for 7th place with a 6–4 (.600) record.)	.519	4th (tie)	2nd (tie)	7 1/2	—	—	—	Los Angeles Dodgers	
2022	PCL	84–66	.560	3rd	2nd	1	—	—	—	Los Angeles Dodgers	
2023^ †	PCL	90–66	.608	1st	1st	—	2–1	.667	Won first-half title Won PCL championship vs. Round Rock Express, 2–0; Lost Triple-A championship vs. Norfolk Tides, 1–0	Los Angeles Dodgers	
2024	PCL	79–71	.527	5th	2nd	14 1/2	—	—	—	Los Angeles Dodgers	
2025	PCL	84–66	.560	2nd	1st	—	—	—	—	Los Angeles Dodgers	
2026^ † ‡	PCL	89–60	.597	1st	1st	—	3–1	.750	Won second-half title Won PCL championship vs. Las Vegas Aviators, 2−1; Won Triple-A championship vs. Rochester Red Wings, 1–0	Los Angeles Dodgers	
Totals	—	4,515–4,624	.494	—	—	—	47–57	.452	—	—	—

== Notable players ==
- Jim Acker, pitcher
- Manny Alexander, infielder
- Eddy Alvarez, second baseman
- Andy Barkett, first baseman
- Cody Bellinger, outfielder/first baseman
- Hank Blalock, third baseman/first baseman
- Jason Botts, outfielder
- Steve Buechele, third baseman
- Michael Busch, infielder
- Marlon Byrd, outfielder
- Walker Buehler, pitcher
- Francisco Cordero, pitcher
- Carl Crawford, left fielder
- Nelson Cruz, outfielder
- Chris Davis, first baseman
- Doug Davis, pitcher
- Edwin Diaz, pitcher
- R. A. Dickey, pitcher
- Kelly Dransfeldt, infielder
- Justin Duchscherer, pitcher
- David Elder, pitcher
- Scott Feldman, pitcher
- Neftalí Feliz, pitcher
- Adrián González, first baseman
- Juan González, outfielder/designated hitter
- Travis Hafner, first baseman/designated hitter
- Matt Harrison, pitcher
- Jason Hart, first baseman
- Gabe Kapler, outfielder
- Clayton Kershaw, pitcher
- Dallas Keuchel, pitcher
- Hyeseong Kim, infielder
- Ian Kinsler, second baseman
- Danny Kolb, pitcher
- Duane Kuiper, second baseman
- Gerald Laird, catcher
- Mike Lamb, third baseman
- Zach Lee, starting pitcher
- Ryan Ludwick, outfielder
- Spike Lundberg, pitcher
- Gavin Lux, infielder/outfielder
- Rick Manning, center fielder
- J. D. Martinez, outfielder
- Tug McGraw, pitcher
- Zach McKinstry, infielder
- Mitch Moreland, first baseman/outfielder
- Max Muncy, third baseman
- Aaron Myette, pitcher
- Jeff Newman, catcher
- Alexi Ogando, pitcher
- Andy Pages, outfielder
- Carlos Peña, first baseman
- Santiago Perez, infielder/outfielder
- Yasiel Puig, outfielder
- J.R. Richard, starting pitcher
- John Rocker, pitcher
- Keibert Ruiz, catcher
- Jarrod Saltalamacchia, catcher
- Ryne Sandberg, second baseman
- Corey Seager, shortstop
- Rubén Sierra, outfielder
- Will Smith, catcher
- Justin Smoak, first baseman
- Sammy Sosa, outfielder
- George Springer, outfielder
- Miguel Vargas, infielder
- Edinson Vólquez, pitcher
- C.J. Wilson, pitcher
- Michael Young, infielder
- Josh Zeid, pitcher

== Radio and broadcasters ==
Oklahoma City Comets games are broadcast on KGHM (AM) 1340 The Game, televised on MiLB.TV, and streamed live for free on the Bally Live app. During the 2018 season, some games were broadcast locally on YurView Oklahoma on Cox Cable Oklahoma channel 703 and simulcast on Cox digital HD channels 1333 or 1334, depending on local high school football broadcasts; this started on June 15, 2018, against the Salt Lake Bees. Since the 2024 season, Sunday home games have been televised locally on KOCB Channal 34, simulcasted by MILB-TV & Bally Sports Live, and broadcast on the radio.

Since 2012, the main radio voice for the Oklahoma City Comets has been Alex Freedman. He began the season as color commentator alongside J.P. Shadrick but soon took over the main broadcast position when after Shadrick took a job with the NFL's Jacksonville Jaguars. When Freedman is absent, games are sometimes called by Randy Renner, sports director of KGHM (AM) 1340 The Game/News-radio 1000 KTOK-AM .

Nearly a dozen of the team's radio play-by-play broadcasters have advanced to the major league level:

- Curt Gowdy (late 1940s): worked as a broadcaster for the New York Yankees, Boston Red Sox, MLB on NBC, and MLB on CBS Radio; Ford C. Frick Award winner
- Bob Murphy (1949–1952): later broadcast for the Boston Red Sox, Baltimore Orioles, New York Mets, MLB on CBS Radio, and The Baseball Network; Ford C. Frick Award winner
- Dewayne Staats (1973–1974): later worked for the Houston Astros, Chicago Cubs, New York Yankees, The Baseball Network, MLB on ESPN, Tampa Bay Rays, and MLB on Fox
- Mike Nail (1975–1979): He later became the voice of the Arkansas Razorbacks basketball team under coaches Eddie Sutton and Nolan Richardson
- John Rooney (1980–82): later worked for MLB on CBS Radio, Minnesota Twins, Chicago White Sox, The Baseball Network, MLB on Fox, MLB on ESPN Radio, and the St. Louis Cardinals.
- Brian Barnhart (1989–94): broadcaster for the Los Angeles Angels of Anaheim, also served for one season as an alternate broadcaster for the Oklahoma City Blazers hockey team (1992–1993)
- Joe Simpson (1985): worked for the Seattle Mariners, Atlanta Braves, TBS Superstation, and MLB on TBS
- Jack Damrill (1995–1999): Left to work as a weekend sports anchor for Oklahoma City NBC affiliate KFOR-TV News Channel 4, and also worked for the University of Oklahoma broadcasting both the baseball and women's basketball teams. Later worked as a radio voice for the Oklahoma City Energy FC of the USL for their inaugural season in 2014 only. Now works in media relations as a spokesman for the Oklahoma Turnpike Authority.
- Jim Byers (1998 as color commentator; July 1999–2002 and 2004–2010 as main broadcaster): Left the Redhawks in early 2003 to host a local sports talk show called "The Sports Edge with Jim Byers" on KREF-1400 AM in Norman, Oklahoma but returned to the team in early 2004. He also worked as an announcer for Remington Park, a horse racing track in Oklahoma City from (1988–early 1999), and served as a fill-in then later became a full time voice for the Oklahoma City Blazers (2005–2009) and co-hosted the Blazers weekly radio talk show "Strictly Hockey Blazers Style" featuring interviews with coaches and players (2005–2010), and has also worked for the Tulsa Oilers (1996–1999), the Wichita Thunder (as a fill-in voice for road games only for the remainder of the 2002–2003 season), the University of Oklahoma as an interim broadcaster for both the university's women's basketball (2001–2002) and men's baseball team's (mid 2003-early 2004), and was the voice for the American Hockey League's Oklahoma City Barons from 2010 to 2015, when the franchise moved to Bakersfield and became the Bakersfield Condors. In the fall of 2015 only, Byers was cohost of Friday Night Finals, a weekly local High School Football highlight show aired on KGHM (AM) 1340 or sister station KTOK-AM showcasing game scores and results from around the state during the High School football season. Byers also worked as a linesman in the Central Hockey League from 1992 to 1995. Byers worked for Lone Star Park in the Dallas-Fort Worth metropolis as their track announcer (2016–Unknown). In 2025, Byers returned to the Oklahoma City Comets as an official game scorer (2025-Present).
- Dave Garrett (2003): Former radio voice for the Dallas Cowboys (1995–1998 including Super Bowl XXX) and New Orleans Saints (1992–1993) of the NFL, from 1986 to 1987 was sports director at WKY-AM and from 1987 to 1992 was sports talk host on sister station KTOK-AM both in Oklahoma City, and was a fill-in play-by-play broadcaster of Oklahoma State Cowboys football games and also did spot play-by-play for Oklahoma State Basketball, and worked high school championships and all-star games and Oklahoma football games on the Oklahoma News Network. He later worked for Oral Roberts University as voice for both the men's and women's basketball teams (1999–2004). In early 2004, Garrett was informed by the then new Redhawks ownership & management he was being let go for the 2004 season in favor of bringing back former broadcaster Jim Byers. Garrett took a job with KREF-1400 AM from 2004 to 2005 (in a bit of a so-called job swap with Jim Byers). In 2006 he returned to his old job as sports director at KTOK-AM and its new sister station KGHM (AM) 1340 The Game from 2006 to 2012, prior to that in the Fall of 2005 he was cohost of Friday Night Finals, a weekly local High School Football highlight show aired on KGHM (AM) 1340 or sister station KTOK-AM showcasing game scores and results from around the state during the High School football season. He also hosted a weekday afternoon sports show on 1340 The Game before briefly ending the show for a few months to focus on his duties as station sports director before returning the show and hosting it until he was laid off as part of nationwide layoffs at Clear Channel Communications. He also hosted a local show called "DG on the Radio" on KRXO-107.7 FM (2013–2018) and was the play-by-play announcer for Westwood One radio coverage of the National Football League through 2001. Garrett currently serves as the voice of the University of Central Oklahoma Bronchos football and men's and women's basketball teams (2007–2017).
- J.P. Shadrick (2011–early April 2012): Was the Play-by-play voice of the Jacksonville Suns Baseball team. In early April 2012, Shadrick left the RedHawks after the first homestead of the 2012 season to take a job with the Jacksonville Jaguars. Currently, Shadrick is part of the broadcast team for the Jacksonville Jaguars of the NFL as host of pregame and postgame shows, occasional sideline reporter, and one of the hosts of the Jaguars weekly highlight show.

== Roster ==
Oklahoma City Comets roster
Players	Coaches/Other
Pitchers: 51 Charlie Barnes; 18 Chris Campos; 99 Ben Casparius #; 44 Jake Cousins #; 29 Jackson Ferris ~; 38 Paul Gervase *; 34 Seth Halvorsen *; 20 Jonathan Hernández; 35 Kyle Hurt *; 19 Cole Irvin; 31 Landon Knack *; 33 Antonio Knowles ~; 57 Ronan Kopp *; 56 Garrett McDaniels; 12 Griff McGarry; 28 Bobby Miller *; 35 Nick Robertson ~; 45 Christian Romero; 54 Jerming Rosario; 11 Ryder Ryan ~; 32 Emmet Sheehan *; 77 Gavin Stone #; Catchers: 8 Eliézer Alfonzo Jr. *; 0 Ben Rortvedt; 14 Chadwick Tromp; Infielders: 12 David Bote ‡; 9 Ryan Fitzgerald; 76 Alex Freeland *; 2 Austin Gauthier; 15 Matt Gorski; 6 Hyeseong Kim *; 7 Noah Miller; Outfielders: 4 Zach Ehrhard; 17 Chris Newell ~; 8 Mike Sirota; 5 Alek Thomas; 3 James Tibbs III; Designated hitters: 55 Josue De Paula *	Manager: 46 Scott Hennessey; Coaches: 16 David Anderson (pitching); 26 David Dahl (outfield); 48 Ryan Dennick (pitching); -- Paul Fournier (performance); -- KJ Hallgren (coach); 52 Tyler Hollow (development); 47 Dylan Nasiastka (hitting); -- Ethan Quarles (performance); 30 Dickie Joe Thon (bench); 60-day injured list: 93 Yency Almonte; -- Tyler Fitzgerald; 7-day injured list; * On Los Angeles Dodgers 40-man roster; ~ Development list; # Rehab assignment; ∞ Reserve list; ‡ Restricted list; § Suspended list; † Temporarily inactive list; Roster updated September 25, 2026; Transactions; → More rosters: MiLB • Pacific Coast League; → Los Angeles Dodgers minor league players

== See also ==
- Oklahoma City Dodgers players (2015–2023)
- Oklahoma City RedHawks players (2009–2014)
- Oklahoma RedHawks players (1998–2008)
- Oklahoma City 89ers players (1962–1997)

== Notes ==
Preceded by San Diego Padres; San Diego Padres	Pacific Coast League champions 1963; 1965	Succeeded by San Diego Padres; Seattle Angels
Preceded by Denver Zephyrs; Louisville Redbirds	American Association champions 1992; 1996	Succeeded by Iowa Cubs; Buffalo Bisons
