= KZUE =

- El Reno, Oklahoma; United States
- Broadcast area: Oklahoma City Metroplex
- Frequency: 1460 kHz
- Branding: La Tremenda Radio México

Programming
- Format: Spanish variety
- Affiliations: Univision Radio

Ownership
- Owner: La Tremenda Radio Mexico, Inc.

History
- First air date: 1962
- Former call signs: KELR (1962–1978); KCAN (1978–1985)
- Call sign meaning: Heritage calls of KJYO from 1977–81, for station's rock format known as "The Zoo"

Technical information
- Licensing authority: FCC
- Facility ID: 36185
- Class: D
- Power: 500 watts day
- Transmitter coordinates: 35°30′30″N 97°54′0″W
- Translators: K249EN 97.7 (El Reno); K249FG 97.7 (Oklahoma City)

Links
- Public license information: Public file; LMS
- Webcast: http://s4.viastreaming.net/9010/

KZUE (1460 AM) is a radio station broadcasting a Spanish variety format. Licensed to El Reno, Oklahoma, United States, the station serves the Oklahoma City area. The station is currently owned by La Tremenda Radio Mexico and uses programming from Univision Radio.

== History ==
The first call sign of the station was KELR. The radio equipment was installed in 1962. The call sign was changed to KCAN beginning on November 3, 1978. On July 18, 1985, the station changed its call sign to the current KZUE. The station attempted to trade on the goodwill of the rock format under those call letters on what is now KJYO from 1977–81, though it was not successful.

The station was then passed down to George Calderon Ochoa, and he made the station the first one in Oklahoma City with a Spanish-language format, before selling the station down the line to Nancy Galvan.

== Transmitter ==
Call sign	Frequency	City of license	FID	ERP (W)	HAAT	Class	FCC info
K249EN	(97.7 MHz) FM	El Reno, Oklahoma	156309	250	44 m (144 ft)	D	LMS
K249FG	(97.7 MHz) FM	Oklahoma City, Oklahoma	203040	250	41 m (135 ft)	D	LMS
