= WFCV-FM =

Coordinates: 40.869°N 85.172°W

Bluffton, Indiana; United States
- Broadcast area: Fort Wayne, Indiana
- Frequency: 100.1 MHz

Programming
- Format: Religious (WFCV simulcast)

Ownership
- Owner: Bott Radio Network; (Bott Communications, Inc.)

History
- Former call signs: WCRD (1962–1986); WBGT (1986–1989); WNUY (1989–2011)

Technical information
- Licensing authority: FCC
- Facility ID: 71464
- Class: A
- ERP: 6,000 watts
- HAAT: 91 meters (299 ft)

Links
- Public license information: Public file; LMS
- Website: WFCV-FM Online

WFCV-FM (100.1 FM) is a radio station whose city of license is Bluffton, Indiana, United States. The station was owned by Independence Media Holdings and the broadcast license was held by IM IN Licenses, LLC.

WFCV-FM switched to the Bott Radio Network Christian talk format, effective at Noon, Friday, June 24, 2011, and will share calls with its sister AM station, 1090 AM WFCV.

WFCV-FM broadcasts a religious talk radio format to the Fort Wayne, Indiana, area.

== Programming ==
Prior to the adoption of the talk format in the spring of 2008, WFCV-FM was "Y-100", an adult contemporary music station broadcasting the Delilah Rene program from Premiere Radio Networks during the evening.

FM 100 Talks featured syndicated hosts such as Laura Ingraham, Don Imus, Dave Ramsey, Jim Rome, Michael Savage and Dennis Miller and also aired some programming from Fox Sports Radio. FM 100 Talks also broadcast local high school sports with veteran sportscaster Dick Stimpson, Cliff Tanner & Pete LaFaucia

FM 100 Talks was the flagship Station for Speed Talk and RadioSpeedTalk.com Hosted by Cliff Tanner & Pete LaFaucia

FM 100 Talks was the home of Sounds of Worship for 19 years hosted by Tim Steffen the only show dedicated to Southern Gospel in Northeast Indiana.
