= KAOW =

Bott Radio Network station in Fort Smith, Arkansas

- Fort Smith, Arkansas; United States
- Broadcast area: Fort Smith
- Frequency: 88.9 MHz

Programming
- Format: Christian Talk
- Affiliations: Bott Radio Network

Ownership
- Owner: Community Broadcasting, Inc.

Technical information
- Licensing authority: FCC
- Facility ID: 1617
- Class: C2
- ERP: 20,000 watts
- HAAT: 147 meters (482 ft)
- Transmitter coordinates: 35°26′50.9″N 94°21′53.7″W
- Translators: K262DM (100.3 MHz, Fort Smith)

Links
- Public license information: Public file; LMS
- Website: http://www.bottradionetwork.com

KAOW (88.9 MHz FM) is a radio station broadcasting a Christian Talk radio format. It is licensed to Fort Smith, Arkansas, United States, and serves the Fort Smith area.

The station was originally owned by the American Family Association and was an affiliate of American Family Radio. In February 2017, it was announced that the station would be sold to Bott Media's Community Broadcasting, along with KASD, for $460,000. The sale of KAOW and KASD to Community Broadcasting was consummated on May 26, 2017. Both stations joined Bott Radio Network in June.
