= KJYO =

Contemporary hit radio station in Oklahoma City

Coordinates: 35.597833°N 97.48975°W

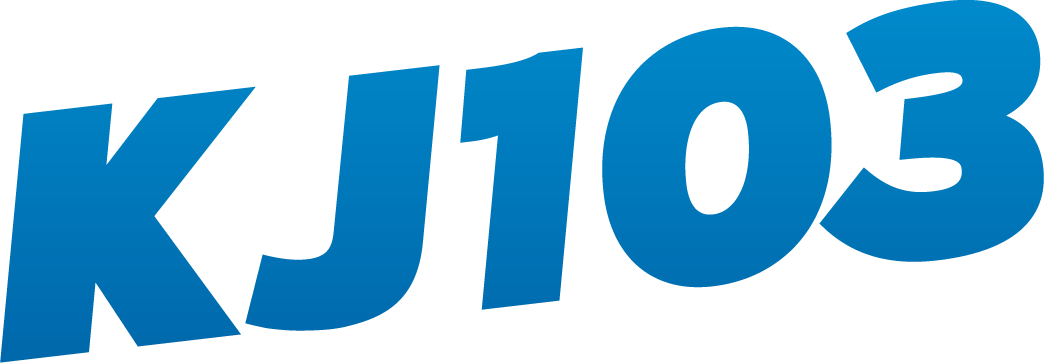
- Oklahoma City, Oklahoma; United States
- Broadcast area: Oklahoma City Metroplex
- Frequency: 102.7 MHz (HD Radio)
- Branding: KJ103

Programming
- Format: Top 40 (CHR)
- Affiliations: Premiere Networks

Ownership
- Owner: iHeartMedia; (iHM Licenses, LLC)
- Sister stations: KGHM, KOKQ, KTOK, KTST, KXXY-FM

History
- First air date: April 9, 1961
- Former call signs: KJEM (1961–1972); KAFG (1972–1977); KZUE (1977–1981)
- Call sign meaning: The word "joy" transposed, from the station's time as an easy listening station

Technical information
- Licensing authority: FCC
- Facility ID: 11918
- Class: C0
- ERP: 100,000 watts
- HAAT: 372 meters (1,220 ft)

Links
- Public license information: Public file; LMS
- Webcast: Listen Live
- Website: kj103fm.iheart.com

KJYO (102.7 FM), known as "KJ103", is a top 40 (CHR) radio station serving the Oklahoma City area owned by iHeartMedia. Its transmitter is in Northeast Oklahoma City, and studios were located in the 50 Penn Place building on the Northwest side, in early 2022 iHeartMedia Oklahoma City moved KJYO along with sister stations KGHM, KTOK, KTST, KXXY-FM, KREF-FM, to new state of the art studios located at 6525 N Meridian Ave further up the road on the Northwest side just a few miles west from their former studio home in the 50 Penn Place building.

== History ==
The station began broadcasting April 8, 1961, as KJEM-FM, sister to KJEM (800 AM), and adopted an adult standards format. Studios were located where the Oklahoma City Federal Building (Murrah Building) once stood. It changed calls in 1972 to KAFG and ran an automated oldies format. KAFG's transmitter site was at 23rd and N. Classen on top of the Citizen's National Bank tower.

In May 1977 it re-launched as a rock station known as "The Zoo" and adopted the callsign KZUE. During this time it was owned by INSILCO Broadcasting which later changed its name to Clear Channel Radio, and eventually iHeartMedia. After losing its audience to the then new KOFM (now Magic 104.1), it became an AC station known as "Z-103" in 1979. The station adopted the handle "K-Joy" (The Joy of Oklahoma) and an easy listening format in 1981 and changed its callsign to KJYO. It has been a Top 40 (CHR) since January 1983, but leaned towards the Rhythmic Top 40 format in 1989–1991 when it was known as "Kontinuous Jams." Mike McCoy served as Program Director from 1989 until 2017. JJ Ryan joined KJ103 in 2017 as Program Director and is the Vice President of Programming for iHeartMedia Oklahoma City.

KJYO, along with the other iHeartMedia Oklahoma City stations, simulcast audio of KFOR-TV if a Tornado Warning is issued within the Oklahoma City metro area.
