= Jones Creek (Pee Dee River tributary) =

Stream in North Carolina, USA

Jones Creek Tributary to Pee Dee River
- Location of Jones Creek mouth Jones Creek (Pee Dee River tributary) (the United States)

Location
- Country: United States
- State: North Carolina
- County: Anson

Physical characteristics
- Source: confluence of North and South Forks of Jones Creek
  - location: about 1.5 miles north of Morven, North Carolina
  - coordinates: 34°53′39″N 080°00′09″W
  - elevation: 219 ft (67 m)
- Mouth: Pee Dee River
  - location: about 2 miles southeast of Cairo, North Carolina
  - coordinates: 34°51′44″N 079°53′39″W
  - elevation: 103 ft (31 m)
- Length: 12.27 mi (19.75 km)
- Basin size: 104.40 square miles (270.4 km^{2})
- Discharge
  - location: Pee Dee River
  - average: 106.26 cu ft/s (3.009 m^{3}/s) at mouth with Pee Dee River

Basin features
- Progression: northeast then southeast
- River system: Pee Dee River
- Tributaries
  - left: North Fork; Hale Creek
  - right: South Fork
- Bridges: Diggs Road, NC 145, Pit Road

Jones Creek is a 12.27 mi (19.75 km) long 4th order tributary to the Pee Dee River in Anson County, North Carolina.

== Course ==
Jones Creek is formed at the confluence of North and South Forks of Jones Creek about 1.5 miles north of Morven, North Carolina. Jones Creek then flows northeast and turns southeast to meet the Pee Dee River about 2 miles southeast of Cairo.

== Watershed ==
Jones Creek drains 104.40 square miles (270.4 km^{2}) of area, receives about 48.0 in/year of precipitation, has a topographic wetness index of 412.50 and is about 58% forested.
