= KGHM (AM) =

Sports radio station in Oklahoma City

Coordinates: 35°29′58″N 97°30′33″W

- Midwest City, Oklahoma; United States
- Broadcast area: Oklahoma City Metroplex
- Frequency: 1340 kHz
- Branding: 1340 The Game

Programming
- Format: Sports
- Affiliations: Fox Sports Radio; Oklahoma City Dodgers

Ownership
- Owner: iHeartMedia, Inc.; (iHM Licenses, LLC)
- Sister stations: KJYO, KOKQ, KTOK, KTST, KXXY-FM

History
- First air date: 1922 (as KGCB)
- Former call signs: KGCB (1922-1930s); KOCY (1930s-1983); KXXY (1983–1984); KCNN (1984–1985); KXXY (1985–1996); KEBC (1996–2010)

Technical information
- Licensing authority: FCC
- Facility ID: 58388
- Class: C
- Power: 1,000 watts

Links
- Public license information: Public file; LMS
- Webcast: Listen Live
- Website: 1340thegame.iheart.com

KGHM (1340 kHz) is a commercial AM radio station licensed to Midwest City, Oklahoma, and serving the Oklahoma City Metroplex. It is among a cluster of stations in the market owned by iHeartMedia, Inc. KGHM carries the syndicated Fox Sports Radio Network and also airs local high school and college sports.

KGHM's transmitter is located blocks from the Oklahoma State Capitol. It broadcasts at 1,000 watts around the clock using a non-directional antenna. The studios and offices were located in the 50 Penn Place building on the Northwest side, in early 2022 iHeartMedia Oklahoma City moved KGHM along with sister stations KTOK, KJYO, KTST, KREF-FM, KXXY-FM to new state of the art studios located at 6525 N Meridian Ave further up the road on the Northwest side just a few miles west from their former studio home in the 50 Penn Place building.

== History ==
=== KGCB/KOCY ===
The station first signed on the air in 1922, making it among the first radio stations in Oklahoma City. It started as KGCB, a church-owned station. The call letters were randomly assigned from a sequential roster of available call signs. It was purchased in the late 1930s by Matthew Bonebrake - a former OPUBCO and WKY radio sales manager - who changed the call letters to KOCY.

KOCY was a Mutual Broadcasting System network affiliate during the 1940s and early 1950s. It became Oklahoma City's first full-time Top 40 station in the mid-1950s. It was also the first radio station in the country to offer "News Every Hour - On the Hour".

After WKY and KOMA also switched to Top 40, with more powerful transmitters, KOCY management realized the station couldn't compete with the two new Top 40 outlets. KOCY had a "funeral" for its Top 40 format, by giving away records in a coffin. It then switched to a middle of the road (MOR) format of popular adult music.

=== Urban music ===
In the mid-1990s, KEBC aired an Urban Contemporary format in the evenings and overnights as "The Groove 1340".

In 2000, Clear Channel Communications went into an agreement with Perry Broadcasting to broadcast KVSP and its Urban format on KEBC from 7 p.m.-7 a.m. as "The Power Jammin' Network" after KVSP signed off at sunset. Between 7 a.m.-7 p.m., KGHM aired Regional Mexican programming directed at Oklahoma City's Mexican-American community.

The agreement between Clear Channel and Perry Broadcasting discontinued when Perry purchased KRPT in Anadarko, Oklahoma and upgraded the station to target Oklahoma City, then moved KVSP's Urban format to the FM dial. The Regional Mexican format was ended as the station switched to a Talk radio format.

=== "Keeping Everybody Country" ===
KEBC's call letters were previously used for KEBC, later a property also owned by Clear Channel. The station's slogan, "Keeping Everybody Country." Ironically, KEBC's competitor at the time, KXXY-FM, simulcast their FM signal at 1340 AM.

The call letters KEBC stood for Electronic Broadcasting Company which was the original ownership of KEBC. KEBC originally had its offices and transmitter at the "Rambling Ranchstyle studios" in Southeast OKC before moving to 31st and Western to studio space owned by Ralph Tyler.

Mounting debt to Tyler for rent and other financial obligation created a situation where Tyler became controlling owner of KEBC radio. After Ralph Tyler's controlling ownership of KEBC, the slogan "Keep Everybody Country" was formed on a suggestion from a friend of Ralph's.

=== Sports radio ===
As a time brokered Spanish (days) and Urban (nights) station in the early to mid 2000s, starting in early 2005, KGHM simulcast some programming of sister station KTOK along with some original shows. In January 2007, Clear Channel flipped the station to "Fox Sports Radio 1340." It later became "1340 The Game," making it the fourth all-sports station in Oklahoma City.

Former Dallas Cowboys and (Oklahoma RedHawks 2003 season only under KEBC.) play-by-play broadcaster David Garrett was KGHM's sports director. Garrett had worked as sports director for co-owned KTOK (and WKY, under lease management to Clear Channel) in the late 1980s. Garrett also hosted an afternoon sports talk show on KGHM from January 2007 to early 2008 and returned to hosting in late spring/early summer of 2008. Garrett was also did play-by-play for some on the Oklahoma City High School Football games that aired on KGHM as well. In the Spring 2013, the KGHM and KTOK's sports director job went to Randy Renner, a former long time field News reporter for Oklahoma City CBS affiliate KWTV-TV.

In mid-March 2003, following the sale of the Blazers primary radio home and then sister station WKY to Citadel Broadcasting, it was announced that then KEBC would carry the Oklahoma City Blazers hockey games for the remainder of the 2002-2003 Central Hockey League season and playoffs, KEBC also aired the Blazers radio talk show "Strictly Hockey Blazers Style", a one-hour weekly talk show that aired live every Monday night throughout the Blazers season and playoffs from the location of an Oklahoma City area restaurant. It featured interviews with players, coach's, trainers and team staff, it was hosted by longtime Blazers play-by-play broadcaster John Brooks (1992–2005, 2005-2009 semi retired.) and was later co-hosted along with Brooks by longtime fill-in (And later full-time.) play-by-play broadcaster Jim Byers (2000-2005 fill-in, 2005-2009 full-time).

KEBC carried the Blazers again for the 2003–2004 season. In 2006 following a two-year absence, the Blazers returned to 1340 AM along with the Oklahoma City RedHawks baseball team after WKY (under Citadel Broadcasting ownership) flipped from News/Talk to Spanish. The Blazers stayed on 1340 AM until the team folded in July 2009 after 17 seasons. Whenever there were scheduling or programming conflicts with the primary radio home of the Barons (KXXY), KGHM carried selected games of the Oklahoma City Barons Hockey team from 2010 to 2011 thru the 2014–2015 seasons, when the team was disbanded. KOCY was also the station that carried the games of the original Oklahoma City Blazers hockey franchise in the original Central Hockey League from the late 1960s and through the late 1970s.

For a time, local sports talk shows were simulcast with KREF, also a Fox Sports Radio affiliate, in Norman. For several years, KGHM also carried University of Central Oklahoma Bronchos Football and Men's and Women's Basketball games. Along with sister station KXXY, KGHM also airs select Oklahoma State University Cowboys football games with local Oklahoma high school football games on Friday and Saturday nights. Some Oklahoma high school basketball games are also aired.

Friday Night Finals, a weekly two hour show of statewide high school football scores and highlights, aired on Friday nights. Game Day Saturday, a look at college football games, specifically University of Oklahoma and Oklahoma State football was on the weekend schedule. Both shows were produced by the Oklahoma News Network, an iHeartMedia-owned statewide network.

Since 2003, and again from 2006-present, KGHM has carried the games of the Oklahoma City Dodgers Pacific Coast League Minor League baseball team affiliate of the Los Angeles Dodgers, while some select games (Those conflicting with college football also broadcast on KGHM (AM) 1340 The Game.) are broadcast on FM sister station KREF-FM 94.7 the REF. Starting with the 2015 Major League Baseball season, the station (along with sister station KTOK) began carrying some games as part of the Los Angeles Dodgers radio network. In late 2018, KGHM's affiliation with the Los Angeles Dodgers radio network expired and was not renewed, ending sixteen years of professional baseball airing on both stations.

From 2008 to 2016, KGHM also carried games as part of the National Football League Dallas Cowboys radio network.
