= WECV =

Bott Radio Network station in Nashville

- Nashville, Tennessee; United States
- Broadcast area: Nashville, Tennessee
- Frequency: 89.1 MHz

Programming
- Format: Religious
- Network: Bott Radio Network

Ownership
- Owner: Bott Radio Network; (Community Broadcasting, Inc.)

History
- First air date: May 23, 1967

Technical information
- Licensing authority: FCC
- Class: C3
- ERP: 22,000 watts
- HAAT: 59 meters (194 ft)
- Translator: 99.5 W258AD (Clarksville)

Links
- Public license information: Public file; LMS
- Website: bottradionetwork.com/stations/tennessee/nashville

WECV (89.1 FM) is a radio station operated by Bott Radio Network, with a Christian talk/teaching format.

Until 2011, the station was owned by Trevecca Nazarene University, and played Contemporary Christian music.

A key figure in the station's history is former general manager David Deese. Deese, who still teaches at the university, led the radio station as a student, then as a faculty member. He was able to increase the station's transmission power on a couple of occasions and helped the university purchase 760 AM WENO and later put WNRZ, a repeater at 91.5 MHz in Dickson, on the air.

WECV is simulcast on WNRZ (covering western Middle Tennessee) and translator stations on 93.9 in Gallatin and 99.5 in Clarksville.

In the fall of 2010, Trevecca Nazarene University announced the sale of WNAZ, WNRZ and its translator stations to Bott Radio Network. On February 18, 2011, at noon, the station was transferred to Bott, at which time it began airing Bott Radio Network programming. The WNAZ call letters were officially changed to WECV several days later.

== Translators ==
Call sign	Frequency	City of license	FID	ERP (W)	HAAT	Class	Transmitter coordinates	FCC info
WNRZ	91.5 FM	Dickson, Tennessee	67638	8000	80 m (262 ft)	C3	36°0′36.00″N 87°30′47.00″W	LMS

Broadcast translators for WECV/WNRZ
Call sign	Frequency	City of license	FID	ERP (W)	HAAT	Class	FCC info
W230AD	93.9 FM	Gallatin, Tennessee	67635	100	115 m (377 ft)	D	LMS
W258AD	99.5 FM	Clarksville, Tennessee	63446	27	0 m (0 ft)	D	LMS
