= KQCV (AM) =

Bott Radio Network station in Oklahoma City

- Oklahoma City, Oklahoma; United States
- Broadcast area: Oklahoma City metropolitan area
- Frequency: 800 kHz

Programming
- Format: Christian talk and teaching
- Network: Bott Radio Network

Ownership
- Owner: Bott Broadcasting Company

History
- First air date: 1948
- Former call signs: KTOW (1948–1960); KJEM (1960–1972); KLEC (1972–1976)
- Call sign meaning: "Quality Christian Voice"

Technical information
- Licensing authority: FCC
- Facility ID: 6487
- Class: B
- Power: 2,500 watts (day); 1,000 watts (night)
- Transmitter coordinates: 35°24′45.2″N 97°40′27.1″W
- Translators: 95.7 K239BT (The Village); 102.3 K272FD (Del City); 107.1 K296HC (El Reno)
- Repeater: 95.1 KQCV-FM (Shawnee)

Links
- Public license information: Public file; LMS
- Webcast: Listen live
- Website: bottradionetwork.com

KQCV (800 AM) is a radio station licensed to Oklahoma City, Oklahoma, United States. It is part of the Bott Radio Network of Christian radio stations and was the second station acquired by the network. Prior to that, it operated as a secular radio station from 1948 to 1976.

KQCV's transmitter is located off of County Line Road on the southwest edge of Oklahoma City; Bott Radio Network also maintains Oklahoma City offices at 1919 N. Broadway.

== History ==
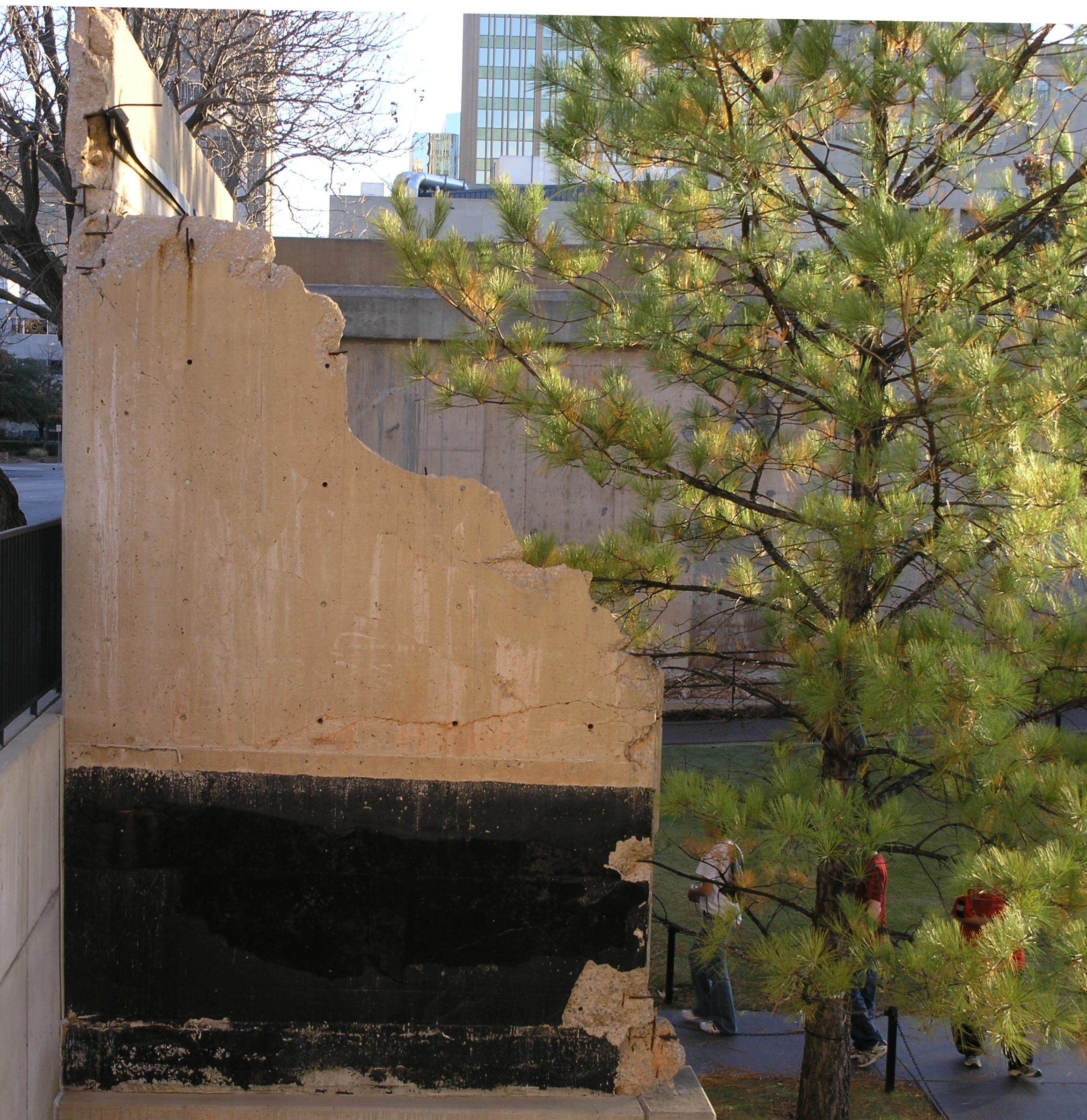
The southwest corner of 5th and Robinson, where KTOW's studios were located from 1955 to 1972, is now part of the Oklahoma City National Memorial

KTOW began broadcasting in 1948. It was owned by the Sooner Broadcasting Company; while KTOW itself was a daytime-only AM outlet, plans called for an FM station—the authorization for which would be surrendered because of the lack of sets in the area—and Sooner pursued television as well. An attempt to move to 1400 kHz, which would have allowed nighttime broadcasts, was denied in 1950. Sooner sold KTOW to Citizens Broadcasting Company of Oklahoma for $50,000 in 1955. Citizens moved KTOW to a newly converted building at the corner of NW 5th and Robinson streets in 1956; that facility stood until it was torn down in 1974 to build the Alfred P. Murrah Federal Building, being the last structure demolished to make way.

KTOW was sold to KTOW, Inc., in January 1959; the new owners suffered an immediate blow when the Mutual Broadcasting System, the network with which the station was affiliated, jumped from KTOW to KTOK, which boasted a 5,000-watt signal compared to KTOW's 250 watts. On March 1, 1960, KTOW became KJEM, promoting itself as broadcasting "the JEMs of Adult Music". April 9, 1961, brought KJEM-FM, a partial simulcast of the AM station's programming.

In 1964, the owners of KJEM bought KTOK for $625,000, selling KJEM-AM-FM for $315,000 to Radio Oklahoma, headed by the Globe Life and Accident Insurance Corporation. A 1966 blaze at the transmitter site briefly forced the station off the air; months after returning, it made an early move to an all-talk format, branded "Audience Involvement Radio".

Another sale, in 1972, would separate KJEM AM and FM. The buyer for 800 AM was a local electrical firm, Carroll Boyington and Son Electric, who paid $297,000; the call letters were changed to KLEC on September 19. KLEC aired a beautiful music format in its time with the call letters and had relocated to 1919 N. Broadway.

Carroll Boyington and Son Electric sold the station to Bott Broadcasting, Inc., of Kansas City for $284,000 in December 1975. New KQCV call letters, for "Quality Christian Voice", were instituted on January 19, 1976. KQCV was the second Bott station after KCCV in Kansas City.

Bott expanded in Oklahoma City when it acquired contemporary Christian outlet KNTL in 1994; Bott sold that station in 1997 and started noncommercial KQCV-FM.

== FM translators ==
KQCV AM's programming is available on two FM translators in and near Oklahoma City and a third in El Reno.

Broadcast translators for KQCV
Call sign	Frequency	City of license	FID	ERP (W)	HAAT	Class	FCC info
K272FD	102.3 FM	Del City, Oklahoma	140428	215	245 m (804 ft)	D	LMS
K296HC	107.1 FM	El Reno, Oklahoma	142753	250	131 m (430 ft)	D	LMS
K239BT	95.7 FM	The Village, Oklahoma	140427	250	213 m (699 ft)	D	LMS
