= KXXY-FM =

Country music radio station in Oklahoma City

- Oklahoma City, Oklahoma; United States
- Broadcast area: Oklahoma City metropolitan area
- Frequency: 96.1 MHz (HD Radio)
- Branding: 96.1 KXY

Programming
- Format: Classic country
- Subchannels: HD2: KTOK simulcast (Talk)

Ownership
- Owner: iHeartMedia, Inc.; (iHM Licenses, LLC)
- Sister stations: KGHM, KJYO, KOKQ, KTOK, KTST

History
- First air date: October 1964
- Former call signs: KOCY-FM (1964–1972)
- Call sign meaning: the extra X is not used in "KXY" branding

Technical information
- Licensing authority: FCC
- Facility ID: 58389
- Class: C0
- ERP: 100,000 watts
- HAAT: 372 meters (1,220 ft)
- Transmitter coordinates: 35.597833°N 97.48975°W

Links
- Public license information: Public file; LMS
- Webcast: Listen Live
- Website: kxy.iheart.com

KXXY-FM (96.1 MHz, "96.1 KXY") is a commercial radio station in Oklahoma City, Oklahoma and is owned by iHeartMedia, Inc. It airs a classic country radio format. In its logo, the station omits one of the two Xs in its call sign, calling itself "KXY".

KXXY-FM's studios and offices were located in the 50 Penn Place building on the Northwest side, in early 2022 iHeartMedia Oklahoma City moved KXXY-FM along with sister stations KGHM, KTOK, KJYO, KTST, KREF-FM, to new state of the art studios located at 6525 N Meridian Ave further up the road on the Northwest side just a few miles west from their former studio home in the 50 Penn Place building. The transmitter is off NE 122nd Street in Oklahoma City, near the John Kilpatrick Turnpike.

== History ==
The station signed on in October 1964 as the second KOCY-FM in Oklahoma City. For its first five years, it simulcast the middle of the road music programming of co-owned KOCY (1340 AM).

In the late 1960s, the Federal Communications Commission began encouraging AM-FM combos to offer separate programming. In 1969, KOCY-FM switched to progressive rock, styled after stations such as KMPX in San Francisco and WNEW-FM in New York City.

On October 24, 1972, the station changed its call sign to KXXY-FM to give it a separate identity from its AM sister station. Over time, it moved from free form progressive rock to a more tightly-formatted album-oriented rock format. After 13 years of rock music, management decided to make a change.

On May 27, 1982, KXXY-FM flipped to country music, stunting by playing the song "You're the Reason God Made Oklahoma" for 24 hours. KXXY-FM became an aggressive country competitor to KEBC, which had been the leading FM country outlet since signing on in 1967. KXXY-FM edged ahead of KEBC in 1983 and would widen its lead to eight share points by the end of the decade. In 1992, it peaked at an 18.4 share, and it was the top-billing station in Oklahoma City every year from 1985 to 1998. However, the station slumped in the late 1990s and 2000s.

Previous logo

In 1996, KXXY-FM was acquired by San Antonio-based Clear Channel Communications. Clear Channel later changed its name to the current iHeartMedia, Inc. in September 2014.

KXXY, along with the other iHeart stations in Oklahoma City, simulcasts audio of KFOR-TV if a tornado warning is issued within the Oklahoma City metro area.
