= Bott Radio Network =

Christian radio network in the United States

- Type: Radio network
- Country: United States
- Branding: BRN

Ownership
- Owner: Bott Broadcasting Company

Links
- Webcast: Listen Now
- Website: https://www.bottradionetwork.com/

The Bott Radio Network (BRN) is an American Christian radio network headquartered in Overland Park, Kansas. Established in 1962 by Dick Bott, the network specializes in a "Christian Talk and Teaching" format, broadcasting a curated schedule of evangelical programming across more than 130 stations in 16 states. The network's reach extends through the Midwest and into parts of the South and West, complemented by digital streaming and satellite distribution.

The network's programming features many of the most prominent voices in modern evangelicalism. Its daily lineup includes long-form teaching broadcasts such as In Touch with Charles Stanley, Turning Point with David Jeremiah, Grace to You with John MacArthur, Truth for Life with Alistair Begg, Running to Win with Erwin Lutzer, Back to the Bible with Bryan Clark, and Love Worth Finding with Adrian Rogers. In addition to theological teaching, the network provides current affairs and apologetics through programs like Jay Sekulow Live!.

== Affiliate stations ==
Bott Radio Network currently operates over 130 stations in 16 states.

Call sign	Frequency	City of license	State	Facility ID	Class	Power (W)	ERP (W)	Height (m (ft))
KCVC	90.1 FM	Cherry Valley	Arkansas	91227	C3	—	4,000	154 m (505 ft)
KAYH	90.1 FM	Fayetteville	Arkansas	79130	C2	—	25,000	111.8 m (367 ft)
KAOW	90.1 FM	Fort Smith	Arkansas	79130	C2	—	26,500	140 m (460 ft)
KWCV	88.9 FM	Fort Smith	Arkansas	79130	C1	—	64,500 (vertical only)	140 m (460 ft)
KQWM	89.3 FM	Mena	Arkansas	79130	C2	—	4,500	381 m (1,250 ft)
KCIV	99.9 FM	Mount Bullion	California	6504	B	—	1,900	638.3 m (2,094 ft)
KRNQ	96.3 FM	Keokuk	Iowa	15773	C2	—	19,000	245 m (804 ft)
WFCV	1090 AM	Fort Wayne	Indiana	6489	D	2,500 (day); 1,000 (night)	—	—
WFCV-FM	100.1 FM	Bluffton	Indiana	71464	A	—	19,000	91 m (299 ft)
WMCV	96.3 FM	Farmersburg	Indiana	184958	A	—	6,000	92.7 m (304 ft)
KTFC	103.3 FM	Sioux City	Iowa	17199	C1	—	100,000	193 m (633 ft)
KTFG	102.9 FM	Sioux Rapids	Iowa	17200	C2	—	49,000	151 m (495 ft)
KBMP	90.5 FM	Enterprise	Kansas	91037	C2	—	12,500	219.9 m (721 ft)
KARF	91.3 FM	Independence	Kansas	78930	C1	—	100,000 (vertical only)	100 m (330 ft)
KCVW	94.3 FM	Kingman	Kansas	6506	C1	—	100,000	253 m (830 ft)
KECV	91.3 FM	Madison	Kansas	764388	C3	—	5,100	127 m (417 ft)
KJRG	950 AM	Newton	Kansas	6489	D	500 (day); 147 (night)	—	—
KWJP	89.7 FM	Paola	Kansas	6506	C1	—	4,500	68 m (223 ft)
KKCV	102.5 FM	Rozel	Kansas	164111	C1	—	100,000	168.2 m (552 ft)
KCVT	92.5 FM	Silver Lake	Kansas	56244	C3	—	6,700	118 m (387 ft)
KYLF	88.9 FM	Adrian	Missouri	174965	C2	—	38,000	138 m (453 ft)
KSCV	90.1 FM	Springfield	Missouri	1622	C3	—	11,000	150 m (490 ft)
KBCV	1570 AM	Hollister	Missouri	129517	D	5,000 (day); 3,000 (night)	—	—
KCGR	90.5 FM	Oran	Missouri	173701	C3	—	2,800	73 m (240 ft)
KFCV	90.5 FM	Dixon	Missouri	173766	C3	—	3,300	156.7 m (514 ft)
KLTE	107.9 FM	Kirksville	Missouri	66670	C1	—	97,000	299 m (981 ft)
KCRL	90.3 FM	Sunrise Beach	Missouri	85069	C3	—	25,000	60 m (200 ft)
KLEX	1570 AM	Lexington	Missouri	6507	D	250 (day); 40 (night)	—	—
KJCV-FM	89.7 FM	Country Club	Missouri	89276	C2	—	37,000	150 m (490 ft)
KPBR	90.3 FM	Poplar Bluff	Missouri	10999	C3	—	25,000	77 m (253 ft)
KLUH	91.7 FM	Poplar Bluff	Missouri	173704	A	—	2,750	150 m (490 ft)
KAYX	92.5 FM	Richmond	Missouri	6508	A	—	2,350	163 m (535 ft)
KMOZ	1590 AM	Rolla	Missouri	6507	D	1,000 (day); 85 (night)	—	—
KLCV	88.5 FM	Lincoln	Nebraska	12837	C1	—	46,000	382.5 m (1,255 ft)
KCVG	89.9 FM	Hastings	Nebraska	78448	C3	—	16,000	99.3 m (326 ft)
KNCV	90.9 FM	North Platte	Nebraska	767761	C2	—	41,000 (vertical only)	94 m (308 ft)
KCVN	104.5 FM	Cozad	Nebraska	78448	C0	—	100,000	300.3 m (985 ft)
KGWO	89.5 FM	Ogallala	Nebraska	78448	C3	—	8,000 (vertical only)	43 m (141 ft)
KQCV	800 AM	Oklahoma City	Oklahoma	6487	D	2,500 (day); 1 (night)	—	—
KQCV-FM	95.1 FM	Shawnee	Oklahoma	6488	C	—	100,000	306 m (1,004 ft)
KCVP	88.3 FM	Pierre	South Dakota	767764	C2	—	26,000	133 m (436 ft)
KASD	90.3 FM	Rapid City	South Dakota	88804	A	—	3,000	133.2 ft (40.6 m)
WCRV	640 AM	Collierville	Tennessee	6486	B	50,000 (day); 480 (night)	—	—
WECV	89.1 FM	Nashville	Tennessee	67633	A	—	22,000	59 ft (18 m)
WNRZ	91.5 FM	Dickson	Tennessee	67638	A	—	13,000	78 ft (24 m)
WFMQ	91.5 FM	Dickson	Tennessee	14728	A	—	500 (horizontal only)	25 ft (7.6 m)
WCRT	640 AM	Donelson	Tennessee	25031	B	50,000 (day); 1,000 (night)	—	—
KTAA	90.7 FM	Big Sandy	Texas	1247	C1	—	42,000	166 ft (51 m)
KJCV	1450 AM	Jackson	Wyoming	160983	C	1,000	—	—

=== Translators ===
In addition to its full-power stations, Bott Radio Network is relayed by 64 translators to widen its broadcast area.

Call sign	Frequency (MHz)	City of license	State	FCC info
K208GP	89.5	Hot Springs	Arkansas	FCC (K208GP)
K237FT	95.3	Eureka Springs	Arkansas	FCC (K237FT)
K262DM	100.3	Fort Smith	Arkansas	FCC (K262DM)
K216DG	91.1	Jonesboro	Arkansas	FCC (K216DG)
K299BR	107.7	Sonora	California	FCC (K299BR)
K298CS	107.5	Victor	Idaho	FCC (K298CS)
W235CF	94.9	Quincy	Illinois	FCC (W235CF)
W229CO	93.7	Fort Wayne	Indiana	FCC (W229CO)
K242BE	96.3	Norfolk	Nebraska	FCC (K242BE)
K291BA	106.1	Manhattan	Kansas	FCC (K291BA)
K238BD	95.5	Wichita	Kansas	FCC (K300BC)
K295CL	106.9	Newton	Kansas	FCC (K300BC)
K300BC	107.9	Garden City	Kansas	FCC (K300BC)
K240EH	95.9	Pittsburg	Kansas	FCC (K240EH)
K263BK	100.5	Missouri	Missouri	FCC (K263BK)
K277BV	103.3	Hollister	Missouri	FCC (K277BV)
K252EF	98.3	Stockton	Missouri	FCC (K252EF)
K277BF	98.3	Mount Vernon	Missouri	FCC (K277BF)
K284BD	104.7	Carthage	Missouri	FCC (K284BD)
K239AS	95.7	Kimberling City	Missouri	FCC (K284BD)
K285FD	95.7	Neosho	Missouri	FCC (K285FD)
K297AN	107.3	Monett	Missouri	FCC (K297AN)
K231BF	94.1	Hermitage	Missouri	FCC (K231BF)
K265FD	100.9	Columbia	Missouri	FCC (K265FD)
K293BP	106.5	St. Robert	Missouri	FCC (K293BP)
K223CE	92.5	Fulton	Missouri	FCC (K223CE)
K246CA	97.1	Jefferson City	Missouri	FCC (K246CA)
K205FX	88.9	St. Joseph	Missouri	FCC (K205FX)
K268AW	101.5	Maryville	Missouri	FCC (K268AW)
K227CH	93.3	Hannibal	Missouri	FCC (K227CH)
K288GP	105.5	Jackson	Missouri	FCC (K288GP)
K277BJ	103.3	Cape Girardeau	Missouri	FCC (K277BJ)
K259BB	99.7	Sikeston	Missouri	FCC (K259BB)
K230BI	93.9	Warsaw	Missouri	FCC (K230BI)
K222BD	92.3	Lebanon	Missouri	FCC (K222BD)
K299BS	107.7	Lexington	Missouri	FCC (K299BS)
K229DL	93.7	Reeds Spring	Missouri	FCC (K229DL)
K280FP	103.9	Rockaway Beach	Missouri	FCC (K280FP)
K241CZ	96.1	St. James	Missouri	FCC (K280FP)
K292FO	106.3	Rolla	Missouri	FCC (K292FO)
K229BI	93.7	Omaha	Nebraska	FCC (K229BI)
K277CP	103.3	Omaha	Nebraska	FCC (K277CP)
K277CD	103.3	Beatrice	Nebraska	FCC (K277CD)
K276FI	103.1	Fremont	Nebraska	FCC (K276FI)
K257EF	99.3	York	Nebraska	FCC (K257EF)
K238AR	95.5	Columbus	Nebraska	FCC (K238AR)
K272FD	102.3	Del City	Oklahoma	FCC (K272FD)
K296HC	107.1	El Reno	Oklahoma	FCC (K296HC)
K239BT	95.7	The Village	Oklahoma	FCC (K239BT)
K227CI	93.3	Ardmore	Oklahoma	FCC (K227CI)
K264BT	100.7	Muskogee	Oklahoma	FCC (K227CI)
K260CV	99.9	Stillwater	Oklahoma	FCC (K260CV)
K293BO	106.5	Lawton	Oklahoma	FCC (K293BO)
K223CG	92.5	Sand Springs	Oklahoma	FCC (K223CG)
K231BH	94.1	Oklahoma City	Oklahoma	FCC (K231BH)
W229CT	93.7	Memphis	Tennessee	FCC (W229CT)
W264CO	100.7	Marion	Arkansas	FCC (W264CO)
W230AD	93.9	Gallatin	Tennessee	FCC (W230AD)
W258AD	100.7	Clarksville	Tennessee	FCC (W258AD)
W296DE	107.1	Donelson	Tennessee	FCC (W296DE)
K271CP	91.3	Paris	Texas	FCC (K217CP)
K233CZ	94.5	Jackson	Wyoming	FCC (K233CZ)
