= KTOK =

Radio station in Oklahoma City

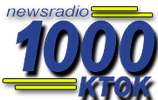
- Oklahoma City, Oklahoma; United States
- Broadcast area: Oklahoma City Metroplex
- Frequency: 1000 kHz
- Branding: NewsRadio 1000 KTOK

Programming
- Format: News/Talk
- Network: Fox News Radio
- Affiliations: Compass Media Networks; Premiere Networks; Westwood One

Ownership
- Owner: iHeartMedia, Inc.; (iHM Licenses, LLC)
- Sister stations: KGHM, KJYO, KOKQ, KTST, KXXY-FM

History
- First air date: January 27, 1927 (as KGFG)
- Former call signs: KGFG (1927–1937)
- Call sign meaning: "Talk Oklahoma"

Technical information
- Licensing authority: FCC
- Facility ID: 11925
- Class: B
- Power: 5,800 watts
- Transmitter coordinates: 35°21′29.2″N 97°27′49.1″W
- Repeater: 96.1 KXXY-FMHD2 (Oklahoma City)

Links
- Public license information: Public file; LMS
- Webcast: Listen Live
- Website: ktok.iheart.com

KTOK (1000 AM) is a commercial radio station in Oklahoma City and airs a news/talk format. It is owned by iHeartMedia, Inc., with the license held by iHM Licenses, LLC. KTOK and its sister stations, KGHM, KJYO, KOKQ, KTST and KXXY-FM, have offices and studios at 6525 North Meridian Avenue on the Northwest side of Oklahoma City.

KTOK's power is 5,800 watts. It uses a directional antenna with a three to five-tower array. Because AM 1000 is a clear channel frequency reserved for Class A WMVP in Chicago, KNWN in Seattle and XEOY in Mexico City, KTOK's nighttime signal must protect those stations. The transmitter is in Moore, Oklahoma, off NE 25th Street. KTOK programming is also heard on co-owned 96.1 KXXY's HD2 subchannel and on the iHeartRadio app.

== Programming ==
The weekday schedule is made up of nationally syndicated conservative talk shows, mostly from co-owned Premiere Networks. They include Your Morning Show with Michael DelGiorno, The Glenn Beck Program, The Clay Travis and Buck Sexton Show, The Sean Hannity Show, The Mark Levin Show, The Jesse Kelly Show, Our American Stories with Lee Habeeb and Coast to Coast AM with George Noory.

Weekends feature programs on money, health, home repair, real estate and guns. Some weekend shows are paid brokered programming. Syndicated weekend shows include At Home with Gary Sullivan, Rich DeMuro on Tech, Tom Gresham's Gun Talk, The Weekend with Michael Brown, Armstrong & Getty, Sunday Nights with Bill Cunningham and Bill Handel on the Law. Most hours begin with an update from Fox News Radio.

KTOK, along with the other iHeart stations in Oklahoma City, simulcasts audio of KFOR-TV if a tornado warning is issued within the Oklahoma City metro area. KFOR-TV channel 4 is Oklahoma City's NBC Network affiliate.

== History ==
=== Early years ===
KTOK was first licensed with the sequentially assigned callsign, KGFG, signing on the air on January 27, 1927. It was owned by the Full Gospel Church in Oklahoma City. By the 1930s, the station was owned by the Oklahoma Broadcasting Company. It broadcast on 1370 kilocycles with a power of 100 watts. KGFG's studios were housed in the Cotton Exchange Building.

The callsign changed to KTOK on February 17, 1937. With WKY as an NBC Red Network station and KOMA carrying the CBS Radio Network, KTOK first became a network affiliate of the Mutual Broadcasting System. By the 1940s, it had switched to the NBC Blue Network (later ABC).

=== 1940s and 50s ===
In 1941, with the enactment of the North American Regional Broadcasting Agreement (NARBA), KTOK moved to 1400 kHz. The power increased to 250 watts, but management wanted to make KTOK's signal competitive with 930 WKY (5,000 watts) and 1520 KOMA (50,000 watts).

In the late 1940s, KTOK got permission from the Federal Communications Commission to move to 1000 kHz. The power increased to 5,000 watts by day, 1,000 watts at night. The station also added an FM companion. KTOK-FM signed on in 1946 on 104.3 MHz. It mostly simulcast the AM station. However, management saw little hope in making KTOK-FM profitable and gave it up after several years.

By the 1950s, as network programming was moving from radio to television, KTOK switched to a full service, middle of the road (MOR) format of popular adult music, news and sports. As WKY and KOMA became youth-oriented Top 40 stations, KTOK began carrying sports from their former networks, NBC and CBS, including the World Series, championship fights and auto racing. An advertisement in the 1960 edition of the Broadcasting Yearbook said KTOK plays "toe-tapping music (no rock and roll) and all of the announcers are adults," to contrast KTOK with the youthful Top 40 disc jockeys on WKY and KOMA.

=== 1960s - 1980s ===
In the 1960s, the nighttime power increased to match the daytime power, 5,000 watts. But it had to use a complicated directional antenna system to make the higher nighttime power work, while still protecting other stations on AM 1000.

In 1973, KTOK was acquired by Covenant Broadcasting (later known as Insilco Broadcasting Group, a forerunner to Clear Channel Communications aka iHeartMedia), which also bought an FM station on 102.7, KZUE, which aired an adult contemporary music format. (102.7 today is Top 40/CHR KJYO.) KTOK became an affiliate of the ABC Information Radio Network.

KTOK gradually increased the talk programming and cut the MOR music programming. By the 1980s, it had become a talk station.

=== 1990s - Today ===
KTOK and its FM station were acquired in 1992 by San Antonio-based Clear Channel Communications (the forerunner to current owner iHeartMedia). At one time, the news staff numbered 12. iHeart moved its Oklahoma City operations to 50 Penn Place off Northwest Expressway and Interstate 44.

In the 2010s, the station got a slight power increase, going from 5,000 watts to 5,800 watts, day and night. It also got a simulcast on an HD Radio subchannel of co-owned KXXY-FM.

For much of the late 1990s and early 2000s, KTOK's studios and offices were in the 50 Penn Place building on the Northwest side. In early 2022, iHeartMedia Oklahoma City moved KTOK, along with sister stations KGHM, KJYO, KTST, KXXY-FM, KREF-FM (now KOKQ), to new state of the art studios at 6525 North Meridian Avenue. further up the road on the Northwest side, just a few miles west from their former studios.

== Current and former on-air staff ==
Show hosts:

- Dave Garrett (1987-1992 sportscaster & sports talk show host)
- Bob Durgin
- Dave Garrett (1986-1992 2006-2012 sports director)
