= WFCV (AM) =

Radio station in Fort Wayne, Indiana

- Fort Wayne, Indiana; United States
- Frequency: 1090 kHz

Programming
- Format: Christian
- Affiliations: Bott Radio Network

Ownership
- Owner: Bott Broadcasting Company

History
- First air date: 1968
- Former call signs: WFWR (1968–1980)

Technical information
- Licensing authority: FCC
- Facility ID: 6489
- Class: D
- Power: 2,500 watts day 1,000 watts critical hours
- Transmitter coordinates: 41°05′01″N 85°04′32″W

Links
- Public license information: Public file; LMS
- Webcast: Listen Live
- Website: WFCV Online

WFCV (1090 AM) is a radio station located in Fort Wayne, Indiana, United States. It is one of a network of stations owned and operated by the Bott Broadcasting Company.

WFCV broadcasts a Christian radio format as a member of the Bott Radio Network. The station was assigned the WFCV call sign by the Federal Communications Commission on May 2, 1980.

The station debuted in 1968 as WFWR with a middle of the road music format, which was changed in 1971 to become the market's first country music station. Following a sale in 1976, the country format was changed to easy listening music, which continued until 1980, when Bott Broadcasting purchased WFWR and changed the calls to WFCV.

== History of frequency ==
The 1090 kHz frequency in Fort Wayne was previously assigned to WFTW, which was a 1 kW daytime AM station owned by Fort Wayne Broadcasting, Incorporated. It began broadcasting August 10, 1947, with studios in the Purdue University Building, 220 E. Jefferson Street in Fort Wayne.
