= KREF (AM) =

Radio station in Norman–Oklahoma City, Oklahoma

- Norman, Oklahoma; United States
- Broadcast area: Oklahoma City Metroplex
- Frequency: 1400 kHz
- Branding: Sports Talk 1400 The Ref

Programming
- Format: Sports
- Affiliations: Fox Sports Radio

Ownership
- Owner: Metro Radio Group, LLC

History
- First air date: September 1, 1949
- Former call signs: KNOR (1949–2000)
- Call sign meaning: Referee

Technical information
- Licensing authority: FCC
- Facility ID: 22192
- Class: C
- Power: 1,000 watts unlimited
- Transmitter coordinates: 35°13′4″N 97°24′37″W
- Translator: 99.3 K257DA (Norman)

Links
- Public license information: Public file; LMS
- Webcast: Listen Live
- Website: kref.com

KREF (1400 kHz) is an AM radio station broadcasting a sports format. Licensed to Norman, Oklahoma, United States, the station serves the Oklahoma City area. The station is currently owned by Metro Radio Group, LLC, and carries programming from Fox Sports Radio. In addition, KREF was an affiliate of the Cleveland Browns Radio Network.

Former logo

== FM Translator ==
KREF is also broadcast on the following FM translator:

Broadcast translator for KREF
Call sign	Frequency	City of license	FID	ERP (W)	HAAT	Class	FCC info
K257DA	99.3 FM	Norman, Oklahoma	142044	250	89.1 m (292 ft)	D	LMS
