= 91.5 FM =

FM radio frequency

The following radio stations broadcast on FM frequency 91.5 MHz:

== Argentina ==
- APA Radio San Pedro in San Pedro, Buenos Aires
- Casares in Carlos Casares, Buenos Aires
- Center Zone in Piedra Buena, Santa Cruz
- de la Bahía in Bahía Blanca, Buenos Aires
- Emanuel in Tabay, Corrientes
- Esfera in El Maitén, Chubut
- Estacionline in Funes, Santa Fe
- Comunidad in Rosario, Santa Fe
- Gigante in La Rioja
- Irupé in La Plata, Buenos Aires
- La Bomba in Villa Mercedes, San Luis
- QSL in Mar del Plata, Buenos Aires
- Radioactividad in Corrientes
- Radio María in Charata, Chaco
- Radio María in Chajarí, Entre Ríos
- Radio Maria in Perico, Jujuy
- Radio María in San Javier, Misiones
- Radio María in Orán, Salta
- Radio María in Carlos Pellegrini, Santa Fe
- Radio María in Villa Ocampo, Santa Fe
- Sol in Santa Fe de la Vera Cruz, Santa Fe
- Tropical Latina in Pergamino, Buenos Aires

== Australia ==
- 2KY in Parkes, New South Wales
- Triple J in Grafton, New South Wales
- Darwin FM in Darwin, Northern Territory
- 5RM in Berri, South Australia
- 3PTV in Melbourne, Victoria

== Canada (Channel 218) ==
- CBAF-FM-3 in Campbellton, New Brunswick
- CBAX-FM in Halifax, Nova Scotia
- CBCO-FM in Orillia, Ontario
- CBGA-3-FM in Riviere-au-Renard, Quebec
- CBO-FM in Ottawa, Ontario
- CBU-3-FM in Pemberton, British Columbia
- CBVX-FM-2 in La Malbaie, Quebec
- CBXS-FM in Swan Hills, Alberta
- CBXZ-FM in Tofino, British Columbia
- CBYG-FM in Prince George, British Columbia
- CHLM-FM-1 in Amos/Val d'Or, Quebec
- CIWM-FM in Brandon, Manitoba
- CKBT-FM in Kitchener/Waterloo, Ontario
- CKBZ-FM-5 in Sun Peaks, British Columbia
- CKPR-FM in Thunder Bay, Ontario
- CKXR-FM in Salmon Arm, British Columbia
- CKXY-FM in Cochrane, Alberta
- VF2202 in Kemano, British Columbia
- VF2563 in Spences Bridge, British Columbia
- VF2572 in Ashcroft, British Columbia
- VF7159 in Vancouver, British Columbia
- VF8014 in Montmagny, Quebec

== China ==
- CNR The Voice of China in Benxi County
- CNR Business Radio in Luzhou
- CRI Easy FM in Beijing
- Zhuhai Music Radio Bai Dao Zhi Sheng in Zhuhai

== Israel ==
- Radio Kol Rega in Tiberias and the Jordan Valley

== Italy ==
- Rai Radio 1 Alto Adige in Bolzano

== Japan ==
- HBC Radio in Sapporo, Hokkaido
- RKB Radio in Kitakyushu, Fukuoka

== Malaysia ==
- IKIMfm in Klang Valley

== Mexico ==
- XHCCQ-FM in Cancún, Quintana Roo
- XHCMA-FM in Nejapa de Madero, Oaxaca
- XHDH-FM in Ciudad Acuña, Coahuila
- XHDRO-FM in San Pedro de las Colonias, Coahuila
- XHGEO-FM in Guadalajara, Jalisco
- XHJC-FM in Mexicali, Baja California
- XHMPJ-FM in San José del Cabo, Baja California Sur
- XHMRL-FM in Morelia, Michoacán
- XHPEBH-FM in León, Guanajuato
- XHSOA-FM in Caborca, Sonora
- XHTAC-FM in Tapachula, Chiapas
- XHTL-FM in Tuxpan, Veracruz
- XHYF-FM in Hermosillo, Sonora
- XHZTS-FM in Zacatecas, Zacatecas

== Philippines ==
- DWKY in Metro Manila
- DYHR in Cebu City
- DXKX in Davao City
- DWED in Legazpi City
- DXKZ in Zamboanga City

== Taiwan ==
- Free FM in Rende, Tainan
- Hit Fm in Taichung
- National Education Radio in Matsu
- Voice of Pacific in Yilan

== Trinidad and Tobago ==
- Mad FM

== United Kingdom ==
- BBC Radio 3
- BBC Radio Wales - Rhymney Transmitter

== United States (Channel 218) ==
- KAFH in Great Falls, Montana
- KAJX in Aspen, Colorado
- KALR in Hot Springs, Arkansas
- KANU (FM) in Lawrence, Kansas
- KARF in Independence, Kansas
- KASK in Fairfield, California
- KBAI (FM) in Bloomfield, Missouri
- KBAN in De Ridder, Louisiana
- KBCX in Big Spring, Texas
- KBLC in Fredericksburg, Texas
- KBSX in Boise, Idaho
- KBYR in Rexburg, Idaho
- KCAS in McCook, Texas
- KCBK in Frederick, Oklahoma
- KCFB in Saint Cloud, Minnesota
- KCMH (FM) in Mountain Home, Arkansas
- KDAN in Marshall, California
- KDCJ in Kermit, Texas
- KDKY in Marathon, Texas
- KDOB in Brookings, Oregon
- KEFL in Kirksville, Missouri
- KFBR in Gerlach, Nevada
- KFLQ in Albuquerque, New Mexico
- KGAC in Saint Peter, Minnesota
- KGHI in Westport, Washington
- KGRM in Grambling, Louisiana
- KHML in Madisonville, Texas
- KHVT in Bloomington, Texas
- KHYC in Scott City, Kansas
- KIOS in Omaha, Nebraska
- KIXV in Muleshoe, Texas
- KJWM in Grand Island, Nebraska
- KJZZ (FM) in Phoenix, Arizona
- KKUP in Cupertino, California
- KLHT-FM in Honolulu, Hawaii
- KLOP in Holy Cross, Alaska
- KLWS in Moses Lake, Washington
- KMOP in Garapan, Northern Marianas Islands
- KNCC (FM) in Elko, Nevada
- KNHM in Bayside, California
- KNPM in Miles City, Montana
- KNSM in Mason City, Iowa
- KNSU in Thibodaux, Louisiana
- KNWF in Fergus Falls, Minnesota
- KNWU in Forks, Washington
- KOPB in Portland, Oregon
- KPAE in Erwinville, Louisiana
- KPDE in Eden, Texas
- KPLG in Plains, Montana
- KPRJ in Jamestown, North Dakota
- KQCI in Freer, Texas
- KQMN in Thief River Falls, Minnesota
- KQXI in Granite Falls, Washington
- KRCC in Colorado Springs, Colorado
- KRNE-FM in Merriman, Nebraska
- KRQZ in Lompoc, California
- KRUX in Las Cruces, New Mexico
- KRVH in Rio Vista, California
- KRVP in Falfurrias, Texas
- KSIV in Saint Louis, Missouri
- KSJD in Cortez, Colorado
- KSJV in Fresno, California
- KSNB in Norton, Kansas
- KSNS in Medicine Lodge, Kansas
- KSQM in Sequim, Washington
- KSRS in Roseburg, Oregon
- KSUA in Fairbanks, Alaska
- KTXK in Texarkana, Texas
- KTXP in Bushland, Texas
- KUBS in Newport, Washington
- KUHC in Stratford, Texas
- KUNC in Greeley, Colorado
- KUNV in Las Vegas, Nevada
- KUSC in Los Angeles, California
- KUSU in Logan, Utah
- KUWD in Sundance, Wyoming
- KVAZ in Henryetta, Oklahoma
- KVHR in Van Horn, Texas
- KVYA in Cedarville, California
- KWLD in Plainview, Texas
- KWVZ in Florence, Oregon
- KYDS in Sacramento, California
- KYFA-FM in Ginger, Texas
- KYFB in Denison, Texas
- KZCF in Atwater, California
- KZNZ in Elkhart, Kansas
- KZYZ in Willits, California
- WAPN in Holly Hill, Florida
- WAVI in Oxford, Mississippi
- WBEZ in Chicago, Illinois
- WBFI in Mcdaniels, Kentucky
- WBIE in Delphos, Ohio
- WBIM in Bridgewater, Massachusetts
- WBJC in Baltimore, Maryland
- WBJD in Atlantic Beach, North Carolina
- WCDH in Shenandoah, Pennsylvania
- WCIC in Pekin, Illinois
- WCIE (FM) in New Port Richey, Florida
- WCNB in Dayton, Indiana
- WCVY in Coventry, Rhode Island
- WDBK in Blackwood, New Jersey
- WEBT in Langdale, Alabama
- WECI in Richmond, Indiana
- WEMY in Green Bay, Wisconsin
- WFHU in Henderson, Tennessee
- WFMQ in Lebanon, Tennessee
- WFSQ in Tallahassee, Florida
- WFWR in Attica, Indiana
- WGLY in Bolton, Vermont
- WGLZ in West Liberty, West Virginia
- WGPH in Vidalia, Georgia
- WGRE in Greencastle, Indiana
- WGRS in Guilford, Connecticut
- WGTT in Emeralda, Florida
- WGWM in Trevett, Maine
- WHCB in Bristol, Tennessee
- WHKC in Columbus, Ohio
- WICA in Traverse City, Michigan
- WJBP in Red Bank, Tennessee
- WJCY in Cicero, Indiana
- WJHS (FM) in Columbia City, Indiana
- WJLR in Seymour, Indiana
- WJOH in Raco, Michigan
- WJGS in Norwood, Georgia
- WJWA in Evansville, Indiana
- WJYO in Fort Myers, Florida
- WKCL in Ladson, South Carolina
- WKHR in Bainbridge, Ohio
- WKRJ in New Philadelphia, Ohio
- WKWM in Marathon, Florida
- WLGQ in Gadsden, Alabama
- WLHW in Casey, Illinois
- WLRK in Greenville, Mississippi
- WLUR in Lexington, Virginia
- WMFO in Medford, Massachusetts
- WMHC in South Hadley, Massachusetts
- WMHW in Mount Pleasant, Michigan
- WMIE in Cocoa, Florida
- WMLN in Milton, Massachusetts
- WNIQ in Sterling, Illinois
- WNRZ in Dickson, Tennessee
- WNYE (FM) in New York, New York
- WOBC in Oberlin, Ohio
- WOOL (FM) in Bellows Falls, Vermont
- WOSP (FM) in Portsmouth, Ohio
- WPAU in Palmyra Township, Pennsylvania
- WPIN in Dublin, Virginia
- WPJW in Hurricane, West Virginia
- WPRK in Winter Park, Florida
- WPSF in Clewiston, Florida
- WPSU (FM) in State College, Pennsylvania
- WRBC in Lewiston, Maine
- WRFJ in Fort Mill, South Carolina
- WRFT in Indianapolis, Indiana
- WRPI in Troy, New York
- WRSG in Middlebourne, West Virginia
- WSDH in Sandwich, Massachusetts
- WSJQ in Pascoag, Rhode Island
- WSQX in Binghamton, New York
- WSRN in Swarthmore, Pennsylvania
- WSTF (FM) in Andalusia, Alabama
- WTBH in Chiefland, Florida
- WTBI in Greenville, South Carolina
- WTML in Tullahoma, Tennessee
- WTUL in New Orleans, Louisiana
- WTYG in Sparr, Florida
- WUAL in Tuscaloosa, Alabama
- WUMF in Farmington, Maine
- WUML in Lowell, Massachusetts
- WUMZ in Gloucester, Massachusetts
- WUNC (FM) in Chapel Hill, North Carolina
- WUPX (FM) in Marquette, Michigan
- WVAV in Vicksburg, Michigan
- WVCM in Iron Mountain, Michigan
- WVCT in Keavy, Kentucky
- WVHC in Herkimer, New York
- WVLR-FM in Lyndonville, Vermont
- WVMV in China Township, Michigan
- WVOI in Everglades City, Florida
- WWEV-FM in Cumming, Georgia
- WWLN in Lincoln, Maine
- WXXO in Rochester, New York
- WYCS in Yorktown, Virginia
- WZLY in Wellesley, Massachusetts
