= Paul Bush =

Paul Bush may refer to:

- Paul Bush (filmmaker) (1956–2023), British experimental film director and animator
- Paul Bush (Royal Navy officer) (1855–1930)
- Paul Bush (bishop) (1490–1558), English Augustinian and first bishop of Bristol
- Paul Bush (sports administrator), chair of Commonwealth Games Scotland
