= XHTL-FM =

XHTL-FM may refer to:

- XHTL-FM (San Luis Potosí), Mix 99.3 FM
- XHTL-FM (Veracruz), Radio Ola 91.5 FM and 1390 AM
