= WEBT (disambiguation) =

WEBT (91.5 FM) is a radio station licensed to serve Langdale, Alabama, U.S.

WEBT may also refer to:

- Whole Earth Blazar Telescope, an astronomy project
- Webtrends, a company whose NASDAQ stock symbol was WEBT
