= Pennco Tech =

Coordinates: 40.09780°N 74.87105°W

- Motto: Turning Dreams Into Reality Since 1973
- Type: Private for-profit technical school
- Established: 1973
- Academic staff: 29
- Students: 700
- Location: Bristol and Blackwood, United States
- Website: www.penncotech.edu/

Pennco Tech is a private for-profit technical school in Bristol, Pennsylvania, and Blackwood, New Jersey. It was founded in 1973.

== Academics ==
Pennco Tech awards certificates and diplomas in healthcare and technology fields. At Pennco Tech, all programs and areas of study have local advisory boards composed of industry business personnel assembled to make sure curriculum encompasses real-world need and experience. The school is accredited by the Accrediting Commission of Career Schools and Colleges of Technology.

== Campuses ==
=== Pennco Tech Bristol Campus ===
Pennco Tech's Bristol, Pennsylvania, campus is located at 3815 Otter St, Bristol, PA 19007. The Pennco Tech Bristol campus offers a plumbing and heating curriculum not available at Pennco Tech's Blackwood campus.

=== Pennco Tech Blackwood Campus ===
Pennco Tech's Blackwood, New Jersey, campus is located at 99 Erial Rd, Blackwood, NJ 08012. The Pennco Tech Blackwood campus offers Diesel/Truck Technology curriculum not available at Pennco Tech's Bristol campus.
