= Paul Bush (filmmaker) =

British filmmaker (1956–2023)

Paul Bush (2 February 1956 – 17 August 2023) was a British experimental film director and animator.

== Life and career ==
Bush was born in London in 1956. The son of classical composer Geoffrey Bush, he studied Fine Art at Goldsmiths College under Michael Craig-Martin. He later taught himself how to make films while a member of the London Film-Makers' Co-op. He made numerous short and medium length films including The Cows Drama (1984), His Comedy (1994), Rumour of True Things (1996), Furniture Poetry (1999), While Darwin Sleeps (2004), and many others. He won prizes at animation festivals in the Netherlands, Barcelona, Zagreb, Hiroshima, Bombay, Chicago and other places throughout the world. His website contains extracts of many of his films.

In addition to directing and animating, Bush pioneered a technique seen in a number of his films, including The Albatross. The technique involves scratching frame by frame directly into the surface of colour filmstock over live action footage, creating an animated sequence which resembles traditional wood engraving. From 2002 Bush increasingly focused on time lapse portraits of people and more conventional animation including a collaboration with artist Lisa Milroy which produced Geisha Grooming (2003).

Between 1981 and 1993, Bush also taught film-making, established a film workshop in South London, and supervised a wide variety of courses and the production of numerous student films. Between 1995 and 2001 he taught on the visual arts course at Goldsmiths. Bush lectured, ran workshops and tutored at numerous art and film courses around the world including:

- Media Academy of Cologne
- National Film Board of Canada
- The Netherlands Institute of Animation Films
- CalArts
- Centro Sperimentale di Cinematografia
- St. Lukas in Brussels
- KASK in Ghent
- Anadolou University in Turkey
- Hochschule Luzern - Design & Kunst
- Royal College of Art
- Duncan of Jordanstone College of Art and Design
- National Film and Television School (NFTS)
- CineToro Film Festival

Bush taught at HGK Lucerne and the NFTS. He lived in London and had two children. On 17 August 2023, he died in a motorcycle accident in Wales. He was 67.
