= XHDH-FM =

Radio station in Ciudad Acuña, Coahuila, Mexico

- Ciudad Acuña, Coahuila; Mexico
- Frequency: 91.5 FM
- Branding: Exa FM

Programming
- Format: Spanish & English Top 40 (CHR)
- Affiliations: MVS Radio

Ownership
- Owner: Nova Teleradio, S.A. de C.V.
- Operator: Grupo Región

History
- First air date: January 13, 1938
- Former call signs: XEDH-AM
- Former frequencies: 1340 AM

Technical information
- Licensing authority: CRT
- Class: AA
- ERP: 6 kW
- HAAT: 41.49 m (136.1 ft)
- Transmitter coordinates: 29°18′49″N 100°57′01.45″W

Links
- Webcast: Listen live
- Website: exafm.com

XHDH-FM is a radio station in Ciudad Acuña, Coahuila, Mexico. Broadcasting on 91.5 FM, XHDH carries the Exa FM format from MVS Radio.

== History ==
The station began as XEDH-AM 1340, with a concession awarded to Vicente Hernández on January 13, 1938. In 1949, the station was sold to Óscar González Galindo, and in January 1987, it became part of Grupo RCG with its concession owned by Roberto Casimiro González Treviño.

In the late 2000s, XHDH was sold to Nova Teleradio. In 2012, it migrated to FM on 91.5 MHz.

In September 2021, Grupo Región began operating the station; it rebranded as "Región 91.5 Exa FM" with no change in format.
