= XHMRL-FM =

Radio station in Morelia, Michoacán, Mexico

- Morelia, Michoacán; Mexico
- Frequency: 91.5 MHz
- Branding: 91.5 FM

Programming
- Format: Adult contemporary

Ownership
- Owner: José Humberto and Loucille Martínez Morales (Grupo MarMor)

History
- First air date: July 14, 1975 (concession)
- Former call signs: XHKW-FM (1975–199?)
- Call sign meaning: "Morelia"

Technical information
- ERP: 100 kW

Links
- Webcast: Listen live
- Website: 915fmradio.mx

XHMRL-FM is a radio station in Morelia, Michoacán, Mexico. Broadcasting on 91.5 FM, XHMRL is owned by Grupo MarMor and carries an AC format known as 91.5 FM.

== History ==
The station's concession was awarded in 1975 as XHKW-FM and has remained in the Martínez family. Known as KW Música para un Auditorio Selecto, during the early 1990s its callsign was changed to XHMRL-FM and renamed to MORELIA STEREO 91.5.

In 2002 the station was renamed to Max FM, and from January 2011 to April 2014 it was the local outlet of Exa FM. The Top FM name was instituted on April 28, 2014. Since March 2018 it is identified only as "91.5 FM" with an adult contemporary format.
