= KRNM =

NPR radio station in Saipan, Northern Mariana Islands

Saipan, Northern Mariana Islands; United States
- Frequency: 88.1 MHz

Programming
- Format: Public
- Affiliations: National Public Radio

Ownership
- Owner: Marianas Educational Media Services, Inc.
- Sister stations: KCKD, KVPP, KMOP

History
- Call sign meaning: Radio North Marina

Technical information
- Licensing authority: FCC
- Facility ID: 49570
- Class: A
- ERP: 1,800 watts
- HAAT: 38 meters (125 feet)
- Transmitter coordinates: 15°9′5″N 145°43′11″E

Links
- Public license information: Public file; LMS

KRNM (88.1 FM), is a National Public Radio-affiliated non-commercial educational radio station run by Marianas Educational Media Services, Inc., in Saipan, Northern Mariana Islands. It primarily features National Public Radio programming. Its studios are located inside the Marianas Variety Building on Alaihai Avenue in Garapan, and its transmitter is located on Husk Lane in the southwestern section of the island of Finasisu, near the Chalan Kanoa district.

The station was assigned the KRNM call letters by the Federal Communications Commission (FCC) on February 19, 1996.

This station was previously owned and operated by the Northern Marianas College (NMC). The FCC granted NMC a license to broadcast non-commercial public radio programming on KRNM, 88.1 FM on February 2, 1998.

== Former translators ==
At some point in the past, KRNM also operated a translator on 89.1 FM, K206BM. This was switched to relaying Guam's KPRG at an unknown date.

Call sign	Frequency	City of license	FID	ERP (W)	Class	FCC info
K206BM	89.1 FM	Saipan, MP		250	D	
