= Camden County College =

Community college in Camden County, New Jersey, US

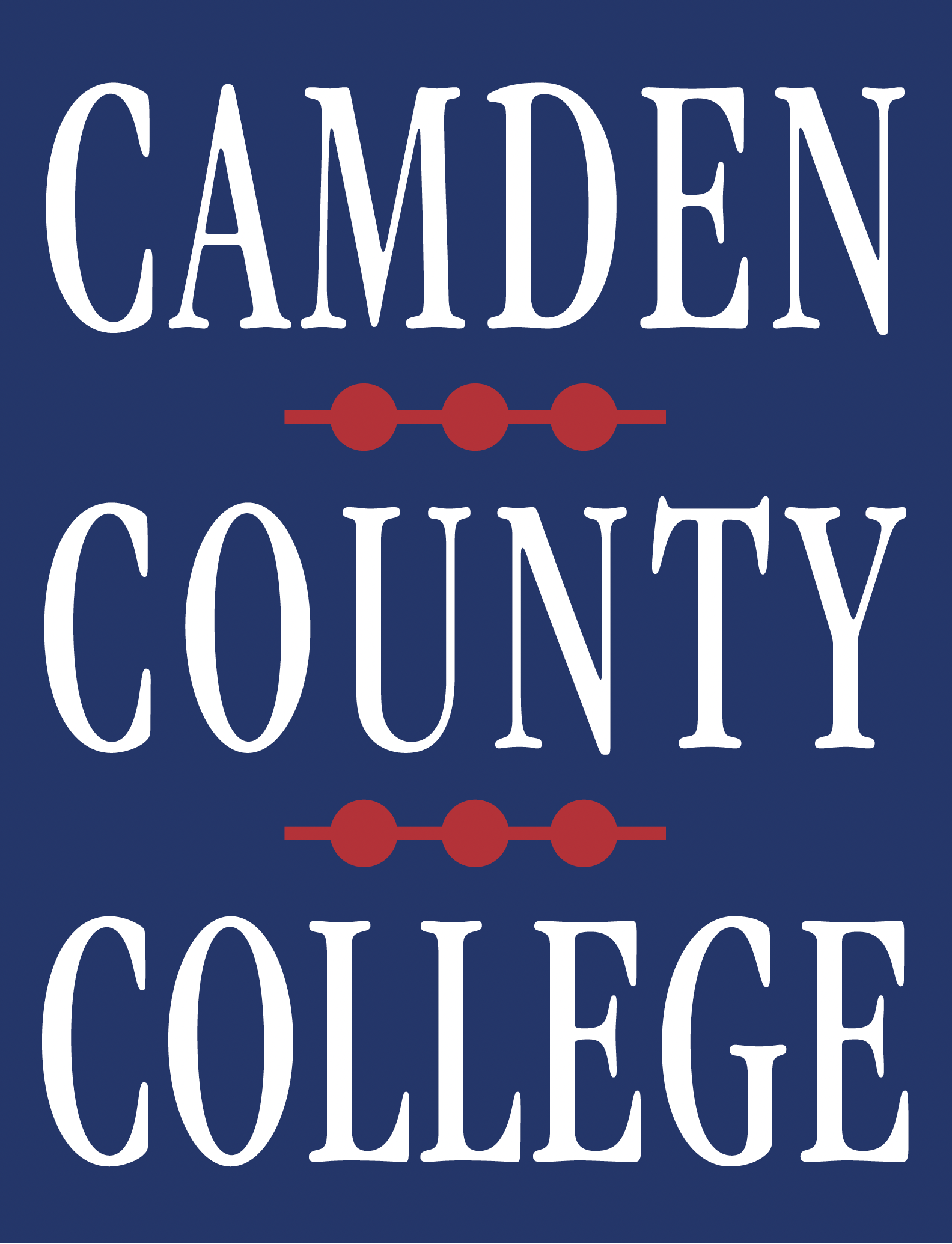
- Type: Public community college
- Established: 1967
- President: Lovell Pugh-Bassett
- Faculty: 106
- Administrative staff: 345
- Students: 11,000 (2016–17)
- Location: Blackwood, New Jersey, United States; 39.785°N 75.039°W
- Nicknames: Cougars, Lady Cougars
- Sporting affiliations: Division III, NJCAA Region XIX and the Garden State Athletic Conference
- Website: www.camdencc.edu

Camden County College (CCC) is a public community college in Camden County, New Jersey. Camden County College has its main campus in the Blackwood section of Gloucester Township, with satellite locations in Camden, Cherry Hill and Sicklerville. The college offers Associate in Arts, Associate in Science, and Associate in Applied Science degree programs and certificate programs.

== History ==
Mother of the Savior Seminary campus in the 1960s. Wilson Hall in the center, Old Roosevelt Hall on the left (vertical) and Jefferson Hall on the right (vertical)

In 1962, a New Jersey State law enabled the establishment of colleges by counties. Camden County created a college board in 1964 and a voter referendum, in 1965, approved the creation of a county college. In 1966, the Freeholders of Camden County charged Harry Benn, then secretary of the Camden County College Board, and a small commission to find land capable of maintaining a college in the central part of the county. The Salvatorian Fathers, who ran the Mother of the Savior Seminary, were looking to sell the land and close down the facility. Camden County College was established in 1967 on 320 acres (1.3 km^{2}) of land which had belonged to the Mother of the Savior Seminary.

The only surviving seminary building, Jefferson Hall, is used by Rutgers University's School of Health Professionals. Jefferson hall survived due its architecture, The Three buildings form a "U" shape with a small central courtyard. The 1969 graduation commencement took place in the courtyard of the three major buildings. Currently, a small memorial to the Mother of the Savior Seminary resides in that courtyard. In 1967, Wilson Hall served as an administrative center, library, cafeteria and activity room. Jefferson Hall served as the main Science Building. Originally, there was a pond and creek on campus which later included a series of waterfalls, lounge beaches, and pedestrian walks.

Otto R. Mauke was chosen to be the first president of the college in March 1967 and his staff moved into Washington Hall in June 1967. First Day of classes for the college was on September 25, 1967, only six months from the founding of the college.

== Development ==
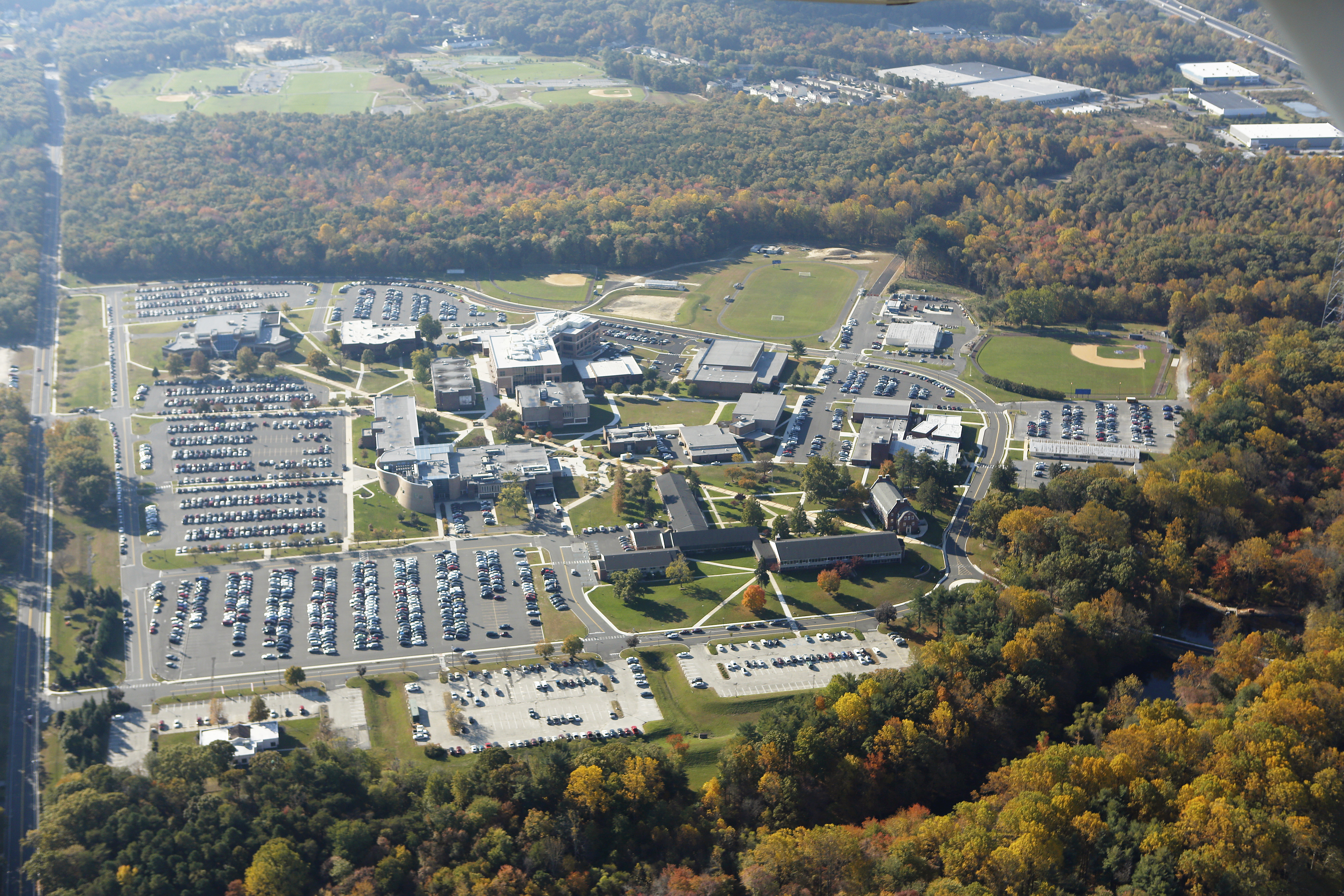
Aerial Photograph Camden County College in Blackwood, 2013

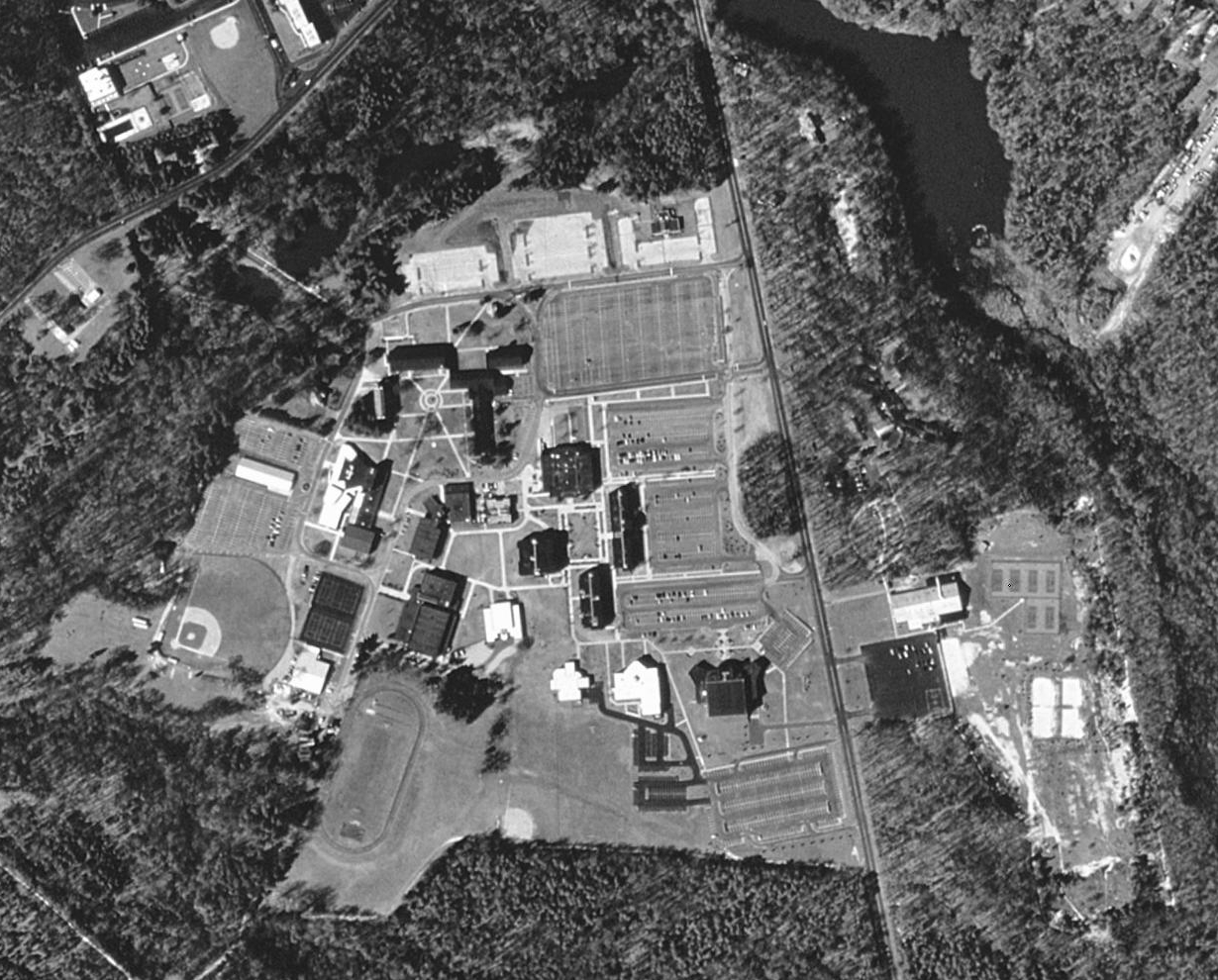
Aerial View of Camden County College in 1995

Jefferson Hall, on the Blackwood Campus of Camden County College

Founded in 1967, Camden County College was composed of one campus with seven academic programs and a handful of buildings. Three original buildings are still in use. The original enrollment was less than 500 students. In 1969, the college opened its first campus in Camden City. In 1970, the college began its first multimillion-dollar expansion. The nine million dollar (1969 dollars) $58,857,302.45 in (2016 dollars) project constructed new buildings, all of which are still in use, including Madison Hall, Taft Hall, Wolverton Library, the Community Center, the Papiano Gymnasium, and Truman Hall.

During the 1970s, the Blackwood campus added several more buildings and programs. The Camden City campus moved several times to larger locations.

In 1989, the Blackwood campus underwent another round of expansion. The college added a manufacturing technology building, a Laser Institute building, and a Child Care center. Also in 1989 a new campus, a multistory tower, began construction in Camden City.

In 2000, the Rohrer Center was opened in Cherry Hill, NJ, creating the third campus for the college. In 2004, a second building was added to the Camden City Campus. In 2005, the county made an $83 million investment ($103,913,755 in 2016 dollars) known as the Freeholder Initiative, in order to update and renovate the college campuses, representing the largest investment in the college since its founding. Since 2005 renovation has modernized the Blackwood campus. A "ring road" was constructed to allow for better traffic flow and parking, Madison Hall was renovated to allow for modern technology and equipment, the Madison Connector was built as a public space, a new science building was constructed, Taft Hall was renovated, and new "green" initiatives were started in order to make the campus more energy efficient.

In 2011, The Technical Institute of Camden County and the Regional Emergency Training Center were incorporated into the college, bringing all of Camden County's educational services under one organization.

In the fall 2014 Taft Hall became the main student registration and advisement center and was named the Louis Cappelli Student One Stop.

In 1967 the college began with less than 500 students. The first graduating class was 172 students in 1969. Enrollment expanded, by 2011, to over 15,000 students and 1,800 graduates.

=== Presidents ===
==== Lovell Pugh-Bassett ====
Dr. Lovell Pugh-Bassett is the current president of the college. She became the sixth president of Camden County College on July 1, 2022. Dr. Pugh-Bassett previously served as the Vice President of Institutional Effectiveness, Advancement, and Strategic Initiatives at the college since 2021. This marked her return to higher education after 20 years with the New Jersey Department of Education (NJDOE), having served in a number of capacities culminating in the role of Camden County Executive County Superintendent of Schools. Dr. Pugh-Bassett's professional introduction to education began in higher education where she served as an instructor and program coordinator for the Math/Science Upward Bound Program at Temple University. After years with Temple, she served as the program director for Upward Bound at the Community College of Philadelphia and transitioned to her work in K-12 at the NJDOE.

==== Donald Borden ====
Donald Borden served as president of the college from 2016 to 2022. He previously served as superintendent of the Audubon Public School District in Camden County from 2006 to 2013. During his tenure, the district solidified their financial footing while increasing diversity through the implementation of the school-choice program. In addition, his entrepreneurial approach to leadership led to creating partnerships with a number of organizations that increased the district's revenue. He also reorganized the district which led to greater fiscal efficiency and improvement of the delivery of support services while maintaining research based class sizes. During his time as superintendent, Mr. Borden served as an officer of the Camden County Superintendent's Roundtable.

==== Raymond Yannuzzi ====
Raymond Yannuzzi served as president of the college from 2006 to 2016. He was hired as Vice President of Academic Affairs in 2000 and became president of the college in 2006. The New Jersey Council of County Colleges honored Dr. Yannuzzi with a 2005 Community College Spirit Award in recognition of his exemplary service to the state's community colleges. He was cited for his leadership in developing the New Jersey Pathways Leading Apprentices to College Education Program, which connects registered apprenticeships in building/construction trades to college degree programs. Also acknowledged were his instrumental role in forming the Shipyard College Consortium of Philadelphia-area colleges, which helped bring commercial shipbuilding and other economic development activities to the Philadelphia Naval Shipyard. During his presidency the school has expanded its online classes and partnered with WHYY Public Television Philadelphia in order to share content. Dr. Yannuzzi has also served on the advisory councils of the Rowan University College of Education and the New Jersey Italian and Italian American Heritage Commission.

==== Phyllis Della Vecchia ====
Phyllis Della Vecchia served as president of the college from 1993 to 2006. During her presidency Camden County College built a third campus in Cherry Hill, New Jersey. The Camden city campus was expanded to include the Camden Technology Center. During her tenure the campus attained rankings as one of the larger community colleges in the country being in the top 100 in growth, enrollment and degrees granted.

==== Robert W. Ramsay ====
Robert W. Ramsay served as president of Camden County College from 1987 to 1993. During his tenure the college built a new campus in Camden city at Cooper and Broadway. He also expanded the technical facilities at the main campus located in Blackwood, New Jersey. A dedicated Criminal Justice Center was built as was the Laser Institute of Technology and the Helen Fuld School of Nursing.

==== Otto R. Mauke ====
The first president of Camden County College was Otto R. Mauke who served from 1967 until 1987. He was named President Emeritus and, in 2009, the college union was renamed the Otto R. Mauke Community Center. During his tenure the college grew from 500 students in 1967 to 8,000 students. He was an important part in expanding Camden County College into Camden City and extending college credit classes to pre-college students. He died in 2009. Currently, there are two display cases of personal-professional affects including a poem writing by a student, two gift pen sets (the first given in 1967 with the opening of the school the second presented on his final day and set to May 8, 1987) and a diorama of his office designed by Camden County College employee Sharon Yancey.

In 2010, Leah Mauke contributed $50,000 to start a scholarship endowment in honor of Dr. Mauke. The endowment represents the largest individual donation to Camden County College.

== Campuses ==
=== Main campus in Blackwood ===
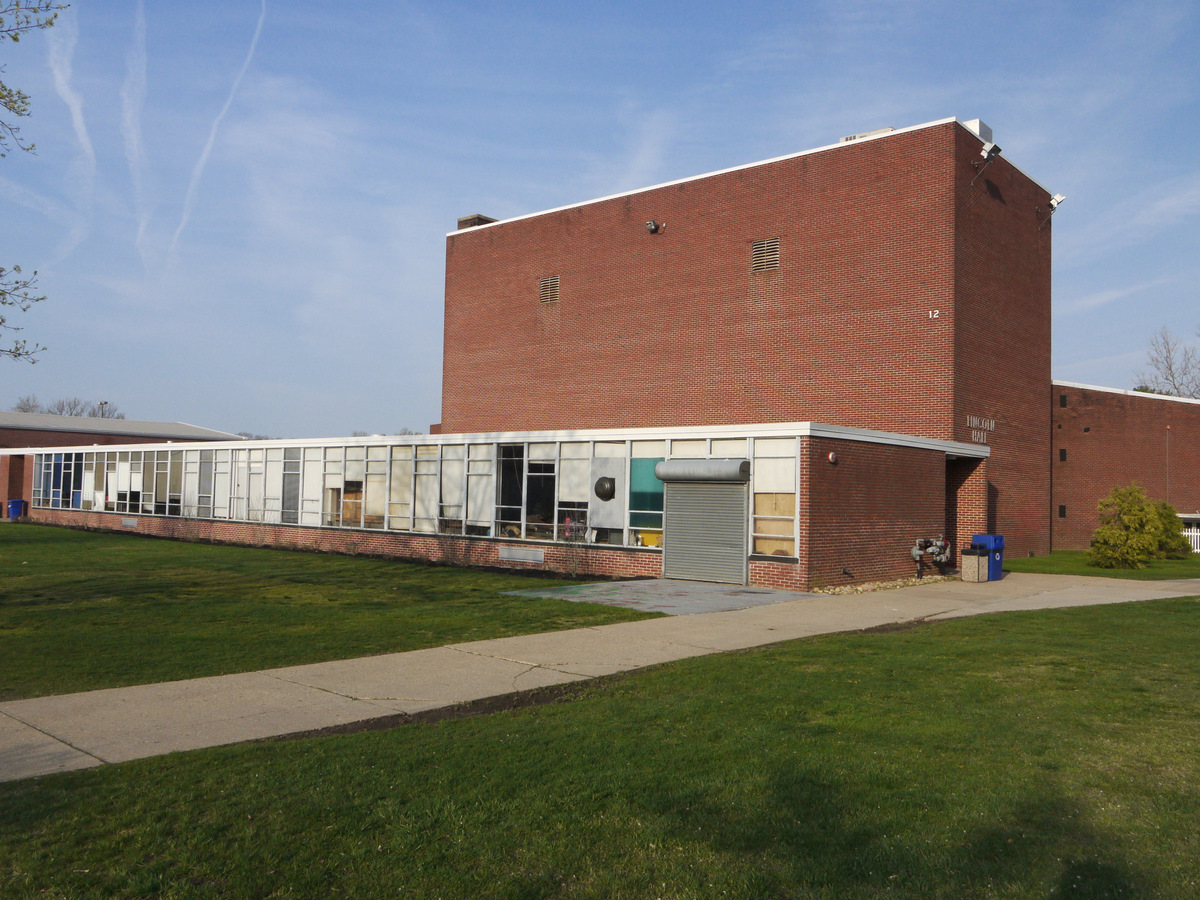
Lincoln Hall at Camden County College. The main arts building on campus it also includes the Dennis Flyer Theater.

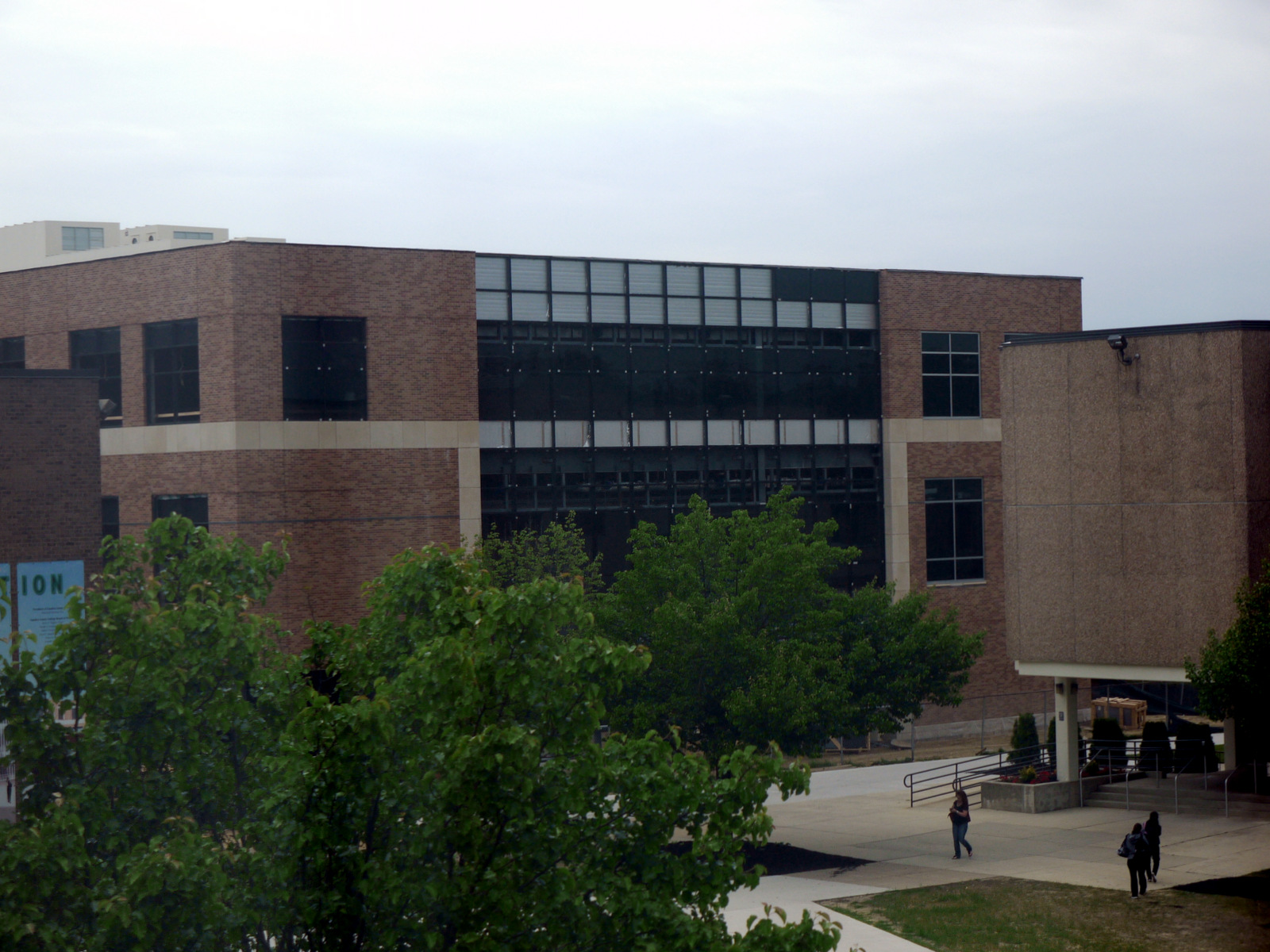
Roosevelt Hall main administrative building at Camden County College.

The Main Academic Campus of Camden County College is located in Blackwood, New Jersey. It was founded in 1967 on land formerly belonging to the Mother of the Savior Seminary. The campus currently contains about twenty (20) academic buildings.

The main academic buildings include:

- Madison Hall for liberal arts, cafeteria and community center
- Taft Hall for academic advisement, registration, computer lab and ESL and basic skills classes
- The Gabriel E. Danch CIM Center for engineering, fabrication, computer graphics and film production
- Lincoln Hall (which contains the Dennis Flyer Theater) for fine, performing and communication arts
- Jefferson Hall closed for renovations, bought by Rutgers in late 2016/early 2017
- Roosevelt Hall for administration
- Truman Hall for automotive studies, speech and basic math
- Adams Hall for wrestling

==== Wolverton Library ====
The Wolverton Library is a mixed-use four-story building. It consists of the traditional library facility and a computerized testing center, student study areas including quiet rooms for group study, ERIC has hold of the third and some of the second-floor space. The facility also hosts several areas for committee and conference discussions.

The Wolverton Library contains over 40,000 volumes and print journals covering three floors of the building. Students and staff have access to the county library system, which allows access to any volume in the Camden County public library system. The Wolverton Library also provides access to an extensive online e-book collection of over 100,000 volumes and research journals. Through the CollegeAnywhere system students also have access to hundreds of hours of educational video services including PBS documentaries. The library also maintains subscriptions to over thirty five popular and academic magazines.

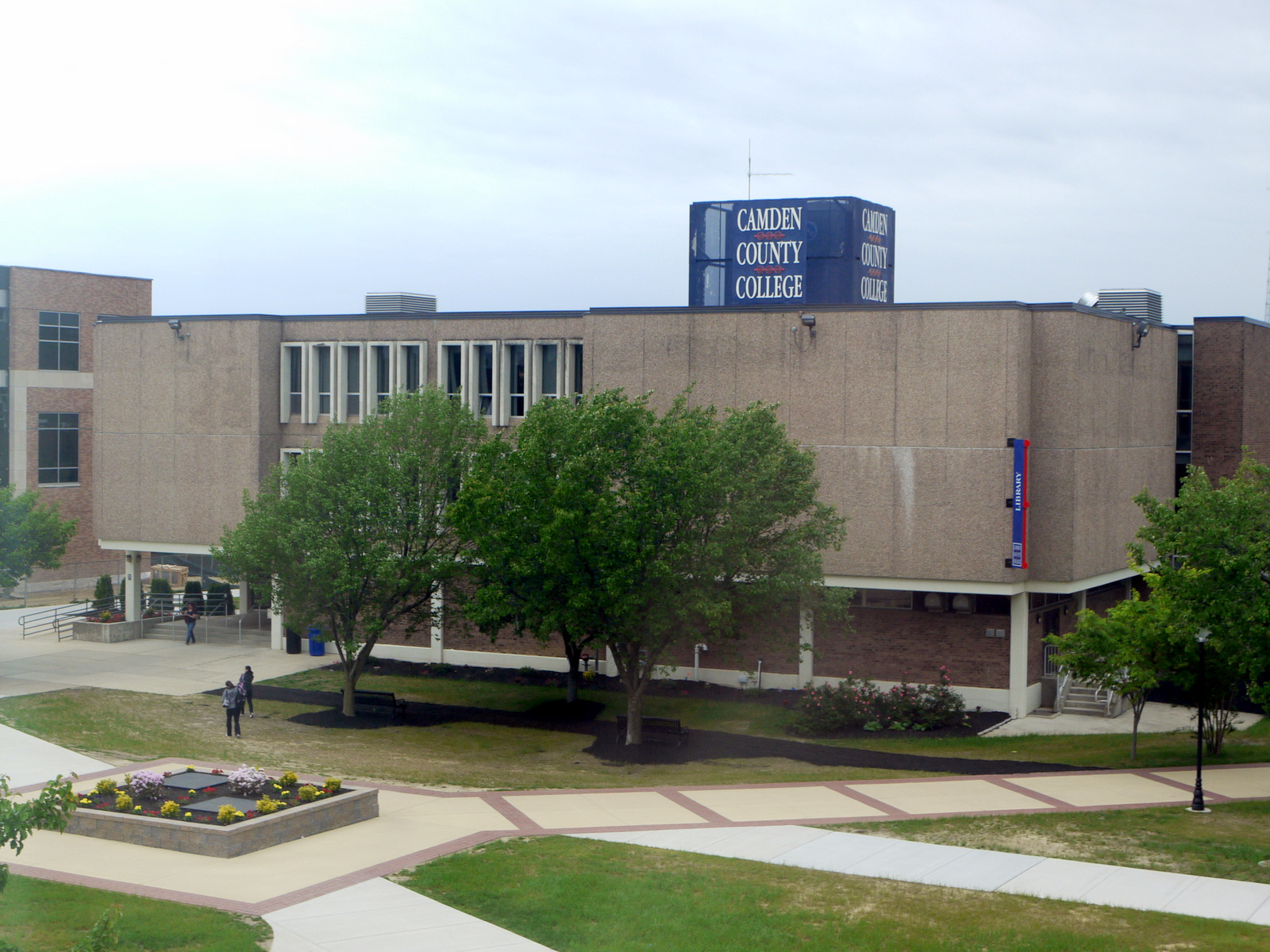
Wolverton Library, May 2012

==== Recent additions ====
- Madison Connector Building

The Madison Connector Building is a construction project begun simultaneously with the renovation of Madison Hall. The Connector is a three story breezeway-office-classroom facility linking Madison Hall with the College Community Center. It features a dramatic curved exterior. The building is 32,000 square feet (3,000 m^{2}) and represented the first new construction on campus since the building of the CIM in the early/mid 1990s. Madison Connector contains a lecture theater, an amphitheater, high-tech classrooms and office spaces."smart" technologies fill the building, providing state-of-the-art wireless and hard-wired teaching spaces and presentation capabilities. The most visually appealing part of the Madison Connector is the Atrium; a three story open space paneled, on three sides, by tall glass walls allowing the Atrium to be sunlit throughout the day. As such, it has become the gathering space for students. Construction was begun in 2005 and completed in Fall of 2008.

The Madison Connector building houses Civic Hall and The Forum – two high-technology meeting/conference/lecture spaces which serve as the hub for the presentations given by the Center for Civic Leadership and Responsibility. Civic Hall is a 315 stadium seat lecture hall containing a full presentation room in the back and multiple cameras and projectors. The Forum is a 40-seat amphitheater built to be reminiscent of both the Roman Forum and Medieval Observation Classrooms. The Forum is also outfitted with modern presentation equipment.

- Kevin G. Halpern Hall for Science and Health Education

This science building is a $30 million capital project. It had its groundbreaking on October 26, 2010 and had its dedication on April 12, 2013. College President Raymond Yannuzzi gave the opening remarks and was followed by honored guests including several members of the Camden County Board of Freeholders and the College Board of Trustees and other guests including U.S. Representative Robert E. Andrews, D-NJ, and New Jersey State Senator Donald Norcross. Also attending and giving brief remarks were Camden County Freeholder Director Louis Cappelli Jr, Freeholder Jeffrey L. Nash, Freeholder Ian K. Leonard, Gloucester Township Mayor David R. Mayer, and CCC trustee chair Kevin G. Halpern.

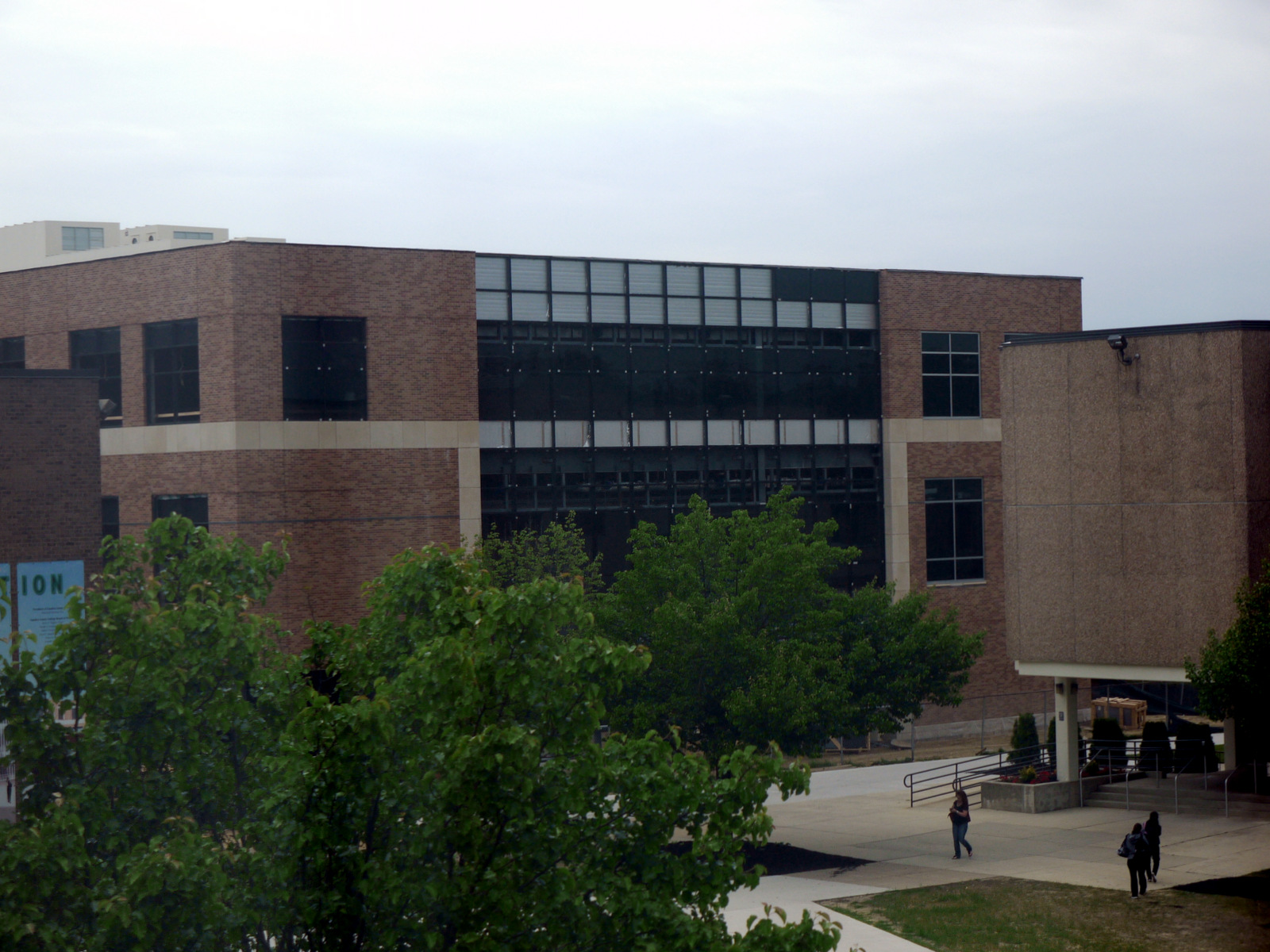
New Science Building under construction, May 2012

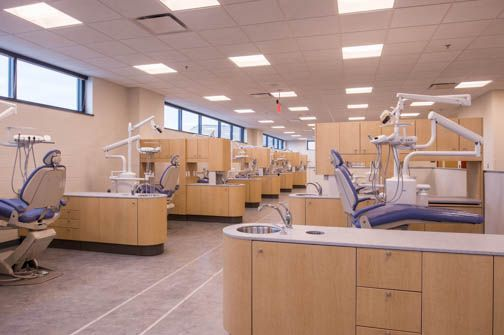
Dental Suite Halpern Hall Camden County College

The Science Building includes: three floors and 107,000 square feet (9,900 m^{2}) of classroom, office and lab space, ten Biology Laboratories, six Chemistry Laboratories, Medical Technology Laboratory, Veterinary Technology Laboratory, Surgical Suite for Surgical Technology Program, Twenty seven classrooms and lecture halls, a demonstration kitchen and student run cafe for the Hospitality and Nutrition Program, and an expansion of the Dental Hygiene Clinic allowing for low cost dental examinations for the general public. The Building is named after Kevin Halpern, the chairman for the Camden County College Board of Trustees from 1996 until his death in September 2012.

=== Camden City Campus, Camden Technology Center ===
Located in Camden City at the nexus of Broadway and Cooper Street, Camden County College has built two facilities. Camden County College opened a campus in Camden City in 1969 when it created an evening program for citizens who had not finished high school. In 1970 a new set of classrooms and offices was opened at Carmen Street in Camden City. In 1973, the Camden City campus expanded to a new building at 319 Cooper Street. In 1978, the Camden City campus expanded again through a move to a new facility located at Seventh and Cooper streets. This remained the location of the city campus until 1991 when the campus was moved to its current location, at the corner of Broadway and Cooper streets, and is known as College Hall.

College Hall is a five-story, fifty thousand sq. foot building. It houses liberal arts classrooms, an art room, a science laboratory, a child care center, computer rooms, and offices for student services.

In 2004, the Camden Technology Center (CTC) opened across the street from College Hall. The CTC is a US$19.6 million, 278,000-square-foot (25,800 m^{2}) facility built as part of the Camden Rehabilitation and Economic Recovery Act. The purpose of the facility is to create a space for the teaching and learning of technology-driven careers in health, business and technology fields. Amenities include technologically "smart" learning spaces, an "electronic village" computer lab, fully wired conference rooms, a 621-space parking garage and a University District Bookstore. The 13,500-square-foot (1,250 m^{2}) bookstore is open to the public, includes an internet cafe, and services the book requirements of the schools in the Camden University District including Rutgers–Camden and Rowan University.

The Camden City campus services more than two thousand students per semester – about 14% of the Camden County College student population.

Students and faculty at the Camden City Campus have access to the Paul Robeson Library at Rutgers University-Camden.

=== William G. Rohrer Campus in Cherry Hill ===
The Rohrer Campus is Camden County College's third campus location. The two-story building is located at the corner of Route 70 and Springdale Road in Cherry Hill, New Jersey on an 11-acre (45,000 m^{2}) site. In 1997 the Rohrer Charitable Foundation awarded a million dollar grant to the college in order to build an advanced technology training campus for Continuing Education students. The campus opened on April 19, 2000.

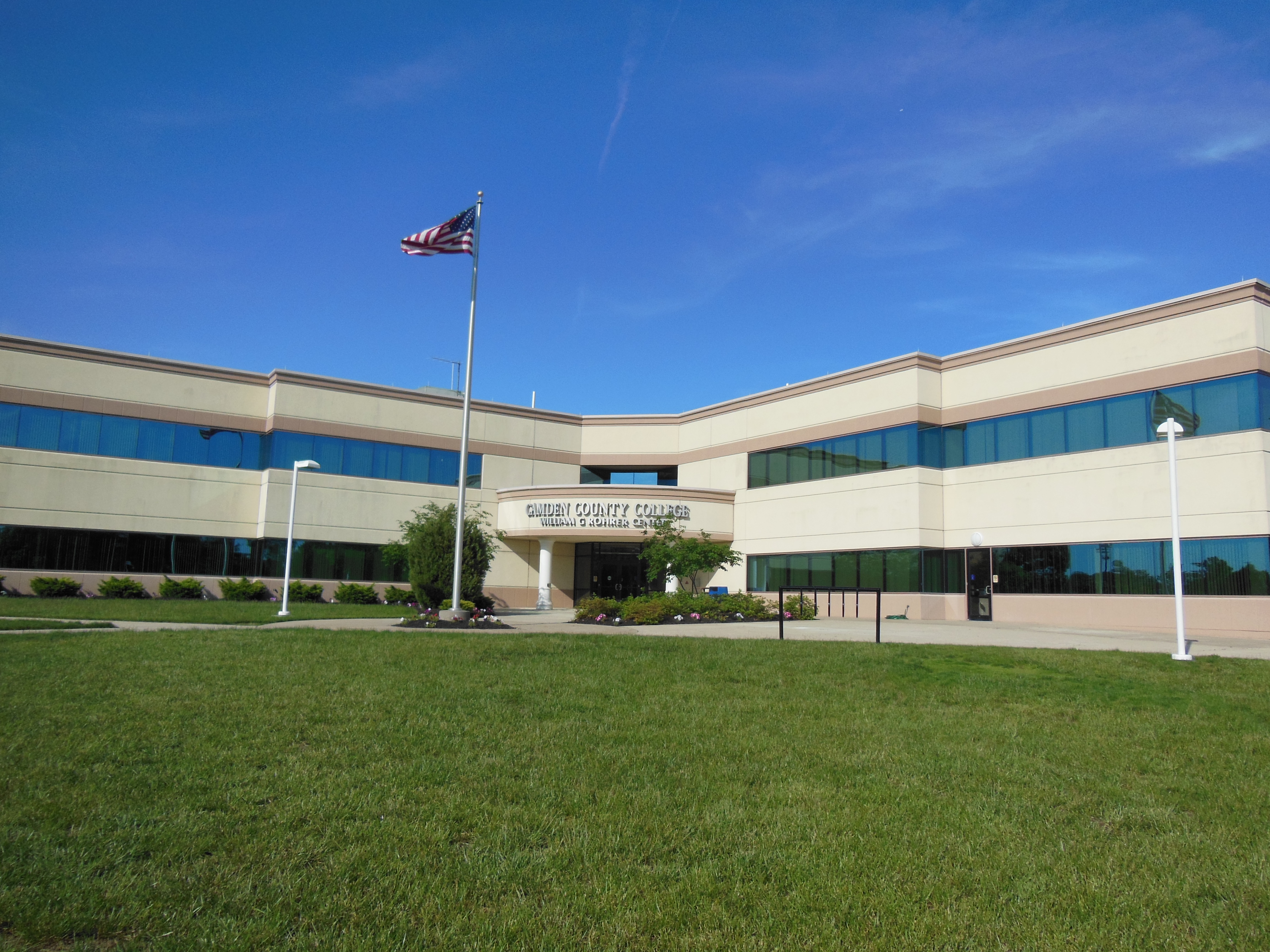
Rohrer Campus, Main Building, May 2012

The campus provides a high-tech learning environment. A high proportion of classrooms are computer labs, the entire campus has wireless internet, every classroom has a digital projector and computer workstation for the lecturer (and some classrooms have printing capabilities.) The E-Library has 25 workstations allowing access to the college's 50,000+ collection of e-books (and contains technical manuals for Continuing Education courses). The Campus also contains a Barnes and Noble mini-bookstore to provide textbooks, refreshments, and other items to students. On the first floor, a cyber cafe provides internet workstations and several large tables allowing students to gather for study sessions or professors to hold office hours.

The Rohrer Campus has experienced rapid growth. When it opened only 200 students took classes in the building. The number increased to nearly 1,800 students by the Spring 2010 semester. Despite its smaller size compared to the Blackwood and Camden City campuses, students can take all the classes necessary to complete several associate degree programs at the campus. These include degrees in business administration, pre-nursing, psychology, elementary/secondary education, liberal arts, and English. Students taking classes at the Rohrer Campus can also take classes at any of the Camden County College campuses.

On May 1, 2010, the college celebrated the tenth anniversary of the opening of the building. During the reception, a new portrait of William Rohrer was unveiled and continues to hang in the main hall of the campus building.

=== Technical Institute and Regional Emergency Training Center ===
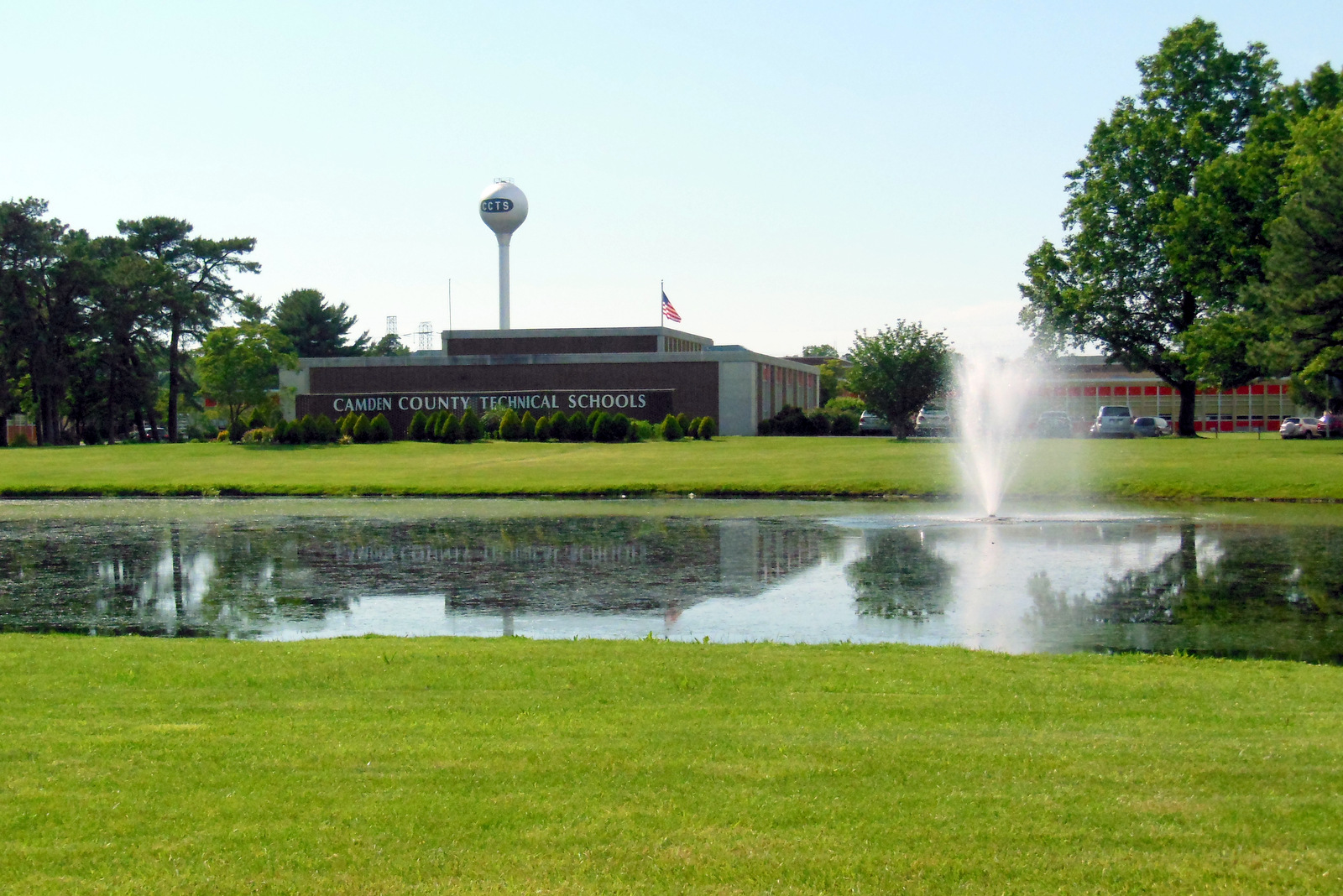
Camden County College Technical Institute in Sicklerville

Opened in 1969, The Camden County Technical Schools provided vocational, emergency and career retraining services and education. On 1 July 2012, several different services of Camden County (including the Police Academy, the Firefighter Academy, EMT training, and adult vocational training) were consolidated under the direction of Camden County College unifying all post-secondary education in Camden County under Camden County College management. The name was consequently changed to the Technical Institute at Camden County College. This consolidation added two locations to Camden County College. The Technical Institute is located in Sicklerville, NJ while the Emergency Training facility is located in Blackwood, NJ (separate location from the Main Blackwood campus).

- The Technical Institute in Sicklerville, formerly the Camden County Technical Schools, offers vocational training and career retraining services. Completing a course of study at the Technical Institute results in a Certificate from Camden County College and certification in the chosen field. Courses of study include construction (including electrical and plumbing training), automotive training, cosmetology, culinary arts, medical assistant training, and wastewater management. The Technical Institute, in alliance with private businesses, provides apprentice services.

Culinary Institute students gain proficiency in restaurant operations. During the spring semester, students are given the opportunity to gain real-world experience by participating in the "Back Door Café" Restaurant, which is open to the public Thursday evenings at the Sicklerville location. The Back Door Café is a gourmet restaurant where the culinary students prepare and serve meals to the public at a low cost.

Cosmetology students gain the skills necessary to meet the requirements of the New Jersey State Board of Cosmetology. Cosmetology students receive more than 1,000 hours of instruction in a well-equipped salon. The Technical Institute of Camden County's Cosmetology Clinic offers the services of a salon/spa at low cost. Students enrolled in the cosmetology program staff a full-service salon each Thursday, September through May. All the students have over 600 hours of study and training.

- Regional Emergency Training Center houses the Firefighter Academy, the EMT training facilities and, as of January 2012, the Camden County Police Academy. The Firefighter Academy also trains volunteer firemen. Four thousand Camden County fire volunteers, representing 58 fire departments, receive practical training at the center each year. Facilities include a "burn house" and a three-story "smokehouse" which are employed to simulate fire and smoke situations.

== Enrollment ==
Camden County College, with its three campuses, is one of the largest public colleges in New Jersey. When the college started, in September 1967, there were 464 students. Enrollment jumped to 2,114 students in its second year. In September 1989, enrollment topped 10,000 students for the first time and, in 1992, enrolled reached 15,000. In total, Camden County College has served the educational needs of over 325,000 students.

Enrollment at the four campuses, as well as the online course program, have all increased over the 2000s. Between 2005 and 2010 the online course program has increased its enrollment credits by 64% from 5,965 credits to 9,773 credits. The Rohrer Campus, located in Cherry Hill, New Jersey, increased its enrollment credits by 44% over the same period. The Camden City Campus increased its enrollment credits by 27% between 2005 and 2010.

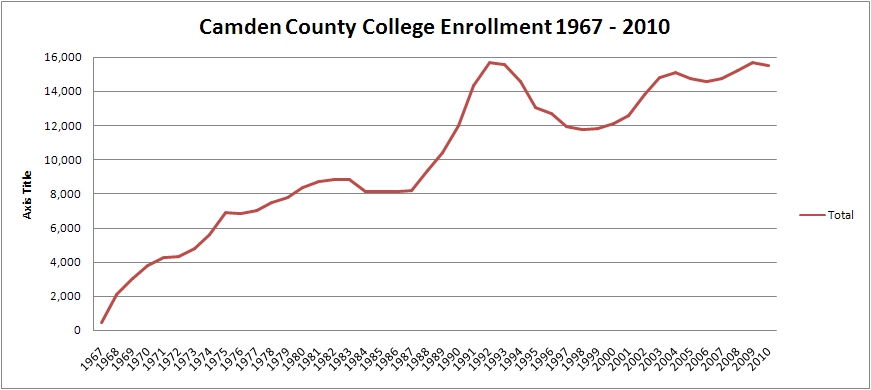

== Services, programs, and interesting events ==
=== Police Academy Flag Raising ===
Flag Raising Ceremony at Camden County College by the Camden County Police Academy, April 2011.

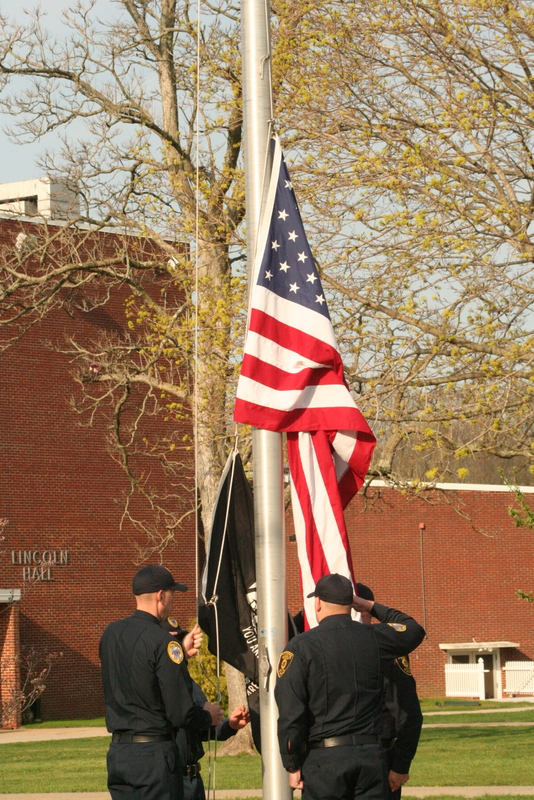
Flag Raising Ceremony by Police Academy at Camden County College in April 2011.

From 1988 to 2011, the Blackwood campus contained the Camden County Police Academy within the Capt. Thomas J. McDonnell Criminal Justice Center. The academy offers introductory police officer training, county correction officer training, and juvenile detention officer training. The academy is a partnership with Camden County College, the Camden County Prosecutor's Office and the Camden County Chiefs of Police.

Members of the police academy would, Monday through Friday, conduct the flag raising and lowering ceremony on campus. The Flag Raising ceremony, which included both a United States National Flag and an MIA/POW Flag, was conducted before the beginning of classes. The Flag lowering ceremony would take place just before the conclusion of the business day of the college. This tradition began in 1988 when the police academy was moved to Camden County College. In September 2011 the Police Academy was moved to the Regional Emergency Training Center of Camden County College in Blackwood, New Jersey. With the move of the Police Academy to another CCC campus the raising and lowering ceremony, which included elaborate parade maneuvers by cadets and the singing of the United States National Anthem, was concluded in May 2011. The video below is the Flag Raising Ceremony at Camden County College by the Camden County Police Academy in April 2011.

=== Honors Program ===
The Honors Program was inaugurated in the Fall 2008 semester. The purpose of the Honors Program is to create an academically rigorous yet supportive community. Students must maintain a 3.5 GPA to remain in the program. Classes within the Honors Program are smaller – usually capped at 20 students rather than the usual 40 – and are writing intensive. Members of the program are required to participate in three campus-based cultural or service events and will have special social, academic and scholarship opportunities available to them during the school year. Students who graduate as a member of the Honors Program receive a special designation in the Commencement Brochure.

Graduates from the honors program have transferred into honors programs at Rutgers University–Camden, Arizona State University, American University, Drexel University, and Wesleyan University. The honors program also has a partnership with Rutgers–Camden which allows CCC students transferring to Rutgers–Camden to be automatically approved for admittance into the Rutgers–Camden Honors Program.

The honors program is run by Jennifer Hoheisel, Professor of Philosophy and Ethics, who was also the college's 2010 Lindback Award winner for teaching excellence.

=== Center for Civic Leadership and Responsibility ===
The Center For Civic Leadership and Responsibility, directed by Professor John Pesda, is part of Camden County College's outreach to the local community. It is the goal of the center to "create an informed citizenry with a heightened sense of civic responsibility..." The Center organizes two lecture series per year, free of charge to the public, by bringing in prominent academics and intellectuals to speak at the college.

=== Honors societies on campus ===
Camden County College currently hosts a number of international, national and state honors societies.

- Kappa Delta Pi

is a national honor society for education majors. Camden County College was the first community college in the United States to have a KDP chapter.

- Mu Alpha Theta

is a national math honor society.

- Phi Theta Kappa

is an international honor society for two-year colleges.

- Psi Beta

is the national honor society in Psychology for community colleges.

- Alpha Mu Gamma

is an honor society honoring achievement in foreign languages.

=== Commencement speakers ===
The Keynote Speakers at the Commencement ceremonies of Camden County College are distinguished persons from the Jersey/South Jersey locale. They have included sitting United States Senators and Congressmen (Senator Robert G. Torricelli, in 2002; Senator (and later Governor) Jon S. Corzine in 2005; Congressman Robert E. Andrews in 2008; and Senator Robert Menendez in 2012). In 2000 Rear Admiral Thomas A. Seigenthaler, USN (Ret.), gave the keynote speech.

Local political leaders have also spoken at Camden County College, including Camden County Freeholder Riletta L. Cream (2003), NJ State Assemblyman Louis D. Greenwald (2004), and New Jersey Assemblywoman Pamela R. Lampitt (2007).

The third group of speakers has been composed of educators. Dr. Constance Clayton, former Superintendent of Schools for the city of Philadelphia, in 1996; Camden County College President Emerita Phyllis DellaVecchia in 2006; Dr. Jeremy McInerney (Chairman-Department of Classical Studies, University of Penn) in 2010; Ms. Sharon Wedington, retiring Vice President of Camden County College, in 2011; and Dr. Wendell E. Pritchett, Chancellor of Rutgers University-Camden, in 2013.

United States Congressman Donald Norcross was selected as the speaker for 2015. The Commencement ceremony took place on May 16, 2015, at the Blackwood Campus. Deputy Secretary of the Department of Labor Christopher Lu also spoke at the ceremony.

== Athletics ==
Camden County College provides academic and athletic options for student-athletes pursuing an associate degree while continuing their athletic pursuits. The school's athletic director is Will Logan.

Camden County College is a member of the National Junior College Athletic Association (NJCAA) in Region XIX. The college's Cougars and Lady Cougars athletic teams participate at the Division III level, which is the designation for colleges that do not offer athletic scholarships. The college is also a member of the Garden State Athletic Conference, in which it competes against other community colleges in New Jersey. Camden County also competes against junior colleges from Delaware, Maryland, Pennsylvania, and New Jersey. The college fields varsity teams for men in baseball, basketball, cross-country, golf, soccer, track and field, and wrestling, while the women's teams compete in basketball, cross-country, golf, soccer, softball, tennis, and track and field.

In 2015, Camden County College brought back wrestling for men, with Gary Papa serving as the college's head wrestling coach until he retired in 2019.

=== Women's soccer ===
The Lady Cougar soccer team has made the playoffs seventeen of its nineteen years including fourteen straight years from 1997 to 2010. It has won four Garden State Championships and two District B championships. The program has been ranked as one of the top 10 programs in the country by the NJCAA four times.

Lindsay Russo, team captain and second-team All-American was honored in 2012 as "Woman of the Year" by the New Jersey's National Association for Girls and Women in Sports.

== Notable alumni ==
- Alex Da Corte (born 1980), artist, featured in the PBS series ART21
- Trymaine Lee (born 1978) Pulitzer Prize-winning journalist.
- Kenneth LeFevre (born 1945), member of the New Jersey General Assembly from 1996 to 2002.
- Tim Lenahan (born 1959, class of 1980), retired soccer coach known for his 20-year tenure as the head men's soccer coach at Northwestern University
- Dave Miller (born 1966), former bullpen coach for the Cleveland Indians of Major League Baseball.
- Carol A. Murphy, politician who has represented the 7th Legislative District in the New Jersey General Assembly since 2018.
- Donald Norcross (born 1958, class of 1980), politician who represents New Jersey's 1st congressional district in the U.S. House of Representatives.
- Harrison Rieger (born 1998), professional basketball player.
- Kelly Ripa (born 1970, didn't graduate), television personality, Host of Live with Regis and Kelly, Live with Kelly and Michael, and Live with Kelly and Ryan.
- Mew2King (born 1989), eSports Athlete

== See also ==
- New Jersey County Colleges
