= Mad FM =

Radio station in Trinidad and Tobago

Mad
- Port of Spain; Trinidad and Tobago
- Frequency: 91.5 MHz

Programming
- Language: English
- Format: Hip Hop, R&B, Reggae, Urban & Variety.

Ownership
- Owner: Caribbean Broadcasting Consultants

History
- First air date: March 8, 2011
- Last air date: 2020 or 2023

Links
- Website: Official Website

Mad FM (91.5 FM) is a radio station broadcasting from Trinidad and Tobago.
