= Blackwood, New Jersey =

Place in Camden County, New Jersey, United States

- Census-designated place
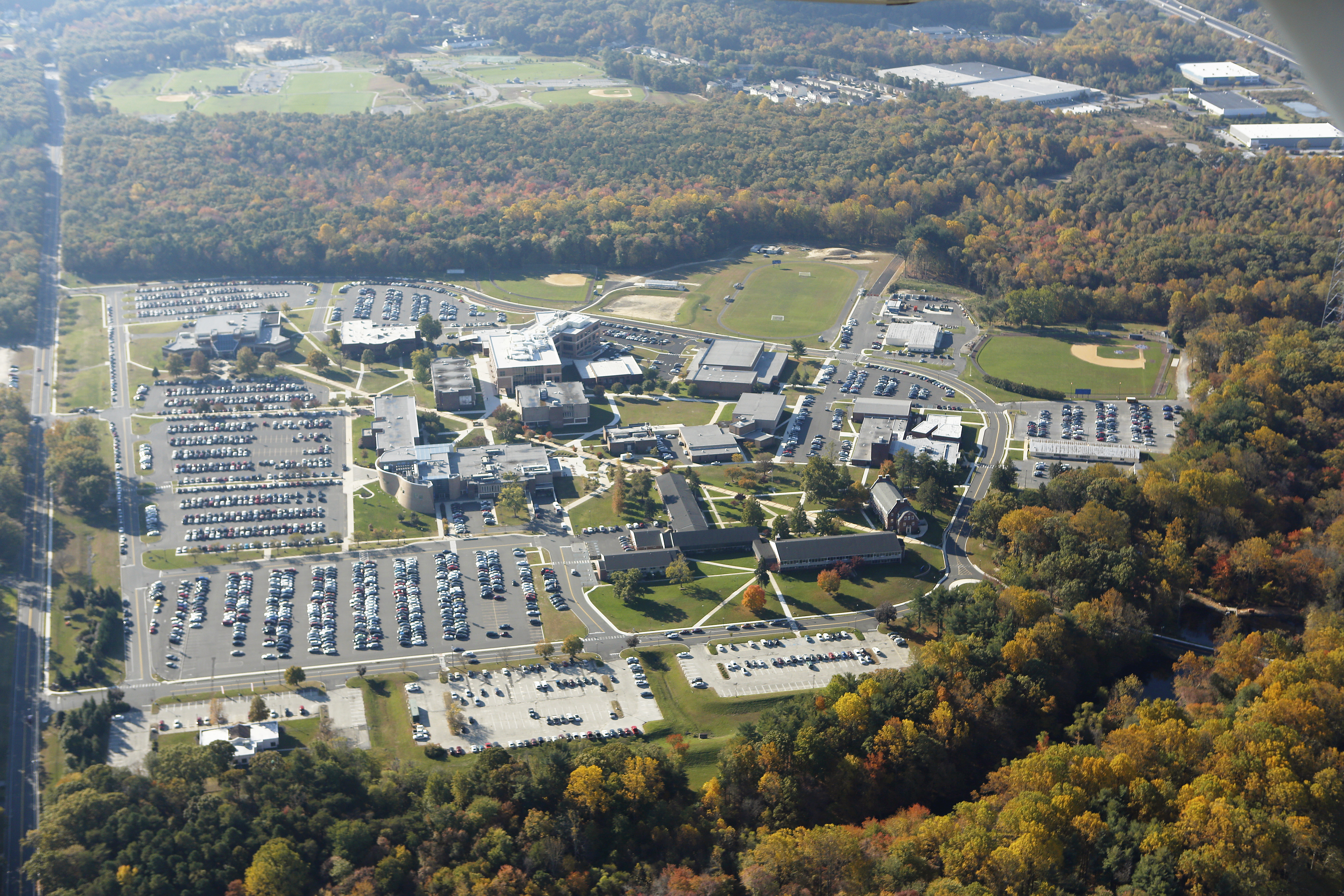
- Aerial view of the main campus of Camden County College in Blackwood

- Map of Blackwood CDP in Camden County. Inset: Location of Camden County within New Jersey.

- Location in Camden County Location in New Jersey Location in the United States
- Coordinates: 39.799065°N 75.063111°W
- Country: United States
- State: New Jersey
- County: Camden
- Township: Gloucester

Area
  - Total: 1.24 sq mi (3.20 km^{2})
  - Land: 1.22 sq mi (3.16 km^{2})
  - Water: 0.015 sq mi (0.04 km^{2}) 0.72%
- Elevation: 46 ft (14 m)

Population (2020)
  - Total: 4,622
  - Density: 3,788.52/sq mi (1,462.76/km^{2})
- Time zone: UTC−05:00 (Eastern (EST))
  - Summer (DST): UTC−04:00 (Eastern (EDT))
- ZIP Code: 08012
- Area code: 856
- FIPS code: 34-06040
- GNIS feature ID: 02389213

Blackwood is an unincorporated community and census-designated place (CDP) located within Gloucester Township, in Camden County, in the U.S. state of New Jersey. As of the 2020 census, Blackwood had a population of 4,622. It is located 10 miles (16 km) from the city of Camden and 14.6 miles (23.5 km) away from Philadelphia in the South Jersey region of the state.

Blackwood is the home of the main campus of Camden County College. Blackwood is home to Camden County College's radio station WDBK, which has been broadcasting on 91.5 FM since 1977.

== History ==
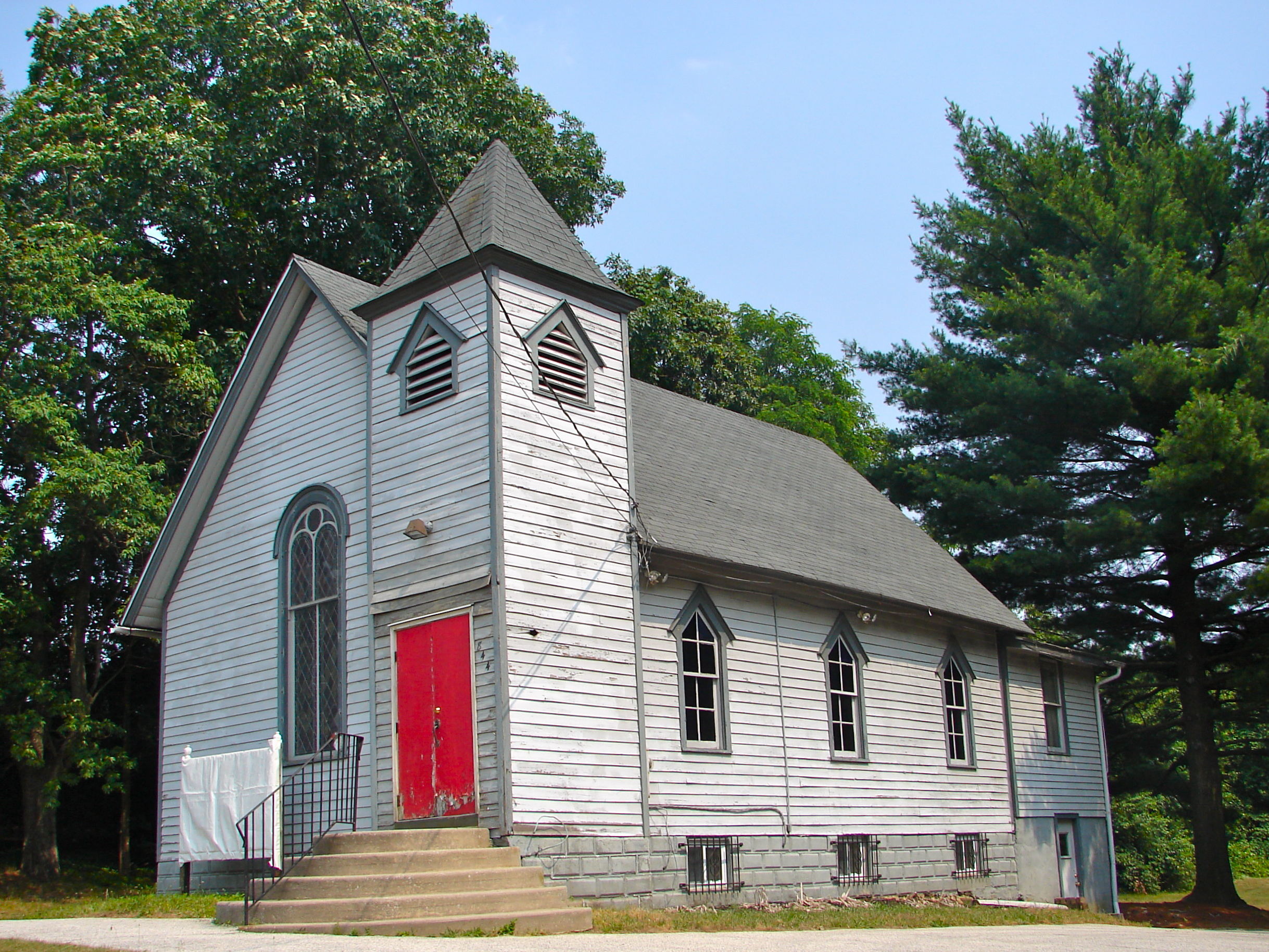
Solomon Wesley United Methodist Church, listed on the National Register of Historic Places

Blackwood, originally known as Blackwoodtown, was settled about 1750 by John Blackwood in an area then known as "head of Timber Creek." Blackwood was a fuller who immigrated from Scotland and established mills in Blackwoodtown. The area was a crossroads village along the Black Horse Pike well into the nineteenth century, that served as a local government and transportation center by the 1830s, when Uriah Norcross established a stage coach line between Camden and Woodbury with a stop at a tavern in Blackwoodtown. The arrival of the Camden County Railroad in 1891 led to further development.

Blackwood Lake operated as a summer resort from 1891 until 1932.

== Geography ==
According to the U.S. Census Bureau, Blackwood had a total area of 1.235 square miles (3.20 km^{2}), including 1.226 square miles (3.18 km^{2}) of land and 0.009 square miles (0.023 km^{2}) of water (0.72%). Bodies of water include Blackwood Lake and Farrows Run stream.

== Parks and recreation ==
- Gloucester Township Health and Fitness Trail, formerly known as the Blackwood Railroad Trail
- Kiwanis's Baseball Fields (Marshall & Railroad Ave)
- Al Raw's Field (Lincoln Drive)
- Harwan Park (Black Horse Pike)
- State Street Park

== Demographics ==
Historical population
| Census | Pop. | Note | %± |
|---|---|---|---|
| 1950 | 1,344 | | — |
| 1980 | 5,219 | | — |
| 1990 | 5,120 | | −1.9% |
| 2000 | 4,692 | | −8.4% |
| 2010 | 4,545 | | −3.1% |
| 2020 | 4,622 | | 1.7% |
Population sources: 1980; 1950 1960 1970; 1980 1990 2000; 2010 2020

Blackwood first appeared as an unincorporated community in the 1950 U.S. census. The community was not listed in the 1960 U.S. census or the 1970 U.S. census. Blackwood was then listed as a census designated place in the 1980 U.S. census.

=== Racial and ethnic composition ===
Blackwood CDP, New Jersey – Racial and ethnic composition Note: the US Census treats Hispanic/Latino as an ethnic category. This table excludes Latinos from the racial categories and assigns them to a separate category. Hispanics/Latinos may be of any race.
| Race / Ethnicity (NH = Non-Hispanic) | Pop 2000 | Pop 2010 | Pop 2020 | % 2000 | % 2010 | % 2020 |
|---|---|---|---|---|---|---|
| White alone (NH) | 4,232 | 3,887 | 3,427 | 90.20% | 85.52% | 74.15% |
| Black or African American alone (NH) | 172 | 211 | 360 | 3.67% | 4.64% | 7.79% |
| Native American or Alaska Native alone (NH) | 3 | 2 | 2 | 0.06% | 0.04% | 0.04% |
| Asian alone (NH) | 99 | 115 | 178 | 2.11% | 2.53% | 3.85% |
| Native Hawaiian or Pacific Islander alone (NH) | 3 | 0 | 0 | 0.06% | 0.00% | 0.00% |
| Other race alone (NH) | 1 | 3 | 18 | 0.02% | 0.07% | 0.39% |
| Mixed race or Multiracial (NH) | 34 | 57 | 154 | 0.72% | 1.25% | 3.33% |
| Hispanic or Latino (any race) | 148 | 270 | 483 | 3.15% | 5.94% | 10.45% |
| Total | 4,692 | 4,545 | 4,622 | 100.00% | 100.00% | 100.00% |

=== 2020 census ===
As of the 2020 census, Blackwood had a population of 4,622. The median age was 38.5 years. 21.1% of residents were under the age of 18 and 15.5% of residents were 65 years of age or older. For every 100 females there were 102.4 males, and for every 100 females age 18 and over there were 100.7 males age 18 and over.

100.0% of residents lived in urban areas, while 0.0% lived in rural areas.

There were 1,724 households in Blackwood, of which 31.1% had children under the age of 18 living in them. Of all households, 48.9% were married-couple households, 18.4% were households with a male householder and no spouse or partner present, and 24.8% were households with a female householder and no spouse or partner present. About 22.6% of all households were made up of individuals and 11.7% had someone living alone who was 65 years of age or older.

There were 1,825 housing units, of which 5.5% were vacant. The homeowner vacancy rate was 1.7% and the rental vacancy rate was 9.5%.

=== 2010 census ===
The 2010 United States census counted 4,545 people, 1,687 households, and 1,210 families in the CDP. The population density was 3,706.4 people per square mile (1,431.0 people/km^{2}). There were 1,800 housing units at an average density of 1,467.9 units per square mile (566.8 units/km^{2}). The racial makeup was 88.71% (4,032) White, 5.21% (237) Black or African American, 0.04% (2) Native American, 2.53% (115) Asian, 0.00% (0) Pacific Islander, 1.63% (74) from other races, and 1.87% (85) from two or more races. Hispanic or Latino were 5.94% (270) of the population.

Of the 1,687 households, 29.8% had children under the age of 18; 52.2% were married couples living together; 13.2% had a female householder with no husband present and 28.3% were non-families. Of all households, 23.8% were made up of individuals and 9.7% had someone living alone who was 65 years of age or older. The average household size was 2.69 and the average family size was 3.19.

22.4% of the population were under the age of 18, 8.5% from 18 to 24, 26.8% from 25 to 44, 27.8% from 45 to 64, and 14.4% who were 65 years of age or older. The median age was 40.2 years. For every 100 females, the population had 98.6 males. For every 100 females ages 18 and older there were 95.1 males.

=== 2000 census ===
As of the 2000 United States census there were 4,692 people, 1,721 households, and 1,261 families residing in the section. The population density was 1,461.0 people/km^{2} (3,784 people/mi^{2}). There were 1,840 housing units at an average density of 572.9 units/km^{2} (1,484 units/mi^{2}). The racial makeup of the section was 91.30% White, 3.94% African American, 0.11% Native American, 2.11% Asian, 0.06% Pacific Islander, 1.19% from other races, and 1.28% from two or more races. Hispanic or Latino of any race were 3.15% of the population.

There were 1,721 households, out of which 32.4% had children under the age of 18 living with them, 55.8% were married couples living together, 12.0% had a female householder with no husband present, and 26.7% were non-families. 22.5% of all households were made up of individuals, and 10.1% had someone living alone who was 65 years of age or older. The average household size was 2.68 and the average family size was 3.16.

In the section the population was spread out, with 24.1% under the age of 18, 7.7% from 18 to 24, 30.3% from 25 to 44, 22.1% from 45 to 64, and 15.9% who were 65 years of age or older. The median age was 38 years. For every 100 females, there were 98.7 males. For every 100 females age 18 and over, there were 97.7 males.

The median income for a household in the section was $49,707, and the median income for a family was $60,136. Males had a median income of $41,274 versus $30,677 for females. The per capita income for the section was $21,815. About 0.9% of families and 4.0% of the population were below the poverty line, including 0.6% of those under age 18 and 6.0% of those age 65 or over.

== Historic district ==
- Blackwood Historic District
- U.S. National Register of Historic Places
- U.S. Historic district
- New Jersey Register of Historic Places
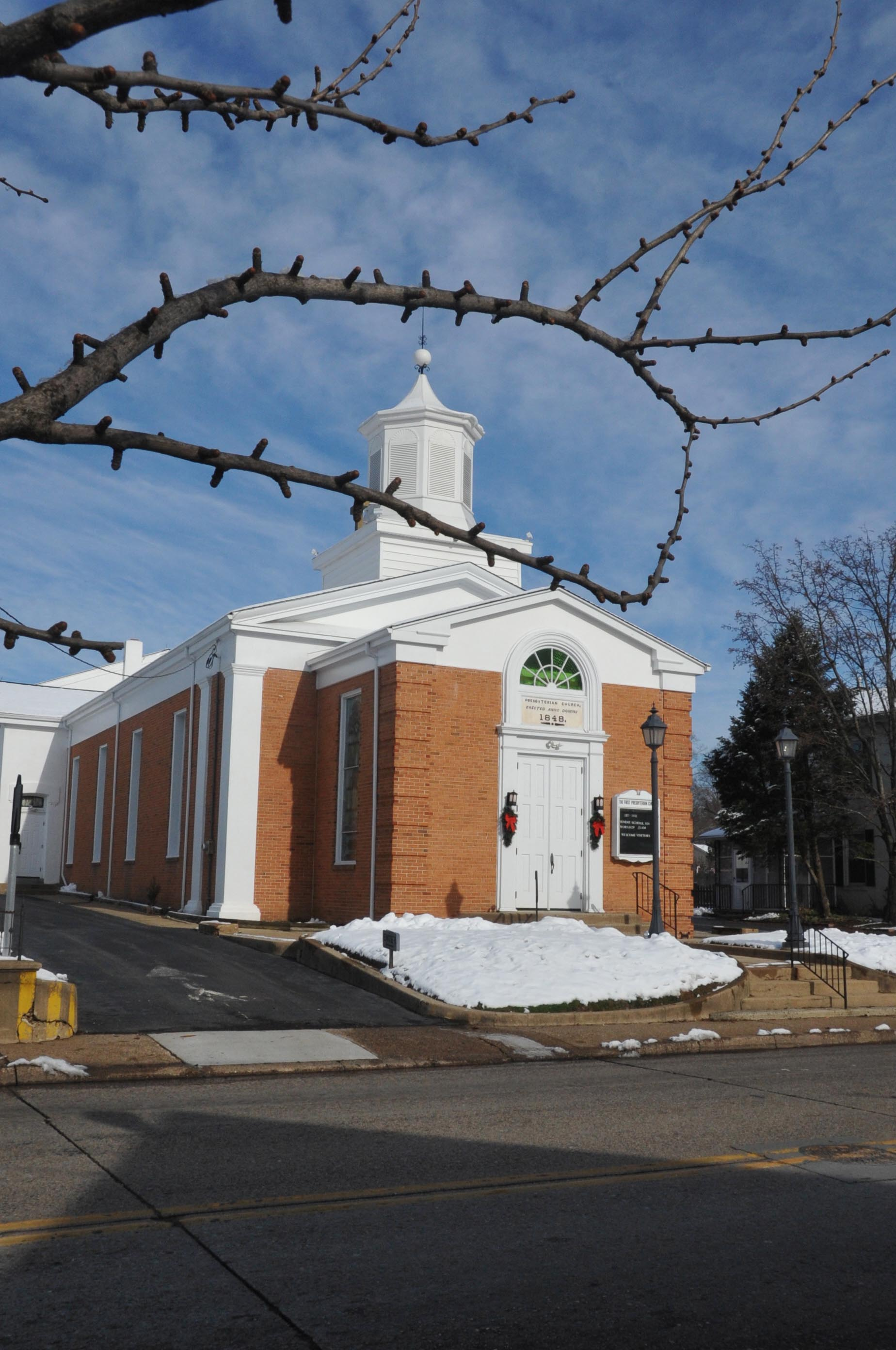
- Blackwood First Methodist Episcopal Church
- Location: Black Horse Pike, Baptist Lane, Church and Elm streets, Central and East Railroad avenues
- Area: 42 acres (17 ha)
- Architectural style: Greek Revival, Queen Anne
- NRHP reference No.: 89000996
- NJRHP No.: 956

Significant dates
- Added to NRHP: July 27, 1989
- Designated NJRHP: June 20, 1989

The Blackwood Historic District is a 42-acre (17 ha) national historic district along the Black Horse Pike, Baptist Lane, Church and Elm streets, Central and East Railroad avenues in the community. It was added to the National Register of Historic Places on July 27, 1989, for its significance in commerce and community development. The district includes 87 contributing buildings, 3 contributing structures, and 3 contributing sites. The Blackwood First Methodist Episcopal Church was built in 1856 with Greek Revival/Italianate style.

== Education ==
Public schools, that are part of the Gloucester Township Public Schools district, include Blackwood Elementary School, Gloucester Township Elementary School as well as Charles W. Lewis Middle School Highland Regional High School is part of the Black Horse Pike Regional School District.

The Kingdom Charter School of Leadership is a charter school that serves students in Kindergarten through sixth grade residing in Gloucester Township, who are accepted by lottery on a space-available basis.

Our Lady of Hope Regional School is a Roman Catholic elementary school that operates under the auspices of the Roman Catholic Diocese of Camden. Our Lady of Hope Regional School was renamed following the 2008 merger of St. Jude's Regional School with St. Agnes School.

Higher education in Blackwood includes Pennco Tech and Camden County College.

== Notable people ==
People who were born in, residents of, or otherwise closely associated with Blackwood include:

- Jersey Bakley (1864–1915) was a Major League Baseball pitcher who was 19 years old when he broke into the big leagues in 1883 with the Philadelphia Athletics.
- Nick Comoroto (born 1991) professional wrestler known for his appearances with the professional wrestling promotions WWE and All Elite Wrestling.
- Mike Daniels (born 1989), defensive end for the Cincinnati Bengals.
- John A. Dramesi (1933–2017), prisoner of war who had been held by the Viet Cong in the Hanoi Hilton.
- David R. Mayer (born 1967), who represented the 4th Legislative District in the New Jersey General Assembly from 2002 to 2008 and served on the Gloucester Township Council from 2002 to 2003 and as mayor of Gloucester Township.
- Erik Menendez (born 1970), convicted murderer.
- Joseph Menna (born 1970), sculptor.
- Gabriela Mosquera (born 1977), politician, who has served in the New Jersey General Assembly since 2012, where she represents the 4th Legislative District.
- Billy Paul (1934–2016), Grammy Award-winning soul singer.
- Joe Vitt (born 1954), interim head coach of the New Orleans Saints.
