= KYFA-FM =

Radio station in Ginger–Garland, Texas

- Ginger, Texas; United States
- Frequency: 91.5 MHz
- Branding: La Estación para la Familia

Programming
- Format: Spanish Christian

Ownership
- Owner: Central Park Church of God, Inc.

History
- First air date: 2010

Technical information
- Licensing authority: FCC
- Facility ID: 174944
- Class: A
- ERP: 200 watts
- HAAT: 48 meters (157 ft)
- Transmitter coordinates: 32°52′3.45″N 95°45′4.87″W
- Translator: K240DS (95.9 MHz) Garland

Links
- Public license information: Public file; LMS
- Website: www.laestacionparalafamilia.com

KYFA-FM is a radio station broadcasting on 91.5 FM, licensed to Ginger, Texas, United States. The station feeds a dependent translator, K240DS 95.9 FM licensed to Garland, with partial coverage of the eastern portion of the Dallas–Fort Worth Metroplex. KYFA and K240DS air Spanish-language Christian programming and are known as La Estación para la Familia (The Station for the Family).

== History ==
On May 28, 2008, the Federal Communications Commission granted a construction permit to the Iglesia Cristiana Ebenezer to build a new radio station in Ginger. The permit was transferred twice, to Hispanic Family Christian Network and then to the Central Park Church of God, before KYFA-FM began operations in December 2010.
