= WDBK =

Radio station at Camden County College in Blackwood, New Jersey

WDBK – FM
- Blackwood, New Jersey; United States
- Broadcast area: Camden and Gloucester Counties
- Frequency: 91.5 MHz
- Branding: 91.5 WDBK

Programming
- Format: College Radio

Ownership
- Owner: Camden County College

History
- First air date: 1977

Technical information
- Licensing authority: FCC
- Facility ID: 8468
- Class: A
- ERP: 140 watts
- HAAT: 25.0 meters
- Transmitter coordinates: 39°47′6″N 75°2′19″W

Links
- Public license information: – FM Public file; LMS
- Webcast: Listen live
- Website: Camdencc.edu

WDBK (91.5 FM) is the radio station of Camden County College, serving the campus and wider Camden County community since 1977. WDBK is a 100-watt, non-commercial radio station broadcasting at 91.5 FM from the school's Blackwood studios.
