= Solomon Wesley United Methodist Church =

Historic church in New Jersey, United States

- U.S. National Register of Historic Places
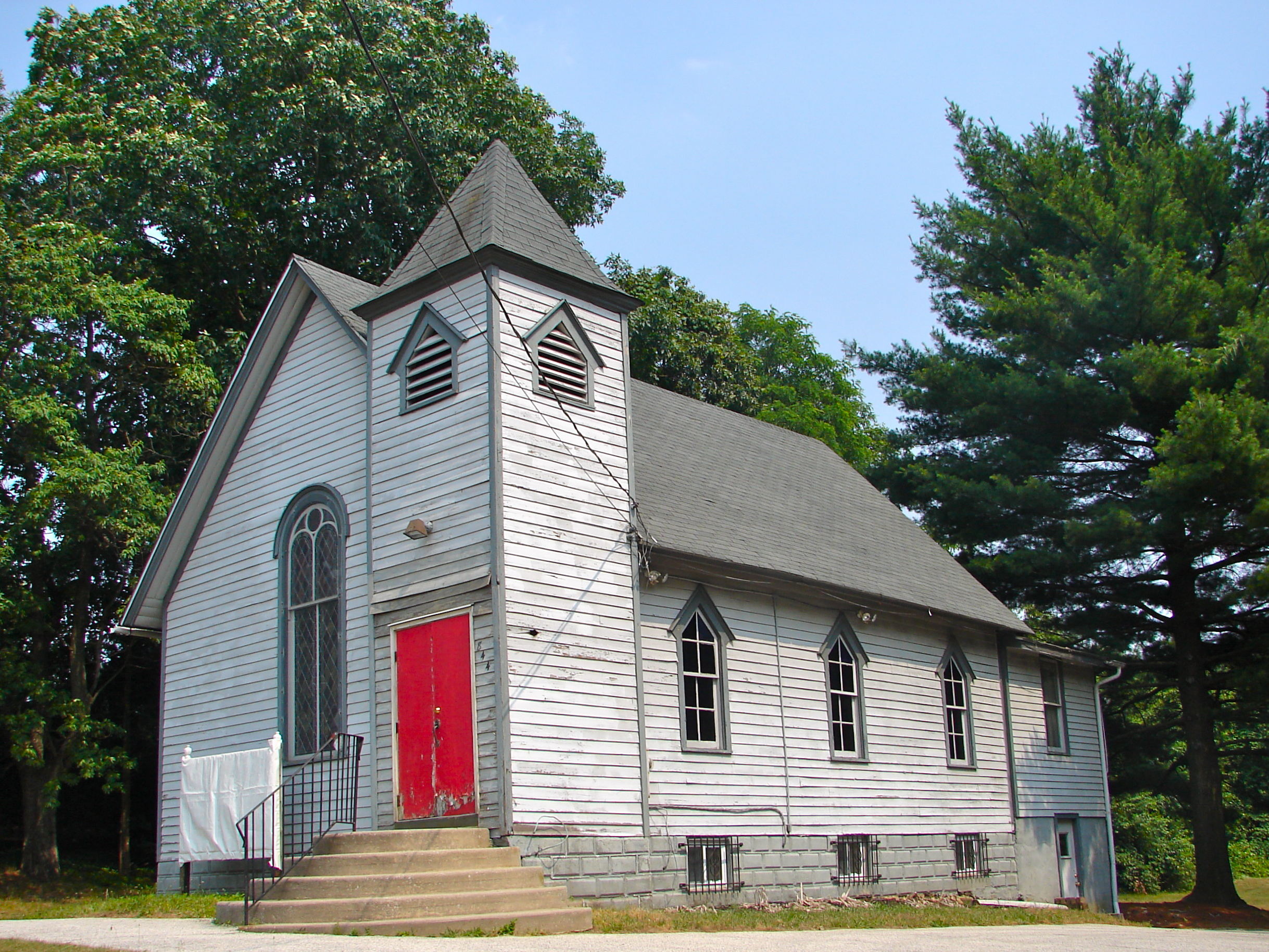

- Location within Camden County, New Jersey Location within New Jersey Location within the United States
- Location: 291-B Davistown Road / Asyla Road, Blackwood, New Jersey
- Coordinates: 39°47′35″N 75°2′46″W
- Area: 0.5 acres (0.20 ha)
- Built: 1850
- Architectural style: Mid-19th Century Vernacular
- NRHP reference No.: 89000241
- Added to NRHP: April 10, 1989

Solomon Wesley United Methodist Church is a historic church at 291-B Davistown Road / Asyla Road in the Blackwood section of Gloucester Township, Camden County, New Jersey, United States.

It was built in 1850 and added to the National Register of Historic Places in 1989.

== Address change ==
Blackwood is part of Gloucester Township, Camden County, New Jersey, and the municipality renamed Asyla-Davistown Road as Davistown Road on May 23, 1988, through this Gloucester Township ordinance:

Chapter 73. Street Address Numbering

§ 73-A. Name Changed

Pursuant to N.J.S.A 40:67-1, et seq., said street and roadway in the Township of Gloucester, County of Camden, between Erial Road and Black Horse Pike (sometimes known as "Davistown Road" and sometimes known as "Asyla Road") be and is hereby designated and hereinafter known as "Davistown Road".

The church address became 844 Davistown Road, Blackwood, New Jersey.

== Historical and architectural significance ==
Afro-Americans in New Jersey: a short history by Giles R. Wright (Trenton, NJ, New Jersey Historical Commission, 1989), discusses the importance of the community of Davistown where the church is situated and a digital edition is available from the NJ State Library as a free download (pdf) -- see link below. Black Heritage Sites. The North, Volume 1 by Nancy C. Curtis also discusses Davistown and the founding of the church. "A History of Davistown and its residents" by Viola M. Johnson, (Davis family Historian) 2009, second edition.

The family settlement called Davistown had its roots in a four-acre parcel of land purchased in 1813 by Solomon Davis. This land was purchased from Daniel and Tamzon Bates for the sum of $10.00.

Solomon Davis married Reason Valinda (Lindley) Boyer, daughter of Jacob and Jane Boyer and with her fathered eleven children. Between 1820 and 1840 the Davis family purchased much of the land that became Davistown from the heirs of Jacob and Jane Boyer. By 1840 the family settlement had become a small town. In 1842 Gloucester Township surveyed and built a road that is still called the Davistown Road. 1n 1850 Davistown built a church on land purchased from Zachariah and Catherine Davis by Solomon Davis Sr. Noble Davis, and Perry Frisby. (Father, son and son-in-law) In its 162-year history, the Solomon Wesley Church has been both African Methodist Episcopal, and United Methodist.

The church's adjacent cemetery has several graves of Davis descendants and descendants of Caleb and Christiana (Murry) Shaw. (Caleb and his children were early members of the church). See the Camden County Historical Society document that lists Solomon Wesley Cemetery, Davistown. Veterans who served in the United States Colored Troops (USCT) during the American Civil War and veterans from the Spanish–American War, World War I, and World War II are buried in the cemetery.

The building is also noted for its mid-19th century vernacular architecture.

December 5, 1870 the Davistown School for Colored Children was "set off" from Spring Mills. The Davistown school was the only school for colored children in the county and the only two story building in the area.

A picture of the Davistown church is one of eight buildings pictured around the seal of Gloucester Township. The church on listed on the state and national register of historic places.

== Restoration efforts and change in denomination ==
A restoration of the church was first started by its then UM members in the 1990s. Work was done on its interior and a plan made for restoration of the exterior.

In 2012 Solomon Wesley was sold by the United Methodist Church to Pastor Toki L. Taylor who is a member of the clergy in the Fruit of the Spirit Ministries. As a result, the church was renamed "Fruit of the Spirit Ministries (home of the historic Solomon Wesley United Methodist Church)." Donyale Brown serves as the church administrator.

Pastor Taylor, the church elders, and members began fundraising to help restore the church building for use, with support from Gloucester Township, members of the Davistown community, members of the United Methodist Church, among others. A three-day public fundraising event was held August 31 to September 2, 2012, on the church grounds. The church has scheduled November 18, 2012, at 11 a.m., to dedicate the church building, followed by ordination of clergy and installation of church officers at an evening service.

== See also ==
- National Register of Historic Places listings in Camden County, New Jersey
