= WRBC =

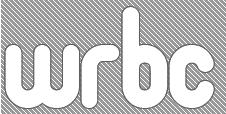
- Lewiston, Maine; United States
- Broadcast area: Lewiston-Auburn, Maine
- Frequency: 91.5 MHz
- Branding: The Monkey

Programming
- Format: Freeform

Ownership
- Owner: President & Trustees of Bates College

History
- First air date: October 26, 1958
- Former call signs: WCOU, WVBC, WRJR
- Call sign meaning: Radio Bates College

Technical information
- Licensing authority: FCC
- Facility ID: 53405
- Class: A
- ERP: 120 watts
- HAAT: 5 meters (16 ft)
- Transmitter coordinates: 44.105°N 70.208°W

Links
- Public license information: Public file; LMS
- Webcast: Listen live
- Website: wrbcradio.com

WRBC is the college radio station of Bates College, located in Lewiston, Maine and at 91.5 MHz on the FM dial. The WRBC studio is located in the basement of 31 Frye Street across from the student coffee house, The Ronj. The WRBC board of directors publish an online music blog called The Monkey.

WRBC is currently ranked by The Princeton Review as the 12th best college radio station in the United States and Canada, making it the top college radio in the New England Small College Athletic Conference. WRBC was also the Maine headquarters for College Radio Day in October 2012.

== History ==
Originally started as an AM station, radio at Bates began with the efforts of rhetoric professor and debate coach Brooks Quimby. A radio enthusiast, he ran his own amateur station, and wrote the FCC in 1942 asking to build a 10-watt radio station on campus. Though his efforts to secure a license were unsuccessful, he did not give up. "Bates On The Air", a weekly program produced by his Radio Class from studios in Chase Hall, debuted in 1945 on WCOU in Lewiston. This program was also occasionally carried on stations in Portland and Augusta, and continued into the mid-1950s.

=== 1950s ===
In the spring of 1951, interest in a campus radio station resurfaced among the student body. A group of students met to organize and plan for the construction. A professor in the Physics department volunteered to build the transmitting equipment for a carrier current AM station. That fall an organizational meeting drew 150 people. The station, calling itself WVBC (Voice of Bates College), signed on at 9:00 p.m. on Friday evening, November 2, 1951. Broadcasting from the Chase Hall studios, it initially featured a two-hour schedule of programming six nights a week. The signal could be heard at 640 kHz in all campus buildings, except the infirmary.

Despite its beginning, technical problems plagued the station in the 1950s. Because of these problems Bates College again applied to the FCC for a 10-watt station on the then relatively new FM band. The staff suggested several possible call signs for the new station to the FCC including WVBC, WBCR, WRBC, WVOB, and WRJR (after the first initials of staff members Ron Cook, Joan Williams Lepper, Ray Hendess, and Robert Kalisher). The FCC decided on the call letters WRJR. The new station took to the public airwaves at 1:00 p.m. on Sunday, October 26, 1958, at 91.5 FM, from purpose-built studios in the basement of Pettigrew Hall.

Despite its technical superiority, FM radio had yet to come into mass acceptance. Since so few people owned FM-capable radios in 1958, FM-to-AM converters were initially installed at strategic locations around the Bates College campus to rebroadcast the signal at 800 AM. However, these converters soon either broke down, or were shut down due to issues with off-campus interference. As a result, WRJR found itself broadcasting to slim audiences, both on campus and off.

=== 1970s and 1980s ===
In the early 1970s, WRJR moved from its purpose-built studio in the basement of Pettigrew to its present quarters in the basement of The Office of Career Services at 31 Frye Street. The new basement location offered multiple studios which have since converted to office space. The station's transmitting antenna was also moved to its present location behind its current studios. Though the call letters WRJR had been with the station for many years, they were not immediately interpretable as being related to Bates College. Station managers, including Jonathan Hall - now a television news anchor in Boston - had tried for a number of combinations, including WBCR (Bates College Radio) and WVBC (Voice of Bates College). Then in the late 1970s, an all-news AM station in Jackson, Mississippi, with the call letters WRBC. went silent. The station applied to the FCC for a new call sign, and on April 5, 1981 (the 126th anniversary of Bates' founding), the small college station formally became known as WRBC ("Radio Bates College").

In 1982, WRBC increased its power output from 10 watts to the present 120 watts. This increased the station's listening area greatly. Previously the station could only be heard on campus and in the surrounding neighborhoods of Lewiston. Although previously licensed to transmit at up to 10 watts, a measurement made in 1974 recorded only 3 watts of actual output from the antenna. After the upgrade the station could now be picked up for about a 10- to 15-mile radius around the Bates campus. The station commenced 24-hour operation in the early 1980s. Students would work 3-hour shifts, and it was no problem finding people willing to do 3–6 am during the week. WRBC also featured news from the ABC radio network during this period, through an agreement with local station WLAM. Starting in 1988, General Manager Scott Dalton and Program Director R. Kevin Doyle, along with the rest of the staff, worked to pay off the station's accrued debt while also beginning the conversion of WRBC to a digital station.

=== 1990s and present day ===
In 1990, General Manager Sheri Pizzi and Program Director George Reese landed funding to renovate the station's on-air and production studies and convert the entire station from LP to CD. They began a program to reach out to the local community that included shows broadcast by Lewiston/Auburn residents. As Summer 1992 approached General Manager Denis Howard and his fellow staff members announced an open invitation to residents of the greater Lewiston / Auburn area to attend the weekly station meetings. This was done to determine interest in (and the potential of) broadcasting throughout the summer months after most Bates students had returned home. This program increased the station's listenership in the twin cities as many WRBC genre directors are members of the L/A community and not Bates students. In 2013, twenty out of WRBC's 75 active radio shows are hosted by members of the L/A community.

== See also ==
- Campus radio
- List of college radio stations in the United States
