= KPAE =

Radio station in Erwinville, Louisiana

- Erwinville, Louisiana; United States
- Frequency: 91.5 MHz
- Branding: Sound Radio

Programming
- Format: Christian radio
- Affiliations: Salem Radio Network

Ownership
- Owner: Port Allen Educational Broadcasting Foundation

History
- Former call signs: Port Allen Educational Broadcasting

Technical information
- Facility ID: 53023
- Class: C3
- ERP: 10,000 watts
- HAAT: 50.0 meters (164.0 ft)
- Transmitter coordinates: 30°32′09″N 91°24′52″W

Links
- Website: soundradio.org

KPAE (91.5 MHz) is a radio station broadcasting a Christian radio format. Licensed to Erwinville, Louisiana, United States. The station is currently owned by Port Allen Educational Broadcasting Foundation and features programming from Salem Radio Network.

Programming is simulcast with co-owned 89.7 WPAE, an FM station in Centreville, Mississippi.
