= WJYO =

- Fort Myers, Florida; United States
- Frequency: 91.5 MHz
- Branding: 91.5 Kingdom FM

Programming
- Format: Christian Talk and Teaching - Worship Music

Ownership
- Owner: Airwaves For Jesus, Inc.

History
- First air date: March 31, 1987; 39 years ago (as WSCA)
- Former call signs: WSCA (1987–1989); WSRX (1989–1992)

Technical information
- Licensing authority: FCC
- Facility ID: 67215
- Class: A
- ERP: 3,000 watts
- HAAT: 87 meters (285 ft)
- Transmitter coordinates: 26°30′18.00″N 81°51′14.00″W

Links
- Public license information: Public file; LMS
- Webcast: Listen Live
- Website: www.kingdom.fm

WJYO (91.5 FM) is a non-commercial, listener-supported radio station broadcasting a Christian talk and teaching radio format. It is licensed to Fort Myers, Florida, and is owned by Airwaves For Jesus, Inc.

Most of the schedule is programs hosted by national religions leaders including David Jeremiah, Jim Daly, Greg Laurie, Adrian Rogers, Charles Stanley and J. Vernon McGee. There are also blocks of worship music as well as some original programming. Donations are sought on the air and on the station's website.

WJYO is a Class A FM station. It has an effective radiated power (ERP) of 3,000 watts.
