= KSNS =

- Medicine Lodge, Kansas; United States
- Frequency: 91.5 MHz

Programming
- Format: Contemporary Christian music

Ownership
- Owner: Florida Public Radio, Inc.

History
- Call sign meaning: Keep Singing New Songs

Technical information
- Licensing authority: FCC
- Facility ID: 83614
- Class: C1
- ERP: 96,000 watts
- HAAT: 141 meters (463 ft)
- Transmitter coordinates: 37°14′02″N 98°39′57″W

Links
- Public license information: Public file; LMS
- Website: krejksns.org

KSNS (91.5 FM) is a radio station broadcasting a Contemporary Christian music format licensed to Medicine Lodge, Kansas. The station is owned by Florida Public Radio, Inc.

On May 28, 2025, the FCC approved the sale of KREJ and KSNS to Smile FM, due to the licensee unable to fully maintain the stations.
