= WPSF =

- Clewiston, Florida; United States
- Broadcast area: Hendry County, Florida
- Frequency: 91.5 MHz
- Branding: "Call Radio"

Programming
- Format: Contemporary Christian Top 40

Ownership
- Owner: Call Communications Group, Inc.

Technical information
- Licensing authority: FCC
- Facility ID: 83097
- Class: A
- ERP: 700 watts
- HAAT: 118.0 meters (387.1 ft)
- Transmitter coordinates: 26°41′28.24″N 80°47′17.22″W

Links
- Public license information: Public file; LMS

WPSF (91.5 FM) is a non-commercial, listener-supported radio station licensed to Clewiston, Florida, and serving Hendry County in South Florida. The station is owned by Call Communications Group, Inc. WPSF is one of several South Florida FM stations simulcasting a Christian Contemporary Top 40 format, known as "Call Radio."
