= KCAS =

Radio station in McCook, Texas

- McCook, Texas; United States
- Broadcast area: Rio Grande Valley
- Frequency: 91.5 MHz

Programming
- Format: Conservative Religious
- Affiliations: VCY America

Ownership
- Owner: Faith Baptist Ministries; (Faith Baptist Church, Inc.)

History
- Call sign meaning: Know Christ As Savior

Technical information
- Licensing authority: FCC
- Facility ID: 85028
- Class: A
- ERP: 2,500 watts
- HAAT: 109 meters (358 ft)
- Transmitter coordinates: 26°28′51″N 98°23′45″W

Links
- Public license information: Public file; LMS
- Webcast: Listen Live
- Website: www.kcasradio.org

KCAS (91.5 FM) is a non-commercial educational radio station licensed to serve McCook, Texas. McCook is a dispersed rural community about 20 miles northwest of the county seat, Edinburg, in Hidalgo County, Texas. The station is owned and operated by Faith Baptist Ministries and the broadcast license is held by Faith Baptist Church, Inc.

KCAS broadcasts a conservative religious radio format to the McAllen, Texas, and the Rio Grande Valley. News programming on KCAS is provided by SRN News.

== History ==
This station received its original construction permit from the Federal Communications Commission on January 21, 1998. The new station was assigned the KCAS call sign by the FCC on March 2, 1998. KCAS received its license to cover from the FCC on April 11, 2001.
