= XHTL-FM (Veracruz) =

Radio station in Tuxpan, Veracruz

- Tuxpan, Veracruz; Mexico
- Frequency: 91.5 MHz
- Branding: La Ola

Programming
- Format: Pop

Ownership
- Owner: Calixto Almazán y Ferrer

History
- First air date: June 20, 1941 (concession)
- Former call signs: XETL-AM (1941–2017)
- Former frequencies: 1390 AM

Technical information
- Licensing authority: CRT
- Class: B1
- ERP: 10,000 watts
- HAAT: 34.00 m

Links
- Webcast: Listen live
- Website: www.radioola.com.mx

XHTL-FM is a radio station in Tuxpan, Veracruz. Broadcasting on 91.5 FM, XHTL is known as La Ola.

== History ==
Logo as Radio Ola, used until 2020

XETL-AM 1390 received its concession in 1941, making it among the first radio stations in Veracruz. It added its FM counterpart in 1994 and shuttered its AM station by surrendering the frequency in 2017.
