= KYDS =

Radio station in Sacramento, California

Coordinates: 38.609°N 121.362°W

- Sacramento, California; United States
- Broadcast area: Sacramento, California
- Frequency: 91.5 MHz
- Branding: KYDS 91.5

Programming
- Format: Variety

Ownership
- Owner: San Juan Unified School District

History
- First air date: 1979
- Call sign meaning: Reminiscent of "kids"

Technical information
- Licensing authority: FCC
- Facility ID: 58888
- Class: A
- ERP: 410 watts
- HAAT: 33 meters

Links
- Public license information: Public file; LMS
- Webcast: Listen live
- Website: KYDS Online

KYDS is a Sacramento, California FM radio station with the frequency 91.5 MHz. It is maintained at El Camino Fundamental High School, and select students from the school are allowed to participate in its operation. The original inception of KYDS was in 1976, when it broadcast only in the school cafeteria during lunch hour. KYDS originally received its FCC broadcast license in 1978 as one of the last Class "D" licensed FM stations in the country. The station went on the air with 10 watts of power (transmitter power output, not effective radiated power), into a 4-bay antenna and broadcast a monaural signal that effectively covered a 5-mile radius. Due to the COVID-19 pandemic and a campaign to modernize, the station now broadcasts on the internet on KYDS.rocks
