= WGLZ =

- West Liberty, West Virginia; United States
- Broadcast area: West Liberty, West Virginia; Tiltonsville, Ohio
- Frequency: 91.5 MHz
- Branding: 91.5 WGLZ

Programming
- Format: Top 40

Ownership
- Owner: West Liberty University

History
- First air date: 1990; 36 years ago

Technical information
- Licensing authority: FCC
- Facility ID: 71621
- Class: A
- Power: 150 Watts
- HAAT: 65 Meters
- Transmitter coordinates: 40°9′49.0″N 80°36′6.0″W

Links
- Public license information: Public file; LMS
- Website: WGLZ Online

WGLZ is a Top 40 formatted broadcast radio station licensed to West Liberty, West Virginia, serving West Liberty in West Virginia and Tiltonsville in Ohio. WGLZ is owned and operated by West Liberty University.
