= WVHC =

- Herkimer, New York; United States
- Broadcast area: Utica, New York
- Frequency: 91.5 MHz

Programming
- Format: Variety; jazz; blues

Ownership
- Owner: Herkimer County Community College

History
- First air date: October 1993; 32 years ago
- Former call signs: WHCR
- Call sign meaning: "Voice of Herkimer County"

Technical information
- Licensing authority: FCC
- Facility ID: 27032
- Class: A
- ERP: 435 watts
- HAAT: -35.0 meters
- Transmitter coordinates: 43°1′58.00″N 75°0′31.00″W

Links
- Public license information: Public file; LMS
- Webcast: Listen live
- Website: www.herkimer.edu/campus-life/wvhc-radio/

WVHC (91.5 FM) is a radio station broadcasting a variety format. Licensed to Herkimer, New York, United States, the station is owned by Herkimer County Community College and operated by the college's Radio/TV Department.

WVHC was established in 1973 under the name of WHCR as a public address system, only providing a signal to the Robert McLaughlin College Center building. In 1986, WHCR began simulcasting on the college's television station HCTV, a public-access cable TV channel airing on Group W Cable (now Charter Spectrum), the authorized cable provider for Herkimer County. The station applied for an FCC license in the early 1990s. Since the WHCR call letters were already taken by WHCR-FM in New York City, the station applied for the call letters WVHC. The application was granted in February 1993, and WVHC began operations that October.

Initially, programming was presented during class hours (7am-10pm), but in 1999 WVHC began full-time 24-hour operations. The station is best known for its jazz and blues programming, the only non-commercial station broadcasting such programming in the Mohawk Valley. It also airs a mix of student-produced programs during the fall and spring semesters. Student-produced programs are usually heard in the early afternoon, with further programs broadcast on Fridays.
