= KMOP =

Radio station in Garapan, Saipan, Northern Mariana Islands

- Garapan, Saipan; United States
- Broadcast area: Northern Mariana Islands
- Frequency: 91.5 MHz

Programming
- Format: Religious

Ownership
- Owner: Marianas Educational Media Services, Inc.
- Sister stations: KRNM

History
- First air date: December 12, 2010
- Call sign meaning: Melodies of Prayer

Technical information
- Licensing authority: FCC
- Facility ID: 176103
- Class: A
- Power: 620 watts
- Transmitter coordinates: 15°10′0″N 145°44′6″E

Links
- Public license information: Public file; LMS
- Website: Melodies Of Prayer

KMOP (91.5 FM) is a non-commercial radio station owned by Marianas Educational Media Services, Inc. Licensed to Garapan, Saipan, it airs a religious format.

The station was assigned the KMOP call letters by the Federal Communications Commission on April 27, 2011.
