= Alpha Mu Gamma =

American foreign language honor society

- ΑΜΓ
- Founded: April 29, 1931; 94 years ago Los Angeles City College
- Type: Honor
- Affiliation: Independent
- Status: Active
- Emphasis: Foreign languages
- Scope: International
- Colors: Gold
- Symbol: Scroll, Golden Bough
- Publication: Alpha Mu Gamma Newsletter
- Chapters: 347 (as of 2011)
- Headquarters: c/o Department of Modern Languages and Literatures; Fairfield University; 1073 North Benson Rd. Fairfield, Connecticut 06824; United States
- Website: Official website

Alpha Mu Gamma (ΑΜΓ) is a national collegiate foreign language honor society founded at Los Angeles City College on April 29, 1931. More than three hundred charters have been granted to chapters in the United States, Puerto Rico, and the Virgin Islands.

In January 1957, through the efforts of Sister Eloise-Therese of Sigma chapter at Mount Saint Mary's College, the week of February 16–22 was proclaimed National Foreign Language Week by President Dwight D. Eisenhower. Each successive president has continued to proclaim National Foreign Language Week, and the tradition is now celebrated in high schools, colleges and universities in the United States during the first full week of March.

The aims of Alpha Mu Gamma are to (1) recognize achievement in foreign language study, (2) nurture an interest in the study of foreign languages, literatures and civilizations, (3) stimulate a desire for linguistic attainment, and (4) foster sympathetic understanding of other peoples through the medium of languages.

Membership is generally offered to students who have a 3.0 overall grade point average and who have earned 2 A's in one foreign language, although specific membership requirements can vary; a school may raise the standards, but they cannot lower them. That is to say, the membership requirements cannot go below the nationally required 3.0 and 2 A's. In addition, students of American Sign Language and English as a second language courses may also be considered for membership.

The society organizes a biennial convention hosted by an Alpha Mu Gamma chapter. The typical convention program consists of academic presentations by student and faculty members, a banquet with a keynote speaker, and a meeting of the national executive council.
