= WTBH =

- Chiefland, Florida; United States
- Frequency: 91.5 MHz

Programming
- Format: Religious

Ownership
- Owner: Long Pond Baptist Church

History
- First air date: 1988-12-15

Technical information
- Licensing authority: FCC
- Facility ID: 38349
- Class: A
- ERP: 3,000 watts
- HAAT: 71.0 meters (232.9 ft)
- Transmitter coordinates: 29°27′35.86″N 82°53′52.44″W

Links
- Public license information: Public file; LMS

WTBH (91.5 FM) is a radio station broadcasting a Religious music format. Licensed to Chiefland, Florida, United States. The station is currently owned by Long Pond Baptist Church.
