= WHKC =

Coordinates: 39.937°N 83.021°W

Columbus, Ohio; United States
- Broadcast area: Columbus metropolitan area
- Frequency: 91.5 MHz
- Branding: Freedom FM

Programming
- Format: Christian radio

Ownership
- Owner: Christian Broadcasting Services, Inc.

History
- First air date: December 28, 2006
- Call sign meaning: Founding owner's wife's initials, Holly K. Case

Technical information
- Licensing authority: FCC
- Class: B
- Power: 15,000 watts
- ERP: 210 meters (690 ft)

Links
- Public license information: Public file; LMS
- Webcast: Listen live
- Website: www.freedomfm.org

WHKC (91.5 FM) is a non-commercial radio station licensed to Columbus, Ohio, United States. It is owned by Christian Broadcasting Services and airs a Christian format, calling itself "Freedom FM".

== History ==
On December 28, 2006, the station first signed on the air. According to FCC filings, Robert Casagrande, the President of Christian Broadcasting Services, died on October 13, 2007. His widow replaced him in that position and the FCC was notified of additional changes in the composition of the board of directors of the corporation.
