= WFHU =

- Henderson, Tennessee; United States
- Frequency: 91.5 MHz
- Branding: 91.5 the Lion

Programming
- Format: Variety

Ownership
- Owner: Freed-Hardeman University

History
- Former call signs: WFHC-FM (1979–1979); WFHC (1979–2005)

Technical information
- Licensing authority: FCC
- Facility ID: 22547
- Class: C3
- ERP: 10,500 watts
- HAAT: 94.0 meters
- Transmitter coordinates: 35°27′40.00″N 88°40′51.00″W

Links
- Public license information: Public file; LMS
- Webcast: Listen live (via iHeartRadio)
- Website: fhu.edu/fm91

WFHU (91.5 FM) is a noncommercial educational radio station licensed to Henderson, Tennessee. The station is owned by Freed-Hardeman University.

WFHU, which aired its first broadcast in 1967, operates with an effective radiated power of 10,500 watts. The station is overseen by Dr. Matt Barker, a university professor who was appointed manager in 2023.

Dubbed "The Lion" in recognition of the university's mascot, WFHU airs a wide range of music genres, including adult contemporary, classic hits, jazz, grassroots folk, country, American songbook, and classical music. On Sunday mornings and early evenings the station features several religious programs, as well as a live broadcast of worship services at the Henderson Church of Christ. WFHU also broadcasts the Freed-Hardeman Lions and Lady Lions basketball during the fall and FHU baseball and softball in the spring. In addition, the station covers Chester County High School football.

Besides its terrestrial broadcasts, WFHU streams full-time on iHeartRadio.

== History ==
The idea of a radio station was started by members of the Board of Trustees of Freed-Hardeman College in 1965 to be the core of the new Communications Department being developed. John R. Hall was chosen the first General Manager and funding for the station was partially supplied by the 'Freed-Hardeman Associates', a fund raising group associated with the college. The call letters WFHC was chosen. A student staff was collected by Mr. Hall and the initial station was built in the lower level of the Student Center. Although the staff worked to get the station operational in 1966 the first broadcast happened during 1967.

In 1979 WFHC increased its power from 10 Watts to 3000 Watts. Also the station was moved from the student center to the Bible, Communications and World Evangelism Building, now known as the Gardner Center in 1982. In 2000 the power was increased to 10,500 watts.

In 1991 WFHC hosted its 25th anniversary by hosting an open house which allowed former members of the WFHC staff to take over the station. They were joined by senior members of the staff at the time. There was also a special dinner with members of the Board of Trustees and former General Manager John R. Hall as special guests. In 2006 WFHU celebrated its 40th anniversary.

Due to the non-availability of the call sign "WFHU", which was assigned the United States Coast Guard, the call letters "WFHC" was not changed when Freed-Hardeman College went to university status in 1989. It was not until 2005 when General Manager Ron Means was able to get the call letters released by the Coast Guard, when the call letters officially changed to ""WFHU"".

The WFHU motto WFHU 91-FIVE (originally WFHC, 91-FIVE) was created by Ray Eaton, a former student staff member, former General Manager and former Director of Broadcasting for FHU. The unique logo, which had '91' with the call letters WFHC/U on top on the right side of the number, and the spelled out 'FIVE', with a line separating the call letters and FIVE, was created by student staff members David Florida and Jay Simmons in 1990.

The motto was changed a few years ago by Ron Means from 91-FIVE to the current motto of FM91.

In 2014, Freed-Hardeman laid off many staff members of the Communications department, and since then, students have had complete control of the radio station. The following year, the brand name for the station changed again from FM91 to 91.5 the Lion.
