= WLUR =

Radio station at Washington and Lee University in Lexington, Virginia

- Lexington, Virginia; United States
- Broadcast area: Metro Lexington
- Frequency: 91.5 MHz
- Branding: 91-5 WLUR

Programming
- Format: Public Radio; Variety

Ownership
- Owner: Washington and Lee University

History
- First air date: 1967
- Call sign meaning: Washington Lee University Radio

Technical information
- Licensing authority: FCC
- Facility ID: 70943
- Class: A
- Power: 175 watts
- HAAT: -51 Meters
- Transmitter coordinates: 37°47′42.0″N 79°26′49.0″W

Links
- Public license information: Public file; LMS
- Website: WLUR Online

WLUR (91.5 FM) is a Public Radio and Variety formatted broadcast radio station licensed to and serving Lexington, Virginia. WLUR is owned and operated by Washington and Lee University.

== Programming ==
WLUR broadcasts student created programming from its studios in Lexington, VA. Students are given the creativity to craft their own programming. Its frequency is 91.5 FM.

WLUR is operated by the school's Department of Journalism and Mass Communications. It broadcasts out of the Elrod Student Commons.

== Doug Harwood ==
Since the early 70s, Saturday nights on WLUR have been turned over to an alumnus, Doug Harwood. His show, which features four hours of eclectic music and no talking, has run continuously since Harwood was a student at the school. As of Fall 2025, the show still airs weekly. Much of the music is played off vinyl from Harwood's extensive collection. The formal name of his show is the Anti-Headache Machine.
