= WPJW =

- Hurricane, West Virginia; United States
- Frequency: 91.5 MHz
- Branding: WALK FM

Programming
- Format: Christian adult contemporary

Ownership
- Owner: Positive Alternative Radio, Inc.

Technical information
- Licensing authority: FCC
- Facility ID: 81513
- Class: A
- ERP: 3,000 watts
- HAAT: 92.0 meters (301.8 ft)
- Transmitter coordinates: 38°26′41.00″N 82°0′54.00″W

Links
- Public license information: Public file; LMS
- Webcast: https://christiannetcast.com/listen/player.asp?station=wpjy-fm

WPJW (91.5 FM, "WALK FM") is a radio station broadcasting a Christian adult contemporary music format. One of the 7 "WALK FM" network of stations. Licensed to Hurricane, West Virginia, United States, the station is currently owned by Positive Alternative Radio, Inc.
