= WEBT =

- Langdale, Alabama; United States
- Broadcast area: Valley, Alabama
- Frequency: 91.5 MHz

Programming
- Format: Christian

Ownership
- Owner: Langdale Educational Broadcasting Foundation

History
- First air date: 1986
- Call sign meaning: Emmanuel Baptist Temple

Technical information
- Licensing authority: FCC
- Facility ID: 36527
- Class: A
- ERP: 3,800 watts
- HAAT: 26 meters (85 feet)
- Transmitter coordinates: 32°48′15″N 85°10′43″W

Links
- Public license information: Public file; LMS
- Webcast: http://s36.myradiostream.com:4352/
- Website: http://www.webtvalley.com/

WEBT (91.5 FM) is a radio station licensed to serve Langdale, Alabama, United States. The station is owned by the Langdale Educational Broadcasting Foundation. It airs a Christian radio format. The station is run by members of Emmanuel Baptist Temple of Valley, Alabama.

The station was assigned the WEBT call letters by the Federal Communications Commission on April 8, 1985.
