= KASK =

- Fairfield, California; United States
- Frequency: 91.5 MHz
- Branding: Christian Talk Radio

Programming
- Format: Christian radio

Ownership
- Owner: Continuous Bible Talk

History
- Former call signs: KASZ (1997–1997); DKASK (1997–2000)
- Call sign meaning: King Almighty Savior King

Technical information
- Licensing authority: FCC
- Facility ID: 82104
- Class: A
- ERP: 75 watts
- HAAT: 198.0 meters (649.6 ft)
- Transmitter coordinates: 38°19′9″N 121°59′31″W

Links
- Public license information: Public file; LMS
- Website: kaskradio.com

KASK (91.5 FM) is a non-commercial radio station licensed to Fairfield, California, United States, broadcasting a Christian talk and teaching format. As of January 2009, KASK is owned by Continuous Bible Talk.

== History ==
The station was first licensed to begin broadcasting as KASZ on February 7, 1997. On May 23, 1997, the station changed its call sign to the current KASK.
