= 90.5 FM =

FM radio frequency

The following radio stations broadcast on FM frequency 90.5 MHz:

== Argentina ==
- Algarrobo in Villarino, Buenos Aires
- Amistad in Berazategui, Buenos Aires
- Chajari in Chajarí, Entre Ríos
- Concierto in Oliva, Córdoba
- Cuyen Radio in Junín, Buenos Aires
- del litoral in General Ramirez, Entre Ríos
- El Aguante in Taco Pozo, Chaco
- Factory in La Verde, Chaco
- La Voz in Campo Grande,
- Futura in La Plata, Buenos Aires
- Info Villegas in General Villegas, Buenos Aires
- Juventud in Maggiolo, Santa Fe
- LRH 356 Güemes in Juan Jose Castelli, Chaco
- La 990 Radio (Rosario) in Rosario, Santa Fe
- Libertad in Esperanza, Santa Fe
- Mitre Concepción del Uruguay in Concepción del Uruguay, Entre Ríos
- Nexo in Necochea, Buenos Aires
- NVR "la radio" in Navarro, Buenos Aires
- Nueva Vida in Villa Ángela, Chaco
- Patagonia in Carmen de Patagones, Buenos Aires
- Piuquén in San Rafael, Mendoza
- Power in General Belgrano, Buenos Aires
- Quality in Córdoba
- Radio el trébol in El Trébol, Santa Fe
- Radio María in Balcarce, Buenos Aires
- Radio María in Pascanas, Córdoba
- Radio María in General Güemes, Salta
- Radio Uno in Tucuman
- Región in Lomas de Zamora, Buenos Aires
- Sensación in Oro verde, Entre Rios
- Signos in Arribeños, Buenos Aires
- Studio in Capilla del Señor, Buenos Aires
- SunSet in Caleta Olivia, Santa Cruz
- Tribunales in Buenos Aires
- Virasoro in Goya, Corrientes

== Australia ==
- 2CCR in Sydney, New South Wales
- 2KY in Tamworth, New South Wales
- EZY FM in Lithgow, New South Wales
- Monaro FM in Cooma, New South Wales
- 4RBL - Rebel Media Co. in Gold Coast, Queensland
- 7PNN in Burnie, Tasmania
- ABC Local Radio in Queenstown, Tasmania

== Canada (Channel 213) ==
- CBAE-FM in Campbellton, New Brunswick
- CBCV-FM in Victoria, British Columbia
- CBEA-FM in Red Lake, Ontario
- CBHA-FM in Halifax, Nova Scotia
- CBLA-FM-1 in Crystal Beach, Ontario
- CBN-FM-3 in Deer Lake, Newfoundland and Labrador
- CBNJ-FM in Port Saunders, Newfoundland and Labrador
- CBQQ-FM in Fort Frances, Ontario
- CBTT-FM in Tahsis, British Columbia
- CBUF-FM-2 in Kelowna, British Columbia
- CBWB-FM in Wabowden, Manitoba
- CFCH-FM in North Bay, Ontario
- CFCR-FM in Saskatoon, Saskatchewan
- CHCK-FM in Carmacks, Yukon
- CHHJ-FM in Haines Junction, Yukon
- CHOL-FM in Old Crow, Yukon
- CHON-FM-1 in Klukshu, Yukon
- CHON-FM-2 in Takhini, Yukon
- CHON-FM-3 in Johnson's Crossing, Yukon
- CHON-FM-4 in Dease Lake, British Columbia
- CHPE-FM in Pelly Crossing, Yukon
- CHQX-FM-1 in Waskesiu Lake, Saskatchewan
- CHTE-FM in Teslin, Yukon
- CISF-FM in Swan Lake, Manitoba
- CJBE-FM in Port-Menier, Quebec
- CJMB-FM in Peterborough, Ontario
- CJPN-FM in Fredericton, New Brunswick
- CKBN-FM in Bécancour-Nicolet, Quebec
- CKRD-FM in Red Deer, Alberta
- CKSI-FM in Thunder Bay, Ontario
- CKXM-FM in Exeter, Ontario
- VF2024 in Burwash Landing, Yukon
- VF2027 in Watson Lake, Yukon
- VF2028 in Mayo, Yukon
- VF2035 in Ross River, Yukon
- VF2039 in Carcross, Yukon
- VF2049 in Dawson City, Yukon
- VF2075 in Burgeo, Newfoundland and Labrador
- VF2091 in Little Buffalo, Alberta
- VF2125 in Beaver Creek, British Columbia
- VF2126 in Keno Hill, Yukon
- VF2127 in Stewart Crossing, Yukon
- VF2128 in Tagish, Yukon
- VF2216 in Mont-Wright, Quebec
- VF2296 in Burton, British Columbia
- VF2354 in Aklavik, Northwest Territories
- VF2414 in Faro, Yukon
- VF2498 in Tsiigehtchic, Northwest Territories
- VF7090 in Zenon Park, Saskatchewan
- VF7124 in Trenton, Ontario
- VF7142 in Trenton, Ontario

== China ==
- CNR China Traffic Radio in Hunan Province and Changchun
- CNR The Voice of China in Yuxi
- CRI News Radio in Beijing
- Shenzhen Bao'an Radio Station

== Israel ==
- Kan Moreshet in Haifa, Jerusalem the Judea and Samaria Area, Netanya and Safed

== Japan ==
- TBS Radio in Tokyo

== Malaysia ==
- Ai FM in Kuala Terengganu, Terengganu
- Hot FM in Taiping, Padang Rengas, Kuala Kangsar, Parit, Terong, Batu Hampar, Kampung Segari, Sungai Siput (U), Enggor, Parit Buntar, Semanggol, Alor Pongsu, Batu Kurau, Kuala Kurau, Selama, Manjung, Sitiawan, Lumut, Pulau Pangkor, Pantai Remis, Kamunting, Changkat Jering, Matang, Simpang, Kuala Sepetang, Tanjung Piandang, Bagan Serai, Rantau Panjang Selama, Perak and Bandar Baharu, Kedah
- Minnal FM in Negeri Sembilan

== Mexico ==
- XEDA-FM in Mexico City
- XHAVE-FM in Guasave, Sinaloa
- XHCCE-FM in Chetumal, Quintana Roo
- XHCGO-FM in Ciudad Camargo, Tamaulipas
- XHCSBS-FM in Tepic, Nayarit
- XHECO-FM in Tecomán, Colima
- XHFL-FM in Ciudad Obregón, Sonora
- XHHM-FM in Ciudad Delicias, Chihuahua
- XHKF-FM in Iguala, Guerrero
- XHMZL-FM in Mazatlán, Sinaloa
- XHPCIE-FM in Cuatro Ciénegas-Monclova, Coahuila
- XHSCEE-FM in Purépero, Michoacán
- XHRUV-FM in Xalapa, Veracruz
- XHRYN-FM in Reynosa, Tamaulipas
- XHTI-FM in Tempoal, Veracruz
- XHTX-FM in Nuevo Casas Grandes, Chihuahua
- XHUDEM-FM in Monterrey (San Pedro Garza García), Nuevo León
- XHUTU-FM in Emiliano Zapata, Tabasco
- XHUVA-FM in Aguascalientes, Aguascalientes
- XHVET-FM in La Venta, Tabasco
- XHVW-FM in Acámbaro, Guanajuato
- XHXOX-FM in Oaxaca (Santa Cruz Xoxocotlán), Oaxaca
- XHYG-FM in Matías Romero, Oaxaca
- XHZIH-FM in Zihuatanejo, Guerrero

== New Zealand ==
- 1XX in Whakatāne, Bay of Plenty

== Philippines ==
- DWIX in Cauayan
- DYSB in Kalibo
- DYFL in Dumaguete

== Singapore ==
- Gold 905 in Singapore

== United States (Channel 213) ==
- KACS in Chehalis, Washington
- KAGT in Abilene, Texas
- KAIO in Idaho Falls, Idaho
- KAOG in Jonesboro, Arkansas
- KAUD in Mexico, Missouri
- KAYM in Weatherford, Oklahoma
- KBAH in Plainview, Texas
- KBEI in Brush, Colorado
- KBJF in Nephi, Utah
- KBMP in Enterprise, Kansas
- KBUW in Buffalo, Wyoming
- KBXE in Bagley, Minnesota
- KCGR in Oran, Missouri
- KCIE in Dulce, New Mexico
- KCND in Bismarck, North Dakota
- KCPL in Astoria, Oregon
- KCSU in Fort Collins, Colorado
- KDNI in Duluth, Minnesota
- KFCV in Dixon, Missouri
- KFDJ in Glendale, Utah
- KFLB in Odessa, Texas
- KFXU in Chickasha, Oklahoma
- KGDP-FM in Santa Maria, California
- KGKD in Columbus, Nebraska
- KGVV in Goltry, Oklahoma
- KGYA in Grayling, Alaska
- KHOE in Fairfield, Iowa
- KHSU in Arcata, California
- KIBC in Burney, California
- KJIC in Santa Fe, Texas
- KJLF in Butte, Montana
- KJWC in Hampton, Iowa
- KJZC in Chadron, Nebraska
- KKTO in Tahoe City, California
- KLCO in Newport, Oregon
- KLEC in Liberal, Kansas
- KLFT in Kaplan, Louisiana
- KLHW-LP in Kansas City, Missouri
- KLRE-FM in Little Rock, Arkansas
- KLXF in Modesto, California
- KLXY in Woodlake, California
- KMTJ in Columbus, Montana
- KMUC in Columbia, Missouri
- KNGA in Saint Peter, Minnesota
- KNLL in Nashville, Arkansas
- KNLM in Yucca Valley, California
- KNWV in Clarkston, Washington
- KNYD in Broken Arrow, Oklahoma
- KOGW in Hartley, Texas
- KPHL in Pahala, Hawaii
- KQBC in Benton City, Washington
- KQQA in Shelton, Nebraska
- KRBW in Ottawa, Kansas
- KSHU in Huntsville, Texas
- KSJS in San Jose, California
- KSMS in Point Lookout, Missouri
- KSOS in Las Vegas, Nevada
- KTLF in Colorado Springs, Colorado
- KTLN in Thibodaux, Louisiana
- KTRL in Stephenville, Texas
- KTXG in Greenville, Texas
- KUAT in Tucson, Arizona
- KUEU in Logan, Utah
- KUFL in Libby, Montana
- KUT in Austin, Texas
- KUWN in Newcastle, Wyoming
- KUWZ in Rock Springs, Wyoming
- KVCF in Freeman, South Dakota
- KVHS in Concord, California
- KVLB in Bend, Oregon
- KVOV in Carbondale, Colorado
- KWCW in Walla Walla, Washington
- KWMR in Point Reyes Station, California
- KXCV in Maryville, Missouri
- KXGA in Glennallen, Alaska
- KZBY in Coos Bay, Oregon
- KZET in Towaoc, Colorado
- KZFT in Fannett, Texas
- KZKL in Wichita Falls, Texas
- KZNA in Hill City, Kansas
- KZTU-FM in Tucumcari, New Mexico
- WAAJ in Benton, Kentucky
- WANM in Tallahassee, Florida
- WAOM in Mowrystown, Ohio
- WAPO in Mount Vernon, Illinois
- WAQL in McComb, Mississippi
- WASU in Boone, North Carolina
- WBER in Rochester, New York
- WBJB in Lincroft, New Jersey
- WBUX in Buxton, North Carolina
- WBVM in Tampa, Florida
- WBXL in Baldwinsville, New York
- WCBE in Columbus, Ohio
- WCGD-LP in Edgar, Nebraska
- WCKJ in Saint Johnsbury, Vermont
- WCNH in Concord, New Hampshire
- WCRH in Williamsport, Maryland
- WCSO in Columbus, Mississippi
- WCVH in Flemington, New Jersey
- WDCC in Sanford, North Carolina
- WDLL in Dillon, South Carolina
- WERG in Erie, Pennsylvania
- WESA in Pittsburgh, Pennsylvania
- WFBA in Kulpmont, Pennsylvania
- WFBM in Beaver Springs, Pennsylvania
- WGGM-LP in Fort Myers, Florida
- WGLA in Nashville, Georgia
- WHQB in Gray Court, South Carolina
- WHRW in Binghamton, New York
- WHVT in Clyde, Ohio
- WICN in Worcester, Massachusetts
- WIDA in Carolina, Puerto Rico
- WISE in Wise, Virginia
- WJFF in Jeffersonville, New York
- WJSV in Morristown, New Jersey
- WKAR in East Lansing, Michigan
- WKHS in Worton, Maryland
- WLGA in Columbus, Georgia
- WLOM in Somers Point, New Jersey
- WMEP in Camden, Maine
- WMLJ in Summersville, West Virginia
- WMTH in Park Ridge, Illinois
- WMUC in College Park, Maryland
- WMVQ in Fenner, New York
- WNIU in Rockford, Illinois
- WNPR in Meriden, Connecticut
- WPEA in Exeter, New Hampshire
- WPER in Fredericksburg, Virginia
- WPFF in Sturgeon Bay, Wisconsin
- WPHN in Gaylord, Michigan
- WPIM in Martinsville, Virginia
- WPNJ in Easton, Pennsylvania
- WPWB in Byron, Georgia
- WQOR in Laceyville, Pennsylvania
- WQRA in Greencastle, Indiana
- WQVI in Madison, Mississippi
- WRGY in Rangeley, Maine
- WRTK in Paxton, Illinois
- WRTW in Crown Point, Indiana
- WRVI in Allport, Pennsylvania
- WSCT in Springfield, Illinois
- WSLG in Gouverneur, New York
- WSLL in Saranac Lake, New York
- WSMA in Scituate, Massachusetts
- WSMC in Collegedale, Tennessee
- WSNC in Winston-Salem, North Carolina
- WSUC in Cortland, New York
- WSUP in Platteville, Wisconsin
- WTGF in Milton, Florida
- WTGX in Williamston, North Carolina
- WTHL in Somerset, Kentucky
- WTLD in Jesup, Georgia
- WTWT in Bradford, Pennsylvania
- WUMC in Elizabethton, Tennessee
- WUOG in Athens, Georgia
- WUOL in Louisville, Kentucky
- WUSC in Columbia, South Carolina
- WVBU-FM in Lewisburg, Pennsylvania
- WVBV in Medford Lakes, New Jersey
- WVCF in Eau Claire, Wisconsin
- WVFA in Lebanon, New Hampshire
- WVML in Millersburg, Ohio
- WVRD in Zebulon, North Carolina
- WVUM in Coral Gables, Florida
- WWCU in Cullowhee, North Carolina
- WWFP in Brigantine, New Jersey
- WWIL in Wilmington, North Carolina
- WXKV in Selmer, Tennessee
- WXLQ in Bristol, Vermont
- WYDI in Derry, New Hampshire
- WYFB in Gainesville, Florida
- WYQS in Mars Hill, North Carolina
- WZEV in Lineville, Alabama
- WZRN in Norlina, North Carolina
- WZXB in Bechtelsville, Pennsylvania
