= List of FM radio stations in the United States by call sign (initial letters WT–WV) =

This is a list of FM radio stations in the United States having call signs beginning with the letters WT through WV. Low-power FM radio stations, those with designations such as WTCS-LP, have not been included in this list.

== WT ==
Callsign	Frequency	City of license
WTAC	89.7 FM	Burton, Michigan
WTAI	88.9 FM	Union City, Tennessee
WTAK-FM	106.1 FM	Hartselle, Alabama
WTAO-FM	105.1 FM	Murphysboro, Illinois
WTAQ-FM	97.5 FM	Glenmore, Wisconsin
WTAX-FM	93.9 FM	Sherman, Illinois
WTAW-FM	103.5 FM	Buffalo, Texas
WTBB	89.9 FM	Gadsden, Alabama
WTBC-FM	100.3 FM	Chicago
WTBF-FM	94.7 FM	Brundidge, Alabama
WTBG	95.3 FM	Brownsville, Tennessee
WTBH	91.5 FM	Chiefland, Florida
WTBI-FM	91.5 FM	Greenville, South Carolina
WTBJ	91.3 FM	Oxford, Alabama
WTBK	105.7 FM	Manchester, Kentucky
WTBP	89.7 FM	Bath, Maine
WTBR-FM	89.7 FM	Pittsfield, Massachusetts
WTBU	95.3 FM	York Center, Maine
WTBV	101.5 FM	St. Petersburg, Florida
WTBX	93.9 FM	Hibbing, Minnesota
WTCB	106.7 FM	Orangeburg, South Carolina
WTCC	90.7 FM	Springfield, Massachusetts
WTCD	96.9 FM	Indianola, Mississippi
WTCF	103.3 FM	Wardensville, West Virginia
WTCK	90.9 FM	Charlevoix, Michigan
WTCM-FM	103.5 FM	Traverse City, Michigan
WTCQ	97.7 FM	Vidalia, Georgia
WTCR-FM	103.3 FM	Huntington, West Virginia
WTCX	96.1 FM	Ripon, Wisconsin
WTCY	88.3 FM	Greilickville, Michigan
WTDK	107.1 FM	Federalsburg, Maryland
WTDR-FM	92.7 FM	Talladega, Alabama
WTDY-FM	96.5 FM	Philadelphia
WTEB	89.3 FM	New Bern, North Carolina
WTFM	98.5 FM	Kingsport, Tennessee
WTFX-FM	93.1 FM	Clarksville, Indiana
WTGA-FM	101.1 FM	Thomaston, Georgia
WTGE	100.7 FM	Baton Rouge, Louisiana
WTGF	90.5 FM	Milton, Florida
WTGG	96.5 FM	Amite, Louisiana
WTGN	97.7 FM	Lima, Ohio
WTGR	97.5 FM	Union City, Ohio
WTGV-FM	97.7 FM	Sandusky, Michigan
WTGX	90.5 FM	Williamston, North Carolina
WTGY	95.7 FM	Charleston, Mississippi
WTGZ	95.9 FM	Tuskegee, Alabama
WTHA	88.1 FM	Berlin, New Jersey
WTHB-FM	96.9 FM	Wrens, Georgia
WTHD	105.5 FM	LaGrange, Indiana
WTHG	104.7 FM	Hinesville, Georgia
WTHI-FM	99.9 FM	Terre Haute, Indiana
WTHJ	106.5 FM	Bass River Township, New Jersey
WTHK	100.7 FM	Wilmington, Vermont
WTHL	90.5 FM	Somerset, Kentucky
WTHN	102.3 FM	Sault Ste. Marie, Michigan
WTHO-FM	101.7 FM	Thomson, Georgia
WTHP	94.3 FM	Gibson, Georgia
WTHS	89.9 FM	Holland, Michigan
WTHT	99.9 FM	Auburn, Maine
WTIB	103.7 FM	Williamston, North Carolina
WTIC-FM	96.5 FM	Hartford, Connecticut
WTID	101.7 FM	Graceville, Florida
WTIF-FM	107.5 FM	Omega, Georgia
WTIO	88.3 FM	Mainesburg, Pennsylvania
WTIP	90.7 FM	Grand Marais, Minnesota
WTIR	91.9 FM	Brighton Reservation, Florida
WTIX-FM	94.3 FM	Galliano, Louisiana
WTJB	91.7 FM	Columbus, Georgia
WTJF-FM	94.3 FM	Dyer, Tennessee
WTJK	105.3 FM	Humboldt, Tennessee
WTJS	93.1 FM	Alamo, Tennessee
WTJT	90.1 FM	Baker, Florida
WTJU	91.1 FM	Charlottesville, Virginia
WTJX-FM	93.1 FM	Charlotte Amalie, U.S. Virgin Islands
WTJY	89.5 FM	Asheboro, North Carolina
WTKB-FM	93.7 FM	Atwood, Tennessee
WTKC	89.7 FM	Findlay, Ohio
WTKD	106.5 FM	Greenville, Ohio
WTKE-FM	100.3 FM	Niceville, Florida
WTKF	107.1 FM	Atlantic, North Carolina
WTKK	106.1 FM	Knightdale, North Carolina
WTKL	91.1 FM	North Dartmouth, Massachusetts
WTKM-FM	104.9 FM	Hartford, Wisconsin
WTKN	94.5 FM	Murrells Inlet, South Carolina
WTKS-FM	104.1 FM	Cocoa Beach, Florida
WTKU-FM	98.3 FM	Petersburg, New Jersey
WTKV	105.5 FM	Minetto, New York
WTKW	99.5 FM	Bridgeport, New York
WTKX-FM	101.5 FM	Pensacola, Florida
WTKY-FM	92.1 FM	Tompkinsville, Kentucky
WTLC-FM	106.7 FM	Greenwood, Indiana
WTLD	90.5 FM	Jesup, Georgia
WTLI	89.3 FM	Bear Creek Township, Michigan
WTLP	103.9 FM	Braddock Heights, Maryland
WTLQ-FM	97.7 FM	Punta Rassa, Florida
WTLR	89.9 FM	State College, Pennsylvania
WTLX	100.5 FM	Monona, Wisconsin
WTLZ	107.1 FM	Saginaw, Michigan
WTMB	94.5 FM	Tomah, Wisconsin
WTMD	89.7 FM	Towson, Maryland
WTMG	101.3 FM	Williston, Florida
WTMI	88.7 FM	Fleming, New York
WTMK	88.5 FM	Wanatah, Indiana
WTML	91.5 FM	Tullahoma, Tennessee
WTMM-FM	104.5 FM	Mechanicville, New York
WTMP-FM	96.1 FM	Dade City, Florida
WTMT	105.9 FM	Weaverville, North Carolina
WTMX	101.9 FM	Skokie, Illinois
WTMZ-FM	98.9 FM	McClellanville, South Carolina
WTNJ	105.9 FM	Mount Hope, West Virginia
WTNM	93.7 FM	Courtland, Mississippi
WTNN	97.5 FM	Bristol, Vermont
WTNR	107.3 FM	Greenville, Michigan
WTNS-FM	99.3 FM	Coshocton, Ohio
WTNT-FM	94.9 FM	Tallahassee, Florida
WTNV	97.3 FM	Tiptonville, Tennessee
WTOC-FM	96.3 FM	Clayton, Georgia
WTOD	106.5 FM	Delta, Ohio
WTOH	98.9 FM	Upper Arlington, Ohio
WTOJ	103.1 FM	Carthage, New York
WTOK-FM	102.5 FM	San Juan, Puerto Rico
WTON-FM	94.3 FM	Staunton, Virginia
WTOP-FM	103.5 FM	Washington, D.C.
WTOS-FM	105.1 FM	Skowhegan, Maine
WTOU	96.5 FM	Portage, Michigan
WTPA-FM	93.5 FM	Mechanicsburg, Pennsylvania
WTPG	88.9 FM	Whitehouse, Ohio
WTPL	107.7 FM	Hillsborough, New Hampshire
WTPM	92.9 FM	Aguadilla, Puerto Rico
WTPN	103.9 FM	Westby, Wisconsin
WTPR-FM	101.7 FM	McKinnon, Tennessee
WTPT	93.3 FM	Forest City, North Carolina
WTQR	104.1 FM	Winston-Salem, North Carolina
WTRC-FM	95.3 FM	Niles, Michigan
WTRG	97.9 FM	Gaston, North Carolina
WTRH	93.3 FM	Ramsey, Illinois
WTRJ-FM	91.7 FM	Orange Park, Florida
WTRK	90.9 FM	Freeland, Michigan
WTRM	91.1 FM	Winchester, Virginia
WTRT	88.1 FM	Benton, Kentucky
WTRV	100.5 FM	Walker, Michigan
WTRW	94.3 FM	Carbondale, Pennsylvania
WTRY-FM	98.3 FM	Rotterdam, New York
WTRZ	107.3 FM	Spencer, Tennessee
WTSA-FM	96.7 FM	Brattleboro, Vermont
WTSC-FM	91.1 FM	Potsdam, New York
WTSE	91.1 FM	Benton, Tennessee
WTSH-FM	107.1 FM	Aragon, Georgia
WTSM	97.9 FM	Woodville, Florida
WTSR	91.3 FM	Trenton, New Jersey
WTSS	96.1 FM	Buffalo, New York
WTSU	89.9 FM	Montgomery–Troy, Alabama
WTTC-FM	95.3 FM	Towanda, Pennsylvania
WTTH	96.1 FM	Margate City, New Jersey
WTTL-FM	106.9 FM	Madisonville, Kentucky
WTTS	92.3 FM	Trafalgar, Indiana
WTTT	88.3 FM	Springfield, Illinois
WTTU	88.5 FM	Cookeville, Tennessee
WTTX-FM	107.1 FM	Appomattox, Virginia
WTTY	97.7 FM	Ty Ty, Georgia
WTUA	106.1 FM	St. Stephen, South Carolina
WTUE	104.7 FM	Dayton, Ohio
WTUF	106.3 FM	Boston, Georgia
WTUG-FM	92.9 FM	Northport, Alabama
WTUK	105.1 FM	Harlan, Kentucky
WTUL	91.5 FM	New Orleans, Louisiana
WTUP-FM	99.3 FM	Guntown, Mississippi
WTUX	101.1 FM	Gouldsboro, Maine
WTUZ	99.9 FM	Uhrichsville, Ohio
WTVR-FM	98.1 FM	Richmond, Virginia
WTVY-FM	95.5 FM	Dothan, Alabama
WTWF	93.9 FM	Fairview, Pennsylvania
WTWS	92.1 FM	Houghton Lake, Michigan
WTWT	90.5 FM	Bradford, Pennsylvania
WTWV-FM	92.9 FM	Suffolk, Virginia
WTWX-FM	95.9 FM	Guntersville, Alabama
WTXR	89.7 FM	Toccoa Falls, Georgia
WTXT	98.1 FM	Fayette, Alabama
WTYB	103.9 FM	Tybee Island, Georgia
WTYD	92.3 FM	Deltaville, Virginia
WTYE	101.7 FM	Robinson, Illinois
WTYG	91.5 FM	Sparr, Florida
WTYJ	97.7 FM	Fayette, Mississippi
WTYL-FM	97.7 FM	Tylertown, Mississippi
WTYN	91.7 FM	Lunenburg, Massachusetts
WTYS-FM	94.1 FM	Marianna, Florida
WTZB	105.9 FM	Englewood, Florida
WTZI	88.1 FM	Rosemont, Illinois
WTZM	106.1 FM	Tawas City, Michigan
WTZY	91.3 FM	Wonder Lake, Illinois

== WU ==
Callsign	Frequency	City of license
WUAG	103.1 FM	Greensboro, North Carolina
WUAL-FM	91.5 FM	Tuscaloosa, Alabama
WUAW	88.3 FM	Erwin, North Carolina
WUBA	88.1 FM	High Springs, Florida
WUBB	106.9 FM	Bluffton, South Carolina
WUBE-FM	105.1 FM	Cincinnati
WUBJ	88.1 FM	Jamestown, New York
WUBK	88.1 FM	Enoree, South Carolina
WUBL	94.9 FM	Atlanta
WUBS	89.7 FM	South Bend, Indiana
WUBT	101.1 FM	Russellville, Kentucky
WUBU	102.3 FM	New Carlisle, Indiana
WUCC	99.9 FM	Williston, South Carolina
WUCF-FM	89.9 FM	Orlando, Florida
WUCH	96.9 FM	Monterey, Tennessee
WUCL	105.7 FM	De Kalb, Mississippi
WUCS	97.9 FM	Windsor Locks, Connecticut
WUCX-FM	90.1 FM	Bay City, Michigan
WUCZ	104.1 FM	Carthage, Tennessee
WUDE	94.3 FM	Forest Acres, South Carolina
WUDR	98.1 FM	Dayton, Ohio
WUEC	89.7 FM	Eau Claire, Wisconsin
WUEZ	95.1 FM	Carterville, Illinois
WUFF-FM	97.5 FM	Eastman, Georgia
WUFL	93.1 FM	Detroit, Michigan
WUFM	88.7 FM	Columbus, Ohio
WUFN	96.7 FM	Albion, Michigan
WUFQ	88.5 FM	Cross City, Florida
WUFT-FM	89.1 FM	Gainesville, Florida
WUGA	91.7 FM	Athens, Georgia
WUGN	99.7 FM	Midland, Michigan
WUGO	102.3 FM	Grayson, Kentucky
WUHT	107.7 FM	Birmingham, Alabama
WUHU	107.1 FM	Smiths Grove, Kentucky
WUIE	105.1 FM	Lakesite, Tennessee
WUIN	98.3 FM	Oak Island, North Carolina
WUIS	91.9 FM	Springfield, Illinois
WUJC	91.1 FM	St. Marks, Florida
WUKL	106.9 FM	Masontown, Pennsylvania
WUKQ-FM	98.7 FM	Mayagüez, Puerto Rico
WUKS	107.7 FM	St. Pauls, North Carolina
WUKV	95.7 FM	Trion, Georgia
WUKY	91.3 FM	Lexington, Kentucky
WULF	94.3 FM	Hardinsburg, Kentucky
WULK	94.7 FM	Crawfordville, Georgia
WULS	103.7 FM	Broxton, Georgia
WULV	88.7 FM	Moundsville, West Virginia
WUMB-FM	91.9 FM	Boston, Massachusetts
WUMC	90.5 FM	Elizabethton, Tennessee
WUME-FM	95.3 FM	Paoli, Indiana
WUMF	91.5 FM	Farmington, Maine
WUMG	91.7 FM	Stow, Massachusetts
WUMJ	97.5 FM	Fayetteville, Georgia
WUML	91.5 FM	Lowell, Massachusetts
WUMM	91.1 FM	Machias, Maine
WUMR	106.1 FM	Philadelphia
WUMS	92.1 FM	University, Mississippi
WUMT	91.7 FM	Marshfield, Massachusetts
WUMV	88.7 FM	Milford, New Hampshire
WUMX	102.5 FM	Rome, New York
WUMZ	91.5 FM	Gloucester, Massachusetts
WUNC	91.5 FM	Chapel Hill, North Carolina
WUND-FM	88.9 FM	Manteo, North Carolina
WUNH	91.3 FM	Durham, New Hampshire
WUNV	91.7 FM	Albany, Georgia
WUNW-FM	91.1 FM	Welcome, North Carolina
WUNY	89.5 FM	Utica, New York
WUOG	90.5 FM	Athens, Georgia
WUOL-FM	90.5 FM	Louisville, Kentucky
WUOM	91.7 FM	Ann Arbor, Michigan
WUON	89.3 FM	Morris, Illinois
WUOT	91.9 FM	Knoxville, Tennessee
WUPE-FM	100.1 FM	North Adams, Massachusetts
WUPF	107.3 FM	Powers, Michigan
WUPG	96.7 FM	Republic, Michigan
WUPI	92.1 FM	Presque Isle, Maine
WUPJ	90.9 FM	Escanaba, Michigan
WUPK	94.1 FM	Marquette, Michigan
WUPM	106.9 FM	Ironwood, Michigan
WUPN	95.1 FM	Paradise, Michigan
WUPS	98.5 FM	Harrison, Michigan
WUPT	100.3 FM	Gwinn, Michigan
WUPX	91.5 FM	Marquette, Michigan
WUPY	101.1 FM	Ontonagon, Michigan
WUPZ	94.9 FM	Chocolay Township, Michigan
WURC	88.1 FM	Holly Springs, Mississippi
WURI	90.9 FM	Manteo, North Carolina
WURN-FM	107.1 FM	Key Largo, Florida
WURV	103.7 FM	Richmond, Virginia
WUSB	90.1 FM	Stony Brook, New York
WUSC-FM	90.5 FM	Columbia, South Carolina
WUSF	89.7 FM	Tampa, Florida
WUSH	106.1 FM	Poquoson, Virginia
WUSI	90.3 FM	Olney, Illinois
WUSJ	96.3 FM	Madison, Mississippi
WUSL	98.9 FM	Philadelphia
WUSM-FM	88.5 FM	Hattiesburg, Mississippi
WUSN	99.5 FM	Chicago
WUSO	89.1 FM	Springfield, Ohio
WUSQ-FM	102.5 FM	Winchester, Virginia
WUSR	99.5 FM	Scranton, Pennsylvania
WUSX	98.5 FM	Seaford, Delaware
WUSY	100.7 FM	Cleveland, Tennessee
WUSZ	99.9 FM	Virginia, Minnesota
WUTC	88.1 FM	Chattanooga, Tennessee
WUTD-FM	89.9 FM	Utuado, Puerto Rico
WUTK-FM	90.3 FM	Knoxville, Tennessee
WUTM	90.3 FM	Martin, Tennessee
WUTQ-FM	100.7 FM	Utica, New York
WUTU	88.3 FM	Sasser, Georgia
WUUA	89.5 FM	Glen Spey, New York
WUUF	103.5 FM	Sodus, New York
WUUQ	97.3 FM	South Pittsburg, Tennessee
WUUU	98.9 FM	Franklinton, Louisiana
WUVT-FM	90.7 FM	Blacksburg, Virginia
WUWF	88.1 FM	Pensacola, Florida
WUWG	90.7 FM	Carrollton, Georgia
WUWM	89.7 FM	Milwaukee, Wisconsin
WUWS	90.9 FM	Ashland, Wisconsin
WUZR	105.7 FM	Bicknell, Indiana

== WV ==
Callsign	Frequency	City of license
WVAC-FM	107.9 FM	Adrian, Michigan
WVAE	1400 AM	Biddeford, Maine
WVAF	99.9 FM	Charleston, West Virginia
WVAQ	101.9 FM	Morgantown, West Virginia
WVAS	90.7 FM	Montgomery, Alabama
WVAV	91.5 FM	Vicksburg, Michigan
WVAZ	102.7 FM	Oak Park, Illinois
WVBA	88.9 FM	Brattleboro, Vermont
WVBB	97.7 FM	Elliston-Lafayette, Virginia
WVBD	100.7 FM	Fayetteville, West Virginia
WVBE-FM	100.1 FM	Lynchburg, Virginia
WVBG-FM	105.5 FM	Redwood, Mississippi
WVBH	88.3 FM	Beach Haven West, New Jersey
WVBL	88.5 FM	Bluefield, West Virginia
WVBN	103.9 FM	Bronxville, New York
WVBO	103.9 FM	Winneconne, Wisconsin
WVBR-FM	93.5 FM	Ithaca, New York
WVBU-FM	90.5 FM	Lewisburg, Pennsylvania
WVBV	90.5 FM	Medford Lakes, New Jersey
WVBW-FM	100.5 FM	Norfolk, Virginia
WVBX	99.3 FM	Spotsylvania, Virginia
WVBY	91.7 FM	Beckley, West Virginia
WVBZ	105.7 FM	Clemmons, North Carolina
WVCF	90.5 FM	Eau Claire, Wisconsin
WVCM	91.5 FM	Iron Mountain, Michigan
WVCN	104.3 FM	Baraga, Michigan
WVCO	94.9 FM	Loris, South Carolina
WVCP	88.5 FM	Gallatin, Tennessee
WVCR-FM	88.3 FM	Loudonville, New York
WVCS	90.1 FM	Owen, Wisconsin
WVCT	91.5 FM	Keavy, Kentucky
WVCW	99.5 FM	Wilmington, Delaware
WVCX	98.9 FM	Tomah, Wisconsin
WVCY-FM	107.7 FM	Milwaukee, Wisconsin
WVDA	88.5 FM	Valdosta, Georgia
WVDS	89.5 FM	Petersburg, West Virginia
WVEE	103.3 FM	Atlanta
WVEK-FM	102.7 FM	Weber City, Virginia
WVEP	88.9 FM	Martinsburg, West Virginia
WVER-FM	107.5 FM	West Rutland, Vermont
WVES	101.5 FM	Chincoteague, Virginia
WVEZ	106.9 FM	St. Matthews, Kentucky
WVFA	90.5 FM	Lebanon, New Hampshire
WVFB	101.5 FM	Celina, Tennessee
WVFJ-FM	93.3 FM	Manchester, Georgia
WVFL	89.9 FM	Fond du Lac, Wisconsin
WVFM	106.5 FM	Kalamazoo, Michigan
WVFS	89.7 FM	Tallahassee, Florida
WVFT	93.3 FM	Gretna, Florida
WVGA	105.9 FM	Lakeland, Georgia
WVGR	104.1 FM	Grand Rapids, Michigan
WVGS	91.9 FM	Statesboro, Georgia
WVGV	89.7 FM	West Union, West Virginia
WVHC	91.5 FM	Herkimer, New York
WVHL	92.9 FM	Farmville, Virginia
WVHM	89.7 FM	Benton, Kentucky
WVHY	97.1 FM	Axson, Georgia
WVIA-FM	89.9 FM	Scranton, Pennsylvania
WVIB	100.1 FM	Holton, Michigan
WVID	90.3 FM	Añasco, Puerto Rico
WVIE	107.3 FM	Charlotte Amalie, United States Virgin Islands
WVIG	105.5 FM	West Terre Haute, Indiana
WVIJ	91.7 FM	Port Charlotte, Florida
WVIK	90.3 FM	Rock Island, Illinois
WVIL	101.3 FM	Virginia, Illinois
WVIN-FM	98.3 FM	Bath, New York
WVIP	100.5 FM	Susquehanna, Pennsylvania
WVIQ	99.5 FM	Christiansted, United States Virgin Islands
WVIS	106.1 FM	Vieques, Puerto Rico
WVIV-FM	93.5 FM	Lemont, Illinois
WVIW	104.1 FM	Bridgeport, West Virginia
WVJC	89.1 FM	Mount Carmel, Illinois
WVJP-FM	103.3 FM	Caguas, Puerto Rico
WVJZ	105.3 FM	Charlotte Amalie, United States Virgin Islands
WVKC	90.7 FM	Galesburg, Illinois
WVKF	95.7 FM	Shadyside, Ohio
WVKJ	89.9 FM	Dublin, New Hampshire
WVKL	95.7 FM	Norfolk, Virginia
WVKM	106.7 FM	Matewan, West Virginia
WVKR-FM	91.3 FM	Poughkeepsie, New York
WVKS	92.5 FM	Toledo, Ohio
WVKV	95.3 FM	Nashville, Georgia
WVKX	103.7 FM	Irwinton, Georgia
WVKY	101.7 FM	Shelbyville, Kentucky
WVLC	99.9 FM	Mannsville, Kentucky
WVLE	99.3 FM	Scottsville, Kentucky
WVLF	96.1 FM	Norwood, New York
WVLI	92.7 FM	Kankakee, Illinois
WVLK-FM	92.9 FM	Lexington, Kentucky
WVLO	99.3 FM	Cridersville, Ohio
WVLQ	101.9 FM	Port St. Joe, Florida
WVLR-FM	91.5 FM	Lyndonville, Vermont
WVLS	89.7 FM	Monterey, Virginia
WVLT-FM	92.1 FM	Vineland, New Jersey
WVLY-FM	100.9 FM	Milton, Pennsylvania
WVMC-FM	90.7 FM	Mansfield, Ohio
WVMD	100.1 FM	Romney, West Virginia
WVME	91.9 FM	Meadville, Pennsylvania
WVMJ	104.5 FM	Conway, New Hampshire
WVML	90.5 FM	Millersburg, Ohio
WVMM	90.7 FM	Grantham, Pennsylvania
WVMN	90.1 FM	New Castle, Pennsylvania
WVMR-FM	91.9 FM	Hillsboro, West Virginia
WVMS	89.5 FM	Sandusky, Ohio
WVMU	91.7 FM	Ashtabula, Ohio
WVMV	91.5 FM	China Township, Michigan
WVMW-FM	91.7 FM	Scranton, Pennsylvania
WVMX	107.9 FM	Westerville, Ohio
WVNA-FM	105.5 FM	Muscle Shoals, Alabama
WVNH	91.1 FM	Concord, New Hampshire
WVNI	95.1 FM	Nashville, Indiana
WVNK	91.1 FM	Manchester, Vermont
WVNL	91.7 FM	Vandalia, Illinois
WVNN-FM	92.5 FM	Trinity, Alabama
WVNO-FM	106.1 FM	Mansfield, Ohio
WVNP	89.9 FM	Wheeling, West Virginia
WVNU	97.5 FM	Greenfield, Ohio
WVNW	96.7 FM	Burnham, Pennsylvania
WVOB	91.3 FM	Dothan, Alabama
WVOD	99.1 FM	Manteo, North Carolina
WVOF	88.5 FM	Fairfield, Connecticut
WVOH-FM	93.5 FM	Nicholls, Georgia
WVOI	91.5 FM	Everglades City, Florida
WVOK-FM	97.9 FM	Oxford, Alabama
WVOM-FM	103.9 FM	Howland, Maine
WVOR	102.3 FM	Canandaigua, New York
WVOS-FM	95.9 FM	Liberty, New York
WVOW-FM	101.9 FM	Logan, West Virginia
WVPA	88.5 FM	St. Johnsbury, Vermont
WVPB	88.5 FM	Charleston, West Virginia
WVPE	88.1 FM	Elkhart, Indiana
WVPG	90.3 FM	Parkersburg, West Virginia
WVPH	90.3 FM	Piscataway, New Jersey
WVPM	90.9 FM	Morgantown, West Virginia
WVPO	96.7 FM	Lehman Township, Pennsylvania
WVPR	89.5 FM	Windsor, Vermont
WVPS	107.9 FM	Burlington, Vermont
WVPW	88.9 FM	Buckhannon, West Virginia
WVQM	101.3 FM	Augusta, Maine
WVRA	107.3 FM	Enfield, North Carolina
WVRB	95.3 FM	Wilmore, Kentucky
WVRC-FM	104.7 FM	Spencer, West Virginia
WVRD	90.5 FM	Zebulon, North Carolina
WVRE	101.1 FM	Dickeyville, Wisconsin
WVRH	94.3 FM	Norlina, North Carolina
WVRI	90.9 FM	Clifton Forge, Virginia
WVRK	102.9 FM	Columbus, Georgia
WVRL	88.3 FM	Elizabeth City, North Carolina
WVRN	88.9 FM	Wittenberg, Wisconsin
WVRP	91.1 FM	Roanoke Rapids, North Carolina
WVRQ-FM	102.3 FM	Viroqua, Wisconsin
WVRR	88.1 FM	Point Pleasant, West Virginia
WVRS	90.1 FM	Gore, Virginia
WVRT	97.7 FM	Mill Hall, Pennsylvania
WVRU-FM	89.9 FM	Radford, Virginia
WVRV	97.5 FM	Pine Level, Alabama
WVRW	107.7 FM	Glenville, West Virginia
WVRX	104.9 FM	Strasburg, Virginia
WVRZ	99.7 FM	Mount Carmel, Pennsylvania
WVSB	106.3 FM	South Bend, Indiana
WVSC	103.1 FM	Port Royal, South Carolina
WVSD	91.7 FM	Itta Bena, Mississippi
WVSE	91.9 FM	Christiansted, United States Virgin Islands
WVSH	91.9 FM	Huntington, Indiana
WVSI	88.9 FM	Mt. Vernon, Illinois
WVSP-FM	94.1 FM	Yorktown, Virginia
WVSQ	106.9 FM	Renovo, Pennsylvania
WVSR-FM	102.7 FM	Charleston, West Virginia
WVSS	90.7 FM	Menomonie, Wisconsin
WVST-FM	91.3 FM	Petersburg, Virginia
WVSZ	107.3 FM	Chesterfield, South Carolina
WVTC	90.7 FM	Randolph Center, Vermont
WVTF	89.1 FM	Roanoke, Virginia
WVTI	106.9 FM	Brighton, Vermont
WVTK	92.1 FM	Port Henry, New York
WVTQ	95.1 FM	Sunderland, Vermont
WVTR	91.9 FM	Marion, Virginia
WVTU	89.3 FM	Charlottesville, Virginia
WVTX	88.7 FM	Colchester, Vermont
WVTY	92.1 FM	Racine, Wisconsin
WVTW	88.5 FM	Charlottesville, Virginia
WVUA-FM	90.7 FM	Tuscaloosa, Alabama
WVUB	91.1 FM	Vincennes, Indiana
WVUD	91.3 FM	Newark, Delaware
WVUM	90.5 FM	Coral Gables, Florida
WVUR-FM	95.1 FM	Valparaiso, Indiana
WVUV-FM	103.1 FM	Fagaitua, American Samoa
WVVC-FM	88.1 FM	Dolgeville, New York
WVVI-FM	93.5 FM	Christiansted, United States Virgin Islands
WVVR	100.3 FM	Hopkinsville, Kentucky
WVVS-FM	90.9 FM	Valdosta, Georgia
WVVV	96.9 FM	Williamstown, West Virginia
WVWC	92.1 FM	Buckhannon, West Virginia
WVWG	88.9 FM	Seelyville, Indiana
WVWS	89.3 FM	Webster Springs, West Virginia
WVWV	89.9 FM	Huntington, West Virginia
WVXG	95.1 FM	Mount Gilead, Ohio
WVXL	100.7 FM	Christiansburg, Virginia
WVXR	102.1 FM	Randolph, Vermont
WVXS	104.1 FM	Romney, West Virginia
WVXU	91.7 FM	Cincinnati
WVYA	89.7 FM	Williamsport, Pennsylvania
WVYB	103.3 FM	Holly Hill, Florida
WVYC	88.1 FM	York, Pennsylvania
WVYN	90.9 FM	Bluford, Illinois
WVZA	92.7 FM	Herrin, Illinois

== See also ==
- North American call sign
