= WSIZ-FM =

- Jacksonville, Georgia; United States
- Broadcast area: Fitzgerald, Georgia
- Frequency: 102.3 MHz
- Branding: My FM

Programming
- Format: Classic hits

Ownership
- Owner: Middle Georgia Community Radio
- Sister stations: WGSW; WTTY; WVHY

History
- First air date: 2010

Technical information
- Licensing authority: FCC
- Facility ID: 165953
- Class: A
- ERP: 5,500 watts
- HAAT: 102 meters (335 ft)
- Transmitter coordinates: 31°46′42.7″N 83°5′6.3″W

Links
- Public license information: Public file; LMS

WSIZ-FM (102.3 FM) is a radio station licensed to Jacksonville, Georgia. The station broadcasts a classic hits format and is owned by Middle Georgia Community Radio.

48dbu signal map of WSIZ-FM 102.3 Jacksonville GA
