= WVHM =

WVHM may refer to:

- WVHM (FM), a radio station (89.7 FM) licensed to serve Benton, Kentucky, United States
- WAAJ (FM), a radio station (90.5 FM) licensed to serve Benton, which held the call sign WVHM from 1989 to 2023
