= WAAJ =

WAAJ may refer to:

- WAAJ (FM), a radio station (90.5 FM) licensed to serve Benton, Kentucky, United States
- WVHM (FM), a radio station (89.7 FM) licensed to serve Benton, which held the call sign WAAJ from 1996 to 2023
- WLOR, a radio station (1550 AM) licensed to serve Huntsville, Alabama, United States, which held the call sign WAAJ from April 1989 to April 1993
- Tampa Padang Airport, in Mamuju, West Sulawesi, Indonesia
