= WHEM =

WHEM may refer to:

- Women’s Health in Emergency Medicine, a subspecialty of Emergency Medicine
- WHEM (FM), a radio station (91.3 FM) licensed to Eau Claire, Wisconsin, United States
- The Western Hemisphere, a geographical term for the half of the Earth that lies west of the Prime Meridian.
