= XHFL-FM =

Two Mexican radio stations bear the XHFL-FM callsign:

- XHFL-FM (Guanajuato), 90.7 FM "Radio Santa Fe" in Guanajuato, Guanajuato (combo with XEFL-AM)
- XHFL-FM (Sonora), 90.5 FM "La Invasora" in Ciudad Obregón, Sonora
