= WUPX =

WUPX may refer to:

- WUPX (FM), a radio station (91.5 FM) licensed to Marquette, Michigan, United States
- WUPX-TV, a television station (channel 25, virtual 67) licensed to Richmond, Kentucky, United States
