= WZBN =

WZBN may refer to:

- WZBN (FM), a radio station (105.5 FM) licensed to Camilla, Georgia, United States
- WPHY-CD, a television station (channel 50/PSIP 25) licensed to Trenton, New Jersey, United States, known on the air as WZBN-TV
