= KCSU =

KCSU may refer to:

- KCSU-FM, a radio station (90.5 FM) licensed to Fort Collins, Colorado, United States
- King's College Student Union
