= XHYG-FM =

Radio station in Matías Romero, Oaxaca, Mexico

Matías Romero, Oaxaca, Mexico; Mexico
- Frequency: 90.5 MHz
- Branding: La Ke Buena

Programming
- Format: Regional Mexican
- Affiliations: Radiópolis

Ownership
- Owner: CMI Oaxaca; (Complejo Satelital, S.A. de C.V.)

History
- First air date: June 6, 1970 (concession)

Technical information
- ERP: 25 kW
- Transmitter coordinates: 16°52′49″N 95°02′03″W

Links
- Webcast: Listen live
- Website: encuentroradiotv.com

XHYG-FM is a radio station on 90.5 FM in Matías Romero, Oaxaca, Mexico. It is part of CMI, the media company owned by the López Lena family, and carries its La Ke Buena Regional Mexican format from Radiópolis.

== History ==
XEYG-AM 660 received its concession on June 6, 1970. It was owned by Marcelino Martínez Moreno.

XEYG received approval to migrate to FM in 2011.
