= WYUM =

- Mount Vernon, Georgia; United States
- Frequency: 101.7 MHz

Programming
- Format: Country music
- Affiliations: ABC Radio, Jones Radio Network

Ownership
- Owner: Dennis Jones; (RadioJones, LLC)
- Sister stations: WTCQ; WVOP

Technical information
- Licensing authority: FCC
- Facility ID: 86166
- Class: A
- ERP: 3,600 watts
- HAAT: 130.0 meters
- Transmitter coordinates: 32°13′12.00″N 82°26′7.00″W

Links
- Public license information: Public file; LMS
- Website: southeastgeorgiatoday.com

WYUM (101.7 FM) is a radio station broadcasting a country music format. Licensed to Mount Vernon, Georgia, United States. The station is currently owned by Dennis Jones, through licensee RadioJones, LLC, and features programming from ABC Radio and Jones Radio Network.

Former logo
