= XHTX-FM =

Radio station in Nuevo Casas Grandes, Chihuahua

XHTX-FM / XETX-AM
- Nuevo Casas Grandes, Chihuahua; Mexico
- Frequency: 90.5 FM / 540 AM
- Branding: La Ranchera de Paquimé

Programming
- Format: Ranchera

Ownership
- Owner: Grupo BM Radio; (Eber Joel Beltrán Zamarrón)
- Sister stations: XHNVG-FM

History
- First air date: November 23, 1948

Technical information
- Licensing authority: CRT
- Class: B1 (FM); B (AM)
- Power: 3,900 Watts day/.700 watts night
- ERP: 25 kW
- HAAT: 84.93 m (278.6 ft)
- Transmitter coordinates: 30°22′16.39″N 107°58′51.04″W

Links
- Webcast: Listen live
- Website: gbmradio.com

XHTX-FM/XETX-AM is a radio station on 90.5 FM and 540 AM in Nuevo Casas Grandes, Chihuahua, Mexico. It is owned by Grupo BM Radio and is known as La Ranchera de Paquimé with a ranchera format.

== History ==
Previous logo

XETX-AM received its concession on November 23, 1948. It initially broadcast with 250 watts at 1400 kHz and was owned by Don Laureano Francisco Molinar Contreras. By the 1960s, XETX was on 1010 kHz with a daytime power of one kilowatt. In the early 2000s, XETX moved to 540 and increased its power to 3,900 watts day and 700 night.

In April 2012, XETX was authorized to migrate to FM on 90.5 MHz. In 2017, further technical modifications were authorized for the station including a relocation of the transmitter site. XETX-AM is one of the radio stations that has a continuity obligation in Mexico that requires it to remain in service for a total of 33,056 people who would not otherwise receive service in 376 unique locations as of 2018.
