= XHPCIE-FM =

Radio station in Cuatro Ciénegas–Monclova, Coahuila

- Cuatro Ciénegas, Coahuila; Mexico
- Frequency: 90.5 FM
- Branding: La Primera

Programming
- Format: Regional Mexican

Ownership
- Owner: Grupo Zócalo Monclova; (José David Juaristi Santos)

History
- First air date: November 2017
- Call sign meaning: Cuatro Ciénegas

Technical information
- Licensing authority: CRT
- Class: B1
- ERP: 25 kW
- HAAT: −83.8 m (−275 ft)
- Transmitter coordinates: 26°53′43″N 101°53′30″W

Links
- Website: XHPCIE-FM on Facebook

XHPCIE-FM is a radio station on 90.5 FM in Cuatro Ciénegas, Coahuila, Mexico. It is known as La Primera and owned by Grupo Zócalo.

== History ==
XHPCIE was awarded in the IFT-4 radio auction of 2017 — the only new FM station in Coahuila as a result of the auction — and came to air with test programs in November 2017. The regular grupera programming began at the end of the year.
