= XHZIH-FM =

Radio station in Zihuatanejo, Guerrero, Mexico

- Zihuatanejo, Guerrero; Mexico
- Frequency: 90.5 MHz
- Branding: Estéreo Vida

Programming
- Format: Spanish ballads

Ownership
- Owner: Radiorama; (Multiestereofónica, S.A. de C.V.)

History
- First air date: November 28, 1988 (concession)
- Call sign meaning: ZIHuatanejo

Technical information
- ERP: 14.15 kW

Links
- Webcast: Listen live
- Website: estereovida.mx

XHZIH-FM is a radio station on 90.5 FM in Zihuatanejo, Guerrero, Mexico. It is owned by Radiorama and carries its Estéreo Vida format.

== History ==
XHZIH received its concession on November 28, 1988.
