= XHKF-FM =

Radio station in Iguala, Guerrero

Currently silent

Iguala, Guerrero; Mexico
- Frequency: 90.5 MHz

Programming
- Format: Silent

Ownership
- Owner: Grupo Radio Centro; (Grupo Radiodigital Siglo XXI, S.A. de C.V.)

History
- First air date: October 16, 1947 (concession)

Technical information
- ERP: 25 kW
- Transmitter coordinates: 18°21′12.43″N 99°30′42.45″W

XHKF-FM is a radio station on 90.5 FM in Iguala, Guerrero. It is owned by Grupo Radio Centro.

== History ==
XEKF-AM 1360 received its concession on October 16, 1947. It was owned by Rafael Campos Marquina until 1977, when it was sold to Radio XEKF, S.A.

In 2004, XEKF was sold to Grupo Radio Capital. Capital, in turn, sold the station in 2008 to Grupo Radio México.

XEKF was cleared for AM-FM migration in 2010 as XHKF-FM 90.5. Official promotions, however, do not mention the FM station.
