= XHMZL-FM =

Radio station in Mazatlán, Sinaloa

Mazatlán, Sinaloa; Mexico
- Frequency: 90.5 FM
- Branding: Radio Cultura

Programming
- Format: Cultural

Ownership
- Owner: Instituto Cultural de Occidente, A.C.

History
- First air date: October 14, 1991
- Call sign meaning: MaZatLán

Technical information
- ERP: 5 kW
- Transmitter coordinates: 23°11′55″N 106°25′20″W

Links
- Website: www.radiocultura.org.mx

XHMZL-FM is a radio station on 90.5 FM in Mazatlán, Sinaloa. It is owned by the Instituto Cultural de Occidente, a Catholic primary and secondary school in Mazatlán, and is known as Radio Cultura.

== History ==
XHMZL took to the air on October 14, 1991. Originally permitted for 1 kW, it now broadcasts with 5.

XHMZL does not appear in the most recent IFT table release, dated March 31, 2016, likely because it failed to apply to transition to a social use concession.
