= CKBN-FM =

Radio station in Bécancour, Quebec

Coordinates: 46°17′04″N 72°32′01″W

- Bécancour, Quebec; Canada
- Frequency: 90.5 MHz (HD Radio)
- Branding: VIA 90,5

Programming
- Language: French

Ownership
- Owner: Cooperative de solidarite Radio Communau

History
- First air date: May 8, 2007

Technical information
- Class: C1
- ERP: 26.8 kWs average 60 kWs peak
- HAAT: 35.8 metres (117 ft)

Links
- Webcast: CKBN-FM Listen Online

CKBN-FM is a french language community radio station that operates at 90.5 FM in Bécancour, Quebec, Canada. The station was licensed in 2004, and started operations on May 8, 2007. It was rebranded as "VIA 90.5" on August 20, 2018. It's also broadcasting over HD Radio, on 90.1-1.

The station is a member of the Association des radiodiffuseurs communautaires du Québec.
