= WVOP =

- Vidalia, Georgia; United States
- Frequency: 970 kHz
- Branding: News Talk 970

Programming
- Format: News/Talk
- Affiliations: ABC Radio, Jones Radio Network

Ownership
- Owner: Dennis Jones; (RadioJones, LLC)
- Sister stations: WTCQ; WYUM

Technical information
- Licensing authority: FCC
- Facility ID: 70116
- Class: D
- Power: 4,000 watts day 60 watts night
- Transmitter coordinates: 32°13′12.00″N 82°26′7.00″W
- Translator: 105.3 W287CR (Vidalia)

Links
- Public license information: Public file; LMS
- Website: southeastgeorgiatoday.com

WVOP (970 AM) is a radio station broadcasting a talk format and licensed to Vidalia, Georgia, United States. The station is currently owned by Dennis Jones, through licensee RadioJones, LLC, and features programming from ABC Radio and Jones Radio Network.

Former logo

On February 1, 2010, WVOP changed format from oldies to news and talk.
