= XHTI-FM =

Radio station in Tempoal–Tantoyuca, Veracruz, Mexico

- Tempoal, Veracruz; Mexico
- Broadcast area: Tempoal and Tantoyuca, Veracruz
- Frequency: 90.5 FM
- RDS: HUASTECA
- Branding: La Huasteca

Programming
- Format: Regional Mexican
- Affiliations: Grupo Radiorama

Ownership
- Owner: Grupo AS; (Radiodifusión, S.A.)

History
- First air date: July 10, 1964 (concession)
- Former frequencies: 1430 kHz (1964-1989), 750 kHz (1990-2014)

Technical information
- Class: B
- ERP: 25,000 watts (FM)
- HAAT: 53.99 meters
- Transmitter coordinates: 21°31′20″N 98°22′50″W

Links
- Webcast: Listen live
- Website: lahuastecafm.com

XHTI-FM is a radio station on 90.5 FM in Tempoal, Veracruz, also serving Tantoyuca. It is owned by Grupo AS, one of the largest regional affiliation partners of Grupo Radiorama. It is known as La Huasteca and carries a Regional Mexican format.

== History ==
XETI-AM on 1430 kHz received its concession on July 10, 1964. In the 1990s, it was moved to 750 kHz which allowed it a major power increase and the ability to begin broadcasting at night.

It was authorized to migrate to FM in 2010.
