= XHHM-FM =

Radio station in Ciudad Delicias, Chihuahua

- Ciudad Delicias, Chihuahua; Mexico
- Broadcast area: Ciudad Delicias, Chihuahua
- Frequency: 90.5 FM
- Branding: La Caliente

Programming
- Format: Grupera

Ownership
- Owner: GRD Multimedia; (XEHM, S.A.)

History
- First air date: February 11, 1964 (concession)

Technical information
- Licensing authority: CRT
- Class: B1
- ERP: 25 kW
- HAAT: 26.1 m (86 ft)
- Transmitter coordinates: 28°09′53″N 105°28′18″W

Links
- Website: www.lacalientefm.com.mx

XHHM-FM is a radio station on 90.5 FM in Ciudad Delicias, Chihuahua. The station is owned by GRD Multimedia and carries a grupera format known as La Caliente.

== History ==
XHHM began as XEHM-AM 1480, receiving its concession on February 11, 1964. It was owned by Lilian Calderón de Guillemot and broadcast as a daytimer for most of its history. In 1976, operation was transferred to XEHM, S.A.

It migrated to FM in 2011.
