= WTTY =

- Ty Ty, Georgia; United States
- Broadcast area: Albany, Georgia
- Frequency: 97.7 MHz
- Branding: 97.7 The Beat

Programming
- Format: Urban adult contemporary
- Affiliations: Premiere Networks

Ownership
- Owner: Mount Olive Broadcasting; (Greater 2nd Mt. Olive Missionary Baptist Church)
- Sister stations: WGSW; WZBN

History
- First air date: August 21, 2015; 10 years ago
- Call sign meaning: Ty Ty, Georgia

Technical information
- Licensing authority: FCC
- Facility ID: 190401
- Class: A
- ERP: 1,550 watts
- HAAT: 200 meters
- Transmitter coordinates: 31°38′22.0″N 83°44′58.00″W
- Translator: 98.1 W251AU (Ocilla)

Links
- Public license information: Public file; LMS

WTTY (97.7 FM) is a commercial radio station licensed in the US to Ty Ty, Georgia. WTTY is part of a group of Mount Olive Broadcasting Group playing Urban Adult Contemporary Music, branded as 97.7 The Beat, since 2022. It airs the Steve Harvey Morning Show.
