= KAGT =

Air 1 radio station in Abilene, Texas

Coordinates: 32.510°N 99.741°W

Abilene, Texas; United States
- Frequency: 90.5 MHz
- Branding: Air 1

Programming
- Format: Christian Worship
- Affiliations: Air1

Ownership
- Owner: Educational Media Foundation

History
- First air date: 2003
- Call sign meaning: Abilene Gospel Texas

Technical information
- Licensing authority: FCC
- Class: C1
- ERP: 100,000 Watts

Links
- Public license information: Public file; LMS
- Website: air1.com

KAGT (90.5 FM) is a radio station and affiliate of the Air 1 network, playing Christian Worship music.

== History ==
KAGT was originally a Southern gospel radio station that served the Abilene, Texas, area. The call letters were originally intended to be an acronym for Kings All Gospel Talk. The station was owned by Gospel Radio Network until December 2006 when the license was transferred to the Educational Media Foundation. Prior to changing to 90.5, it was KAGT 95.1. Its programming schedule consisted of "The Wake Up show" hosted by Tim Walker, "the Afternoon Coffee Break", hosted by Mike Coffey and "Late with Tate", hosted by Tate Ellison. Tate Ellison went on to DJ at the affiliate station in Nashville, TN for a time before returning a short while to KAGT.

=== Call Letter History ===
KAGT 1490 (in SKAGiT County, WA) was an AM radio station located in Anacortes, Washington, from 1957 until 1987 when the station's owner at the time, Bill Berry, opted to embrace his own Irish heritage and rebrand the station at 1340 with the calls KLKI and market the station as "Lucky 13" before dropping that in favor of simply "1340 KLKI." Prior to the call change, AM KAGT billed itself "The Voice of Skagit County". The same station, had yet another call change to KWLE in 2007, branding itself as "The Whale." This station has been sold, from San Juan Communications to New Age Media, along with AM 1110 KRPA (formerly KWDB Oak Harbor) and it is speculated that it will become a foreign language rimshot station, aiming non-English, non-American programming to Victoria, B.C., Canada. The call letters KAGT became available in 2007 for this station to use.
