= WGSW =

Simulcasting WZBN Camilla
- Americus, Georgia; United States
- Broadcast area: Albany, Georgia
- Frequency: 106.9 MHz
- Branding: Praise 105.5 & 106.9

Programming
- Format: Traditional and Urban contemporary gospel

Ownership
- Owner: Olive Broadcasting Network; (Greater 2nd Mt. Olive Missionary Baptist Church)
- Sister stations: WTTY; WZBN

History
- First air date: September 19, 2015; 10 years ago

Technical information
- Licensing authority: FCC
- Facility ID: 191567
- Class: A
- ERP: 6,000 watts
- HAAT: 55 meters
- Transmitter coordinates: 32°05′03.0″N 84°14′35.00″W

Links
- Public license information: Public file; LMS
- Webcast: Listen live
- Website: praise1055.com

WGSW is a commercial FM Broadcast Radio Station licensed in the US to Americus, Georgia. WGSW is airing a traditional gospel and urban contemporary gospel format, simulcasting WZBN 105.5 FM Camilla, and is owned by Olive Broadcasting Network, through licensee Greater 2nd Mt. Olive Missionary Baptist Church.

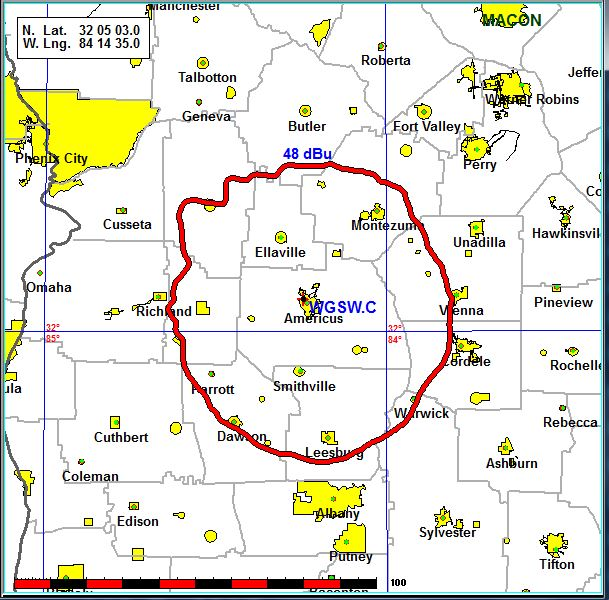
WGSW 48 DBU

On November 28, 2022, WGSW changed their format from classic hits (simulcasting WSIZ-FM) to a simulcast of gospel-formatted WZBN 105.5 FM Camilla.

In popular culture, the call sign was used for a fictional New York television station (Channel 8) in Ghostbusters (2016).

== Previous logo ==
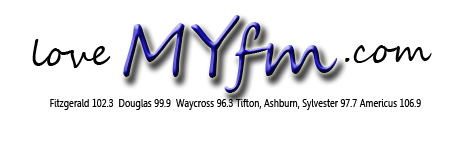
