= WUEC =

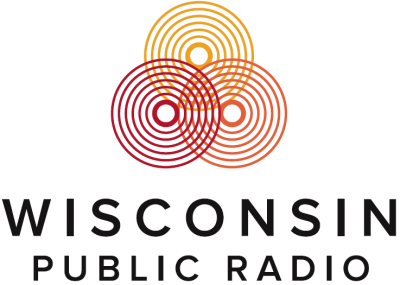
- Eau Claire, Wisconsin; United States
- Frequency: 89.7 MHz

Programming
- Format: Public radio, classical music
- Network: Wisconsin Public Radio (WPR Music)
- Affiliations: NPR, American Public Media

Ownership
- Owner: Board of Regents of the University of Wisconsin System

History
- First air date: October 27, 1975
- Call sign meaning: Wisconsin Eau Claire

Technical information
- Licensing authority: FCC
- Facility ID: 4282
- Class: C3
- ERP: 5,200 watts
- HAAT: 192 m (630 ft)
- Transmitter coordinates: 44°47′59.9″N 91°27′57″W

Links
- Public license information: Public file; LMS
- Webcast: Listen Live
- Website: wpr.org

WUEC (89.7 FM) is a radio station in Eau Claire, Wisconsin, United States. The station is part of Wisconsin Public Radio (WPR) and broadcasts its WPR Music service consisting of classical and jazz music with news updates. WUEC also broadcasts local programming from studios in the Wisconsin Public Broadcasting regional center in Eau Claire and three hours of student programming a week from studios in the Hibbard Humanities building at the University of Wisconsin–Eau Claire (UW-EC).

WUEC first went on air on October 27, 1975, as the student-run radio station at UW-EC, which was the last university in the University of Wisconsin System at the time to get such a station. In its early years, it was a limited-power, 10-watt operation that only broadcast during the school year. The station slowly increased its hours of operation as well as its power and coverage area.

In 1989, WUEC added programming from Wisconsin Public Radio to its lineup, at first in the mornings and later during daytime hours. At the time, WPR was moving toward offering two program services but only had one frequency in the Eau Claire area. In 1992, it opted to favor the relationship with WUEC over a permit it held to build a second Eau Claire frequency, which was sold to Christian radio broadcaster Fourth Dimension and put on the air as WHEM three years later. WUEC's primary format of alternative rock music was replaced in 1996 with jazz during student hours as WPR programming occupied more and more of the station's broadcast day, and student involvement fell off after that. UW-EC student-produced programming now only occupies a three-hour block on Monday nights.

== Student radio at UW-Eau Claire ==
A carrier current radio station, audible only in campus dormitories, had operated at the University of Wisconsin-Eau Claire (UW-EC) since December 10, 1962. It was initially known as WSCB ("Wisconsin State Campus Broadcast") and changed to WSUR in 1965. (Note: This followed Wisconsin State College at Eau Claire being granted university status as Wisconsin State University-Eau Claire in 1964. In 1971, the Wisconsin State University System was merged into the University of Wisconsin System, and the name changed accordingly.)

By 1973, station staff were formulating a proposal to convert the carrier current station to an FM broadcast operation. At the time, UW-Eau Claire was the last state university to not have its own radio station. The Board of Regents of the University of Wisconsin System applied to the Federal Communications Commission (FCC) on August 22, 1974, for authority to build a 10-watt radio station; this was approved on December 6. WUEC began broadcasting on October 27, 1975, from a transmitter atop the 10-story Women's Towers dormitory. It originally operated on mornings and evenings Monday through Friday and Saturday afternoons and evenings, for a total of 78 hours a week. Some 50 students staffed the station. In 1977, the station began broadcasting on Sundays, and it expanded its broadcasting to mornings in 1983. Previously, the station was off the air in midday so students could attend classes and handle production tasks. Throughout this time, WUEC only operated during the school year because it lacked the money to pay someone to run it during the summer.

In its early years, WUEC offered a mixture of local student-produced programming, particularly album-oriented rock, and recorded educational programs as well as classical music. The latter two items helped the station meet a UW System–mandated educational content quota. Programs also included student-gathered newscasts as well as UW-Eau Claire athletic events, though telephone line charges caused this output to be severely curtailed in 1984.

In 1978, the FCC made policy changes that encouraged 10-watt, Class D radio stations like WUEC—the last 10-watt station in the UW System—to upgrade their signals or face being bumped by new stations. As a result, the university filed for a power increase to 750 watts. The new transmitter went into service in November 1979, expanding WUEC's coverage area and introducing stereo broadcasting. It was located off campus on the tower of television station WEAU.

== As a WPR station ==
By the late 1980s, Wisconsin Public Radio (WPR) was starting to move toward offering two program services in much of the state. In western Wisconsin, it was hampered by having just one frequency: WHWC (88.3 FM), which aired a mix of classical music and news and information programming. Listeners in the region did not have access to all of WPR's news programming as a result. In part to offer dual service, WPR began establishing connections with campus-owned radio stations at UW-Green Bay (WGBW) and Lawrence University in Appleton (WLFM). These stations began part-time simulcasts of WPR programming. A third station, WVSS at UW-Stout in Menomonie, was also increasingly turning over its time to WPR.

On June 19, 1989, WUEC began offering WPR's morning classical music programming. This brought Morning Concert back to western Wisconsin after WHWC replaced it with talk the year before, generating outcry from listeners and leading to a member of the WPR advisory board contacting WUEC director Robert Bailey. The arrangement extended that December to include WPR's Afternoon Concert. In total, WUEC aired WPR programming for seven hours on weekday mornings and afternoons plus five hours on Sundays. WUEC eliminated most of its talk programming to retain a similar output of its own music programming. While WPR had filed for a second frequency of its own in Eau Claire, the WUEC arrangement was seen as providing better coverage, if not full-time service. In 1992, the State of Wisconsin Educational Communications Board sold the permit for the second frequency, WHEM 91.3, to Christian radio broadcaster Fourth Dimension, Inc.

Beginning in 1990, WPR supplied most of WUEC's programming before 4 p.m. seven days a week, as well as when classes were not in session at UW-Eau Claire. Meanwhile, WUEC continued to offer student programming after 4 p.m. during the school year, including a weekly sports show and blocks of rock, folk, jazz, and heavy metal music.

In June 1994, the student music was moved back to start at 6 p.m. so WUEC could air All Things Considered in full. That fall, the primary music format for WUEC's student-produced programming was changed from alternative rock to jazz. The move was made in order to make the station's local programming more compatible with WPR's classical music and talk, but it generated concern from students upset that bands like The Black Crowes and Soundgarden would not be played on local airwaves.

In the years following the format change, WUEC withered away as a visible entity on the UW-Eau Claire campus. In February 2002, a late budget proposal led the Student Senate to deny funding for the station; in the 2001–02 school year, the station had just one student manager and a faculty director, both of whom left the university. In 2003, WPR's regional manager became WUEC's new manager under an agreement between WPR and UW-Eau Claire. In 2005, a new student-produced show, Blugold Performance of the Air, debuted to showcase campus music groups. A new rock show, Local Independence—inspired by radio station The Current in Minneapolis—debuted in 2007. By that time, the station's local programming was confined to Sunday nights.

In 2016, the UW-Eau Claire Foundation was donated former commercial radio station WDRK (99.9 FM), which had been owned by Mid-West Family Broadcasting; it relaunched as student-run Blugold Radio. The station, later known as Converge Radio, was sold to the Appleton-based The Family Radio Network in 2020 after it failed to become financially viable as an independent entity.

In Wisconsin Public Radio's 2024 network realignment, WUEC was placed in the WPR Music network. It is one of three Music transmitters in WPR's Western Region, along with WVSS and WEPP-FM in Rice Lake.
