= XHUTU-FM =

Radio station in Emiliano Zapata, Tabasco

Emiliano Zapata, Tabasco, Mexico; Mexico
- Frequency: 90.5 MHz
- Branding: Radio XHUTU 90.5

Programming
- Format: Mexican college

Ownership
- Owner: Universidad Tecnológica del Usumacinta

History
- First air date: November 20, 2012
- Call sign meaning: Universidad Tecnológica del Usumacinta

Technical information
- ERP: 1.9 kW

Links
- Website: web.archive.org/web/20150627175442/http://www.utusumacinta.edu.mx/radio_utu.html

XHUTU-FM is a Mexican college radio station owned by the Universidad Tecnológica del Usumacinta in Emiliano Zapata, Tabasco. The station broadcasts on 90.5 MHz.

== History ==
XHUTU received its permit in 2011 and held its formal inauguration on September 4, 2012.
