= KNLM =

- Yucca Valley, California; United States
- Frequency: 90.5 MHz

Programming
- Format: Christian radio

Ownership
- Owner: Advance Ministries Inc. d/b/a New Life Christian School

History
- First air date: February 13, 2014

Technical information
- Licensing authority: FCC
- Facility ID: 173947
- Class: A
- ERP: 3,500 watts
- HAAT: 75 meters (246 ft)
- Transmitter coordinates: 34°09′15″N 116°11′50″W

Links
- Public license information: Public file; LMS
- Webcast: Listen live
- Website: knlb.com

KNLM is an FM radio station broadcasting a Christian radio format from Yucca Valley, California.

== History ==
KNLM began broadcasting on February 13, 2014.
