= KPHL =

- Pahala, Hawaii; United States
- Frequency: 90.5 MHz

Programming
- Format: Religious broadcasting

Ownership
- Owner: Vineyard Christian Fellowship of Honolulu, Inc.

History
- Call sign meaning: Pahala

Technical information
- Licensing authority: FCC
- Facility ID: 91242
- Class: A
- ERP: 250 watts
- HAAT: -12 meters (-38 feet)
- Transmitter coordinates: 19°06′02″N 155°34′09″W

Links
- Public license information: Public file; LMS

KPHL (90.5 FM) is a non-commercial educational radio station licensed to serve Pahala, Hawaii. The station is owned by Vineyard Christian Fellowship of Honolulu, Inc. It airs a religious broadcasting format.

The station was assigned the KPHL call letters by the Federal Communications Commission on February 13, 2003.

== Ownership ==
In November 2006, an agreement was reached for Vineyard Christian Fellowship of Honolulu Inc., headed by president Fali Tualaulelei, to acquire KPHL from Memphis, Tennessee-based Broadcasting For The Challenged Inc., headed by President George Flinn Jr., for a reported cash sale price of $1,500. T.J. Malievsky, a director of the Vineyard Christian Fellowship, is a former general manager of the Honolulu station group owned by Salem Communications.
