= WVHY =

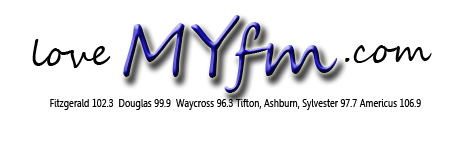
- Axson, Georgia; United States
- Broadcast area: Waycross, Georgia
- Frequency: 97.1 MHz
- Branding: MyFM

Programming
- Format: Classic hits
- Affiliations: Georgia Southern Radio Network

Ownership
- Owner: Becky Vickers, Personal Representative

History
- First air date: July 11, 2016; 9 years ago

Technical information
- Licensing authority: FCC
- Facility ID: 191568
- Class: A
- Transmitter coordinates: 31°16′13.0″N 83°39′18.0″W

Links
- Public license information: Public file; LMS

WVHY (97.1 FM) is a commercial radio station licensed in the US to Axson, Georgia. WVHY is part of a group of South Georgia Radio Stations playing Classic Hits, and is owned by Becky Vickers, Personal Representative for the estate of Victor Vickers.

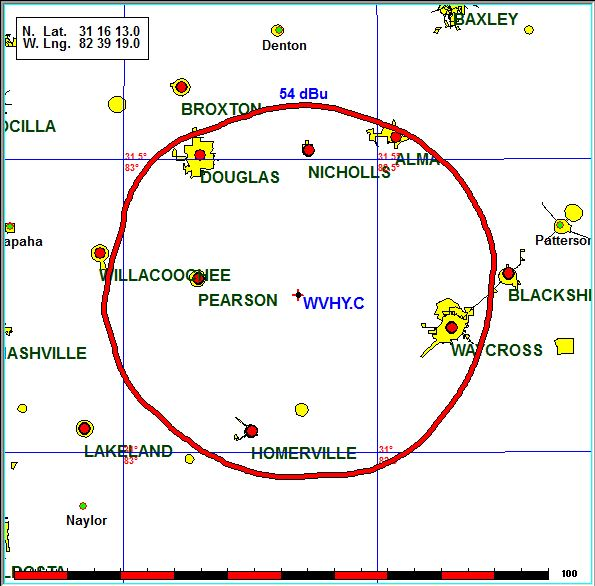
54 signal map of WVHY 97.1 Axson GA
