= WHEM (FM) =

- Eau Claire, Wisconsin; United States
- Frequency: 91.3 MHz

Programming
- Format: Christian radio

Ownership
- Owner: Fourth Dimension, Inc.

History
- First air date: August 22, 1995

Technical information
- Licensing authority: FCC
- Facility ID: 63152
- Class: A
- ERP: 2,000 watts
- HAAT: 95 meters (312 ft)
- Transmitter coordinates: 44°45′49.9″N 91°31′6.6″W

Links
- Public license information: Public file; LMS
- Website: whem.com

WHEM is a Christian radio station in Eau Claire, Wisconsin, broadcasting on 91.3 FM. The station is owned by Fourth Dimension, Inc.

== History ==
The construction permit for 91.3 MHz in Eau Claire was originally obtained by the state Educational Communications Board for Wisconsin Public Radio. The network at the time was converting to a dual-program service, but it lacked a second transmitter beyond WHWC to serve Eau Claire. The network then abandoned those plans, even though it held the construction permit, and opted to simulcast most of its classical music and arts programming on WUEC, the student station of the University of Wisconsin-Eau Claire; however, this programming did not air during afternoons and evenings, when UW-Eau Claire student broadcasting was on the air. WUEC had a stronger signal than the proposed WHEM, which would have used a surplus transmitter previously used by KUWS in Superior, Wisconsin; the Educational Communications Board opted to sell the permit. The buyer was Fourth Dimension, Inc., a local group that proposed a Christian station.

Fourth Dimension identified an unused tower belonging to Wisconsin Bell in the town of Washington and had completed most work by September 1994. While it was anticipated at the time that WHEM would debut in October, it began broadcasting on August 22, 1995, with contemporary Christian music and news updates. Two members of Fourth Dimension, Harlan and Phyllis Reinders, ran the station without taking a salary but survived thanks to the generosity of listeners, including unsolicited checks and food deliveries.

== Translators ==
Broadcast translator for WHEM-FM
| Call sign | Frequency | City of license | FID | ERP (W) | Class | FCC info |
|---|---|---|---|---|---|---|
| W224BL | 92.7 FM | Ladysmith, Wisconsin | 154843 | 10 | D | LMS |
