= WERG =

Coordinates: 42.043°N 80.066°W

Erie, Pennsylvania; United States
- Frequency: 90.5 MHz
- Branding: 90.5 WERG

Programming
- Format: Alternative

Ownership
- Owner: Gannon University

History
- First air date: 1972
- Call sign meaning: Education Radio Gannon

Technical information
- Licensing authority: FCC
- Facility ID: 23087
- Class: A
- ERP: 2,750 Watts
- HAAT: 114 meters (374 ft)

Links
- Public license information: Public file; LMS
- Website: http://www.wergfm.com

90.5 WERG is an alternative formatted college radio station in Erie, Pennsylvania. The station is owned by Gannon University. Its transmitter is located in Summit Township, Erie County, Pennsylvania.

== History ==
On December 1, 1972, at 6pm, WERG signed on at 89.1 FM with an effective radiated power of 10 watts. Gannon University students operate WERG during the week; the station maintains broadcast operations over the weekends with the help of community volunteers who run alternative programming for the Erie community. One of these shows, Super Soul Saturday, has become an institution in Erie radio and an integral part of WERG's weekend programming schedule.

Major technical upgrades came in 1980 when WTAE-FM radio in Pittsburgh, Pennsylvania, donated a 1949 Westinghouse FM-3 transmitter to Gannon. This enabled WERG to go to 3,000 watts, giving the radio station a strong signal throughout the City of Erie. The new Shively antenna was mounted on a tower atop Nash Library, and WERG moved up the dial to 89.9-FM.

Throughout the eighties, WERG operated with an Album Rock format under the moniker "Rock 89". With a regular weekday format, plus Super Soul Saturday, various community programs on Sunday, and a weeknight news magazine show -Total News at 6—WERG became known as an educational station that not only trained you in the mechanics of broadcasting, but let you do so while enjoying the benefits of having an actual sizable listening audience. As the eighties drew to a close, WERG evolved from an album rock station and began playing new wave and alternative rock. In 1989, WERG obtained the necessary equipment to begin broadcasting in stereo.

While WERG's new Modern Rock format took shape, station management was looking for a new identity to go with the station's new sound. Student manager Scott Powell was in Pittsburgh one weekend and listening to the "war" between the two Contemporary Hit stations in the city: B-94 and Energy 105. Something clicked. "Energy" was not only a good-sounding name, it fit the call letters of the station as well: WERG. ENERGY. On the morning of August 29, 1989, WERG began identifying itself as "Energy-FM 90". Program Director Andy McNutt developed the station's signature sound as a home for the best new rock on Erie's radio dial, with a playlist featuring artists like U2, R.E.M., Depeche Mode, Concrete Blonde, Siouxsie and the Banshees, The Jesus and Mary Chain, Michelle Shocked, Pere Ubu, Big Audio Dynamite, Sting, Social Distortion, the Hoodoo Gurus, and Sarah McLachlan. Songs by groups like EMF and the Divinyls, which Energy-FM premiered, went on to become #1 hits on the pop charts that summer.

WERG entered the digital realm as compact disc players were installed over the summer of 1990. Then, Nirvana arrived and revolutionized the music industry: moving the format that is now called "Modern Rock" into the musical mainstream. "Energy-FM 90" was how the station was identified from 1989 to 2005, a run of sixteen years.

In 1999, the welcome news came that WERG would be getting all-new studios and much-needed office space. WERG was finally able to move from the hidden recesses of the Zurn Science Center basement, into the Walker Building at 7th and Peach Streets. Construction on the new facilities began in the spring of 2000. Legendary station engineer and Gannon professor Dr. John Duda was instrumental in the design of the new facilities, but was never able to see them finished; Duda died in 2000, leaving behind a legacy that is now commemorated each spring with the annual Duda Awards, presented to students on the WERG staff who have demonstrated excellence in various broadcasting techniques over the previous academic year.

WERG began broadcasting from the Walker Building studios in September 2000, and the station was now utilizing digital broadcasting technology: the DigiLink IV from Arrakis Systems. The DigiLink IV made it possible for WERG to begin continuous operation without having to sign off after midnight. In 2002, Gannon University hired local broadcaster and Gannon alumnus Chet LaPrice to oversee WERG operations. Chet was the longtime music director and midday host on Country 98 WXTA.

Since the station's inception, WERG's signal had emanated from an antenna in downtown Erie. The antenna, being below average terrain for Erie County, resulted in an inferior signal that faded rapidly as one moved away from the city. The Gannon administration began looking into the possibility of relocating the station's antenna to high ground south of the city.

On June 30, 2005, at 9:50 a.m., WERG moved from 89.9 FM to 90.5 FM and began transmitting from its new antenna in Summit Township. On-air, the station is now identified by dial position and call letters: 90.5 WERG. The new-and-improved signal brought clear reception throughout Northwestern Pennsylvania, eastern Ohio, western New York, and southern Ontario.

In 2014, 90.5 WERG was the recipient of the Abraham & Borst Award for "Best College Station in the Nation." Later that year, 90.5 WERG moved from its fourteen-year home in the Walker Building to the brand-new Center for Communication and the Arts, located at 700 Peach Street on the Gannon Campus. Offices and studio facilities are located in Room 201 on the second floor of the SCA building. The building was officially dedicated and blessed at 10:00 am on September 5, 2014.

90.5 WERG is an NBC News Radio affiliate, and also carries regional newscasts from Erie News Now.

=== Super Soul Saturday ===
Super Soul Saturday has been a part of WERG Radio for over forty years. What started out as a student involvement project has evolved to a valuable community resource providing alternative music, information, and entertainment not available elsewhere on the radio dial.

In 1979, A.J. Miceli, chairman of the Department of Theatre and Communication Arts at Gannon University, was approached by Bobby "K" Kaigler about the possibility of joining Homer "Lee" Smith's Saturday show on WERG. Soon, James "Jim Christopher" Eaton was added to form what became the nucleus of Super Soul Saturday. Other dedicated volunteers joined, and Super Soul gradually became a fixture on WERG's weekend schedule.

The "Hall of Fame" of Super Soul Saturday personalities include many familiar names to long-time listeners. Winston "Sony" Ellis (1975) worked at WUFO and WKBW in Buffalo, NY. Dion Clarke (1975), at television stations in both New York City and Atlanta. Steve Collins (1975) was heard on radio stations WRIE and K-104 here in Erie, PA before leaving to work at KDIA and KBLX in San Francisco and Berkeley, California. Ken Darby (1976) worked with several television stations in Florida; Harry Hairston (1977) was on WQLN radio and both WSEE and WICU television before joining the Fox Television Network in Detroit, Michigan. James "Jim Christopher" Eaton was on many local radio stations, including WQLN, WEYZ, WLVU, and Classy 100. Many members of the Super Soul staff were affiliated with Q-1400 (WBLQ) in the mid-eighties, including Homer "Lee" Smith, Bobby K, Timmie Mack, Danny "Mr. J" Jones, The Captain, John "Chilly J" Norton, and Dorothy Smith.

Mike Carbone (Mike West) joined Super Soul Saturday after working with and producing Mix Shows and re-mixing music for WBLK-FM in Buffalo, NY and CING-FM in Toronto. Mike West was awarded Top Mix DJ in the US in 1990 by the Westwood One Radio Network after winning their nationwide Club Mix Competition.

From those early years, the present Super Soul Saturday program has expanded into a block format consisting of music (R&B, Gospel, Classic Soul, Blues, Jazz, Rap, Club, House, and Hip Hop), public service, and community-oriented information.

Super Soul Saturday airs for thirty-three hours on 90.5 WERG every weekend, from midnight Saturday until 9am Sunday morning.

== See also ==
- List of college radio stations in the United States
