= Troy University Public Radio =

Public radio network in Alabama and Georgia, United States

Troy Public Radio
- Troy, Alabama; United States
- Frequency: See § Stations
- Branding: Troy Public Radio

Programming
- Format: Public radio and classical
- Affiliations: APM, NPR, PRX

Ownership
- Owner: Troy University

History
- First air date: March 1, 1977

Links
- Webcast: Listen live
- Website: troy.edu/student-life-resources/campus-media/troy-public-radio

Troy Public Radio (TPR) is a network of public radio stations based in Troy, Alabama, United States, that serve southeastern Alabama and parts of western Georgia and northwestern Florida with classical music, folk music, and jazz programs, as well as news and feature programs from the National Public Radio, Public Radio Exchange, and American Public Media networks. The stations are licensed to Troy University, which houses its studios inside room number 150B on the first floor of Wallace Hall on International Boulevard in east Troy.

== History ==
WTSU-FM started broadcasting on March 1, 1977, as the state's third public radio station (the callsign stands for the university's name then, "Troy State University,"), and the first south of Birmingham. WTSU originally broadcast at 90.1 MHz with a power of 50,000 watts; by 1981, it moved to its present frequency of 89.9, doubling its wattage to 100,000. Programming from the start was a blend of NPR news and classical music, combined with an automated block of "beautiful music" between 9:00 a.m. and 4:00 p.m. TUPR discontinued the easy-listening daytime format in 1993 in favor of then-more conventional classical programming.

The station would expand its service area to all of southeastern Alabama in the 1980s, adding the frequencies in Columbus in 1984 and Dothan in 1986. On January 1, 2000, TUPR began broadcasting 24 hours per day.

Public Radio is one component of Troy University's Broadcast and Digital Network; the other is "TrojanVision", a student-operated television channel seen on several cable systems throughout southeastern Alabama. The Broadcast and Digital Network enlist students from the Hall School of Journalism as staffers.

TUPR set a tentative date of May 2010 to begin streaming all three HD channels. HD-2 consists of the all-music Classical 24 network, while HD-3 airs news programs from the BBC World Service.

In 2011, TUPR began streaming all three of its channels live on the Internet. It had been one of the few NPR members not to offer live streaming.

== Stations ==
Three stations comprise the network:

Call sign	Frequency	City of license	FID	ERP (W)	HAAT	Class	FCC info
WTSU (Note: Flagship station)	89.9 FM	Troy, Alabama	68187	100,000	230 m (755 ft)	C1	LMS
WRWA	88.7 FM	Dothan, Alabama	68185	50,000	143 m (469 ft)	C2	LMS
WTJB	91.7 FM	Columbus, Georgia	68186	5,000 (horiz.); 3,330 (vert.)	91 m (299 ft)	A	LMS
