= KCGR =

- Oran, Missouri; United States
- Frequency: 90.5 MHz
- Branding: Bott Radio Network

Programming
- Format: Christian
- Affiliations: Bott Radio Network

Ownership
- Owner: Bott Radio Network; (Community Broadcasting, Inc.)

History
- First air date: 2008

Technical information
- Licensing authority: FCC
- Facility ID: 173701
- Class: A
- ERP: 2,100 watts
- HAAT: 73.6 meters (241 ft)
- Transmitter coordinates: 36°59′52″N 89°38′52″W

Links
- Public license information: Public file; LMS
- Webcast: Listen live
- Website: Official website

KCGR (90.5 FM) is a non-commercial educational radio station licensed to serve Oran, Missouri, United States. The station, established in 2008, is owned by Bott Radio Network, through licensee Community Broadcasting, Inc. KCGR broadcasts a Christian radio format as an affiliate of the Bott Radio Network.

== History ==
This station received its original construction permit from the Federal Communications Commission on February 19, 2008. The new station was assigned the KCGR call sign by the FCC on March 14, 2008. KCGR received its license to cover from the FCC on November 4, 2008.

== Translators ==
KCGR programming is also carried on several broadcast translator stations to extend or improve the coverage area of the primary station.

Call sign	Frequency	City of license	FID	ERP (W)	Class	FCC info
K259BB	99.7 FM	Sikeston, Missouri	138445	250	D	LMS
K277BJ	103.3 FM	Cape Girardeau, Missouri	138437	250	D	LMS
