= WVSS =

Radio station in Menomonie, Wisconsin

Coordinates: 44.9155°N 92.0763°W

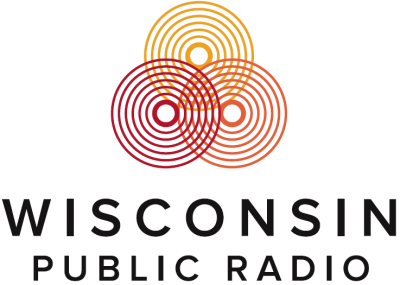
- Menomonie, Wisconsin; United States
- Frequency: 90.7 MHz
- Branding: WPR News and Classical

Programming
- Format: Public radio, Classical music, News
- Network: Wisconsin Public Radio (NPR News & Music)

Ownership
- Owner: Board of Regents of the University of Wisconsin System

History
- First air date: 1970
- Former frequencies: 89.5 MHz (1970–1976)
- Call sign meaning: "Voice of Stout State" (former name for University of Wisconsin–Stout)

Technical information
- Licensing authority: FCC
- Facility ID: 4287
- Class: A
- ERP: 590 watts
- HAAT: 130 meters (430 ft)

Links
- Public license information: Public file; LMS
- Webcast: Listen Live
- Website: wpr.org

WVSS (90.7 FM) is a radio station licensed to Menomonie, Wisconsin. The station is part of Wisconsin Public Radio (WPR) and airs WPR's "NPR News & Music Network", consisting of classical music and news and talk programming, as well as local news from WPR's regional studio in Eau Claire.

Prior to being a Wisconsin Public Radio transmitter, WVSS was a station programmed by students at the University of Wisconsin–Stout in Menomonie. Student programming moved off the FM frequency in 1988, and it broadcast classical music programming for two years until joining WPR in 1990.

== History ==
On April 1, 1968, Stout State University was awarded a construction permit to build a new radio station on 89.5 MHz, to broadcast with 10 watts; a committee had been researching the idea of a station as early as 1966. WVSS began broadcasting in 1970, initially operating for seven hours a day; this soon expanded, and the station broadcast from 7 a.m. to 2 a.m. by 1980. The studios were located in what had been the boys' locker room in the basement of the former Central Elementary School, which the university had previously purchased to convert into a communications center. Broadcasts were upgraded to stereo in 1975; the first broadcasts over the summer took place in 1980, to come into compliance with new Federal Communications Commission (FCC) regulations.

In 1988, student programming from UW–Stout moved to a cable system as "C-Rock", in part so that the students could produce programming without meeting FCC rules and also to allow for the student operation to be supported by local advertisers. The general manager, Arthur "Ace" Matthews, implemented an automated schedule of classical music programming. This had originally been put in place to help the station meet FCC minimum operating hour requirements; Matthews spent about $6,000 of his own money on a collection of some 540 classical music CDs. The station then went silent for seven months in 1990 to replace its antenna and returned with WPR programming that November. The changes came at a time when WPR was restructuring into two program services—the NPR News & Classical (now News & Music) service used by WVSS and the Wisconsin Ideas Network—but only had one transmitter to cover western Wisconsin.

In 1994, WPR proposed to co-site the WVSS transmitter with WHWC at a site near Wheeler. The site change was mutually exclusive with an application by Wisconsin Voice of Christian Youth—owner of WVCY-FM in Milwaukee—for a radio station in Eau Claire, which was ultimately the one approved in December 1995. The News & Music service is now heard in Eau Claire on WUEC.

== Programming ==
The NPR News & Music Network, heard on WVSS, offers the national Morning Edition and All Things Considered programs from NPR, as well as Fresh Air and Marketplace, and classical music during the day and at night.
