= WTRT =

- Benton, Kentucky; United States
- Frequency: 88.1 MHz
- Branding: Thrive FM

Programming
- Format: Christian radio

Ownership
- Owner: Pennyrile Christian Community, Inc.
- Sister stations: WAAJ, WVHM

History
- First air date: 1999

Technical information
- Licensing authority: FCC
- Facility ID: 88122
- Class: A
- ERP: 3,500 watts
- HAAT: 66 meters (217 ft)
- Transmitter coordinates: 36°47′53″N 88°20′50″W

Links
- Public license information: Public file; LMS
- Website: thrivefm88.com

WTRT (88.1 FM) is a Christian–formatted radio station licensed to Benton, Kentucky, United States, and serving the Jackson Purchase area of western Kentucky, including Paducah. Owned by Pennyrile Christian Community, Inc., WTRT's studios are on College Street in downtown Hardin, Kentucky, with transmitter sited off Dowdy Cemetery Road south of Benton.

== History ==
WTRT signed on in 1999 as the third station in the Heartland Ministries organization.

== Programming ==
The station airs a format consisting of modern praise and worship as well as a few Christian talk and teaching programs.
