= KIBC =

- Burney, California; United States
- Broadcast area: Burney, California
- Frequency: 90.5 MHz

Programming
- Format: Religious

Ownership
- Owner: Burney Educational Broadcasting Foundation

Technical information
- Licensing authority: FCC
- Facility ID: 7862
- Class: C2
- ERP: 3,000 watts
- HAAT: 444.0 meters (1,456.7 ft)
- Transmitter coordinates: 40°52′29″N 121°46′13″W

Links
- Public license information: Public file; LMS
- Webcast: Listen live
- Website: kibcfm.org

KIBC (90.5 FM) is a radio station broadcasting a religious radio format. Licensed to Burney, California, United States, and serving Shasta County and the surrounding Sierra Nevada area, the station is currently owned by Burney Educational Broadcasting Foundation.
