= XHFL-FM (Sonora) =

Radio station in Ciudad Obregón, Sonora

- Ciudad Obregón, Sonora; Mexico
- Frequency: 90.5 MHz
- Branding: La Invasora

Programming
- Format: Grupera

Ownership
- Owner: Uniradio; (Radio Difusora XHFL, S.A. de C.V.)

History
- First air date: 1982
- Call sign meaning: Original concessionaire Fernando Lema Monge

Technical information
- Licensing authority: CRT
- Class: B
- ERP: 20,093 watts
- HAAT: 238.6 m (783 ft)
- Transmitter coordinates: 27°26′52″N 109°46′41.9″W

Links
- Website: La Invasora

XHFL-FM is a radio station in Ciudad Obregón, Sonora, Mexico. Broadcasting on 90.5 FM, XHFL is owned by Uniradio and carries a Grupera format known as La Invasora.

== History ==
The concession for the station was issued to Fernando Lema Monge in April 1982. It was formerly owned by Radiorama.
