= WTSU =

- Troy, Alabama; United States
- Broadcast area: Montgomery, Alabama
- Frequency: 89.9 MHz (HD Radio)
- Branding: Troy University Public Radio

Programming
- Format: Public radio and classical
- Affiliations: APM, NPR, PRX

Ownership
- Owner: Troy University Public Radio; (Troy University)
- Sister stations: WRWA, WTJB

History
- First air date: March 1, 1977
- Former frequencies: 90.1 MHz (1977–1981)
- Call sign meaning: Troy State University

Technical information
- Licensing authority: FCC
- Facility ID: 68187
- Class: C1
- ERP: 100,000 watts
- HAAT: 230 meters (750 ft)
- Transmitter coordinates: 32°3′40″N 86°01′19″W
- Repeaters: 88.7 WRWA (Dothan); 91.7 WTJB (Columbus, Georgia)

Links
- Public license information: Public file; LMS
- Webcast: Listen live
- Website: troypublicradio.org

WTSU (89.9 FM) is an American radio station licensed to serve Troy, Alabama and serving the Montgomery, Alabama market. The station, established in 1977, is owned and operated by Troy University. It broadcasts a classical music format as the flagship station of the Troy University Public Radio network.

WTSU broadcasts in HD.

== History ==
WTSU started broadcasting on March 1, 1977, as the state's third public radio station, and the first south of Birmingham. The station was assigned the call sign "WTSU" by the Federal Communications Commission (FCC). WTSU originally broadcast at 90.1 MHz with a power of 50,000 watts; by 1981, it moved to its present frequency of 89.9, doubling its wattage to 100,000. Programming from the start was a blend of news and classical music, combined with an automated block of "beautiful music" between 9:00 a.m. and 4:00 p.m. Troy University Public Radio discontinued the easy-listening daytime format in 1993.
