= WZEV =

- Lineville, Alabama; United States
- Frequency: 90.5 MHz
- Branding: Gold 90.5 FM

Programming
- Format: Oldies

Ownership
- Owner: B. Jordan Communications Corporation

History
- First air date: 2013

Technical information
- Licensing authority: FCC
- Facility ID: 173733
- Class: A
- ERP: 100 watts
- HAAT: 79.8 metres (262 ft)
- Transmitter coordinates: 33°17′54.6″N 85°41′24.2″W

Links
- Public license information: Public file; LMS

WZEV (90.5 FM) is a radio station licensed to serve the community of Lineville, Alabama. The station is owned by B. Jordan Communications Corporation. It airs an oldies music format. The station carries the Columbus River Dragons hockey games and coaches show along with the Choccolocco Monsters baseball team.

The station was assigned the WZEV call letters by the Federal Communications Commission on September 3, 2012.
