= KSHU =

- Huntsville, Texas; United States
- Frequency: 90.5 MHz (HD Radio)

Programming
- Format: Variety
- Subchannels: HD2: El Gato

Ownership
- Owner: Sam Houston State University

History
- First air date: August 1, 1974 (52 years ago) (facility; at 89.3 MHz); November 28, 1988 (37 years ago) (at 90.5 MHz)
- Former frequencies: 89.3 MHz (1974–1988)
- Call sign meaning: Sam Houston State University

Technical information
- Facility ID: 58743
- Class: A
- ERP: 3,000 watts
- HAAT: 77 m (253 ft)
- Transmitter coordinates: 30°42′50.00″N 95°32′58.00″W

KSHU and KSHU-TV are student-run non-commercial college radio and student television station operations located at Sam Houston State University in Huntsville, Texas. Broadcast and transmitter facilities are located within the Dan Rather Communication Building. Neither entity is affiliated with any network, and both KSHU-FM (90.5 MHz, 3000 watts) and KSHU-TV (cable channel 7) are managed and operated by the students enrolled in the School of Mass Communication.

== KSHU-FM ==
KSHU-FM first signed on the air on August 1, 1974 at 89.3 FM, operating with 10 watts. Broadcast studio space was originally located in the basement of the university’s Peabody Memorial Library.

In 1988, the radio station boosted its power, moved to the current operating frequency, and relocated to the recently built Communication Building.

Featuring an eclectic selection of music - including jazz, classical, college rock, classic rock, and hip-hop formats - KSHU-FM also broadcasts various Sam Houston State athletic events, including all home football, basketball, and baseball games (and select away games). Campus and community-based news and public affairs programs have also been featured in previous semesters. Since 2005, KSHU has held a twelve-hour live broadcast in support of the Walker County Relay for Life. For years, all music DJ shifts, news and sports broadcasts, and all local public affairs programs were written and produced by students in the Mass Communication department; in recent years computer automation has enabled the station to operate 24-hours a day, between semesters, and other times when students are not available.

KSHU-FM’s coverage area includes most of Walker County and several of the surrounding counties.

KSHU-FM currently identifies itself as “90.5, the Kat," named in honor of the university mascot, the Bearkat. Former indents include “91 Rock,” “U-90.5,” and “90.5 KSHU.” KSHU-FM is simulcast overnight on cable channel 7 (KSHU-TV).

== KSHU-TV ==
KSHU-TV is a cable-only channel viewable on SuddenLink Cable channel 7.

Daytime programming currently consists of Annenberg/CPB Educational television, while evening programming is entirely student produced. KSHU-TV has long broadcast a live, thirty-minute evening newscast weekday evenings at six o’clock; students write and host news, sports, and weather segments. KSHU-TV during the weekends air re-runs of popular shows among students like Seinfeld, Family Guy, and Gossip Girl, with a syndication license. KSHU News 7 is also the only university in Texas to broadcast a Spanish-only edition of their newscast. A community bulletin board (CBB) updates news of campus and community non-profit events during overnight hours and weekends.
