= XHUDEM-FM =

Radio station of the Universidad de Monterrey

- San Pedro Garza García, Nuevo León; Mexico
- Broadcast area: Monterrey metropolitan area
- Frequency: 90.5 MHz
- Branding: Radio UDEM

Programming
- Format: University radio

Ownership
- Owner: Universidad de Monterrey

History
- First air date: 1994
- Former call signs: XHUMY-FM (February 11, 1994—May 9, 1996); XHUDM-FM (May 9, 1996—August 23, 2000)
- Call sign meaning: "UDEM", short for Universidad de Monterrey

Technical information
- Licensing authority: CRT
- Class: A
- ERP: 3 kW
- HAAT: −293 meters (−961 ft)
- Transmitter coordinates: 25°38′49.4″N 100°18′48.4″W

Links
- Website: www.udem.edu.mx/es/vive/radio-udem

XHUDEM-FM is a radio station serving Monterrey, Nuevo León. Mexico. It is owned by the Universidad de Monterrey and broadcasts on 90.5 FM from its campus in San Pedro Garza García and their transmitter is atop Cerro Loma Larga.

== History ==
XHUMY-FM was permitted on February 11, 1994, and had an effective radiated power of 10 watts. The university changed the callsign to XHUDM-FM in 1996 and to the current XHUDEM-FM in 2000.
