= WTCQ =

- Vidalia, Georgia; United States
- Frequency: 97.7 MHz
- Branding: Your Favorite 98Q

Programming
- Format: Classic hits
- Affiliations: Westwood One, Jones Radio Network

Ownership
- Owner: Dennis Jones; (RadioJones, LLC)
- Sister stations: WVOP; WYUM

History
- First air date: March 5, 1969; 57 years ago

Technical information
- Licensing authority: FCC
- Facility ID: 70117
- Class: A
- ERP: 4,300 watts
- HAAT: 118 meters
- Transmitter coordinates: 32°13′12.00″N 82°26′7.00″W

Links
- Public license information: Public file; LMS
- Webcast: Listen live
- Website: southeastgeorgiatoday.com

WTCQ (97.7 FM, "98Q") is a radio station broadcasting a classic hits format. It is licensed to Vidalia, Georgia, United States. The station is currently owned by Dennis Jones, through licensee RadioJones, LLC, and features programming from Westwood One and Jones Radio Network.

Former logo

== History ==
The station signed on the air on March 5, 1969. The station was first owned locally by the Vidalia Broadcasting Company. Throughout the 1980s and early 1990s, it was under an adult contemporary format.
