= WZBN (FM) =

Radio station in Camilla-Albany, Georgia

- Camilla, Georgia; United States
- Broadcast area: Albany, Georgia and vicinity
- Frequency: 105.5 MHz
- Branding: Praise 105.5 & 106.9

Programming
- Format: Traditional & Urban contemporary gospel

Ownership
- Owner: Greater 2nd Mt. Olive Missionary Baptist Church

History
- First air date: April 1979
- Former call signs: WQVE

Technical information
- Licensing authority: FCC
- Facility ID: 43240
- Class: A
- ERP: 6,000 watts
- HAAT: 84 meters (276 ft)
- Transmitter coordinates: 31°18′51.60″N 84°12′17.60″W
- Repeater: 106.9 WGSW (Americus)

Links
- Public license information: Public file; LMS
- Webcast: Listen Live
- Website: praise1055.com

WZBN (105.5 FM) is a Christian radio station, owned by Greater 2nd Mt. Olive Baptist Church, serving metro Albany, Georgia with a traditional gospel and urban contemporary gospel music format, under the brand: Praise 105.5 FM...Albany's Gospel Leader. Its studios are located at Albany Towers in Albany and the transmitter is located north of Camilla, Georgia.

On November 28, 2022, WZBN began simulcasting on WGSW 106.9 FM Americus and rebranded as "Praise 105.5 & 106.9".
