= WTLD =

- Jesup, Georgia; United States
- Frequency: 90.5 MHz

Programming
- Format: Gospel

Ownership
- Owner: Resurrection House Ministries, Inc.

History
- Former call signs: WBKF (1999–1999)

Technical information
- Licensing authority: FCC
- Facility ID: 89988
- Class: A
- ERP: 6,000 watts
- HAAT: 52.0 meters
- Transmitter coordinates: 31°35′49.00″N 81°56′14.00″W

Links
- Public license information: Public file; LMS

WTLD (90.5 FM) is a Christian radio station broadcasting a Gospel format. Licensed to Jesup, Georgia, United States. The station is currently owned by Resurrection House Ministries, Inc.

== History ==
The station went on the air as WBKF on 1999-04-30. On 1999-07-09, the station changed its call sign to the current WTLD.
