= WVFA =

- Lebanon, New Hampshire; United States
- Broadcast area: Lebanon-Hanover-White River Junction area
- Frequency: 90.5 MHz

Programming
- Format: Contemporary Inspirational

Ownership
- Owner: Green Mountain Educational Fellowship, Inc

Technical information
- Licensing authority: FCC
- Facility ID: 92641
- Class: A
- ERP: 15 watts
- HAAT: 187 meters (614 ft)
- Transmitter coordinates: 43°37′17″N 72°10′30″W

Links
- Public license information: Public file; LMS
- Website: wvfaradio.com

WVFA (90.5 FM) is an American radio station broadcasting a Contemporary Inspirational format. Licensed to Lebanon, New Hampshire, United States, the station serves the Lebanon-Rutland-White River Junction area. The station is owned by Green Mountain Educational Fellowship, Inc.

In July 2010, WVFA was granted a U.S. Federal Communications Commission construction permit to increase effective radiated power (ERP) to 300 watts from the current 12 watts. But WVFA has not acted on the permit yet. WVFA airs traditional and contemporary hymns along with some Christian radio instructional and preaching shows.
