= WUMC =

- Elizabethton, Tennessee; United States
- Broadcast area: Tri-Cities TN / VA
- Frequency: 90.5 MHz
- Branding: Milligan Radio

Programming
- Format: College

Ownership
- Owner: Milligan University

History
- First air date: September 9, 1996

Technical information
- Licensing authority: FCC
- Facility ID: 82695
- Class: A
- ERP: 500 watts
- HAAT: −87 meters (−285 ft)
- Transmitter coordinates: 36°17′58″N 82°17′28″W

Links
- Public license information: Public file; LMS
- Webcast: milliganradio.com
- Website: milliganradio.com

WUMC (90.5 FM, "Milligan Radio") is a student-operated college radio station licensed to Elizabethton, Tennessee, United States, serving the Tri-Cities region of Tennessee and Virginia. The station is owned by Milligan University and broadcasts at 500 watts on the FM band, describing itself as the university's "award-winning student radio station."

WUMC traces its origins to 1996, when it began broadcasting on September 9 of that year under the brand name "WMCR Milligan College Radio." The Federal Communications Commission (FCC) granted the station a construction permit for a 500-watt transmitter and the call letters WUMC in 1997, with a full license approved in 2000. The station broadcasts student-hosted programming including music, talk, and sports, and has streamed online at milliganradio.com since 2009. It is housed in the Paxson Communications Building, named after broadcasting entrepreneur Lowell Paxson, founder of the Home Shopping Network and Ion Television, who facilitated the station's early development at Milligan.
