= WVRD =

- Zebulon, North Carolina; United States
- Frequency: 90.5 MHz
- Branding: The Journey

Programming
- Format: Contemporary Christian

Ownership
- Owner: Liberty University; (Liberty University, Inc.)

History
- First air date: 1990 (as WAHD, originally licensed to Wilson, NC)
- Former call signs: WAHD (1988–2000); WXJC (2000–2002); WAJC (2002–2010)

Technical information
- Licensing authority: FCC
- Facility ID: 41094
- Class: A
- ERP: 1,200 watts
- HAAT: 64 meters
- Transmitter coordinates: 35°49′19″N 78°18′36″W

Links
- Public license information: Public file; LMS
- Webcast: Listen live
- Website: WVRD Online

WVRD (90.5 FM) is a radio station broadcasting a religious format. Licensed to Zebulon, North Carolina, United States, the station is currently owned by Liberty University.

== History ==
Mega-Educational Communications started WAHD in 1990 with a mostly automated soft adult contemporary format. The station was licensed to Wilson, North Carolina, though it barely put a listenable signal there. Later, WAHD played easy listening as "Easy 90.5". In 1991, the station added W260AB, a translator in Raleigh at 99.9 FM. Other formats included CHR/dance and smooth jazz; the station signed off in 1999. Calvary Satellite Network, a Christian talk/ministry service based in Costa Mesa, California brought the station back in 2001 as WXJC. On September 19, 2002, WXJC became WAJC.
