= WCRF-FM =

Moody Radio station in Cleveland

- Cleveland, Ohio; United States
- Broadcast area: Greater Cleveland
- Frequency: 103.3 MHz
- Branding: Moody Radio Cleveland

Programming
- Format: Religious
- Affiliations: Moody Radio

Ownership
- Owner: Moody Bible Institute; (The Moody Bible Institute of Chicago)

History
- First air date: November 23, 1958
- Former call signs: WCRF-FM (1958–1960); WCRF (1960–1981)
- Call sign meaning: "Christian Radio Fellowship"

Technical information
- Licensing authority: FCC
- Facility ID: 66101
- Class: B
- ERP: 25,500 watts
- HAAT: 201 meters (659 ft)
- Transmitter coordinates: 41°17′48″N 81°39′27″W
- Repeaters: 91.9 WVME (Meadville); 90.5 WVML (Millersburg); 90.1 WVMN (New Castle); 89.5 WVMS (Sandusky); 91.7 WVMU (Ashtabula)

Links
- Public license information: Public file; LMS
- Webcast: Listen live
- Website: moodyradio.org/cleveland

WCRF-FM (103.3 FM) is a non-commercial radio station licensed to Cleveland, Ohio, known as "Moody Radio Cleveland". Owned by the Moody Bible Institute, the station broadcasts a religious format and is the Cleveland affiliate for Moody Radio. Both the WCRF-FM studios and transmitter are located in the Cleveland suburb of Brecksville.

In addition to a standard analog transmission, WCRF-FM is available online, and extends its coverage outside of the Greater Cleveland area by using five full-power satellites.

== History ==
WCRF-FM signed on the air on November 23, 1958. Since its founding, it has been owned by the Moody Bible Institute. WCRF was the first Moody radio station outside the ministry's home base of Chicago. In 1981, the "-FM" suffix was re-added to the call sign after having been removed in 1960. WCRF-FM celebrated its 50th anniversary in 2008.

In 1998, WCRF won the National Association of Broadcasters Marconi Award for "Religious/Gospel Station of the Year."

== Programming ==
The station features a locally produced morning show hosted by Brian Dahlen and Jannelle Nevels. Daily Christian talk and teaching programs account for all other programming.

WCRF is a member of both the National Religious Broadcasters (NRB) and the Evangelical Council for Financial Accountability (ECFA).

=== Satellites and translators ===
WCRF also extends its signal via the following full-power satellites:

Call sign	Frequency	City of license	FID	ERP (W)	HAAT	Class	Transmitter coordinates	FCC info
WVME	91.9 FM	Meadville, Pennsylvania	88021	4,400	94 m (308 ft)	A	41°37′50.2″N 80°10′37.2″W	LMS
WVML	90.5 FM	Millersburg, Ohio	85908	1,500	112 m (367 ft)	B1	40°36′8.2″N 81°44′31.5″W	LMS
WVMN	90.1 FM	New Castle, Pennsylvania	43698	2,000	72 m (236 ft)	A	41°0′47.2″N 80°17′35.2″W	LMS
WVMS	89.5 FM	Sandusky, Ohio	43701	5,500	30 m (98 ft)	A	41°26′29.1″N 82°48′19.6″W	LMS
WVMU	91.7 FM	Ashtabula, Ohio	172330	3,200	104.3 m (342 ft)	A	41°51′14″N 80°41′20″W	LMS
