= WUPX (FM) =

Radio station at Northern Michigan University

Coordinates: 46.5144°N 87.4854°W

- Marquette, Michigan; United States
- Frequency: 91.5 MHz (HD Radio)
- Branding: Radio X

Programming
- Format: Variety

Ownership
- Owner: Northern Michigan University

History
- First air date: September 1993
- Former call signs: WUFJ (1992, CP)
- Call sign meaning: Upper Peninsula Radio X

Technical information
- Licensing authority: FCC
- Class: A
- ERP: 1,700 watts
- HAAT: 133 meters (436 ft)

Links
- Public license information: Public file; LMS
- Website: nmu.edu/wupx/home

WUPX is a student-run radio station licensed to Northern Michigan University in Marquette, Michigan. The station broadcasts at 91.5 FM. WUPX is operated by the student organization Radio X, which also hosts concerts, events, and benefits.

WPUX is licensed to the NMU Board of Trustees, financed by the student activity fee, and operates separately from the University's other media outlet, WNMU-FM, and WNMU (TV). WUPX broadcasts from the Northern Center on the campus of Northern Michigan University.

== History ==
Beginning in 1970 as WBKX, Radio X was initially broadcasting on the AM dial from the Lee Hall Gallery. In the 1980s, Radio X switched to a cable-only format (see cable radio). WBKX achieved FM status in September 1993; however, during the FM licensing process, the Federal Communications Commission required Radio X to change its call letters to WUPX, as the station is known today. Between 1990 and 1992, Christian Johanneson was the Business Manager for the station. In 1991, Theodore Fisher was the GM and initiated the transition from cable-only to on-air.

== Station programming ==
The WUPX programming currently consists of several hour long slots every day. Each show is deejayed by a NMU student volunteer. All volunteers are selected by the General Manager and the Station Manager when additional volunteers are required.

WUPX broadcasts a wide variety of music including electronic, country, folk, heavy metal, hip hop, industrial, jazz, reggae, rock, classical, pop, Christian, world, R&B, independent, noise, and local musicians. The student deejays have individual control over their programming as long is it adheres to FCC regulations, which adds to the variety of programming.

Let's Chat with NMU Administration: This program is spread out through the school year and features several members of the NMU Administration answering questions generated by NMU students, WUPX E-Staff, and ASNMU Student Government. This program has featured NMU President Dr. Les Wong, NMU Provost Dr. Susan Koch, the Dean of Students Chris Greer, and the Director of Housing and Residence Life Carl Holm. This program is a collaboration between WUPX and ASNMU (NMU Student Government).

Thrash and Trash Tuesday: Thrash and Trash Tuesday is the longest consistent program on WUPX, airing every Tuesday for over 20 years. Thrash and Trash Tuesday begins Tuesday afternoon and continues until well into Wednesday morning. It features a selection of new and classic hard rock and heavy metal.

== See also ==
- Campus radio
- List of college radio stations in the United States
