= Axson, Georgia =

- Unincorporated community Census designated place
- Location within Georgia
- Coordinates: 31°16′35″N 82°44′04″W
- Country: United States
- State: Georgia
- County: Atkinson
- Elevation: 144 ft (44 m)
- Time zone: UTC-5 (Eastern (EST))
  - Summer (DST): UTC-4 (EDT)
- ZIP code: 31624
- Area code: 912
- GNIS feature ID: 2812665

Axson is an unincorporated community and census designated place (CDP) in Atkinson County, Georgia, United States. The community is located on U.S. Route 82, 7.1 miles (11.4 km) east of Pearson. Axson has a post office with ZIP code 31624. Per the 2020 census, the population was 360.

== History ==
An early variant name was "McDonald's Mill". A post office called Axson has been in operation since 1916. The latter name is after First Lady Ellen Axson Wilson.

== Demographics ==
Historical population
| Census | Pop. | Note | %± |
|---|---|---|---|
| 2020 | 360 | | — |
U.S. Decennial Census; 2020

Axson first appeared as a census designated place in the 2020 U.S. census.

=== 2020 Census ===
Axson CDP, Georgia – Racial and ethnic composition Note: the US Census treats Hispanic/Latino as an ethnic category. This table excludes Latinos from the racial categories and assigns them to a separate category. Hispanics/Latinos may be of any race.
| Race / Ethnicity (NH = Non-Hispanic) | Pop 2020 | % 2020 |
|---|---|---|
| White alone (NH) | 186 | 51.67% |
| Black or African American alone (NH) | 14 | 3.89% |
| Native American or Alaska Native alone (NH) | 0 | 0.00% |
| Asian alone (NH) | 0 | 0.00% |
| Pacific Islander alone (NH) | 0 | 0.00% |
| Other race alone (NH) | 0 | 0.00% |
| Mixed race or Multiracial (NH) | 2 | 0.56% |
| Hispanic or Latino (any race) | 158 | 43.89% |
| Total | 360 | 100.00% |

At the 2020 census, the CDP had a population of 360. Among its population, 51.67% were non-Hispanic white, 3.89% African American, and 43.89% Hispanic or Latino of any race.
