= KCSU-FM =

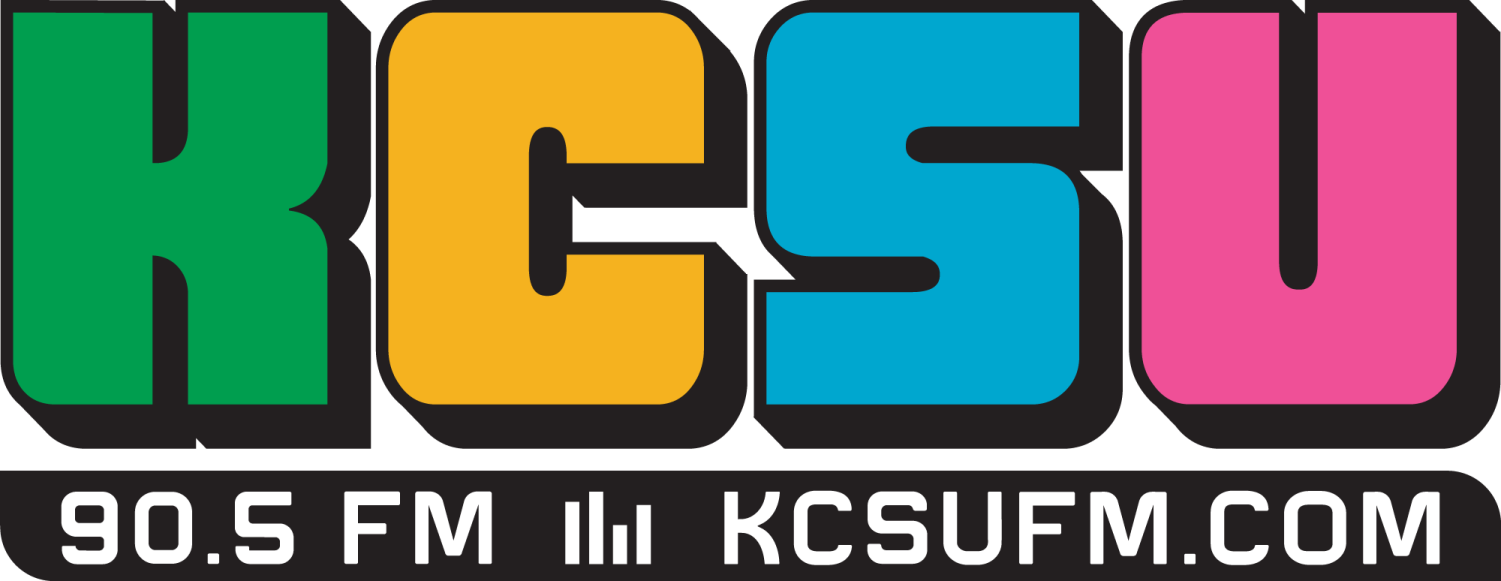
- Fort Collins, Colorado; United States
- Frequency: 90.5 MHz
- Branding: Student Run Radio 90.5

Programming
- Format: College radio

Ownership
- Owner: Board of Governors of the Colorado State University System

History
- First air date: September 26, 1964
- Call sign meaning: Colorado State University

Technical information
- Licensing authority: FCC
- Facility ID: 62435
- Class: C3
- ERP: 10,000 watts
- HAAT: -108 meters

Links
- Public license information: Public file; LMS
- Webcast: Listen Live
- Website: kcsufm.com

KCSU-FM (90.5 FM) is Colorado State University's non-commercial, student-run, campus radio station licensed to Fort Collins, Colorado. KCSU broadcasts at 10,000 watts, reaching east to Greeley, south to Longmont, and north to the Wyoming border. KCSU a 501c3 non-profit organization affiliated with Rocky Mountain Student Media Corporation and is one of the largest college radio stations in the country. The KCSU broadcast signal reaches over 250,000 people.

== Format ==
KCSU is music intensive, focusing on college and alternative musical genres. KCSU also provides newscasts, sports updates, a public affairs talk show, and Public Service Announcements (PSAs). However, there are three different show formats that make up the majority of KCSU programming.

== History ==
On September 21, 1964, the station went on air stating “This is KCSU FM, 90.9 megacycles, in Fort Collins, Colorado, the voice of Colorado State University.” KCSU began as a student operated station and broadcast at 800 watts from a transmitter located at the corner of Prospect Road and Shields Street. KCSU broadcast Monday through Friday from 4 p.m. to midnight. Programs first heard on KCSU included jazz and classical music, news, interviews and public affairs. In September of 1977, KCSU changed from student management to a professional station, and the station began airing 18 hours a day, 365 days a year. The change to professional management occurred after financial problems surfaced and students complained that student managers and staff were no longer representing the music and programming interests of students. On March 1, 1981, station management adopted a classical format with a strong commitment to news and information. The new format created problems with the student population, which continued to fund the station with student fees without a voice in programming choices. In September 1983, KCSU boosted its signal from 2,400 watts to 10,000 watts and changed from 90.9 MHz to the present-day frequency of 90.5. In response to student complaints about programming and budgetary problems due to insufficient financial support in the Fort Collins community, KCSU shifted from classical programming to an adult album alternative format in 1992. The change was not enough, and the Campus Radio Committee was formed in the fall of 1994. The Campus Radio Committee recommended that KCSU change from an entirely professionally run, public radio station to a campus radio station with a blend of student program management and professional operations management and advisers on July 1, 1995.

A massive flood hit Fort Collins on July 27th, 1997 and Colorado State University was extensively damaged. The destruction of the radio station’s studios, equipment and offices, along with all of the Student Media (Campus TV, The Rocky Mountain Collegian newspaper, and the Silver Spruce Yearbook at the time) forced the station to relocate to the annex at the old Fort Collins High School.

On August 20, 1997, Three weeks after the flood, KCSU resumes broadcasting using donated and salvaged equipment. KCSU began broadcasting from an old garage, affectionately called the “bus barn”, and staff dealt with, security issues, DJ and listener dissent, and a hurt public image caused by lower broadcast quality as a result of the flood-damaged equipment. Despite these setbacks, KCSU won several radio awards and the title of the Fort Collins Coloradoan’s Best of Fort Collins. On January 5, 1999, KCSU moved back to campus and became operational at its current location. KCSU resumed broadcast operations in a new, state-of-the-art radio studio, one of the best equipped in Colorado. Broadcast quality dramatically improved thanks to new digital signal processors, better production equipment, and a new broadcast board. New production facilities and a performance studio were added to KCSU, as well as new office space.

On August 1, 2008, KCSU and the rest of Student Media (Collegian, CTV, College Avenue) became a 501c3, not-for-profit organization independent from the University called The Rocky Mountain Student Media Corp. In May 2013, KCSU and the rest of Student Media began their move to their temporary home while the Colorado State University Student Center undergoes renovations. KCSU began broadcasting from its new location, 706 S College Ave. Suite 207 later in the month. KCSU moved back to the Student Center in September of 2014.

== See also ==
- Campus radio
- List of college radio stations in the United States
