= WTGF =

- Milton, Florida; United States
- Broadcast area: Pensacola, Florida
- Frequency: 90.5 MHz
- Branding: Truth Radio 90.5 FM

Programming
- Format: Southern Gospel

Ownership
- Owner: Faith Baptist Ministries; (Faith Bible College, Inc.)

History
- First air date: 1993-05-14
- Call sign meaning: Where Truth Goes Forth

Technical information
- Licensing authority: FCC
- Facility ID: 20474
- Class: C3
- ERP: 24,000 watts
- HAAT: 75 meters
- Transmitter coordinates: 30°36′15.00″N 87°7′45.00″W

Links
- Public license information: Public file; LMS
- Webcast: http://wtgffm.com/listen-live/
- Website: http://wtgffm.com

WTGF (90.5 FM) is a radio station broadcasting a Southern Gospel format. Licensed to Milton, Florida, United States, the station serves the Pensacola area. The station is currently owned by, and is a ministry of, Faith Baptist Ministries.

== History ==
The station went on the air as WTGF on 1993-05-14. According to FCC records, the station was silent, and its calls were deleted (as "DWTGF") from 2004-08-31 until 2004-10-21.
