= WVBU-FM =

- Lewisburg, Pennsylvania; United States
- Frequency: 90.5 MHz

Programming
- Format: Public radio

Ownership
- Owner: Northeastern Pennsylvania Educational Television Association

History
- First air date: 1965

Technical information
- Licensing authority: FCC
- Facility ID: 7722
- Class: A
- ERP: 225 watts
- HAAT: −10 meters (−33 ft)
- Transmitter coordinates: 40°57′18.3″N 76°52′53.8″W

Links
- Public license information: Public file; LMS
- Webcast: Listen live
- Website: www.wvia.org/radio/

WVBU-FM (90.5 MHz) is a public broadcasting station licensed to Lewisburg, Pennsylvania, United States. The station is owned by Northeastern Pennsylvania Educational TV, the owner and operator of WVIA-FM and other broadcasting outlets in the region. For most of its broadcasting life, WVBU-FM was owned by Bucknell University, and operated as a student-run activity. It was commonly known as the “Voice of Bucknell University.”

== History ==
=== Early years ===
Experiments in radio transmission began as early as 1924 on the Bucknell University campus. Periods of experimentation, hiatuses, and collaborations with other broadcasters followed in the next four decades. In 1933, the original Bucknell Campus Radio Station was sold to a C.S. Blue in Northumberland. In 1948 Stanley C. Marshall, Alice Z. Marshall, and Paul N. Bosted successfully reclaimed the station. Early plans indicate that WVBU members believed the station could reach a potential audience of a quarter million people in Montour, Northumberland, Lycoming, Union, and Snyder counties. After considering both AM and FM broadcasting options, the station initially settled on the AM frequency. However, the AM line eventually became a closed circuit (i.e., "carrier current") channel, to be heard only within the Bucknell community. In response to listener concerns and requests, WVBU switched to FM broadcasting on March 1, 1963. WVBU-FM received its first license on October 28, 1965.

=== First decade as a student-run radio station ===
The WVBU radio station became a vibrant hub of media activity beginning in the late 1960s. Its facilities were located in the Freshman Quad Carnegie Building basement "Fallout Shelter". The compact complex contained separate FM and AM on-air studios with announcing booths, and an audio production facility with an impressive vinyl record library. A large staff of volunteers offered a variety of programs on FM and AM channels that included music, news, sports and some listener-supported programming from the Pacifica Foundation.

Station staff and officers also furnished key leadership in other campus media and entertainment enterprises. A notable example was the “Bucknell Concert Committee” which presented a rich program of premier musical acts. The committee's accomplishments were chronicled in a book published by Billboard magazine by Andy Meyer titled "Dancing on the Seats". Other student-initiated activities included an alternate literary periodical (The Different Drummer), a mobile video collective service (University TV) modeled on the Videofreex, and a two-semester special studies course in Media Studies.

=== Revitalization in the late 1970s ===
In the mid-1970s, WVBU's AM and FM studios were located in the Freshman Quad Carnegie Building basement "Fallout Shelter". The stations had fallen into disarray until a major revitalization was undertaken by Terry Ginn ('77; FM Program Director), Paul "The round mound of sound" Hill ('78; Production Manager, recently deceased), Brad Joblin ('77; AM Program Director and subsequently Station Manager) and Rick Ambrose ('77) & John Cox ('78) (music directors). Ambrose completely restored the album library by securing promotional status from all the major record labels. In a three-year period, more than 10,000 LPs were replaced or added. The FM station format went 24-hour progressive album rock while in February 1975, Joblin re-branded WVBU(AM) as Super64 Non-Stop Music, converting the format from progressive rock to Top 40, due to listener demand and to avoid both stations competing under the same format.

Ambrose also established the Intercollegiate Broadcasting Network where major artists were interviewed and 90-minute taped specials were created. Participating college radio stations across the country received free copies in exchange for a blank reel of tape and postage. Artists interviewed by Ambrose and Joblin included Gerry Beckley of America, Elton John, Todd Rundgren, George Harrison, Alice Cooper, John Entwistle of The Who, Ian Anderson of Jethro Tull, and Rick Wakeman of Yes. These artists also recorded promo IDs for WVBU which aired throughout the broadcast day for many years.

In the same mid-1970s time period that WVBU AM and FM were revitalized, Brad Joblin and Jim Vose ‘75 took the Bucknell Concert Committee independent from outside promoters and booked Todd Rundgren, America, Santana, Billy Joel, Frankie Valli and The Four Seasons, Paul Simon and Bruce Springsteen. The Springsteen booking coincided with him the gracing the covers of both Time and Newsweek magazines. Ambrose succeeded Joblin as Chairman and produced the Bruce Springsteen concert, as well as booking Loggins & Messina and Marshall Tucker. Another WVBU staff member, Gary Huerich ('79), booked the band Boston. These concerts were presented in Bucknell's Davis Gym to 3,000 to 4,000 people, from both Bucknell and the central Pennsylvania area. Although Aerosmith had also been scheduled in 1976, the university administration deemed them "too loud" and cancelled the date. Joblin went on to work for NBC in New York, was on the production team for Late Night With David Letterman, became Vice President, Network Planning and partnered with Dick Clark to develop network television programming; Ambrose was hired by Chrysalis Records in Los Angeles as National Director of Media & Publicity, working with artists Jethro Tull, Pat Benatar, Ian Hunter, UFO, Blondie, Billy Idol, Steve Hackett, Christopher Lee and legendary Beatles producer George Martin.

=== Later developments under Bucknell ownership ===
On March 21, 1980, the station received financial approval from the student-run ABS Congress for the purchase of necessary equipment to convert from 10 to 190 watts. The ABS Congress granted WVBU $22,000, allowing it to comply with an FCC order that all 10-watt stations either up their power to 100 watts or go off the air entirely. This endowment provided the means for the station to continue its operations, and ultimately helped get WVBU to where it currently stands today.

In 2016, WVBU moved to a new location in Stuck House, which is located on the 7th Street entry street onto Bucknell's main campus.

=== Ownership by Northeastern Pennsylvania Educational Television Association ===
On April 23, 2019, it was announced that Bucknell University had agreed to sell WVBU-FM to Northeastern Pennsylvania Educational TV Association, owner of WVIA-FM in Scranton. The buyer has operated an FM translator relaying WVIA-FM to the Lewisburg area on 100.1 FM for several decades. The sale was consummated on July 31, 2019.
