= WVHM (FM) =

- Benton, Kentucky; United States
- Broadcast area: Benton, Kentucky; Murray, Kentucky; Mayfield, Kentucky; Paducah, Kentucky
- Frequency: 89.7 MHz
- Branding: Elevate FM

Programming
- Format: Contemporary Christian

Ownership
- Owner: Pennyrile Christian Community, Inc.
- Sister stations: WTRT, WAAJ

History
- First air date: November 1996
- Former call signs: WAAJ (1996–2023)

Technical information
- Licensing authority: FCC
- Facility ID: 78270
- Class: A
- ERP: 6,000 W
- HAAT: 91 m
- Transmitter coordinates: 36°48′31″N 88°13′26″W

Links
- Public license information: Public file; LMS
- Webcast: Listen Live
- Website: http://www.elevate.fm

WVHM (89.7 FM) is a contemporary Christian–formatted radio station licensed to Benton, Kentucky, United States, and serving the Jackson Purchase area of western Kentucky, including Paducah. The station is owned by Pennyrile Christian Community, Inc. as part of a triopoly with Southern Gospel station WTRT (88.1 FM) and Christian radio station WAAJ (90.5 FM). All three stations share studios on College Street in downtown Hardin, Kentucky, while its transmitter facilities are located off Cedar Knob Road in rural Marshall County, Kentucky southeast of Benton and northeast of Hardin.

== History ==
The station originally signed on in November 1996 as WAAJ, with a Christian Contemporary format under the branding The J-FM. In 2006 it switched formats to Bluegrass/Folk music. Then in October 2014, it returned to its original Christian Contemporary format.
