= WAAJ (FM) =

- Benton, Kentucky; United States
- Broadcast area: Paducah, Kentucky; Murray, Kentucky
- Frequency: 90.5 MHz
- Branding: Missionary Radio

Programming
- Format: Southern Gospel

Ownership
- Owner: Pennyrile Christian Community, Inc.
- Sister stations: WVHM, WTRT

History
- First air date: June 30, 1989
- Former call signs: WVHM (1989–2023)

Technical information
- Licensing authority: FCC
- Facility ID: 26646
- Class: C3
- ERP: 16,500 watts
- HAAT: 102 meters
- Transmitter coordinates: 36°48′31″N 88°13′26″W
- Repeaters: W206BB (89.1 FM, Madisonville, Kentucky)

Links
- Public license information: Public file; LMS
- Webcast: Listen Live
- Website: missionary.radio

WAAJ (90.5 FM) is a Southern Gospel–formatted radio station licensed to Benton, Kentucky, United States, and serving the greater Jackson Purchase area of western Kentucky, including Paducah. The station is currently owned by Pennyrile Christian Community, Inc. as part of a triopoly with Christian radio station WTRT (88.1 FM) and contemporary Christian station WVHM (89.7 FM). All three stations share studios on College Street in downtown Hardin, Kentucky, while its transmitter facilities are off Dowdy Cemetery Road south of Benton.

In order to broaden its broadcast and listening area, WAAJ operates an FM translator on 89.1 FM (W206BB) in Madisonville, Kentucky. That station's transmitter is located on the campus of the North Campus of the Madisonville Community College.

== History ==
Former logo for Heartland Ministries.

WAAJ was launched as WVHM, a local Christian radio outlet for western Kentucky on June 30, 1989. In the 1990s, the station aired programming from the Moody Radio network.

== Translators ==
In addition to the main station, WAAJ is relayed by an additional simulcast translator to widen its broadcast area.

Call sign	Frequency	City of license	FID	ERP (W)	Class	Transmitter coordinates	FCC info
W206BB	89.1 FM	Madisonville, Kentucky	93979	19	D	37°21′47″N 87°30′56″W	LMS
