= 89.7 FM =

FM radio frequency

The following radio stations broadcast on FM frequency 89.7 MHz:

== Argentina ==
- LRV362 in Franck, Santa Fe
- Radio María in Quitilipi, Chaco
- Radio María in San José de Feliciano, Entre Ríos
- Radio María in Los Antiguos, Santa Cruz
- Radio María in Venado Tuerto, Santa Fe

== Australia ==
- 2KY in Lithgow, New South Wales
- 2RES in Sydney
- Rhema FM in Tamworth, New South Wales
- Radio TAB in Gold Coast, Queensland
- 5TCB in Naracoorte, South Australia
- 5PBA in Adelaide, South Australia
- Triple J in Warrnambool, Victoria
- 6TCR in Perth, Western Australia

== Canada (Channel 209) ==
- CBCG-FM in Elk Lake, Ontario
- CBCM-FM in Penetanguishene, Ontario
- CBCX-FM in Calgary, Alberta
- CBEB-FM in Manitouwadge, Ontario
- CBF-FM-20 in Saint-Donat, Quebec
- CBKQ-FM in Dawson Creek, British Columbia
- CBM-FM-1 in Sherbrooke, Quebec
- CBU-FM-3 in Kelowna, British Columbia
- CFWN-FM in Cobourg, Ontario
- CHDO-FM in Dorval, Quebec (On 88.1 MHz)
- CJNG-FM in Quebec City, Quebec
- CJSU-FM in Duncan, British Columbia
- CKGN-FM in Kapuskasing, Ontario
- CKOA-FM in Glace Bay, Nova Scotia
- VF2315 in Avola, British Columbia
- VF2494 in New Hazelton, British Columbia
- VF7332 in Whistler, British Columbia
- VOAR-4-FM in Gander, Newfoundland and Labrador

== Guatemala (Channel 5) ==
- TGTO-FM in Guatemala City

== Israel ==
- Kan Gimel in Arabah, Beersheba, Eilat, the Galilee Panhandle, Gush Dan, Jerusalem, the Jordan Rift Valley, Negev

== Italy ==
- Rai Radio 1 in Rome

== Japan ==
- JODW-FM in Tokyo

== Malaysia ==
- Ai FM in Negeri Sembilan
- TraXX FM in Kuala Terengganu, Terengganu

== Mexico ==
- XEOYE-FM in Mexico City
- XHAK-FM in Acámbaro, Guanajuato
- XHCCCF-FM in Guasave, Sinaloa
- XHCSCB-FM in San Luis Potosí, San Luis Potosí
- XHCUM-FM in Cuautla, Morelos
- XHDP-FM in Ciudad Cuauhtémoc, Chihuahua
- XHEDL-FM in Hermosillo, Sonora
- XHEPA-FM in Puebla (Santa María Coronango), Puebla
- XHID-FM in Álamo, Veracruz
- XHIP-FM in Uruapan, Michoacán
- XHKJ-FM in Acapulco, Guerrero
- XHLAR-FM in Bacalar, Quintana Roo
- XHMZA-FM in Cihuatlán, Jalisco
- XHOCA-FM in Oaxaca, Oaxaca
- XHOPE-FM in Mazatlán, Sinaloa
- XHPECD-FM in Dolores Hidalgo, Guanajuato
- XHPNAV-FM in Navojoa, Sonora
- XHSMJ-FM in Santa María Jalapa del Marqués, Oaxaca
- XHSOC-FM in Saltillo, Coahuila
- XHUNL-FM in Monterrey, Nuevo León
- XHVX-FM in Villahermosa (Comalcalco), Tabasco

== Netherlands ==
- Arrow Jazz FM in Mierlo and Breda, North Brabant

== Philippines ==
- DYUM in Mabinay
- DYJU in Sagay

== Singapore ==
- Ria 89.7FM in Singapore

== United States (Channel 209) ==
- KACC in Alvin, Texas
- KANH in Emporia, Kansas
- KARM in Visalia, California
- KAUC (FM) in West Clarkston, Washington
- KAWA in Sanger, Texas
- KAXG in Gillette, Wyoming
- KAZK in Willcox, Arizona
- KBDA in Great Bend, Kansas
- KBHN in Booneville, Arkansas
- KBIL in Park City, Montana
- KBIO in Natchitoches, Louisiana
- KBSB in Bemidji, Minnesota
- KCEU in Price, Utah
- KCLM in Santa Maria, California
- KCMF in Fergus Falls, Minnesota
- KCNV in Las Vegas, Nevada
- KCVQ in Knob Noster, Missouri
- KEPC in Colorado Springs, Colorado
- KEUK in Eureka, Montana
- KFJC in Los Altos, California
- KGNX in Ballwin, Missouri
- KGRP in Grand Rapids, Minnesota
- KHYS in Hays, Kansas
- KIPE in Pine Hills, California
- KIPM in Waikapu, Hawaii
- KIWR in Council Bluffs, Iowa
- KJCV-FM in Country Club, Missouri
- KJLB in Lamar, Colorado
- KJMA in Floresville, Texas
- KJSA in Jonesboro, Arkansas
- KJTH in Ponca City, Oklahoma
- KJWA in Trinidad, Colorado
- KKTR in Kirksville, Missouri
- KLCC (FM) in Eugene, Oregon
- KLSF (FM) in Juneau, Alaska
- KLTB in Brownfield, Texas
- KLXP in Randsburg, California
- KLYX in Pioche, Nevada
- KMBN in Las Cruces, New Mexico
- KMNR in Rolla, Missouri
- KMOA in Nu'uuli, American Samoa
- KMSU in Mankato, Minnesota
- KMWS in Mount Vernon, Washington
- KNCA in Burney, California
- KNLP in Potosi, Missouri
- KNRI in Bismarck, North Dakota
- KNSY in Dubuque, Iowa
- KOAC-FM in Astoria, Oregon
- KOJD in John Day, Oregon
- KOTD in The Dalles, Oregon
- KOZO in Branson, Missouri
- KPCS (FM) in Princeton, Minnesota
- KQLR in Whitehall, Montana
- KRLE in Carbon Hill, Alabama
- KRMH in Red Mesa, Arizona
- KRUI in Iowa City, Iowa
- KRYJ in Craig, Colorado
- KSGN in Riverside, California
- KSQT in Prunedale, California
- KTDB in Ramah, New Mexico
- KTPS-FM in Pagosa Springs, Colorado
- KTXB in Beaumont, Texas
- KTYR in Trinity, Texas
- KUAP in Pine Bluff, Arkansas
- KUBJ in Brenham, Texas
- KUMB in Hollywood, Mississippi
- KUMM in Morris, Minnesota
- KUMS in White Sulphur Springs, Montana
- KUSD (FM) in Vermillion, South Dakota
- KUUT in Farmington, New Mexico
- KUWE in Evanston, Wyoming
- KVCI in Montezuma, Iowa
- KVRG in Chillicothe, Texas
- KWFJ in Roy, Washington
- KWJP in Paola, Kansas
- KWWS in Walla Walla, Washington
- KXGR in Loveland, Colorado
- KXKM in Mccarthy, Alaska
- WALF in Alfred, New York
- WAUV in Ripley, Tennessee
- WAWI in Lawrenceburg, Tennessee
- WBCW in Upland, Indiana
- WBMV in Mount Vernon, Illinois
- WCBW in East Saint Louis, Illinois
- WCPE in Raleigh, North Carolina
- WDCL in Somerset, Kentucky
- WDJW in Somers, Connecticut
- WDVR in Delaware Township, New Jersey
- WDVV in Wilmington, North Carolina
- WFGB in Kingston, New York
- WGBH (FM) in Boston, Massachusetts
- WGIW in Pilot Mountain, North Carolina
- WGLS in Glassboro, New Jersey
- WHFW in Winchester, Virginia
- WHND in Sister Bay, Wisconsin
- WHPA (FM) in Macomb, Illinois
- WISU in Terre Haute, Indiana
- WITR in Henrietta, New York
- WJHO in Alexander City, Alabama
- WJLU in New Smyrna Beach, Florida
- WJOJ in Rust Township, Michigan
- WKKM in Speaker Township, Michigan
- WKSU in Kent, Ohio
- WKVJ in Dannemora, New York
- WLMN in Manistee, Michigan
- WLNZ in Lansing, Michigan
- WLOL-FM in Star City, West Virginia
- WLSN in Grand Marais, Minnesota
- WLUJ in Springfield, Illinois
- WLXW in Waynesboro, Mississippi
- WMED in Calais, Maine
- WMHB in Waterville, Maine
- WMHK in Columbia, South Carolina
- WMLV in Miami, Florida
- WMUM in Cochran, Georgia
- WNHG in Grand Rapids, Michigan
- WNJA in Jamestown, New York
- WNJN in Atlantic City, New Jersey
- WNOC in Bowling Green, Ohio
- WNUX in Montgomery, West Virginia
- WOCR in Olivet, Michigan
- WOJC in Crothersville, Indiana
- WONU in Kankakee, Illinois
- WOSU in Columbus, Ohio
- WPAE in Centreville, Mississippi
- WQEJ in Johnstown, Pennsylvania
- WRDR in Freehold Township, New Jersey
- WRFI in Odessa, New York
- WRGF in Greenfield, Indiana
- WRHO in Oneonta, New York
- WRIQ in Charles City, Virginia
- WRRJ in Cocoa Beach, Florida
- WRTU in San Juan, Puerto Rico
- WRUC in Schenectady, New York
- WSHC in Shepherdstown, West Virginia
- WSPB in Bedford, Michigan
- WSSH in Lisbon, New Hampshire
- WSSK in Saratoga Springs, New York
- WTAC in Burton, Michigan
- WTBP in Bath, Maine
- WTBR in Pittsfield, Massachusetts
- WTKC in Findlay, Ohio
- WTMD in Towson, Maryland
- WTXR in Toccoa Falls, Georgia
- WUBS in South Bend, Indiana
- WUEC in Eau Claire, Wisconsin
- WUSF in Tampa, Florida
- WUWM in Milwaukee, Wisconsin
- WVFS in Tallahassee, Florida
- WVGV in West Union, West Virginia
- WVHM in Benton, Kentucky
- WVLS in Monterey, Virginia
- WVYA in Williamsport, Pennsylvania
- WWQE in Elberton, Georgia
- WXLD in Lowville, New York
- WXMD in California, Maryland
- WYBK in Chattanooga, Tennessee
- WYHH in Highland Heights, Kentucky
