= Moisés Dagdug Lützow =

Mexican politician and radio station owner

Moisés Félix Dagdug Lützow
- Born: 18 June 1950; Villahermosa, Tabasco, Mexico
- Died: 20 February 2016 (aged 65); Villahermosa, Tabasco, Mexico
- Education: UNAM
- Occupations: Politician, radio station owner
- Political party: PRD

Moisés Félix Dagdug Lützow (18 June 1950 – 20 February 2016) was a Mexican politician from the Party of the Democratic Revolution (PRD). From 2006 to 2009, he served in the Chamber of Deputies during the 60th Congress representing Tabasco's 3rd district.

== Life ==
Dagdug was born in 1950. He attended the National Autonomous University of Mexico (UNAM) and received his degree in mechanical engineering in 1974, as well as a master's degree in administration of state-owned enterprises from that institution in 1978.

From 1980 to 2000, Dagdug was the director of a travel agency, Viajes Kukulcan. Prior to that, he was an assistant director of the National Tourism Development Fund (FONATUR).

== Politics ==
After briefly being a member of the Institutional Revolutionary Party (PRI), Dagdug ran as a candidate for mayor of the town of Comalcalco.

In 2006, Dagdug was elected from the PRD to serve as deputy for Tabasco's third congressional district, which includes Comalcalco. In his three-year term, he served on the Radio, Television and Film Committee, where he was the secretary. He also served on the Energy Committee, as well as a special committee for regional development in south and southeastern Mexico and a committee analyzing ecological and social damage done by PEMEX. In 2008, several legislators demanded that Dagdug and several other legislators be kicked out from the PRD, having voted against their party on a legislative matter.

In 2008, Dagdug organized a telephone survey in Tabasco that indicated that 61% of those polled would be in favor of energy reform in Mexico.

== Radio ==
Dagdug also was involved in the radio business. In 1977, José Sabino Dagdug Jahirala acquired XEVX-AM in Comalcalco, and in 1987, Moisés and three other family members took control of the concession. In 2006, Moisés became the station's sole concessionaire. The station migrated to the FM band and is now known as XHVX-FM, broadcasting on 89.7 MHz. Grupo VX later expanded to include a local cable channel known as TVX, offering news and information programming.

Dagdug was also the president of the Tabasco Radio and Television Chamber, the state's association of broadcasters, on two occasions.

== Death ==
Dagdug died in an attempted robbery at his Villahermosa home on the morning of 20 February 2016. Several men entered his house through the roof, killed Dagdug and then fled in his white pickup truck, which was later located on the Villahermosa–Frontera highway.

Dagdug had previously received personal threats, according to colleagues, who noted that he had been a critic of the state government under Arturo Núñez Jiménez.
