= 3rd federal electoral district of Tabasco =

Federal electoral district of Mexico

Tabasco's 3rd
- Electoral district of the Chamber of Deputies of Mexico

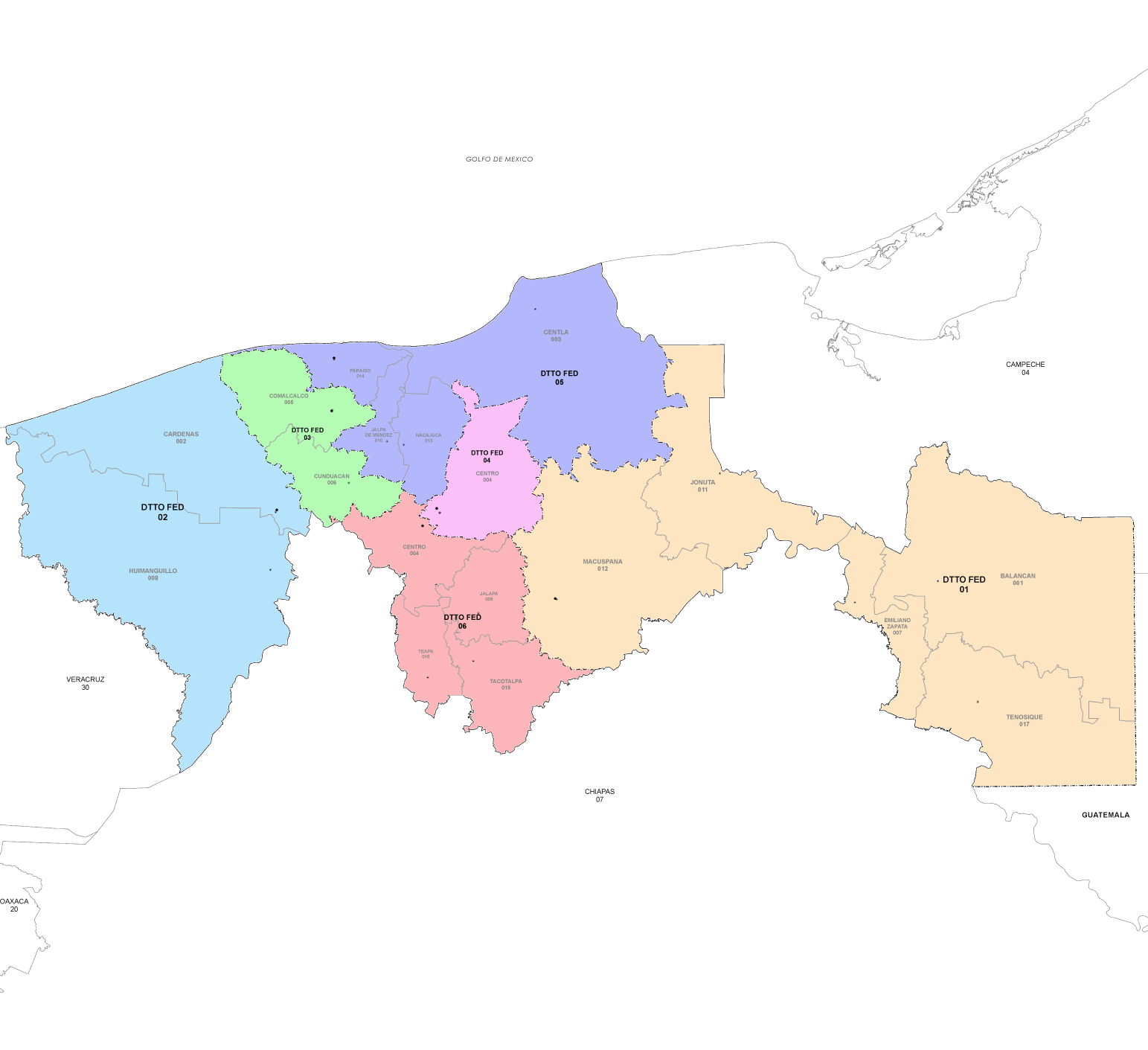
- 3rd district

Incumbent
- Member: Rosa Margarita Graniel
- Party: ▌Morena
- Congress: 66th (2024–2027)

District
- State: Tabasco
- Head town: Comalcalco
- Coordinates: 18°17′N 93°12′W
- Covers: Comalcalco, Cunduacán
- PR region: Third
- Precincts: 159
- Population: 354,198 (2020 census)

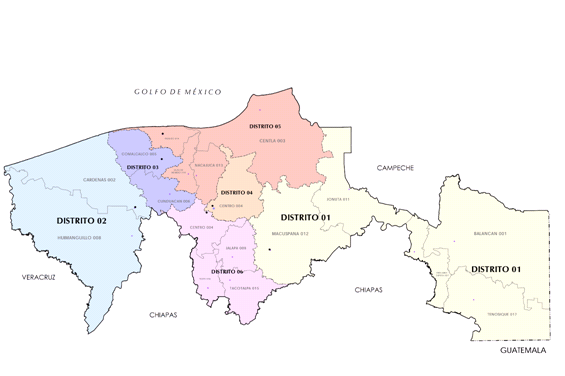
Tabasco's districts in 2017–2022

The 3rd federal electoral district of Tabasco (Spanish: Distrito electoral federal 03 de Tabasco) is one of the 300 electoral districts into which Mexico is divided for elections to the federal Chamber of Deputies and one of six such districts in the state of Tabasco.

It elects one deputy to the lower house of Congress for each three-year legislative session by means of the first-past-the-post system. Votes cast in the district also count towards the calculation of proportional representation ("plurinominal") deputies elected from the third region.

Suspended in 1930, (Note: An amendment to Article 52 of the Constitution in 1928 changed the original provision of "one deputy per 60,000 inhabitants" to "one deputy per 100,000"; as a result, the size of the Chamber of Deputies fell from 281 in the 1928 election to 171 in 1934.) Tabasco's 3rd was re-established under President Luis Echeverría (1970–1976). The restored district returned its first deputy in the 1973 mid-term election.

The current member for the district, elected in the 2024 general election, is Rosa Margarita Graniel Zenteno of the National Regeneration Movement (Morena).

== District territory ==
Under the 2023 districting plan adopted by the National Electoral Institute (INE), which is to be used for the 2024, 2027 and 2030 federal elections, Tabasco's 3rd district lies to the north-west of the state capital, Villahermosa, and covers 159 electoral precincts (secciones electorales) across two of the state's municipalities:

- Comalcalco and Cunduacán.

The head town (cabecera distrital), where results from individual polling stations are gathered together and tallied, is the city of Comalcalco. The district reported a population of 354,198 in the 2020 census.

== Previous districting schemes ==
Evolution of electoral district numbers
	1974	1978	1996	2005	2017	2023
Tabasco	3	5	6	6	6	6
Chamber of Deputies	196	300				

2017–2022

From 2017 to 2022, the district had the same configuration as in the 2023 scheme.

2005–2017

Under the 2005 scheme, the district covered the municipalities of Comalcalco and Cunduacán as in the later plans, but also included 29 precincts in the south-east corner of the neighbouring municipality of Cárdenas.

1996–2005

Tabasco gained its 6th district in the 1996 redistricting process. The 3rd covered the state's north-west, comprising the municipalities of Comalcalco, Cunduacán and Jalpa de Méndez, with the head town at Comalcalco.

1978–1996

The districting scheme in force from 1978 to 1996 was the result of the 1977 electoral reforms, which increased the number of single-member seats in the Chamber of Deputies from 196 to 300. Under that plan, Tabasco's seat allocation rose from three to five. The 3rd district's head town was at Cárdenas and it comprised the municipalities of Cárdenas and Huimanguillo.

== Deputies returned to Congress ==
(Mexico) National parties
- Current
- PAN
- PRI
- PT
- PVEM
- MC
- Morena
- PAZ
- Somos
- Defunct or local only
- PLM
- PNR
- PRM
- PNM
- PP
- PPS
- PARM
- PFCRN
- CON
- PANAL
- PSD
- PES
- PES
- PRD

Tabasco's 3rd district
Election	Deputy	Party	Term	Legislature
1916	Carmen Sánchez Magallanes		1916–1917	Constituent Congress of Querétaro
...
The 3rd district was suspended between 1930 and 1973
1973	Julián Montejo Velázquez	Institutional Revolutionary Party	1973–1976	49th Congress
1976	Francisco Rabelo Cupido	Institutional Revolutionary Party	1976–1979	50th Congress
1979	Carlos Mario Piñera Rueda	Institutional Revolutionary Party	1979–1982	51st Congress
1982	Andrés Sánchez Solís	Institutional Revolutionary Party	1982–1985	52nd Congress
1985	Homero Pedrero Priego	Institutional Revolutionary Party	1985–1988	53rd Congress
1988	Joaquín Ruiz Becerra	Institutional Revolutionary Party	1988–1991	54th Congress
1991	Mario Ross García	Institutional Revolutionary Party	1991–1994	55th Congress
1994	Carlos Mario de la Fuente Lazo	Institutional Revolutionary Party	1994–1997	56th Congress
1997	Carlos Fernando Rosas Cortés	Institutional Revolutionary Party	1997–2000	57th Congress
2000	Adela del Carmen Graniel Campos	Institutional Revolutionary Party	2000–2003	58th Congress
2003	Rogelio Rodríguez Javier	Institutional Revolutionary Party	2003–2006	59th Congress
2006	Moisés Félix Dagdug Lützow	Party of the Democratic Revolution	2006–2009	60th Congress
2009	César Francisco Burelo Burelo	Party of the Democratic Revolution	2009–2012	61st Congress
2012	Lorena Méndez Denis (Note: Originally elected for the PRD, Méndez Denis switched to the Citizen's Movement on 5 March 2013. On 3 February 2015 she switched again to Morena.)	Party of the Democratic Revolution Citizens' Movement (Mexico) National Regeneration Movement	2012–2015	62nd Congress
2015	Héctor Peralta Grappin	Party of the Democratic Revolution	2015–2018	63rd Congress
2018	Gregorio Efraín Espadas Méndez	National Regeneration Movement	2018–2021	64th Congress
2021	Lorena Méndez Denis	National Regeneration Movement	2021–2024	65th Congress
2024	Rosa Margarita Graniel Zenteno	National Regeneration Movement	2024–2027	66th Congress

=== Results ===
The corresponding page on the Spanish-language Wikipedia contains results of the congressional elections since 2003.

== Presidential elections ==
Tabasco's 3rd district
Election	District won by	Party or coalition	%
2018	Andrés Manuel López Obrador	Juntos Haremos Historia	74.5965
2024	Claudia Sheinbaum Pardo	Sigamos Haciendo Historia	76.7801
