= Rogelio Rodríguez Javier =

Mexican politician

- Born: 29 April 1958 (age 68); Comalcalco, Tabasco, Mexico
- Education: UJAT
- Occupation: Politician
- Political party: PRI

Rogelio Rodríguez Javier (born 29 April 1958) is a Mexican politician affiliated with the Institutional Revolutionary Party (PRI). In the 2003 mid-terms he was elected to the Chamber of Deputies to represent Tabasco's 3rd district during the 59th session of Congress.
