= XHVX-FM =

Radio station in Comalcalco–Villahermosa, Tabasco

Comalcalco, Tabasco; Mexico
- Frequency: 89.7 FM
- Branding: XEVX, La Grande de Tabasco

Programming
- Format: Full-service radio

Ownership
- Owner: Grupo VX; (Diana Patricia Chamelis Ruiz)

History
- First air date: June 13, 1959 (concession)

Technical information
- Class: B1
- ERP: 25 kW
- Transmitter coordinates: 18°15′54″N 93°13′07″W

Links
- Website: www.xevx.com

XHVX-FM is a radio station on 89.7 FM in Comalcalco, Tabasco, Mexico. The station is owned by Grupo VX, a business of the late radio entrepreneur and former federal deputy Moisés Félix Dagdug Lützow, and is known as "XEVX, La Grande de Tabasco" with a full-service and news format.

== History ==
XHVX began as XEVX-AM 570, which received its concession on June 13, 1959. It was owned by Aquiles Calderón Marchenas until 1977, when control passed to José Sabino Dagdug Jahirata. In 1987, Moisés Félix Dagdug Lützow and three other family members took control of the station's concession; Moisés would become sole concessionaire in 2006, and upon his death, the station was transferred to his estate. Around this time, XEVX increased its power tenfold to 10 kW day and 2.5 kW night.

In June 2010, XEVX was authorized to move to FM on 89.7 MHz.
