= Lorena Méndez Denis =

Mexican politician

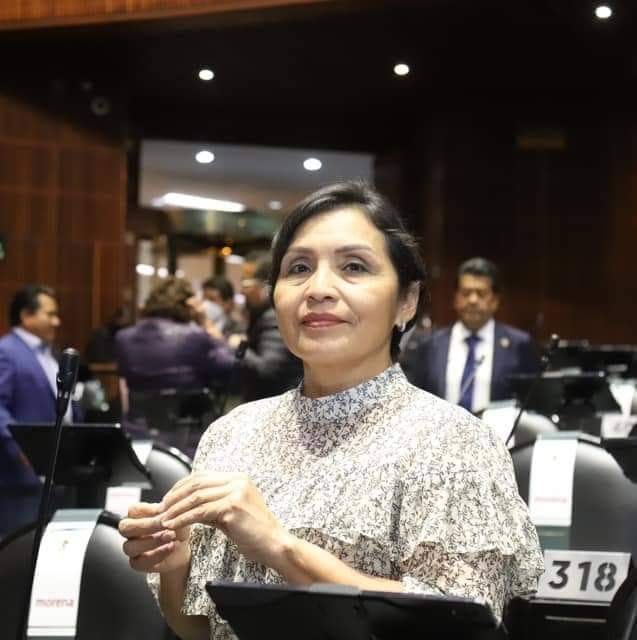
- Born: 6 November 1968 (age 57); Comalcalco, Tabasco, Mexico
- Occupation: Politician
- Political party: PRD (1996–2013), MC (2013–2014); MORENA (2014–present)

Lorena Méndez Denis (born 6 November 1968) is a Mexican politician from the National Regeneration Movement (Morena). She was formerly affiliated with both the Party of the Democratic Revolution (PRD) and the Citizens' Movement (MC).

Méndez Denis was born in Comalcalco, Tabasco, in 1968. She has been elected on two occasions to the Chamber of Deputies for Tabasco's 3rd district, which includes her home town: in the 2012 general election (62nd Congress), and in the 2021 mid-terms (65th Congress).

Originally elected to her first congressional term for the PRD, she switched to the Citizen's Movement on 5 March 2013. On 3 February 2015 she switched again to Morena. Her second term in Congress was as a member of Morena.

She was also the mayor of Comalcalco in 2018–2020.
