= CKOA =

CKOA may refer to:

- CKOA-FM, a radio station (89.7 FM) licensed to Glace Bay, Nova Scotia, Canada
- CKOA (AM), a defunct radio station (1490 AM) in Arnprior, Ontario, Canada
