= XHPECD-FM =

Radio station in Dolores Hidalgo, Guanajuato, Mexico

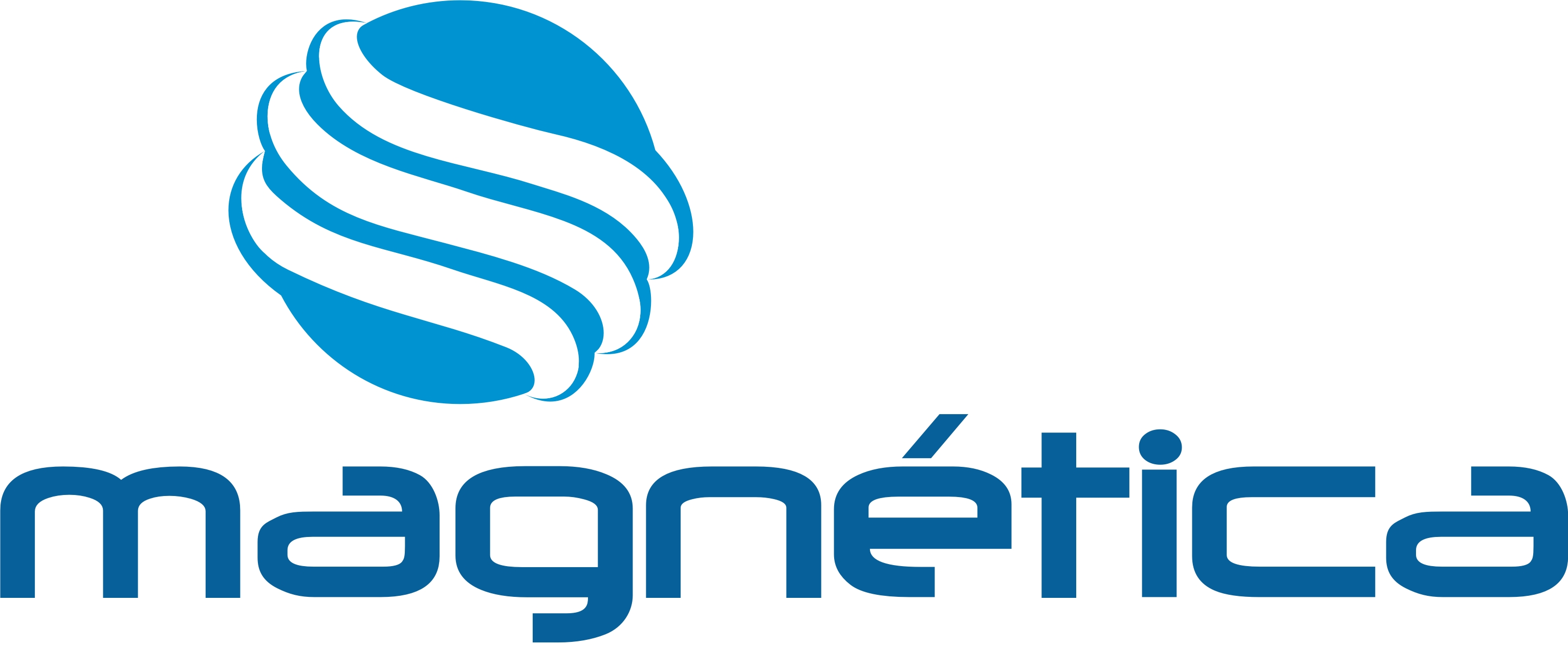
- Dolores Hidalgo, Guanajuato; Mexico
- Frequency: 89.7 FM
- Branding: Magnética FM

Programming
- Format: Spanish classic hits

Ownership
- Owner: Ciencia, Comunicación y Tecnología de Irapuato, A.C.
- Sister stations: XHAWD-FM (San Luis Potosí)

History
- First air date: December 2018
- Call sign meaning: (templated callsign)

Technical information
- Class: A
- ERP: 3 kW
- HAAT: 52.5 m
- Transmitter coordinates: 21°09′36.9″N 100°58′21.9″W

XHPECD-FM is a radio station on 89.7 FM in Dolores Hidalgo, Guanajuato. The station is owned by Ciencia, Comunicación y Tecnología de Irapuato, A.C. and known as Magnética FM, which offers a Spanish-language classic hits format.

== History ==
Ciencia, Comunicación y Tecnología filed for a permit station in Dolores Hidalgo on April 18, 2012. The social concession was approved on December 13, 2017.

XHPECD officially went on the air in December 2018 from a transmitter site west of town. It is a sister station to XHAWD-FM in the city of San Luis Potosí, which signed on in 2005.
