= Comalcalco (archaeological site) =

Ancient Mayan site in Tabasco, Mexico

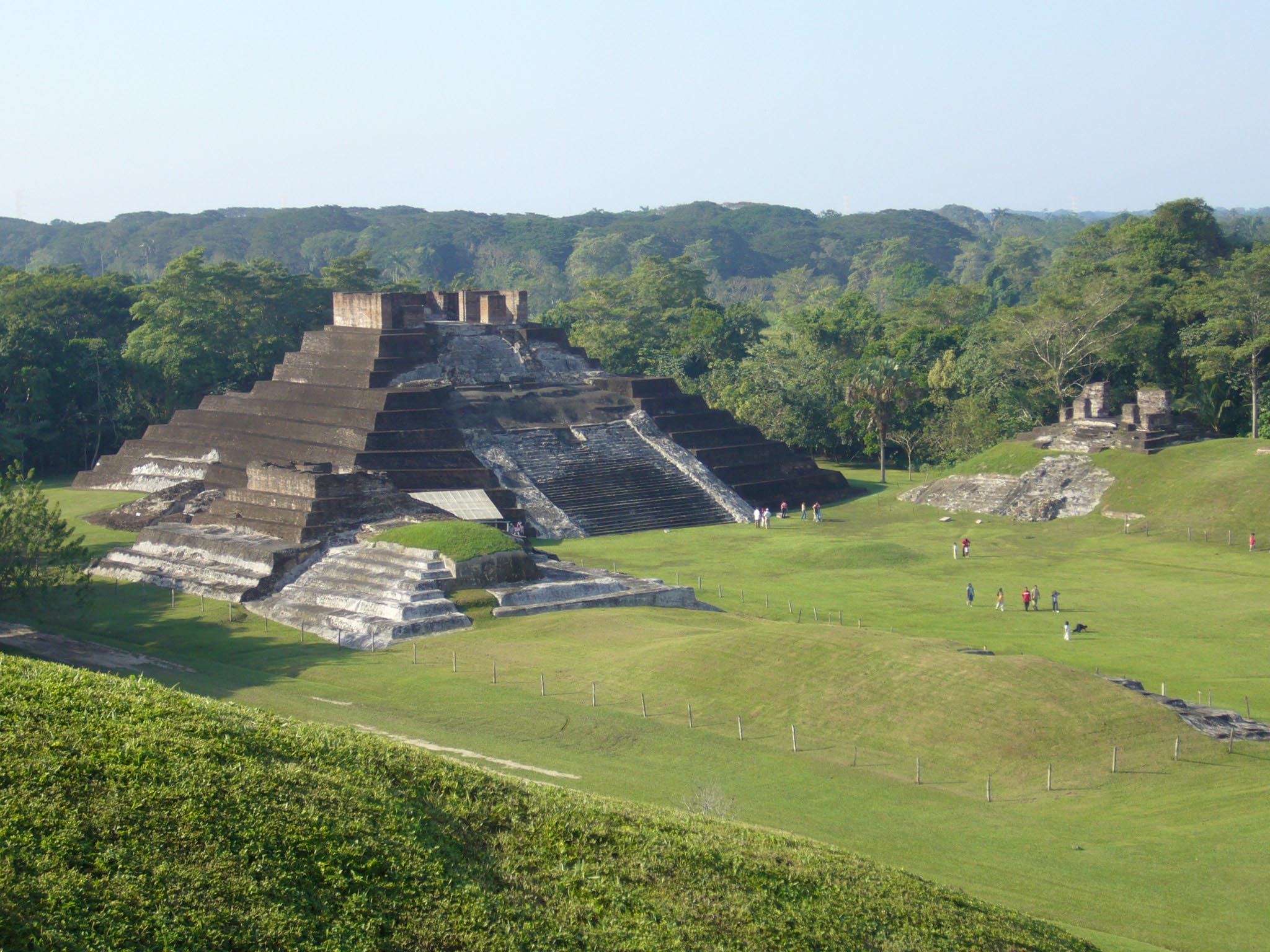
- Comalcalco Temple I
- Interactive map of Comalcalco
- 18°16′46″N 93°12′04″W
- Periods: Late Classic
- Cultures: Maya
- Location: Comalcalco, Tabasco, Mexico
- Region: Tabasco

History
- Built: ca. 550 CE
- Abandoned: ca. 1000 CE

Site notes
- Architectural style: Late Classic Maya Number of temples: 9
- Excavation dates: 1892, 1950s, 1960, 1994
- Archaeologists: Désiré Charnay, Frans Blom, Oliver LaFarge, George F. Andrews, Ponciano Salazar Ortegón, Gordon Ekholm, Román Piña Chan, Ricardo Armijo University of Tulane, American Museum of Natural History, INAH
- Governing body: INAH

Comalcalco is an ancient Maya archaeological site in the State of Tabasco, Mexico, adjacent to the modern city of Comalcalco and near the southern coast of the Gulf of Mexico. It is the only major Maya city built with bricks rather than limestone masonry and was the westernmost city of the Maya civilisation. Covering an area of 7 km^{2} (2.7 sq mi), Comalcalco was founded in the Late Classic period and may have been a satellite or colony of Palenque based on architectural similarities between the two. The city was a center of the Chontal Maya people.

== Etymology ==
The name is linked to the adjacent modern city of Comalcalco and derives from the Nahuatl words comalli (comales) calli (house) and the locative co, literally meaning "At the House of the Comales" or "Place of the House of the Comales". This name is a reference to the bricks of the ruined Maya site, which later people thought resembled comales. The ancient place name associated with Comalcalco is Joy Chan pronounced [hoj tʃan], (also spelled Hoi Chan), which means "round sky" or "clouded sky".

== Location ==
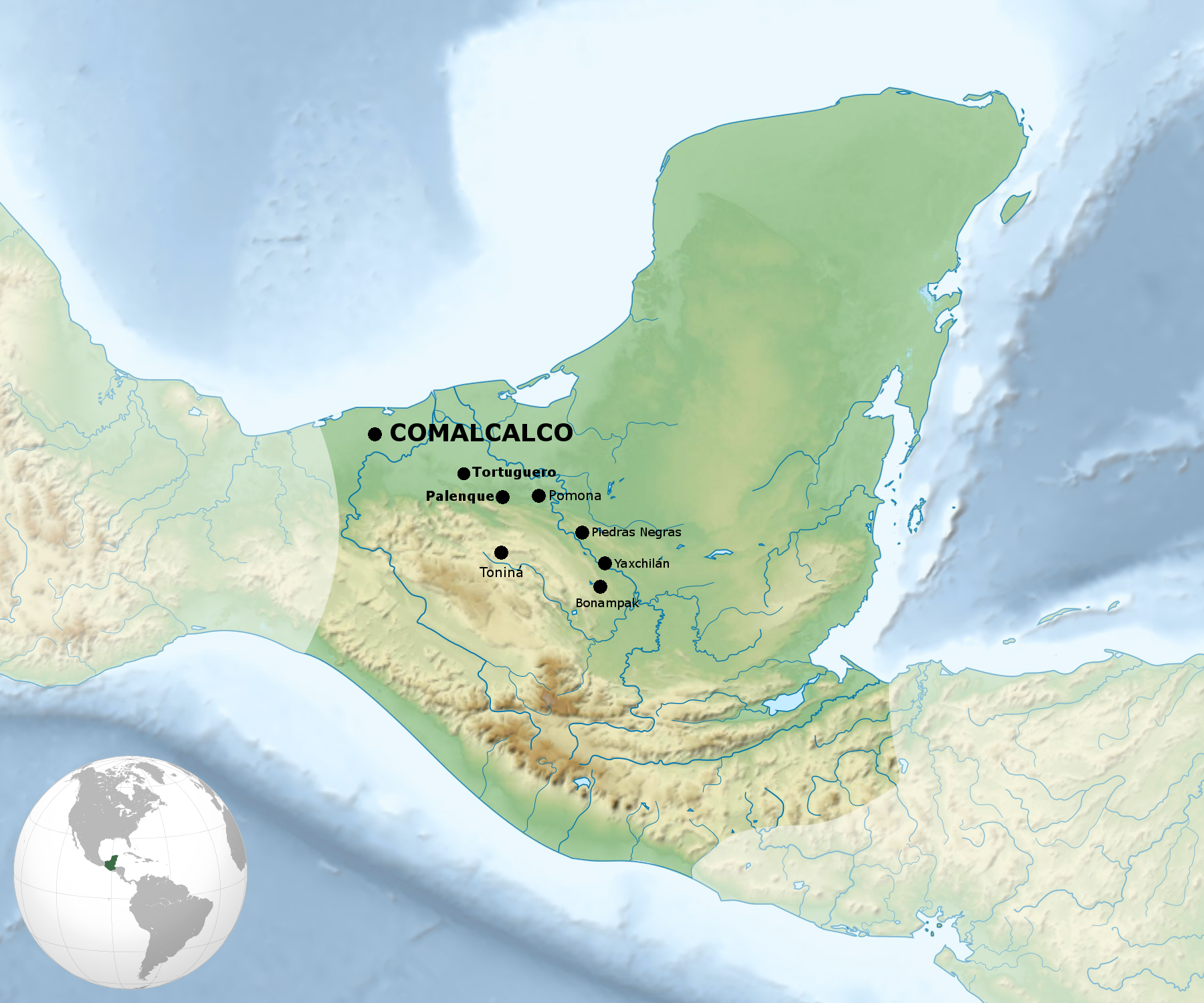
Comalcalco's location in relation to other eastern Maya cities

Located in the Chontalpa region on an extensive alluvial plain once covered by low evergreen rainforest interspersed with mangrove swamps, Comalcalco lies 2 km (1.2 mi) west of the modern city of Comalcalco on a small rise surrounded by lowlands. It is 51 km (32 mi) from the city of Villahermosa, and approximately 100 mi (160 km) north of Palenque. Before modern times the important Mezcalapa River flowed 900 m (3,000 ft) east of the main buildings in the site.

== Economy ==
The city's strategic placement on the old Mezcalapa River meant that Comalcalco controlled the important trading link between Yucatán and the Gulf Coast and the highlands of Chiapas and Guatemala. Archaeologist George F. Andrews of the University of Oregon believes that since Comalcalco was in the largest cacao production zone in Tabasco, it must have been involved in the distribution of this commodity.

=== Pottery ===
Comalcalco was also an important centre of clay figurine production and commerce between 600 and 1000 CE In and around the site, archaeologists have found identical clay moulds and figures, as well as tools, pit kilns and dumping grounds, indicating standardized mass production. Figurines found on Jaina Island, approximately 350 km (220 mi) away on the Yucatán Peninsula, use clay with the same chemical composition as those of Comalcalco. Unlike the funerary objects used on Jaina Island, the figurines of Comalcalco seemed to be meant for daily use. Certain representations appear more frequently in the ceremonial core (rulers, dwarfs, articulated figures), while others (women) are more common in residential areas.

== History ==
The site reached its peak during the classic period in around 500 CE, although the area had been inhabited long before this date. The oldest item found on the site has been dated to August 10, 561 CE.

The only known ruler of Comalcalco was Ox Balam, who appears in an inscription from the Tortuguero archaeological site. According to that text, Ox Balam was defeated by Tortuguero's Balam Ahau on December 20, 649 CE. In later times, Comalcalco used the emblem glyph of B'aakal associated with Palenque and Tortuguero, presumably due to conquest by the latter polity.

A tomb found in Temple II (see below) references numerous late 8th century rituals associated with rain deities. The city possibly suffered from the severe drought that may have occurred throughout the region, and may have been at least partly responsible for the Classical Maya collapse.

The last date found on inscriptions at the site is March 7, 814, although habitation continued into the post-classic period until the site was abandoned around 1000 CE.

=== Modern history ===
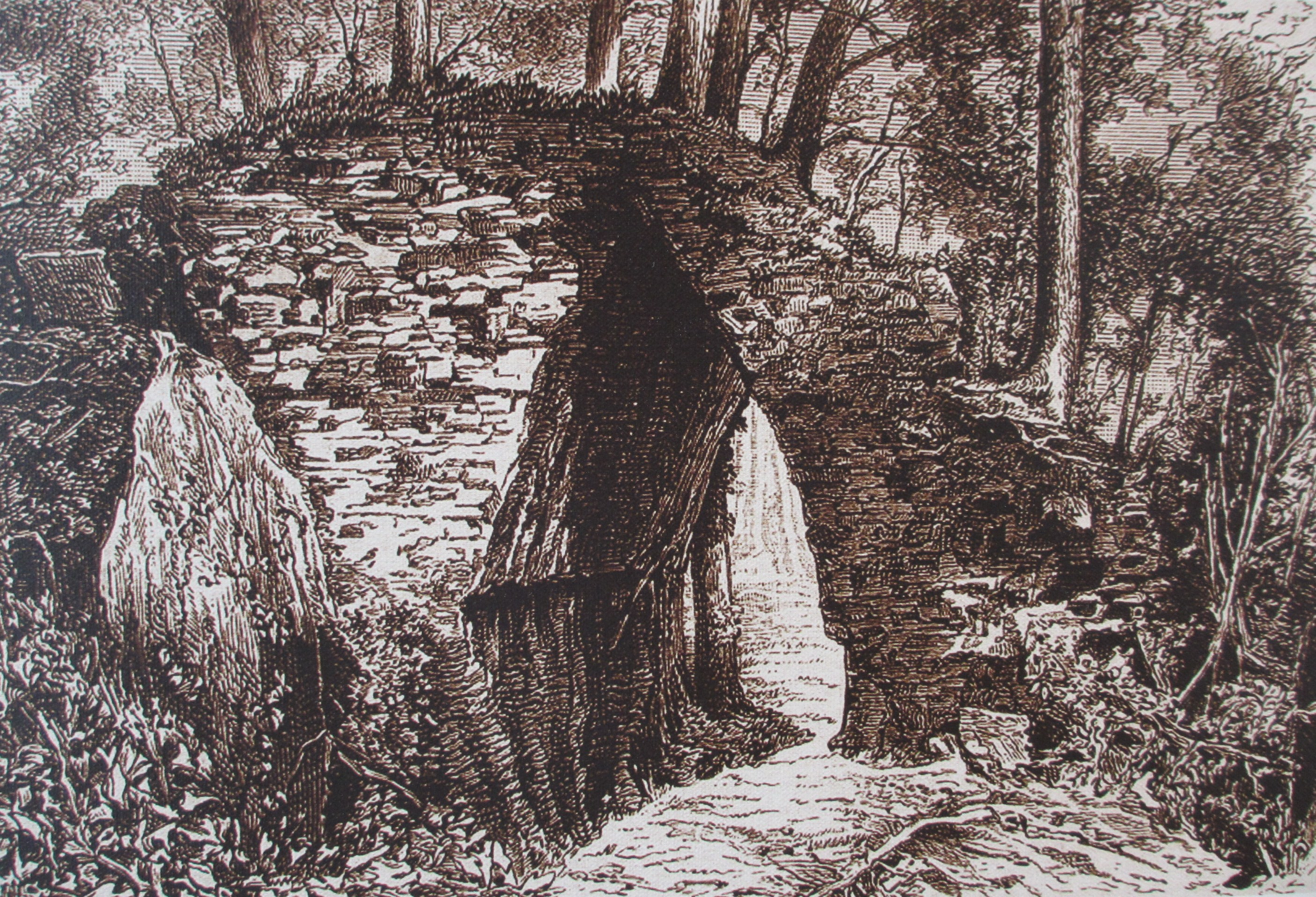
A lithograph of Comalcalco by Désiré Charnay

Désiré Charnay was the first person to bring outside attention to the ruins following his 1880 visit. He reported "Thousands of pyramids of colossal dimensions." Charnay examined what would later be termed the Great Acropolis in some detail, noting the architectural affinities of the palace with that of Palenque.

Comalcalco native Pedro Romero was the first Mexican to report on a dig at the site. He discovered that the buildings were made of bricks in 1892.

Frans Blom and Oliver LaFarge, conducted a survey of the site in 1925 and refuted Charnay's claims about its monumental size. Later, in the 1950s, Gordon Ekholm excavated other buildings and removed some bricks that are still stored in the American Museum of Natural History. Román Piña Chan was in charge of archaeological work when Comalcalco was first surveyed in detail and its structures catalogued by George F. Andrews in 1966.

Ponciano Salazar Ortegón also worked extensively at the site beginning in 1972 until his death. Later, Ricardo Armijo was in charge of excavations in the 1990s.

A site museum was opened in 2012.

== The Site ==
=== Architecture ===
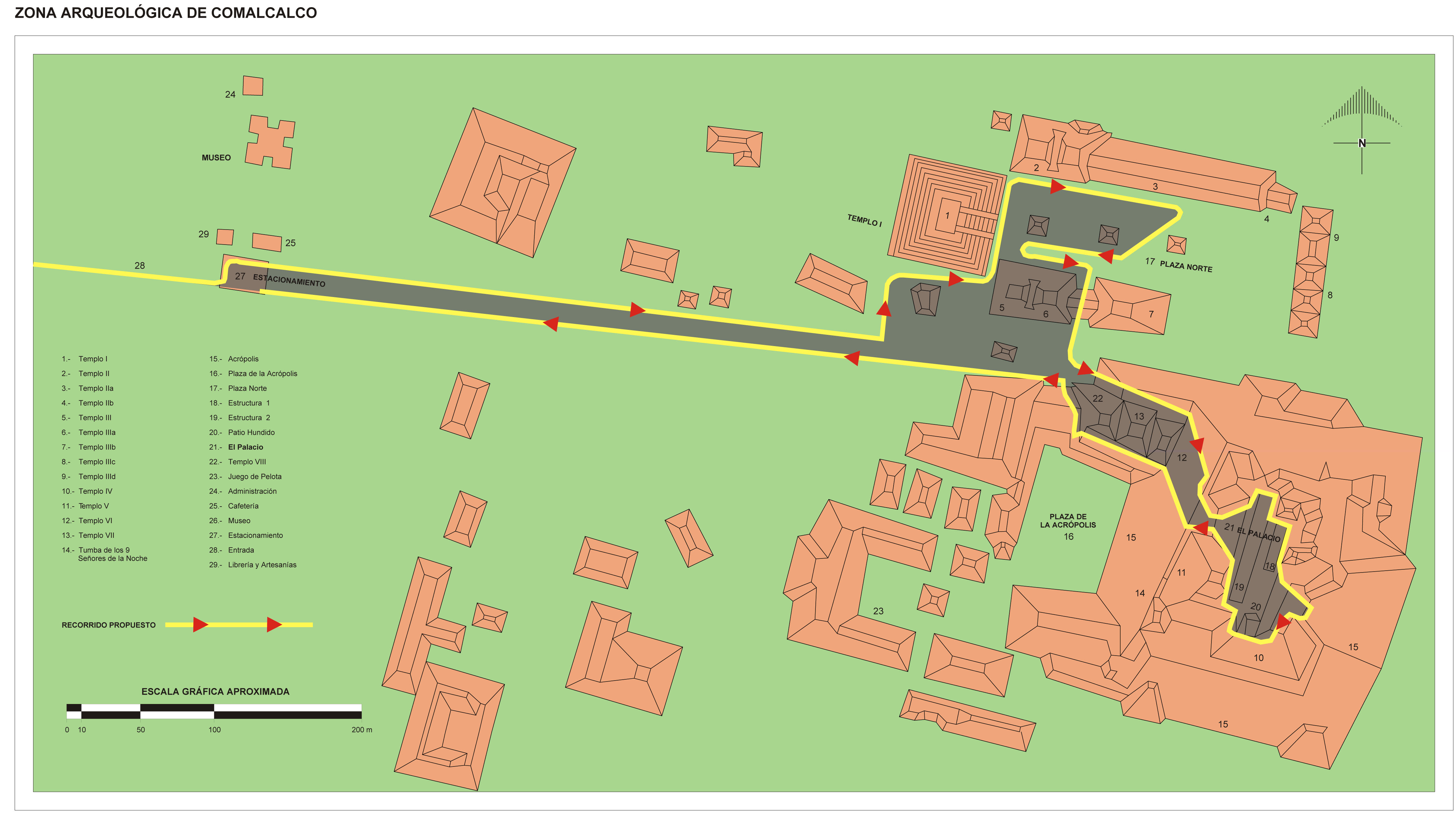
A map of Comalcalco

The most unusual feature of the ancient city is its use of fired clay bricks for construction as opposed to the quarried limestone common in the vast majority of Classical Maya sites. The bricks are of irregular sizes and seem to have been made by cutting longer sections of clay rather than with moulds. Many have designs and inscriptions painted, printed or etched into them. The bricks were joined by mortar made of calcinated seashells and oysters possibly gathered at the nearby Mecoacan Lagoon.

Bricks from Comalcalco
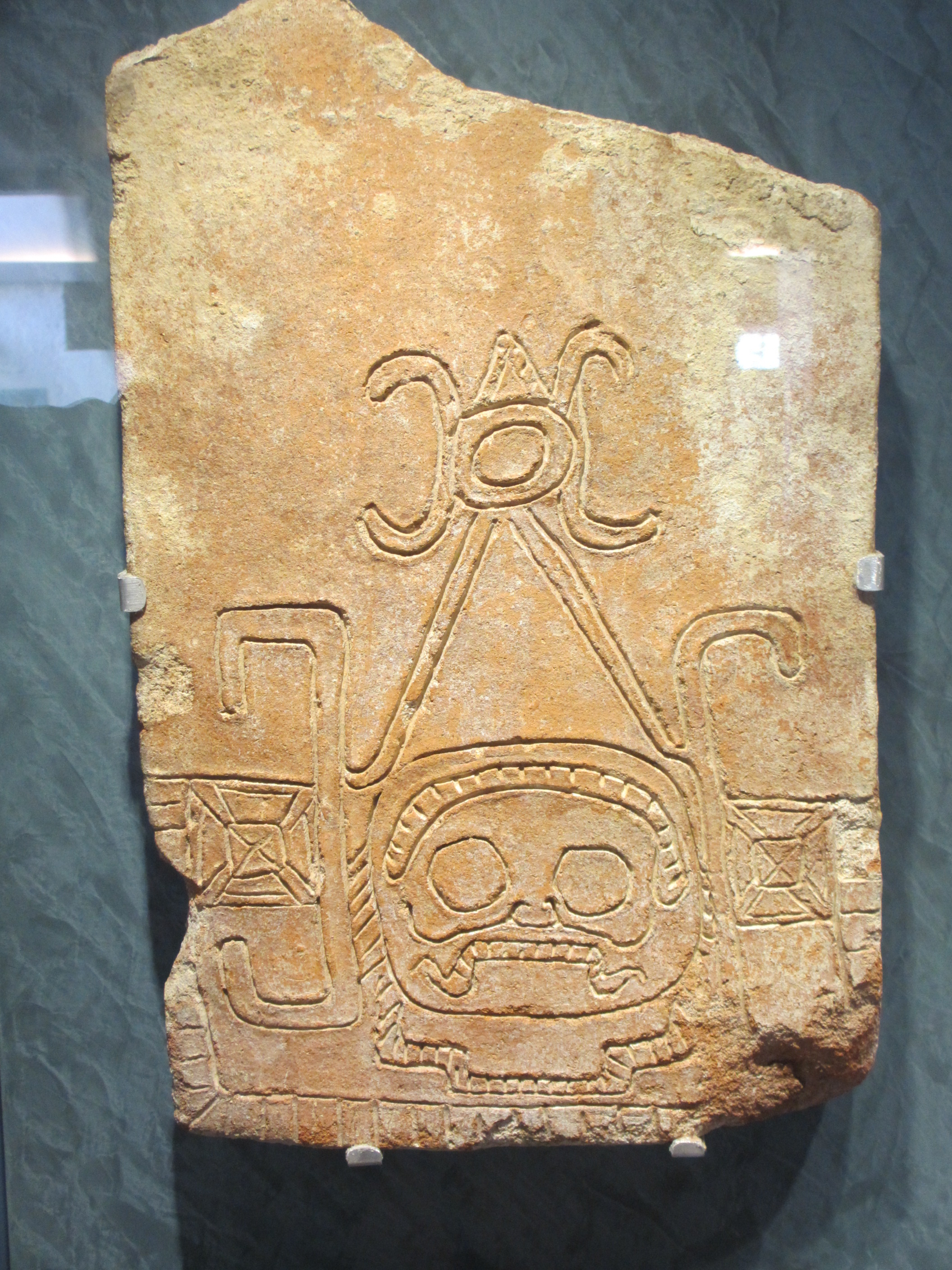

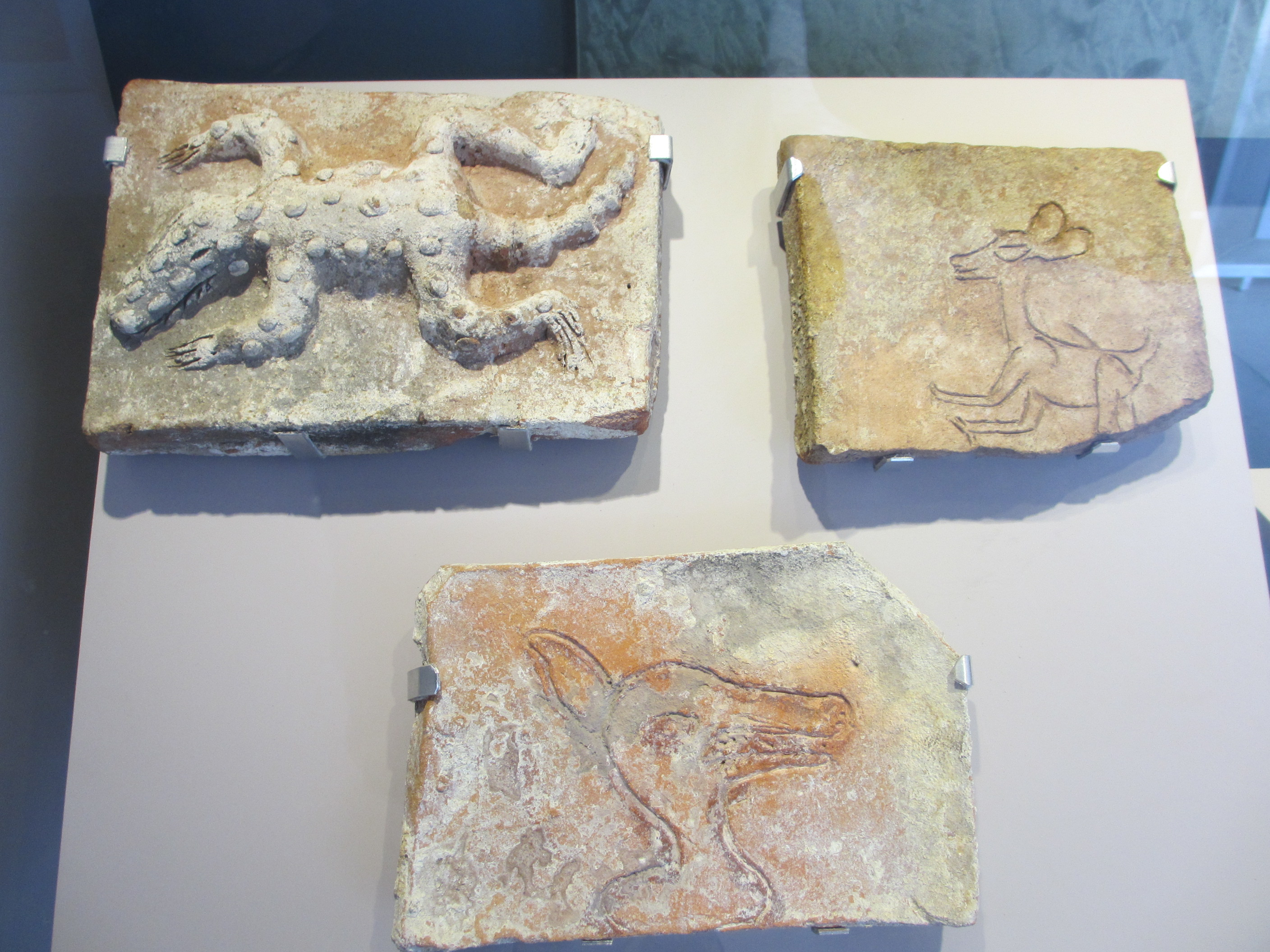

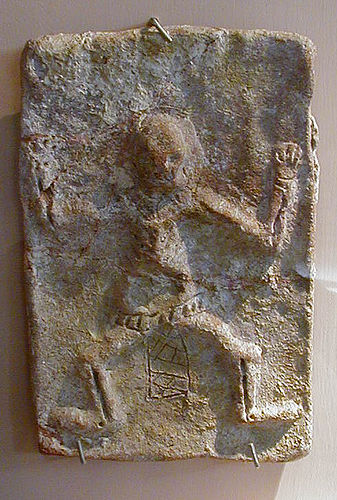
The carved sides of bricks faced inward, and were not visible.

Archaeologists have identified two distinct construction stages so far. After conducting his 1966 survey, Andrews concluded that the lack of significant differences in architectural style between the buildings indicated that they were built within a relatively short period of time. Buildings of the first stage were made with flattened earth covered with lime, while those of the second were covered with brickwork.

Palenque-style architecture was apparently superimposed on the local buildings, giving further credence to the theory that Comalcalco was conquered by Palenque's B'aakal kingdom and perhaps even became a successor state. Similarities with Palenque's architecture abound and include floor plans of temples, vaulted ceilings and built-in altars. Several bricks show drawings of temples with roof combs, another feature of Palenque, though no roof combs have survived into modern times.

Well executed stucco decorations, once painted in bright colours, are another characteristic of the site. As in Palenque, these refer to religious, mythological or ceremonial elements.

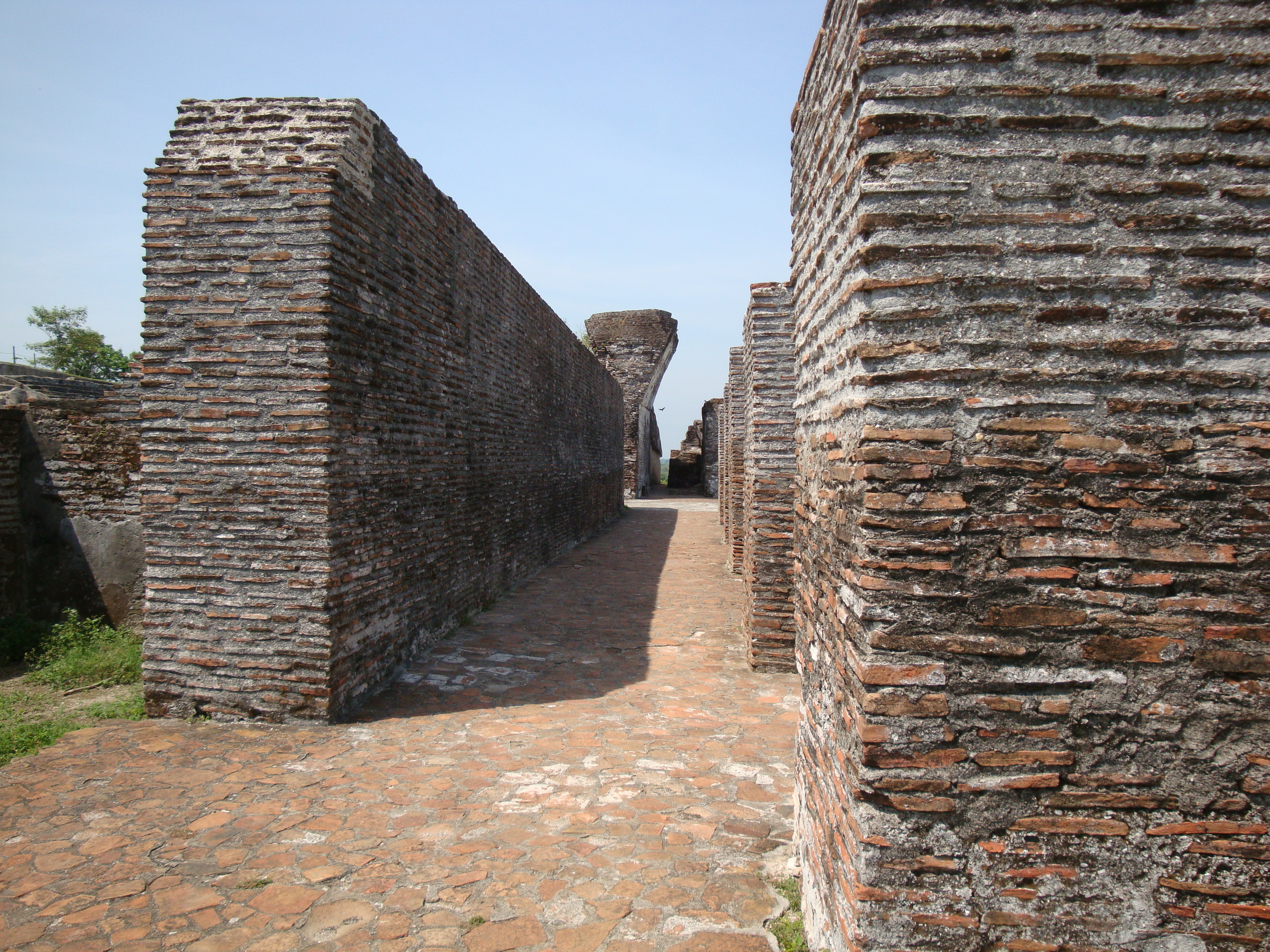
A photo of the Palace, showing the brickwork.

=== General Site Description ===
To date, 432 structures have been identified at the site, including temples, an administrative building, elite dwellings and functional buildings such as a pib'naah (sweat bath) and a popol naah (council chamber). These dot the ceremonial core of the site and cover an area of 1,000 m^{2} (11,000 sq ft) surrounded by residential complexes, which can consist of individual mounds, groups of mounds surrounding a central "plaza" or complexes of two to five plazas. These mounds are made of flattened earth and covered with stucco. Beyond these complexes, rural dwellings were built from perishable materials on mounds of flattened earth.

Three great complexes forming the ceremonial site core survive: the North Plaza, the East Acropolis and the Great Acropolis. The ceremonial center displays the key features of Maya architecture: terraces with temples, palaces, platforms and plazas. Several temples have vaulted inner chambers, which allowed them to also function as tombs.

=== North Plaza ===
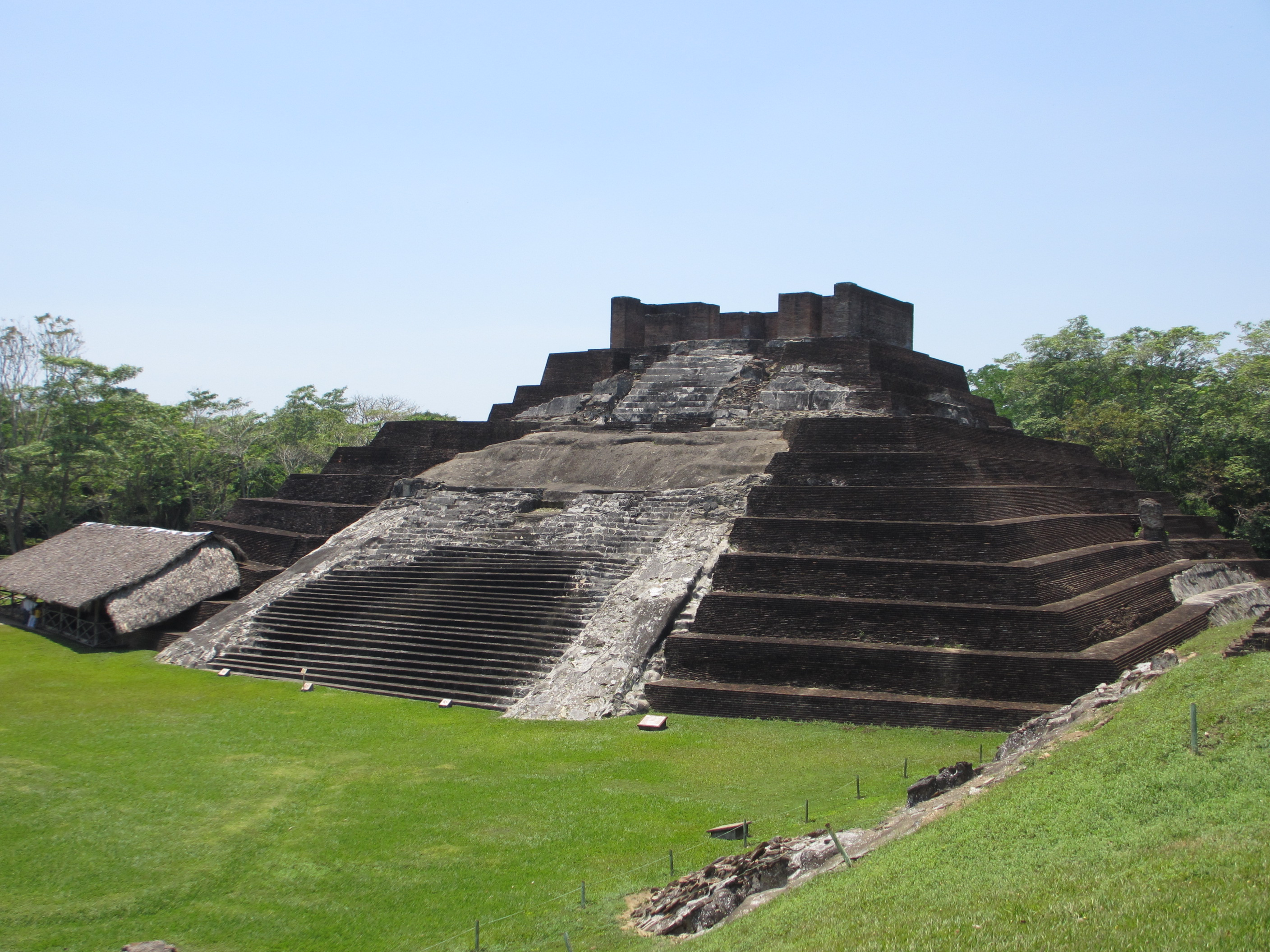
Temple I

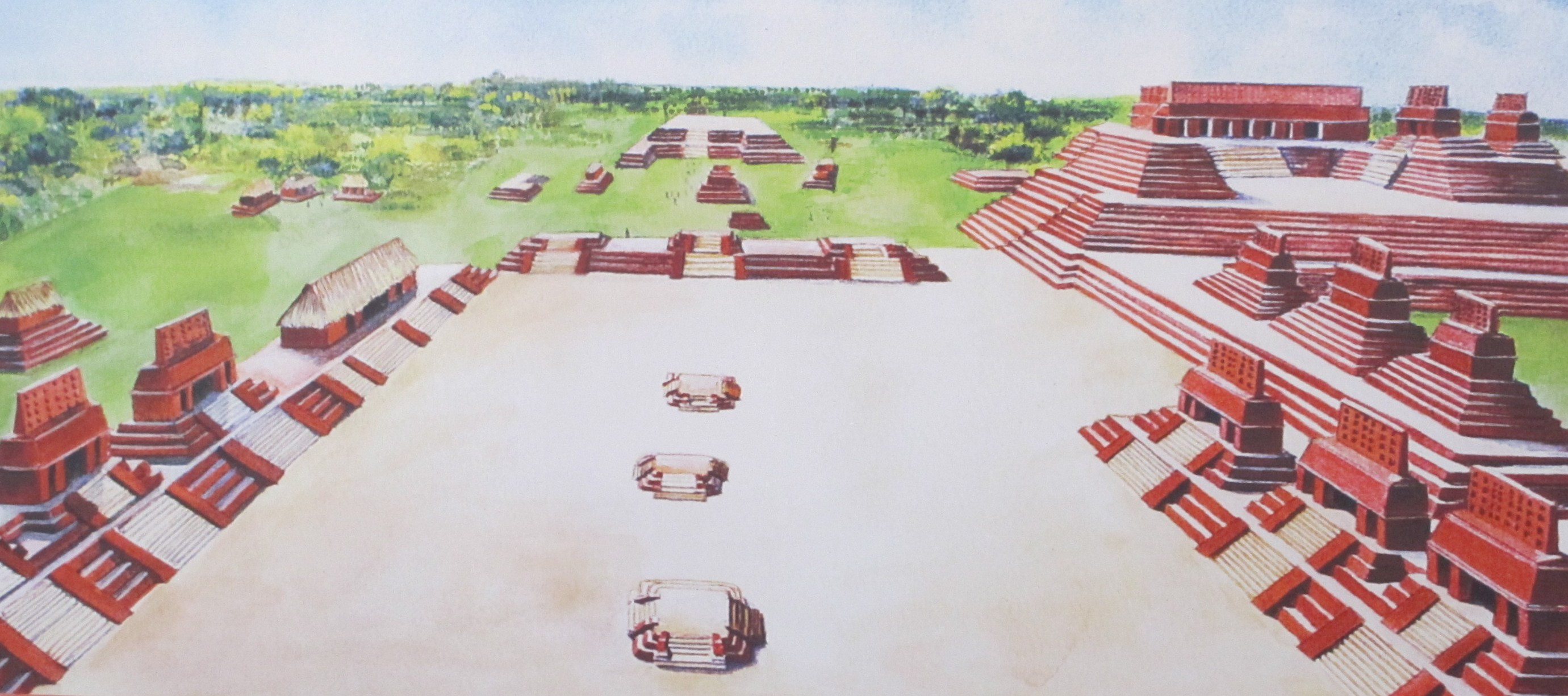
Digital recreation of the North Plaza from the top of Temple I. In the upper right shows the Great Acropolis and The Palace. In this square were made grandiose events of dedication and rituals activities with offerings of blood.

The western end of the North Plaza is Temple I, a large brick pyramid that dominates the complex. Its central stairway rises 20 m (66 ft) from the plaza floor, passing through ten tiers with slanted sides and narrow ledges. The three upper tiers were once decorated with stucco, and were built at a later stage than the lower seven. Atop the pyramid there was a structure with three openings leading to an entryway, from which a sanctuary with a built-in altar was entered.

The North Plaza itself is a rectangular enclosure aligned so that the long side runs from east to west. Along the northern and southern edges are raised terraces. Temples II, IIa and IIb sit along the northern terrace, with Temple II on the western end closest to Temple I. On the opposite side of the plaza, the southern terrace also has a temple on its western end (Temple III), followed by temples IIIa, an opening and then temple IIIb. Three small altars are placed along an east–west axis in the center of the plaza. On the eastern end are the remains of Temples IIIc and IIId. The complex has a typical Palenque layout, while the grouping is one of the features of early classical Maya architecture. Temples I, II and III have been excavated, yielding some of the complex's most important tablets inscriptions and funerary bone objects.

Temple II was reached from the plaza through a single staircase leading into a room with three entrances, and in turn an inner chamber. In 1998, the remains of a man identified as Ah Pakal Tan (alternatively spelled Aj Pakal Tahn) were discovered between Temples II and IIb in a funerary urn. Two factors lead archaeologists to speculate that he was an important religious personage: the similarity of objects in the burial with those used by modern Maya shamans, and inscriptions on burial objects found with him. These associate him with religious ceremonies rather than with the events more typical of a ruler. In total, 260 glyphs appear written on conch pendants and stingray barbs, covering 14 years of Ah Pakal Tan's life. They reference self-sacrifice and bloodletting rituals and narrate events where Ah Pakal Tan was accompanied by rain deities. Only 80 of the 260 glyphs found on the inscriptions have been translated by epigraphers.

The gap on the southern terrace, in between Temples IIIa and IIIb, opens onto the Great Acropolis.

=== Great Acropolis ===
South of the Northern Plaza is a large artificial platform measuring 35 m (115 ft) in height with diverse buildings on top. It was named the Great Acropolis by Gordon Ekholm.

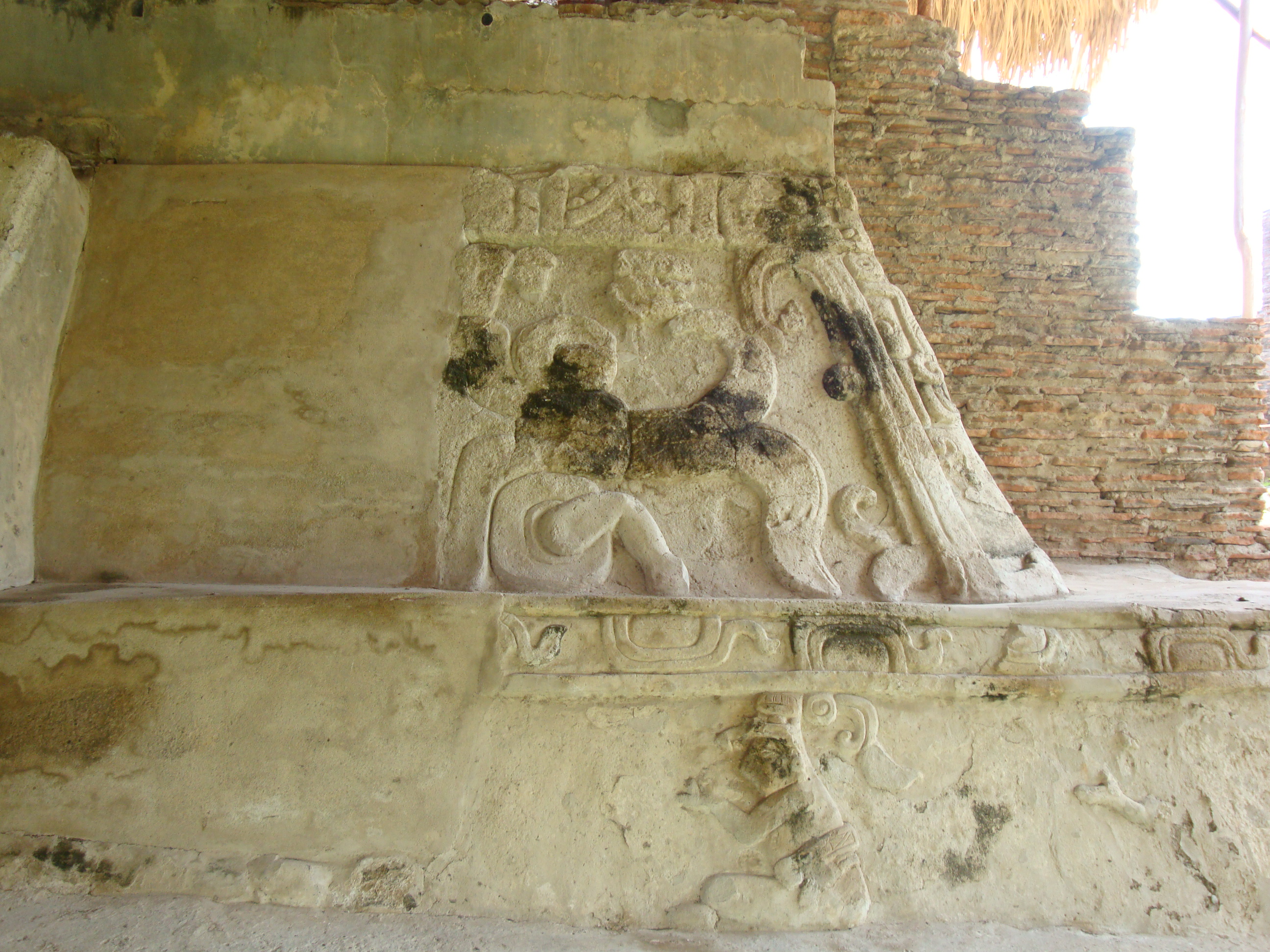
Frieze from Temple VII

Temple VII is on a protruding spur of the Great Acropolis that forms its northern edge. The temple is on a small base with a north-facing central staircase. Like many temples at the site, the structure at the summit had an entryway with three openings into a sanctuary with a constructed altar. It is also known as the Temple of the Seated Chieftains because of the seated figures modeled from stucco that can still be seen on the two upper tiers of the Temple's sloped sides.

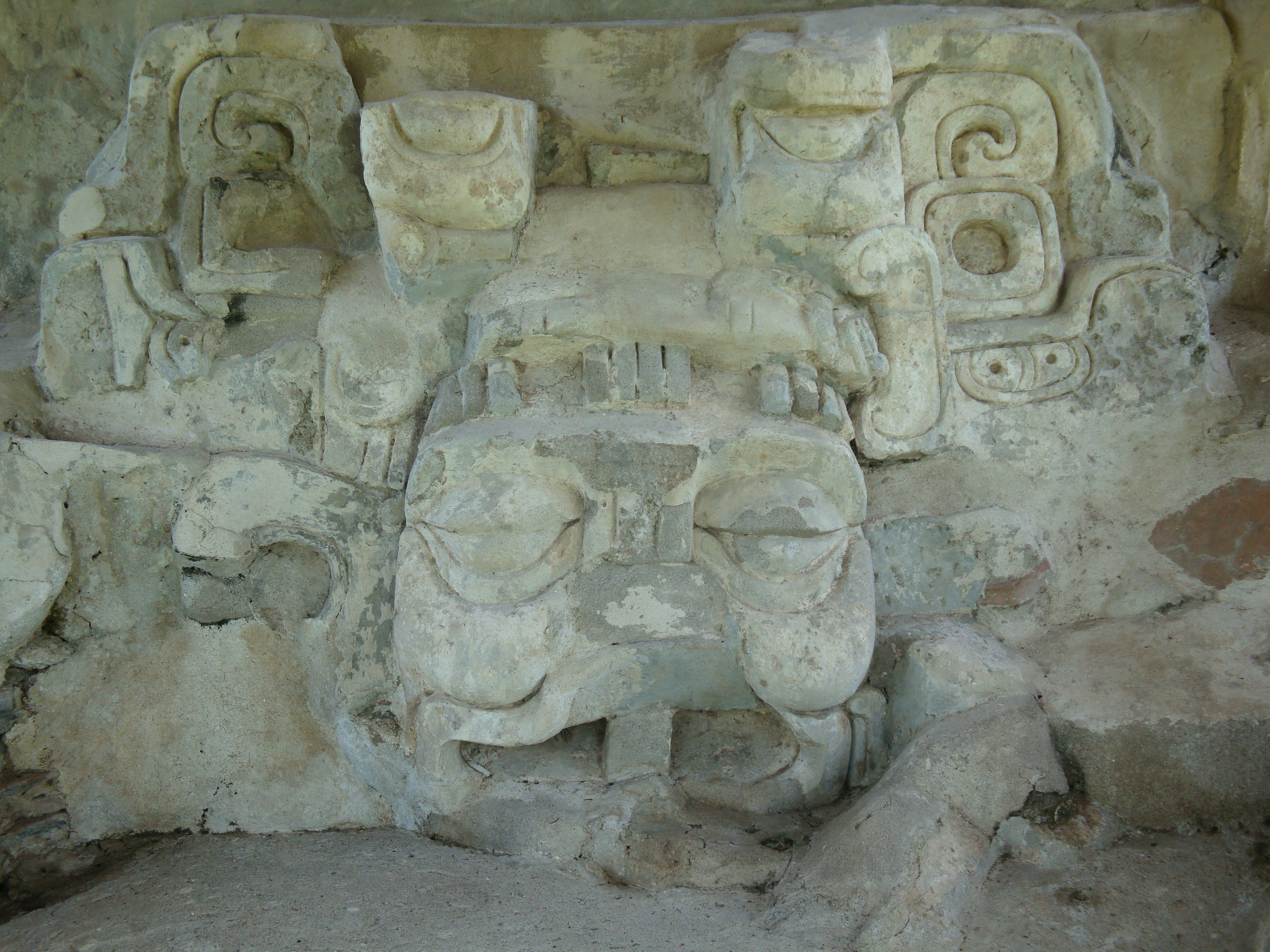
Mask of Kinich Ahau in Temple VI

On the same spur, immediately east of Temple VII and also facing north, is Temple VI, or Andrews' Temple. During the first constructive stage identified at Comalcalco, the upper structure had mud walls. Later, it was replaced by two rectangular rooms made of bricks. The upper structure is the same design as that of Temples I, V and VII. In the remains of the central stairway, archaeologist Román Piña Chán discovered a mask of the sun God Kinich Ahau in stucco. The mask is still visible to visitors and has earned the temple the nickname Temple of the Mask.

The terrace of Temples VI, VII and their ruined neighbour, Temple VIII, is on the northern edge of the Plaza of the Great Acropolis. The Palace (Structure 1) is on a larger terrace at the eastern end of the plaza and is the centrepiece of the acropolis. The Palace could once entered through eight framed doorways which led to a 2.5-metre-wide (8.2 ft) main gallery oriented on a north–south axis. The gallery connected with a long room on the north end, and other rooms on its south end. It was separated from another parallel eastern gallery by a wall with five openings. From this gallery, nine bays exited to the rear of the palace. Two of these bays had built-in benches or altars. The roof of the two galleries of the palace has collapsed, but its corbel vault is still hinted at by some standing walls, as are window-like openings. The inner spaces of the galleries show evidence of adaptation through the placement and removal of inner diving walls.

At the palace's southeast exit lies the Sunken Patio Group at the southern end of the Great Acropolis terrace. On the north side are the ruins of a residential building (Structure 2). To the east was a long building whose exposed remains seem to indicate two construction phases. The south boundary is Temple IV.

Temple IV is also known as the Stucco Tomb. In ancient times, the central staircase leading to the sanctuary covered the entrance to a vaulted funeral chamber that was once decorated with stucco figures.

Temple V is in very poor condition but shares the same features as Temple IV. It had an inner tomb and a sanctuary with two spaces. It is west of the southern end of The Palace.

West of Temple V, Temple IX was built above the Tomb of the Nine Lords of the Night. The tomb's walls were decorated with nine stucco figures, now badly eroded.

On the western side of the Great Acropolis plaza are the overgrown remains of a ballcourt.

=== East Acropolis ===
No brick buildings are immediately visible in this complex, which is a smaller version of the Great Acropolis. Like the North Plaza, it is also aligned to the cardinal directions and the main axis is very close to that of the plaza.

=== Burials ===
As in Palenque, funerary offerings contain jade beads, obsidian blades and inscribed manta ray barbs.

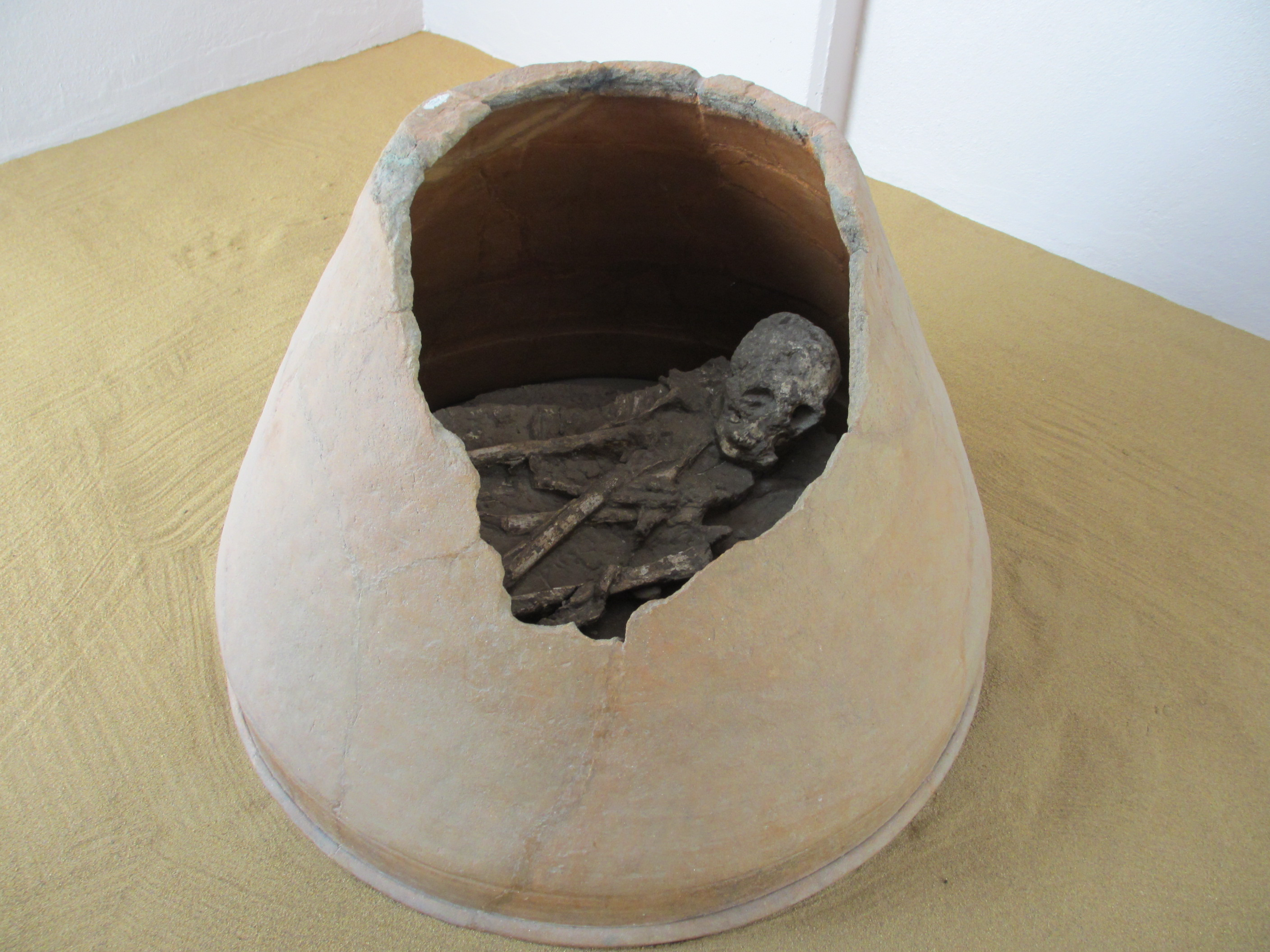
A funerary urn from Comalcalco

In late 2010, a survey of a site 2.8 km (1.7 mi) north of the Great Acropolis led to the discovery of the largest burial ground found in the region to date. Three mounds yielded 116 sets of skeletal remains, with 66 individuals found in urns showing signs of belonging to the Maya elite through features such as cranial deformation, teeth filing and tooth incrustations. Another 50 people were buried around these urns. Preliminary studies led archaeologists to conclude that the remains were approximately 1,200 years old when discovered, placing the burial to the late classic period.
