= XHID-FM =

Radio station in Álamo, Veracruz, Mexico

- Álamo, Veracruz; Mexico
- Frequency: 89.7 FM
- RDS: XHID
- Branding: Radio Kñon

Programming
- Format: Regional Mexican
- Affiliations: Grupo Radiorama

Ownership
- Owner: Radio Comunicación de Álamo, S.A. de C.V.

History
- First air date: May 24, 1978 (concession)

Technical information
- Class: B1
- ERP: 25 kW
- Transmitter coordinates: 20°54′35″N 97°40′09.34″W

Links
- Webcast: Listen live
- Website: radiokanon897.com.mx

XHID-FM is a radio station on 89.7 FM in Álamo, Veracruz. It is owned by Radio Comunicación de Álamo, S.A. de C.V., and affiliated with Grupo Radiorama. It is known as Radio Kñon and carries a Regional Mexican format.

== History ==
XEID-AM 1230, a 500-watt daytimer, received its concession on May 24, 1978. Power was later raised to 2.5 kW during the day and 1 kW at night, and eventually XEID was moved to 990 kHz with 10 kW during the day and 2.5 kW at night.

XEID was approved to migrate to FM in 2012 as XHID-FM on 89.7.
