= WVGV =

- West Union, West Virginia; United States
- Broadcast area: Doddridge, Ritchie, and Tyler counties
- Frequency: 89.7 MHz
- Branding: Gospel Voice Network

Programming
- Format: Christian radio

Ownership
- Owner: Araiza Revival Ministries, Inc.

History
- First air date: July 23, 2011; 14 years ago
- Call sign meaning: West Virginia's Gospel Voice

Technical information
- Licensing authority: FCC
- Facility ID: 174626
- Class: A
- ERP: 2,350 watts
- HAAT: 120.4 meters (395 ft)
- Transmitter coordinates: 39°17′22.0″N 80°48′16.0″W

Links
- Public license information: Public file; LMS
- Webcast: Listen live
- Website: gospelvoicenetwork.com

WVGV is a Christian radio station licensed to West Union, West Virginia, serving Doddridge, Ritchie, and Tyler counties in West Virginia. WVGV is owned and operated by Araiza Revival Ministries, Inc.

== History ==
WVGV began broadcasting July 23, 2011. In 2014, Araiza Revival Ministries bought translator W244CB 96.7 FM in West Milford, West Virginia from Educational Media Foundation for $40,000, and it began rebroadcasting WVGV. In 2022, Araiza Revival Ministries was awarded a permit for a full powered station in Glenville, West Virginia. In 2025, Araiza Revival Ministries bought W219AZ, 91.7 FM in Gallipolis, Ohio for $15,000, and it began rebroadcasting WVGV.

== Translator and relay stations ==
WVGV is also heard in the Clarksburg, West Virginia area at 96.7 FM, through translator W244CB, licensed to West Milford, West Virginia, at 91.7 the Point Pleasant, West Virginia area, through translator W219AZ, and on full power stations WVGL 91.1 FM in Glenville, West Virginia and WVGW 91.5 FM in Rock Cave, West Virginia.

Broadcast translators for WVGV
Call sign	Frequency	City of license	FID	ERP (W)	HAAT	Class	FCC info
W219AZ	91.7 FM	Gallipolis, Ohio	65993	50	60 m (197 ft)	D	LMS
W244CB	96.7 FM	West Milford, West Virginia	156251	10	159.9 m (525 ft)	D	LMS
WVGL	91.1 FM	Glenville, West Virginia	767019	6,000	8 m (26 ft)	A	LMS
WVGW	91.5 FM	Rock Cave, West Virginia	768444	8,700	82 m (269 ft)	B1	LMS
