= César Francisco Burelo =

Mexican politician

- Born: 7 November 1958 (age 67); Cunduacán, Tabasco, Mexico
- Occupation: Politician
- Political party: MORENA

César Francisco Burelo Burelo (born 7 November 1958) is a Mexican politician from the Party of the Democratic Revolution (PRD). In the 2009 mid-terms he was elected to the Chamber of Deputies to represent Tabasco's 3rd district during the 61st session of Congress.
