= Adela Graniel Campos =

Mexican politician (born 1954)

- Born: 26 December 1954 (age 71); Tabasco, Mexico
- Occupation: Politician
- Political party: PRD party

Adela del Carmen Graniel Campos (born 26 December 1954) is a Mexican politician from the Party of the Democratic Revolution (PRD). In the 2000 general election she was elected to the Chamber of Deputies to represent Tabasco's 3rd district during the 58th session of Congress.
