= PBA-FM =

Coordinates: 34°45′45″S 138°38′51″E

PBA-FM 89.7

Australia
- Broadcast area: Adelaide, South Australia
- Frequency: 89.7 MHz FM

Programming
- Format: All Musical Genres, Talk radio

Ownership
- Owner: Community Based

History
- First air date: 1983

Links
- Website: www.pbafm.org.au

PBA-FM 89.7 (call sign: 5PBA) is a community radio station in Adelaide, South Australia, and broadcasts to the Northern Suburbs.

== History ==
PBA-FM is operated by the Para Broadcasters Association Inc, which was established in 1978. Full-time broadcasting began in 1983.

The station was originally located at the Salisbury Teachers College which later became the South Australian College of Advanced Education and then the University of South Australia Salisbury campus. An early initiative in the station's history was the establishment of Foundation Studios, which gave local artists an affordable facility to have their music professionally recorded. Foundation Studios was closed in 1989.

In 2005 plans began to relocate the station after the former campus land was purchased for a housing development. With help from the Salisbury Council and the housing developers, the station relocated to Wiltshire Street in Salisbury on 4 August 2007, as part of a new community complex.

== Format ==
PBA-FM airs over 60 diverse programs each week, including several multicultural shows and non-English speaking programs. Most programs are presented by local volunteers and the station also allows community groups to broadcast programs for a small fee.

The current management encourages a culture of creative freedom, and interference with program producer's content is minimal. Announcers are free to choose the music that they present, and there are generally no restrictions on the types of music playable, unless it is likely to cause a high degree of gratuitous offence.

== Staff ==
The Association is staffed primarily by volunteers. All contribute to the station by working on a regular basis in various areas including on-air presentation, program production, administration, technical, research, library, training and promotions.

== See also ==
- List of radio stations in Australia
