= Twin Cities FM =

Community radio station in Perth, Western Australia

Coordinates: 31°45′11″S 115°46′23″E

89 7FM (Formally Twins Cities FM)
- Australia
- Broadcast area: Joondalup & Wanneroo
- Frequency: 89.7 MHz FM

Programming
- Format: Community interest / Music

History
- First air date: 2001

Technical information
- ERP: 2kW N/200W S

Links
- Website: Official website

89 7FM (call sign: 6TCR), formally known on-air as Twins Cities FM, is a community radio station, broadcasting in Perth, Western Australia. Their studios are located at the Edith Cowan University in Joondalup.

== History ==
89 7FM commenced broadcasting on 16 November 2001, it was granted a permanent community broadcasting licence in 2002. As with many community based radio stations in Australia, it plays a wide range of music, and supports Australian artists, with a big focus on WA talent. 89 7FM regularly broadcasts from local events in the Wanneroo/Joondalup region. The station is run by volunteers in the community and offers opportunities for locals to gain experience in radio broadcasting. The station offers free promotion for volunteer community groups for their services, events and notices.

89 7FM moved its operation to ECU Joondalup in May 2008.

The station has been nominated for multiple CBAA AWARDS for programs Live and Local (3-time nominees), Beats, Rhymes & Life, Lac Viet Radio, The Aurora Underground & Western.Oz.

Western.Oz won a Commendation for contributing to Local music in 2007.

89 7FM was a finalist in Excellence in Music Presenting, in 2019, for Live and Local and a finalist in Excellence in Ethic & Multicultural Broadcasting for Latin Studio and Contribution To Australian Music for Beats, Rhymes and Life. Also, in 2019, the station was a winner for Excellence in Community Engagement for School of Thought.

== Membership ==
This station, as with around 95% of Australia's community radio stations, is a member of the Community Broadcasting Association of Australia. 89 7FM is also a member of Volunteering WA, Joondalup Business Association and Wanneroo Business Association.

== See also ==
- CBAA
- ACMA
