= KLXP =

Coordinates: 35.477°N 117.700°W

- Randsburg, California; United States
- Frequency: 89.7 MHz

Programming
- Format: Christian adult contemporary
- Network: K-Love

Ownership
- Owner: Educational Media Foundation

History
- First air date: February 3, 1991
- Former call signs: KGBM (1989–2016)

Technical information
- Licensing authority: FCC
- Facility ID: 24706
- Class: B
- ERP: 6,800 watts
- HAAT: 397 meters (1,302 ft)
- Translator: 95.1 K236AW (Lancaster)

Links
- Public license information: Public file; LMS
- Website: K-Love

KLXP (89.7 FM, "K-Love") is a non-commercial radio station that is licensed to Randsburg, California and serves Ridgecrest, California City, and the Antelope Valley. The station is owned by Educational Media Foundation and broadcasts the Christian adult contemporary format of its nationally syndicated K-Love network. KLXP is simulcast on translator station K236AW (95.1 FM) in Lancaster, California.

== History ==
The station first signed on February 3, 1991 as KGBM. Originally owned by Palmdale-based Grace Broadcasting, it aired a Christian music and talk format.

In 2002, Grace Broadcasting sold KGBM to Educational Media Foundation (EMF) for an undisclosed amount. EMF then flipped the station to its Air1 network, which at the time broadcast a Christian rock format.

On July 8, 2016, the station changed its call sign to KLXP and began airing K-Love, EMF's Christian adult contemporary music network.
