= WUBS =

- South Bend, Indiana; United States
- Frequency: 89.7 MHz
- Branding: WUBS 89.7 FM

Programming
- Format: Black gospel Community radio

Ownership
- Owner: ICU Ministries, Inc.

History
- First air date: January 1, 1993
- Call sign meaning: "We Unite Brothers and Sisters"

Technical information
- Licensing authority: FCC
- Facility ID: 28881
- Class: A
- ERP: 1,500 watts
- HAAT: 24 metres (79 ft)
- Transmitter coordinates: 41°40′51.1″N 86°15′34″W

Links
- Public license information: Public file; LMS
- Webcast: Listen live
- Website: wubsradio.com

WUBS (89.7 FM) is a radio station licensed to South Bend, Indiana serving the greater Michiana region. The station is owned by ICU Ministries, Inc., and airs a community radio format targeting faith-based African American listeners.

The station was assigned the WUBS call letters by the Federal Communications Commission on December 17, 1992. The station went live on air for the first time on January 1, 1993, at its studios on Lincoln Way West in South Bend, Indiana.
