= Eastside Radio =

- Australia
- Broadcast area: Eastern Suburbs and Inner West of Sydney
- Frequency: 89.7 mHz FM

Programming
- Format: Community radio

Ownership
- Owner: Radio Eastern Sydney Co-operative Ltd

History
- First air date: 1983

Links
- Website: eastsidefm.org

Eastside Radio (callsign 2RES) is a community radio station based in Paddington, Sydney, and broadcasting to the Eastern Suburbs of Sydney and the greater Sydney area, where it can be heard as far west as the Blue Mountains. High density broadcast areas include the municipalities of Botany Bay, Randwick, Waverley, Woollahra the City of Sydney and the metropolitan Inner West. The station can also be heard around the world via online streaming.

Eastside Radio is owned and operated by the Radio Eastern Sydney Co-operative Limited, a not-for-profit organisation. It is a volunteer run organisation, augmented by a small core staff and is funded through listener subscription and donation, grants and limited commercial sponsorship.

Eastside Radio has been on the air since 1983 and on 5 February 2014 it switched from broadcasting in mono to stereo.

== Programming ==
Eastside Radio presents a range of specialist music genres, including jazz in its many styles from traditional to free jazz to swing to Latin to Bebop and fusion. Specialist music programmes cover soul, blues and funk, Cuban and Brazilian, gypsy, world music and dance.

The station also specialises in broad coverage of the arts through its weekday morning Arts programmes, which range from magazine style shows to those with more in-depth focus on the visual arts and performing arts, as well as film, literature and other inter-disciplinary fields. The afternoon Drive programmes specialise in local community news and political issues. The station also offers several programmes in languages other than English and lifestyle programmes.

Many of the Eastside presenters are Sydney-based musicians and artists, bringing specialist knowledge and personality to the programming. The station does not use playlists, instead allowing the presenters to make their own music selections.

Eastside Radio led to the establishment of The Red Room Company through Red Room Radio which started airing in 2001. The programme broadcast original poetry, writing, reviews and interviews with Australian writers. The company now creates alternative forms of poetry publication such as radio, video and new media.

== Gigs ==
Eastside radio also presents a range of gigs, concerts and events. Their signature event Eastside Live at 505 is a monthly event held at Venue 505 in Surry Hills. The night features two sets from a specialist music group as well as a DJ set from one of Eastside's resident presenters. The concert is broadcast live on the radio station and proceeds from ticket sales are used to help fund the station's continued operation.

== Events ==
Global Rhythms is Eastside's world music festival held at Watsons Bay and broadcast live on the station. The event has been held since 2010 and is due once again in 2016. Past performers have included (amongst others) Mucho Mambo, Dereb the Ambassador and The Tango Saloon as well as DJ sets by Eastside presenters.

The station also hosts a bi-yearly radiothon with varying themes, and this radiothon is their main source of income and support. During the radiothon, Eastside offers a variety of prizes for those who choose to become supporters of the station and hosts events such as a launch party.

== Awards ==
In 1999, Eastside Radio received the Tony Staley Award for its Jazz Overnight system. The system had a website listing available tracks and allowed anyone to rate them. Between midnight and 7am the system would select tracks, sampled with bias towards tracks that were highly rated, and add station IDs and promos periodically.

== See also ==
- List of radio stations in Australia
