= WTKC =

- Findlay, Ohio; United States
- Frequency: 89.7 MHz

Programming
- Format: Religious

Ownership
- Owner: Faith Educational Media, Inc.

History
- Call sign meaning: Where Thy Kingdom Come

Technical information
- Licensing authority: FCC
- Facility ID: 92793
- Class: A
- ERP: 200 watts
- HAAT: 26 meters
- Transmitter coordinates: 41°02′43″N 83°39′02″W

Links
- Public license information: Public file; LMS
- Website: Official website

WTKC (89.7 FM) is a radio station licensed to Findlay, Ohio, United States, the station serves Findlay's college area and surrounding townships. The station is currently owned by Faith Educational Media, Inc.
