= KBHN =

Radio station in Booneville–Fort Word, Arkansas

- Booneville, Arkansas; United States
- Broadcast area: Ft. Smith
- Frequency: 89.7 MHz
- Branding: 89.7 The Word

Programming
- Format: Contemporary Christian

Ownership
- Owner: Vision Ministries, Inc.

Technical information
- Licensing authority: FCC
- Facility ID: 92814
- Class: C1
- ERP: 59,000 watts
- HAAT: 92.0 meters
- Transmitter coordinates: 35°8′25″N 94°3′43″W

Links
- Public license information: Public file; LMS
- Website: www.897theword.org

KBHN (89.7 FM) is a radio station broadcasting a Contemporary Christian format. Branded as 89.7 The Word and licensed to Booneville, Arkansas, United States, it serves the Ft. Smith Radio area. The station is currently owned by Vision Ministries, Inc..
