= CFWN-FM =

Radio station in Port Hope, Ontario, Canada

Coordinates: 43°58′05″N 78°10′38″W

- Cobourg; Canada
- Broadcast area: Ontario, Canada
- Frequency: 89.7 MHz (FM)

Technical information
- Power: 700 watts

Links
- Website: www.northumberland897.ca

CFWN-FM is a community radio station broadcasting at 89.7 MHz (FM) in Port Hope, Ontario, Canada.

== History ==
On November 10, 2011, Small Town Radio (STR) received an approval from the Canadian Radio-television and Telecommunications Commission (CRTC) for a new english-language community FM radio station to serve West Northumberland at 89.7 MHz with an effective radiated power of 700 watts.
