= West Milford, West Virginia =

- Town
- Flag

- Location of West Milford in Harrison County, West Virginia.
- Coordinates: 39°12′9″N 80°24′13″W
- Country: United States
- State: West Virginia
- County: Harrison
- Chartered: 1818

Area
  - Total: 0.53 sq mi (1.38 km^{2})
  - Land: 0.53 sq mi (1.38 km^{2})
  - Water: 0 sq mi (0.00 km^{2})
- Elevation: 1,014 ft (309 m)

Population (2020)
  - Total: 449
  - Estimate (2021): 447
  - Density: 1,142.3/sq mi (441.05/km^{2})
- Time zone: UTC-5 (Eastern (EST))
  - Summer (DST): UTC-4 (EDT)
- ZIP code: 26451
- Area code: 304
- FIPS code: 54-85924
- GNIS feature ID: 1555949
- Website: local.wv.gov/westmilford/Pages/default.aspx

West Milford is a town in Harrison County, West Virginia, United States. The population was 452 at the 2020 census.

West Milford was named on account of there being a mill on the ford of the West Fork River.

== Geography ==
West Milford is located at 39°12′9″N 80°24′13″W (39.202490, -80.403719), along the West Fork River in southern Harrison County.

According to the United States Census Bureau, the town has a total area of 0.53 square miles (1.37 km^{2}), all land.

== Demographics ==
Historical population
Census	Pop.	Note	%±
1890	210		—
1900	187		−11.0%
1910	212		13.4%
1930	349		—
1940	389		11.5%
1950	401		3.1%
1960	367		−8.5%
1970	356		−3.0%
1980	510		43.3%
1990	519		1.8%
2000	651		25.4%
2010	630		−3.2%
2020	449		−28.7%
2021 (est.)	447	▼	−0.4%
U.S. Decennial Census

=== 2010 census ===
As of the census of 2010, there were 630 people, 263 households, and 180 families living in the town. The population density was 1,188.7 inhabitants per square mile (459.0/km^{2}). There were 279 housing units at an average density of 526.4 per square mile (203.2/km^{2}). The racial makeup of the town was 96.5% White, 0.2% African American, 0.2% Native American, 0.2% Asian, and 3.0% from two or more races. Hispanic or Latino of any race were 0.5% of the population.

There were 263 households, of which 34.6% had children under the age of 18 living with them, 52.5% were married couples living together, 10.3% had a female householder with no husband present, 5.7% had a male householder with no wife present, and 31.6% were non-families. 27.0% of all households were made up of individuals, and 11.8% had someone living alone who was 65 years of age or older. The average household size was 2.40 and the average family size was 2.91.

The median age in the town was 38.8 years. 25.1% of residents were under the age of 18; 5.8% were between the ages of 18 and 24; 29.7% were from 25 to 44; 26% were from 45 to 64; and 13.5% were 65 years of age or older. The gender makeup of the town was 51.6% male and 48.4% female.

=== 2000 census ===
As of the census of 2000, there were 651 people, 236 households, and 189 families living in the town. The population density was 1,223.1 inhabitants per square mile (474.2/km^{2}). There were 267 housing units at an average density of 501.7 per square mile (194.5/km^{2}). The racial makeup of the town was 99.54% White, 0.31% Native American, and 0.15% from two or more races. Hispanic or Latino of any race were 0.46% of the population.

There were 236 households, out of which 40.7% had children under the age of 18 living with them, 64.0% were married couples living together, 11.0% had a female householder with no husband present, and 19.9% were non-families. 16.5% of all households were made up of individuals, and 6.8% had someone living alone who was 65 years of age or older. The average household size was 2.76 and the average family size was 3.07.

In the town, the population was spread out, with 28.0% under the age of 18, 7.5% from 18 to 24, 32.6% from 25 to 44, 20.4% from 45 to 64, and 11.5% who were 65 years of age or older. The median age was 35 years. For every 100 females, there were 94.9 males. For every 100 females age 18 and over, there were 89.1 males.

The median income for a household in the town was $32,250, and the median income for a family was $34,583. Males had a median income of $30,000 versus $22,292 for females. The per capita income for the town was $16,527. About 6.7% of families and 10.7% of the population were below the poverty line, including 8.0% of those under age 18 and 8.5% of those age 65 or over.
