= KWJP =

- Paola, Kansas; United States
- Frequency: 89.7 MHz
- Branding: Kingdom FM

Programming
- Format: Christian radio

Ownership
- Owner: Bott Broadcasting Company; (Community Broadcasting, Inc.)

History
- Former call signs: KCPU (2008); KCPK (2008–2010)

Technical information
- Licensing authority: FCC
- Facility ID: 171650
- Class: A
- ERP: 4,500 watts
- HAAT: 68 metres (223 ft)
- Transmitter coordinates: 38°28′49″N 94°56′53″W

Links
- Public license information: Public file; LMS

KWJP (89.7 FM) is a radio station licensed to serve the community of Paola, Kansas. The station is owned by Bott Broadcasting Company, through licensee Community Broadcasting, Inc. It airs a Christian radio format. Distant and fringe coverage extends into southern Olathe, Overland Park, and the Southern portion of Johnson County Kansas.

The station was assigned the KCPU call sign by the Federal Communications Commission on March 21, 2008. The station changed its call sign to KCPK on May 7, 2008, and to KWJP on January 20, 2010
