= WNUX =

- Montgomery, West Virginia; United States
- Broadcast area: Beckley, West Virginia; Oak Hill, West Virginia
- Frequency: 89.7 MHz
- Branding: St. Paul Radio

Programming
- Format: Catholic Religious
- Affiliations: EWTN Radio

Ownership
- Owner: St. Paul Radio Co.

History
- First air date: September 17, 2012

Technical information
- Licensing authority: FCC
- Facility ID: 171273
- Class: B
- ERP: 3,300 watts
- HAAT: 416.6 meters (1,367 ft)
- Transmitter coordinates: 37°56′50.60″N 81°18′28.60″W

Links
- Public license information: Public file; LMS

WNUX is a Catholic Religious formatted broadcast radio station licensed to Montgomery, West Virginia, serving the Beckley/Oak Hill area. WNUX is owned and operated by St. Paul Radio Co.
