= XHAWD-FM =

Radio station in San Luis Potosí, San Luis Potosí, Mexico

- San Luis Potosí, San Luis Potosí; Mexico
- Frequency: 101.3 MHz
- Branding: Magnética FM

Ownership
- Owner: Grupo AWD; (Fundación Nikola Tesla, A.C.)

History
- First air date: March 12, 2005
- Former frequencies: 107.1 MHz (2005–2022)
- Call sign meaning: Grupo AWD

Technical information
- Licensing authority: CRT
- Class: AA
- ERP: 5,000 watts
- HAAT: −44.27 m (−145.2 ft)
- Transmitter coordinates: 22.133778°N 101.027572°W

Links
- Webcast: Listen live
- Website: magneticafm.com

XHAWD-FM is a radio station located in the city of San Luis Potosí, San Luis Potosí, Mexico. Owned by the Fundación Nikola Tesla, A.C., a business of San Luis Potosí-based Grupo AWD, XHAWD-FM broadcasts on 101.3 FM and is known as Magnética FM.

== History ==
XHAWD came to air on March 12, 2005, and is one of several ventures of Grupo AWD, a scientific company that also produces audio processors and cathodic protection systems.

The station is to move to 101.3 MHz on May 14, 2022, in order to clear 106–108 MHz for community and indigenous radio stations.
