= WPAE =

Christian radio station in Centreville, Mississippi

Coordinates: 31°05′16″N 91°03′09″W

- Centreville, Mississippi; United States
- Broadcast area: Baton Rouge, Louisiana; Natchez, Mississippi
- Frequency: 89.7 MHz
- Branding: Sound Radio

Programming
- Format: Christian radio

Ownership
- Owner: Port Allen Educational Broadcasting Foundation
- Sister stations: KPAE

Technical information
- Licensing authority: FCC
- Facility ID: 53026
- Class: C1
- ERP: 84,000 watts
- HAAT: 149 meters (489 ft)

Links
- Public license information: Public file; LMS
- Website: soundradio.org

WPAE is a Christian radio station licensed to Centreville, Mississippi, broadcasting on 89.7 FM. WPAE serves the areas of Baton Rouge, Louisiana and Natchez, Mississippi, and is owned by Port Allen Educational Broadcasting Foundation.

WPAE airs a variety of Christian Talk and Teaching programs as well as southern gospel music. Programs heard on WPAE include; Grace to You with John MacArthur, Revive our Hearts with Nancy Leigh DeMoss, The Alternative with Tony Evans, In Touch with Charles Stanley, Insight for Living with Chuck Swindoll, and Joni and Friends.
