= KSGN =

Radio station in Riverside, California

Coordinates: 34.197°N 117.287°W

- Riverside, California; United States
- Broadcast area: San Bernardino–Inland Empire
- Frequency: 89.7 MHz
- Branding: 89.7 KSGN

Programming
- Format: Christian adult contemporary

Ownership
- Owner: Good News Radio

History
- First air date: May 11, 1959
- Former call signs: KNFP (1958–19??); KSDA (19??–19??); KLLU (19??–1979)
- Call sign meaning: Keep Sharing Good News

Technical information
- Licensing authority: FCC
- Facility ID: 35600
- Class: A
- ERP: 2,750 watts
- HAAT: 98 meters (322 ft)
- Translator: see below

Links
- Public license information: Public file; LMS
- Webcast: Listen Live
- Website: ksgn.com

KSGN (89.7 FM) is a non-commercial radio station licensed to Riverside, California, United States, and serving the Riverside-San Bernardino area of the Inland Empire. Owned by Good News Radio, a religious nonprofit organization, the station airs a Christian adult contemporary format, with studios and offices on Orange Tree Lane in Redlands. KSGN's transmitter is sited on Cloudland Truck Trail in San Bernardino. It is also heard on two FM translators in Banning and Palm Springs.

== History ==
The station signed on the air as KNFP at 7:26 PM May 11, 1959, according to the La Sierra College Criterion Vol 30 #22. It was launched by professors and students at La Sierra College (now La Sierra University) in Arlington, CA before the neighborhood was annexed into Riverside, CA. The station has changed its call letters several times over the years. Other call signs included KLSC, KSDA, and KLLU.

It has always been a Christian radio station. Its business office and studios were located on the campus of Loma Linda University from 1959 until mid-2005 when KSGN relocated its business office and studios to Redlands, CA.

== Translators ==
In addition to the main station, KSGN is relayed by an additional two translators to widen its broadcast area.

Call sign	Frequency	City of license	FID	ERP (W)	Class	FCC info
K204GG	88.7 FM	Banning, California	35599	9	D	LMS
K209AK	89.7 FM	Palm Springs, California	35601	9	D	LMS
