= KTDB =

Coordinates: 34.966°N 108.426°W

Ramah, New Mexico; United States
- Frequency: 89.7 (MHz)

Programming
- Format: Public radio
- Affiliations: National Public Radio

Ownership
- Owner: Ramah Navajo School Board, Inc.

Technical information
- Licensing authority: FCC
- Facility ID: 55010
- Class: C3
- ERP: 15,000 watts
- HAAT: 88 meters (289 ft)

Links
- Public license information: Public file; LMS
- Website: KTDB website

KTDB (89.7 FM), is a National Public Radio-affiliated station in Ramah, New Mexico. It is one of the first Native American owned and operated radio stations founded in 1972, one year after KYUK-AM in Bethel, AK. It primarily features National Public Radio programming and Native American programming.

The general manager is Barbara Maria, program director is Irene Beaver, chief engineer is Bernard Bustos, technical director is Timothy Sarver, and the producers are Earl Eriacho, Walter Jose, and Olsen Pino. The radio station is located in Pine Hill, NM on the Ramah Navajo Nation. The Ramah Navajo reservation covers 146,953 acres (594.70 km^{2}) at 7,000 feet (2,100 m) above sea level. The Ramah Community population is approximately 3,000 Navajo members. The radio tower is located on Flat Top mountain.

Ramah Navajo, according to oral and written histories have lived in this area for hundreds of years. Traditional values have been blended with innovative progress while emphasizing the distinct cultural identity if the Tlochini Dine'e (People of the Wild Onion), known to the outside world as the Ramah Navajo People. Ramah Navajos have always lived in this area long before the Long Walk.
