= WRRJ =

- Cocoa Beach, Florida; United States
- Frequency: 89.7 MHz
- Branding: WRRJ 89.7FM

Programming
- Format: Reggae/Island music

Ownership
- Owner: Black Media Works, Inc.

Technical information
- Licensing authority: FCC
- Facility ID: 93959
- Class: A
- ERP: 175 watts
- HAAT: 66 metres (217 ft)
- Transmitter coordinates: 28°22′54″N 80°36′31″W
- Translator: 101.5 W268CB (Melbourne)

Links
- Public license information: Public file; LMS
- Webcast: Listen Live
- Website: Official Website

WRRJ (89.7 FM) is a radio station licensed to serve the community of Cocoa Beach, Florida. The station is owned by Black Media Works, Inc., and airs a reggae/island music format.

The station was assigned the WRRJ call letters by the Federal Communications Commission on June 4, 2015.
