= WRHO =

Non-commercial radio station in Oneonta, New York

- Oneonta, New York; United States
- Frequency: 89.7 MHz

Programming
- Format: Album-oriented rock

Ownership
- Owner: Hartwick College

History
- First air date: January 1, 1970
- Call sign meaning: Warrior Radio Hartwick Oneonta

Technical information
- Licensing authority: FCC
- Facility ID: 26330
- Class: A
- ERP: 270 watts
- HAAT: -4 meters
- Transmitter coordinates: 42°27′24.00″N 75°4′28.00″W

Links
- Public license information: Public file; LMS
- Webcast: Listen Live
- Website: wrhofm.com

WRHO (89.7 FM) is a low-power radio station broadcasting an album-oriented rock format. Licensed to Oneonta, New York, United States, the station is owned by Hartwick College.

WRHO is a small, noncommercial educational broadcast facility on the Hartwick College campus in Oneonta, NY. At 270 watts, WRHO broadcasts 24 hours per day, 365 days a year at 89.7 FM. The studios are located inside the Dewar Union Hall Communication Suite on Hartwick's campus and broadcasts to a listening audience within a 12-mile radius via a 270-watt transmitter.

WRHO has been on the air for over four decades, playing music not otherwise heard on other area stations. WRHO also connects with the Oneonta community at large by stating public service announcements of upcoming events, by hosting bands, and by offering services to other clubs and organizations on campus. Every year during Spring Weekend WRHO broadcasts live for 72 hours from a tent on Frisbee Field on the Hartwick campus.

On WRHO, all types of music can be found. Jazz to Heavy Metal, Folk and Country to Reggae, Classic Rock and Oldies to Hip Hop. WRHO receives numerous demo tapes and pre-releases from both big-time national groups and local bands before any commercial stations, which are played often.
