= CKOA-FM =

Radio station in Glace Bay, Nova Scotia

Coordinates: 46°11′59″N 59°58′43″W

- Glace Bay, Nova Scotia; Canada
- Frequency: 89.7 MHz
- Branding: The Coast 89.7

Programming
- Format: community radio/adult contemporary

Ownership
- Owner: Coastal Community Radio Cooperative Limited

History
- First air date: December 3, 2007
- Call sign meaning: "Coast"

Technical information
- Class: A
- ERP: 4.7 kW average 6 kWs peak
- HAAT: 48.5 metres (159 ft)

Links
- Website: The Coast 89.7

CKOA-FM is a Canadian radio station, broadcasting at 89.7 FM in Glace Bay, Nova Scotia. Owned and operated by the Coastal Community Radio Cooperative, the station broadcasts a community radio format branded as The Coast 89.7.

The station was licensed by the CRTC in 2007, and went on the air on December 3 of that year.

The Coastal Community Radio Cooperative began life as a low-powered 50-watt special events station, broadcasting from various locations and temporary studios in Glace Bay and Sydney, Nova Scotia.
