= Comalcalco =

City in the Mexican state of Tabasco

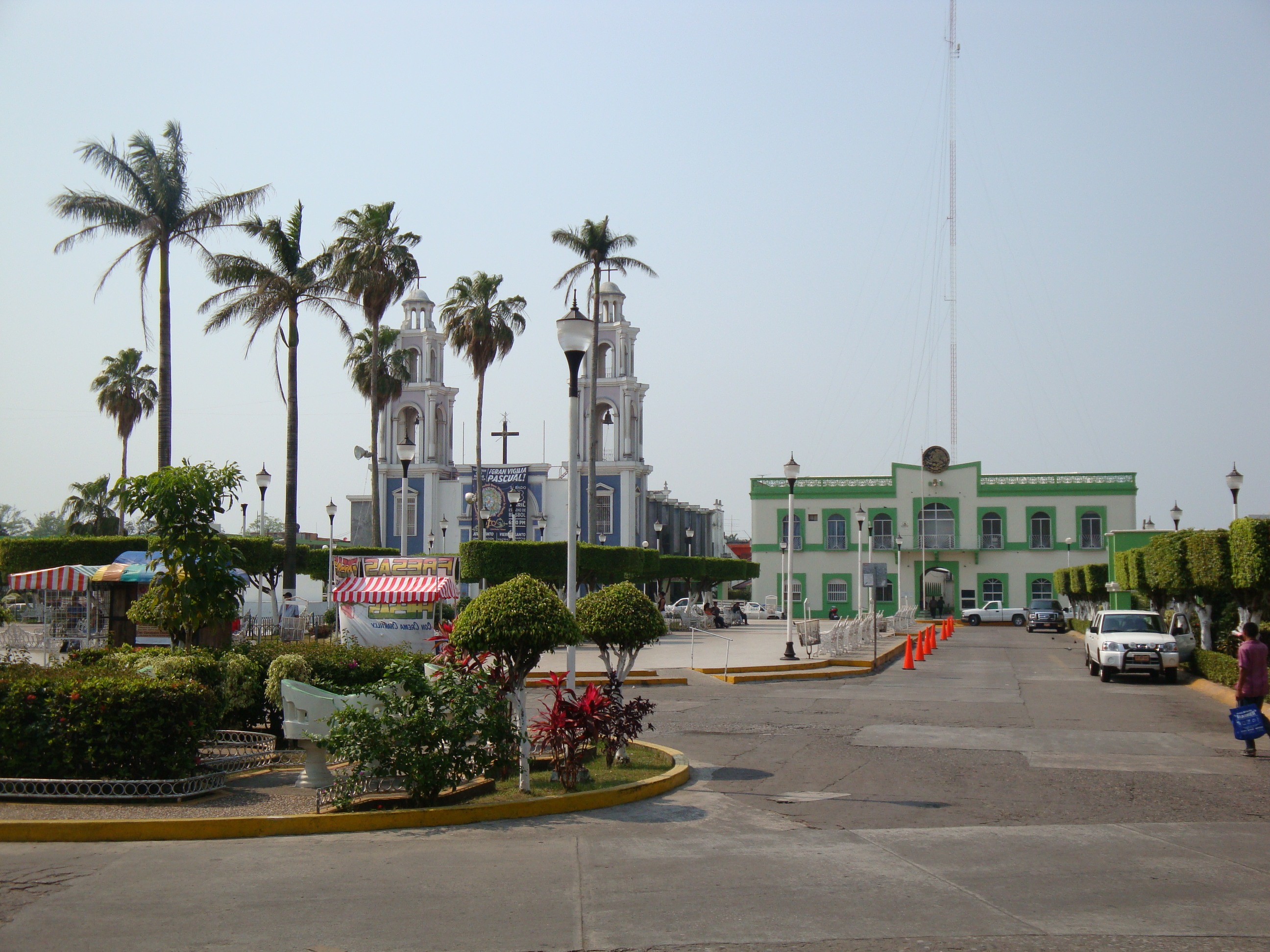
Church and Municipal Palace in the city of Comalcalco, Tabasco

Comalcalco is a city located in Comalcalco Municipality about 45 miles (60 km) northwest of Villahermosa in the Mexican state of Tabasco. The city is near the Pre-Columbian Maya archaeological site of Comalcalco. The literal English translation of "Comalcalco" is "in the house of the comals". A comal is a pan used to prepare food.

== Demography ==
In a 2020 census, the present-day city of Comalcalco reported a population of 43,035 inhabitants, while the municipality for which it serves as municipal seat had a population of 215 687. The city is the third most populous community in the state of Tabasco, behind Villahermosa and Cárdenas. The municipality, which has an area of 723.19 km^{2} (279.225 sq mi), includes many smaller outlying communities, the largest of which are Tecolutilla, Chichicapa, Cupilco, Villa Aldama, Gobernadores, Tomas Garrido and Miguel Hidalgo.

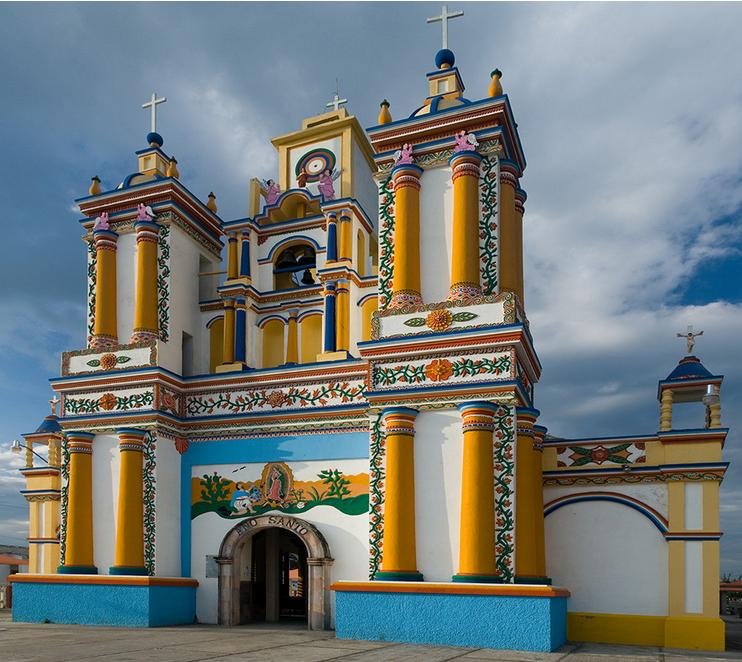
Church in Cupilco, Comalcalco.

== Archeological site ==
The site of Comalcalco, whose coordinates are 18°16′N 93°10′W, is notable for two characteristics. First, it is the westernmost known Maya settlement. Second, due to a dearth of locally available limestone (the primary material used in architectural construction), the city's buildings were made from fired-clay bricks held together with mortar made from oyster shells. The use of bricks at Comalcalco was unique among Maya sites, and many of them are decorated with iconography and/or glyphs. Important architectural features include the northern plaza and two pyramids, the Gran Acropolis and the Acropolis Este.

== Economy ==
Comalcalco has fertile soil. Large amounts of tropical products are grown. Corn, beans and vegetables are also cultivated. Cocoa is the largest harvest in Comalcalco - Comalcalco produces 20% of the cocoa harvested in the state of Tabasco. Coconut, pepper, avocado and some tropical fruits are also farmed in some zones. Livestock raising, although it is not widely practiced, is of high quality, and most ranchers have their farms just outside of Comalcalco, away from urban development.

Comalcalco produces 5% of the total extracted petroleum in the state of Tabasco.

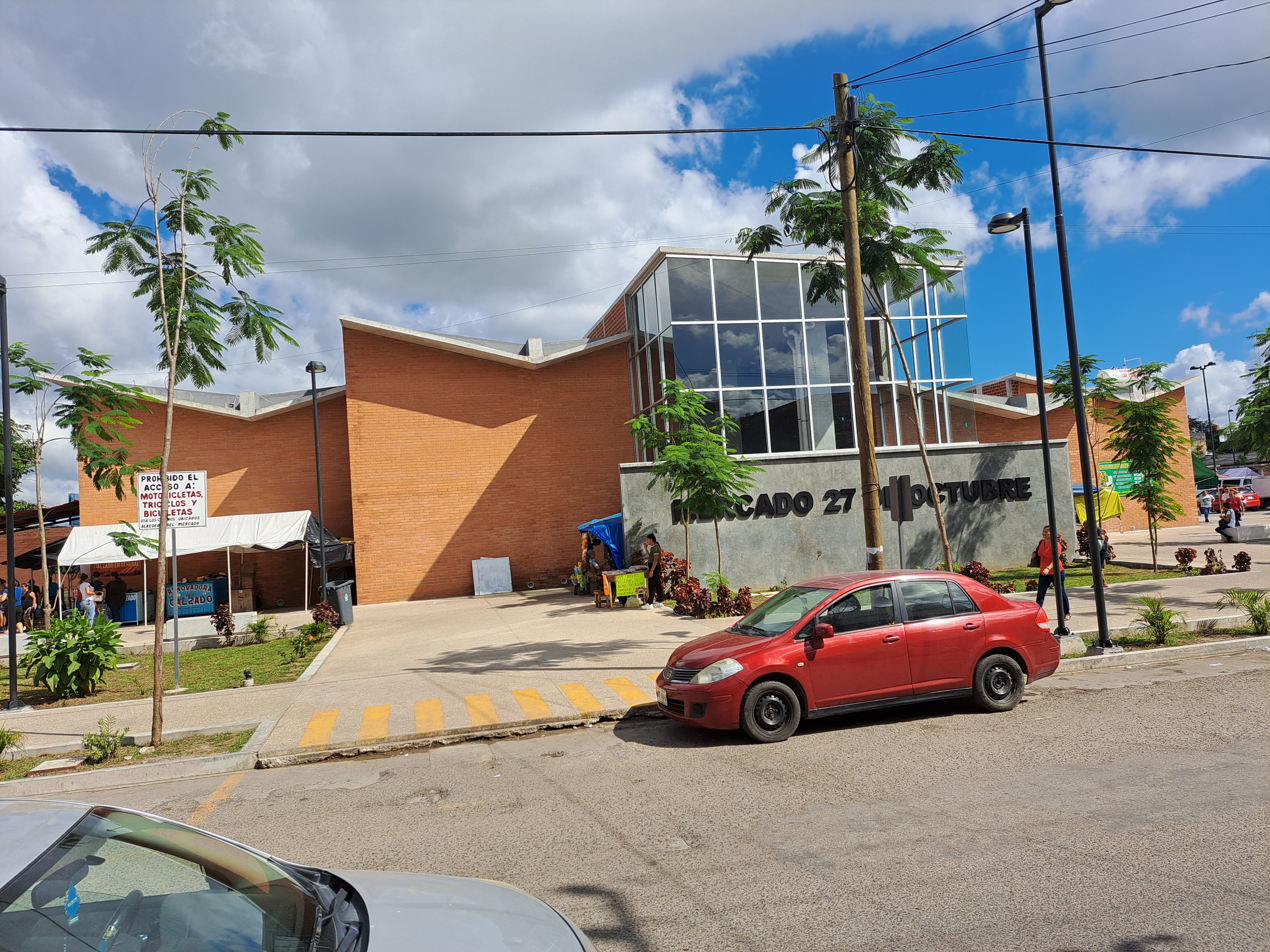
Public market in the center of Comalcalco.

== History ==
In 1820, the river Mezcalapa was drying up, and many of families resided in the middle of the river on an island. The Government of the State of Tabasco; consisting of Juan Mariano Sale, Antonio Solana and Fausto Gordillo, and all members of the congress; established a town in October and named it San Isidro de Comalcalco. The decree was published by Mr. Marcelino Margalli, governor of the state, and Jose Mariano Troncoso, secretary of the state. The town is located in the Comalcalco municipality, and on November 14, 1834, the first local government was created.
