= List of people from Boston =

This is a list of people who were born in, residents of, or otherwise closely associated with the city of Boston, Massachusetts and its surrounding metropolitan statistical area.

== 0-9 ==
- 7L & Esoteric – rap group

== A ==
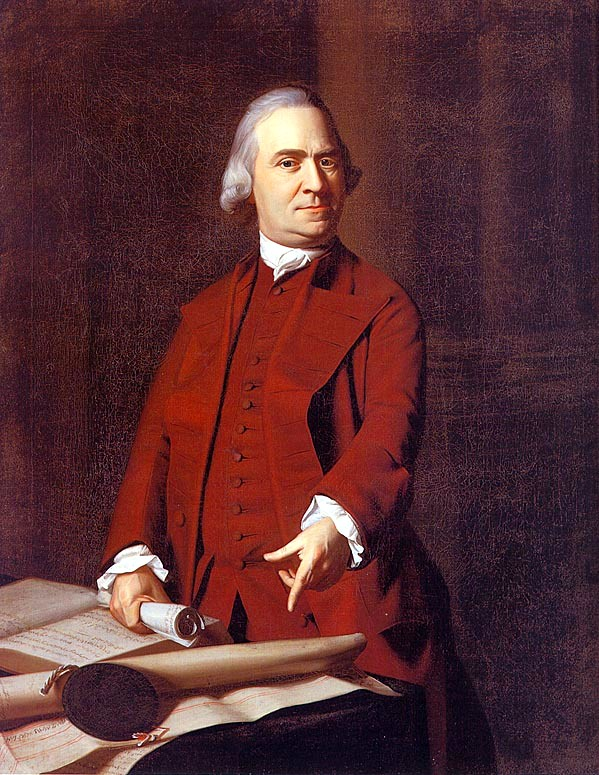
Samuel Adams

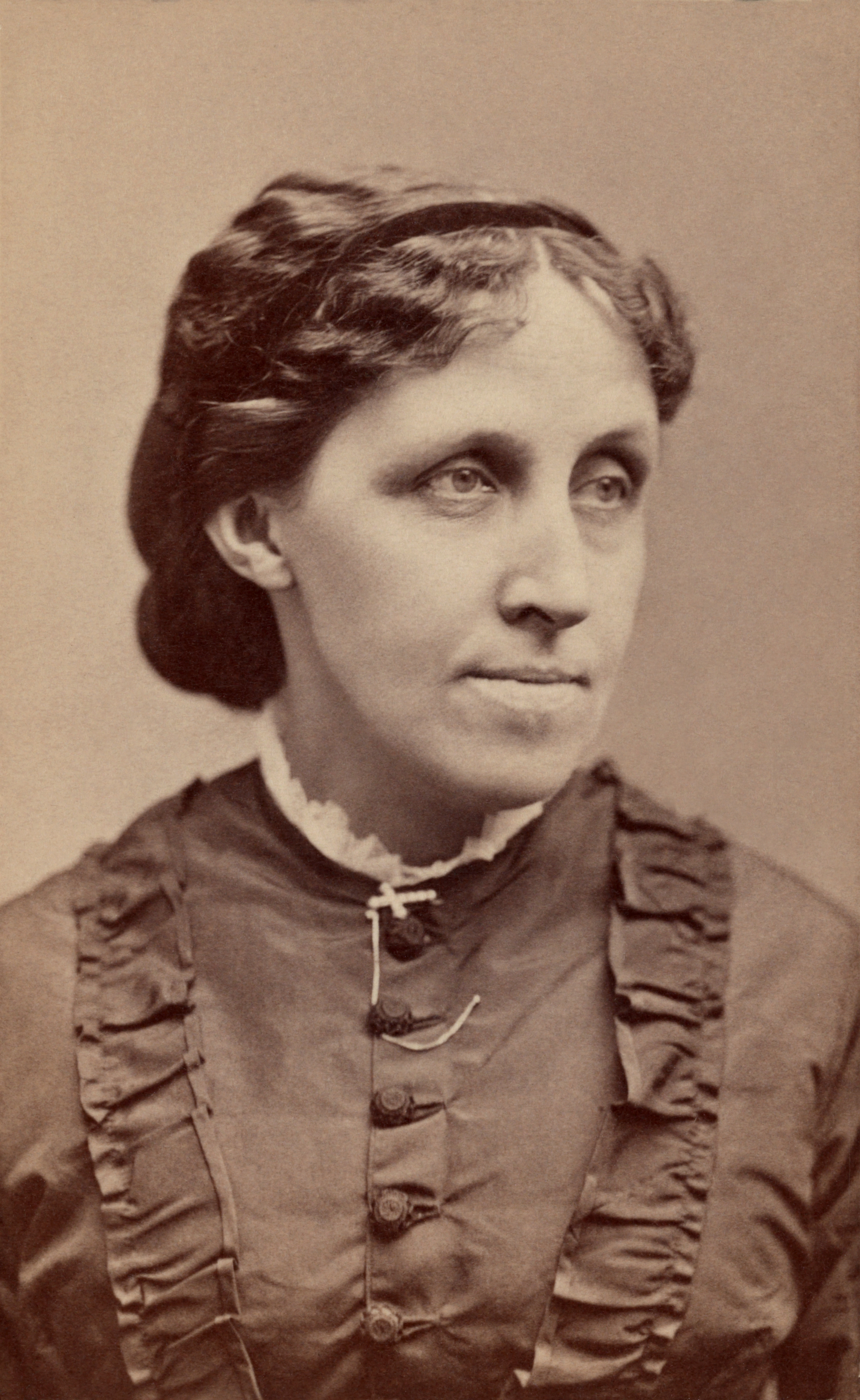
Louisa May Alcott

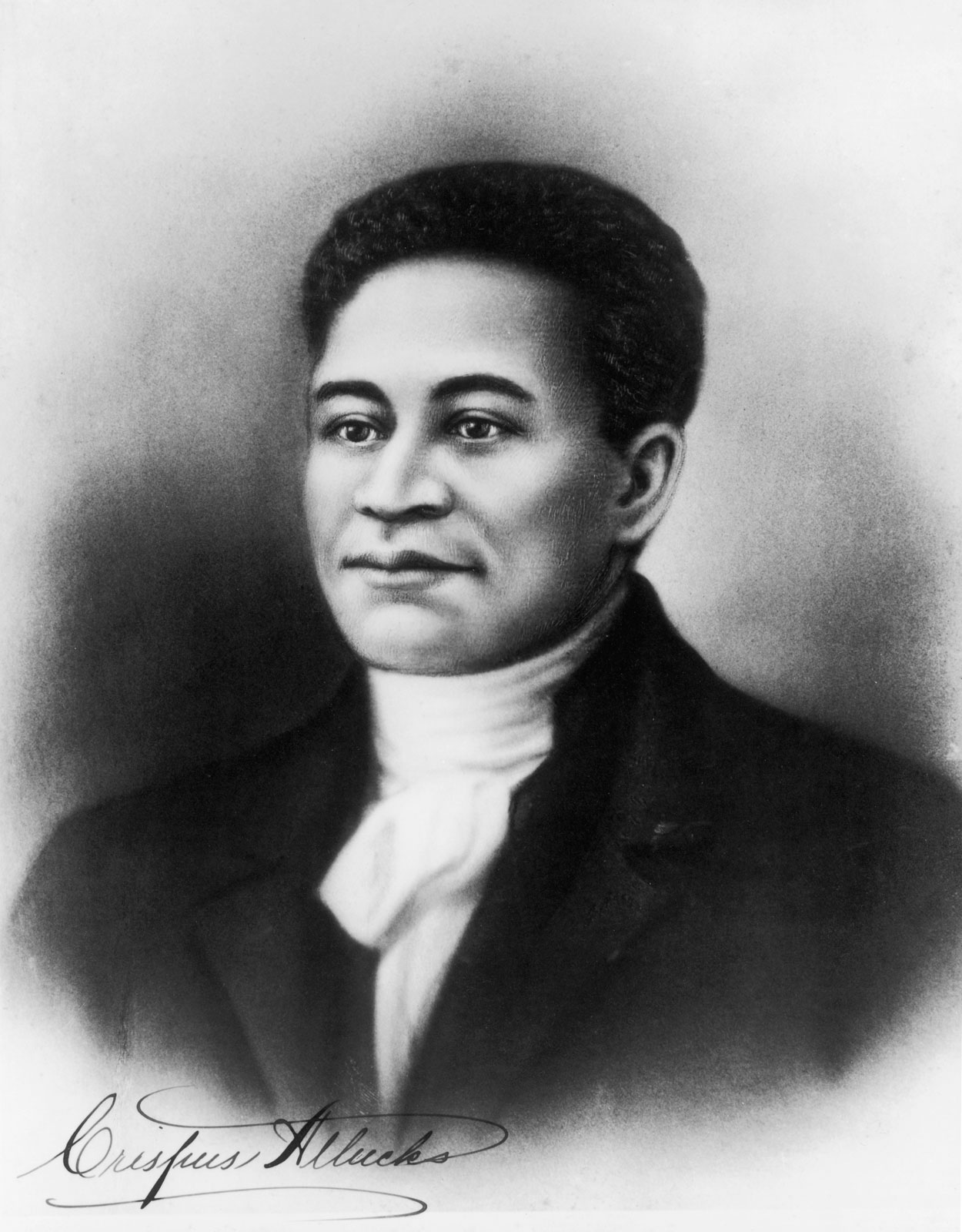
Crispus Attucks

- Joel Abbot (1776–1826) – naval officer
- Amos Abbott (1786–1868) – born in Westford, member of the United States House of Representatives from Massachusetts
- Austin Abbott (1831–1896) – born in Boston; lawyer, novelist, and academic
- Benjamin Vaughan Abbott (1830–1890) – born in Boston, lawyer and legal writer
- Joseph Carter Abbott (1825–1882) – publisher of the Boston Bee
- Josiah Gardner Abbott (1814–1891) – member of United States House of Representatives
- Abdul-Malik Abu (born 1995) – basketball player in the Israeli Premier Basketball League
- Edith Achilles (1892–1989) – psychologist
- Abigail Adams (1744–1818) – born in Weymouth, First Lady of the United States
- Abijah Adams (1754–1816) – born in Boston, journalist, often embroiled in lawsuits against him
- Charles Francis Adams Sr. (1807–1886) – born in Boston; son of Abigail Adams and John Adams; congressman; diplomat; writer
- Edwin Adams (1834–1877) – born in Medford, 19th-century stage actor
- Eliphalet Adams (1677–1753) – born in Medford, clergyman and missionary
- Hannah Adams (1755–1831) – born in Medfield, famous Christian writer
- Henry Adams (1838–1918) – born in Boston, journalist, historian, academic and novelist
- Jasper Adams (1793–1841) – born in Medway, clergyman and college president
- Nehemiah Adams (1806–1878) – clergyman and author
- Sammy Adams – musician
- Samuel Adams – American Revolution patriot, signer of the Declaration of Independence
- Aerosmith – band
- Ben Affleck – Academy Award-winning actor, screenwriter and director, brother of Casey
- Casey Affleck – Academy Award-winning actor, brother of Ben
- George Aiken (1830–1876) – born in Boston, actor and playwright
- Amos T. Akerman (1821–1880) – United States attorney general, born in Portsmouth, New Hampshire
- Akrobatik – hip hop artist, member of The Perceptionists
- Al B. Sure – singer
- Harriet Ryan Albee (1829–1873) – born and died in Boston; social reformer and philanthropist
- Mildred Albert (1905–1991) – fashion show producer and radio and television personality
- Louisa May Alcott – 19th-century author of Little Women
- Horatio Alger Jr. – author
- Fred Allen – radio comedian
- Frederick Lewis Allen – writer
- Joseph Allen (1749–1827) – born in Boston, United States congressman
- Nathaniel M. Allen – soldier in Civil War, awarded Congressional Medal of Honor
- The Almighty RSO – rap group
- Stanley Alves – soccer player
- John Amaechi – basketball player
- American Hi-Fi – band
- American Nightmare – hardcore band
- Amerie – R&B artist
- Ed Ames – actor and singer
- Rich Amiri – rapper
- Tony Amonte – NHL player
- Leroy Anderson – composer for Boston Pops Orchestra
- Arthur L. Andrews – chief master sergeant of the Air Force
- Mary Antin – author
- Ashkanov Apollon – soccer player
- Apollo Sunshine – band
- Thomas Gold Appleton (1812–1884) – writer
- Isabel Atkin – British–American skier and Olympic medalist for Great Britain
- Oliver F. Atkins – photographer, served as the chief official White House photographer
- Crispus Attucks – American Revolution patriot
- Red Auerbach – Boston Celtics coach and president, Basketball Hall of Famer
- John Augustus (1785–1859) – born in Boston, philanthropist and pioneer of probation
- James Trecothick Austin (1784–1870) – born in Boston, member of Massachusetts General Court and Massachusetts attorney general
- Jonathan Loring Austin (1748–1826) – born in Boston; officer in American Revolutionary War; Massachusetts state representative, senator, secretary, and treasurer

== B ==
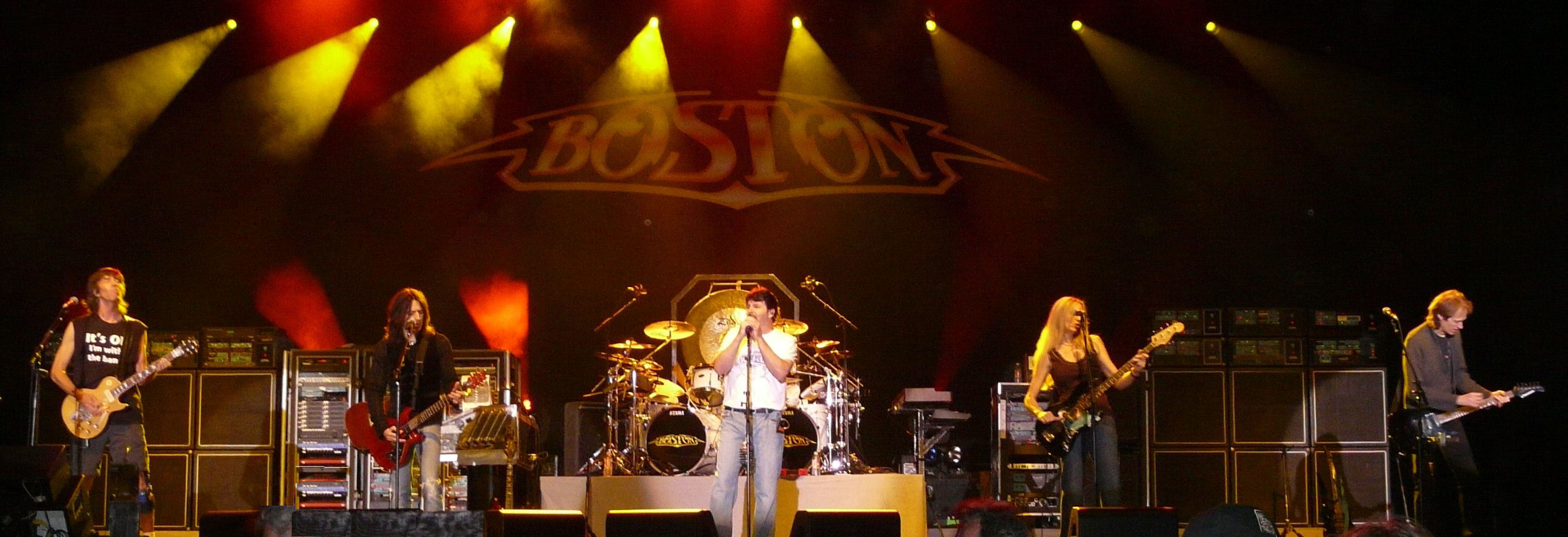
Boston

- Bad Rabbits – band
- Arthur Baker – rap DJ, music producer
- Bang Camaro – rock band
- Sasha Banks – WWE wrestler, former WWE Raw Women's Champion, former NXT Women's Champion
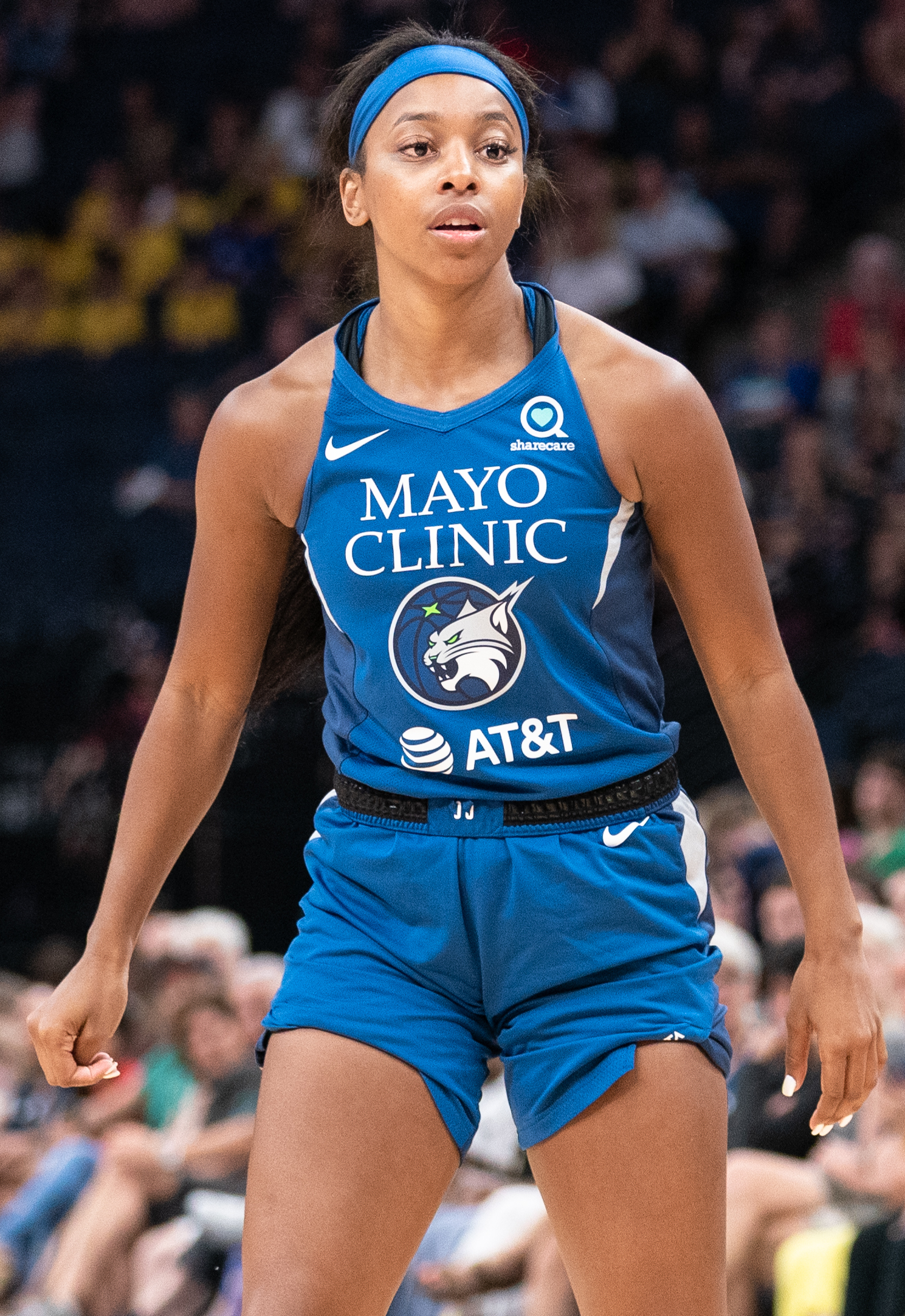
- Lexie Brown
  Maria Barrett – US Army major general; older sister of US Army General Paula Lodi
- Dana Barros – former basketball player
- Zered Bassett – professional skateboarder
- Benjamin E. Bates – founder and namesake of Bates College
- Ruth Batson – civil rights and education activist
- Susan Batson – actress, author, and producer; daughter of Ruth Batson
- Peter D. Bear – Wisconsin State Senator
- Bell Biv DeVoe – music group
- Gaston Bell – stage and silent film actor
- Tobin Bell – actor (born in Queens, NY, raised in Weymouth)
- Mark Bellhorn – MLB player
- Cora Agnes Benneson – attorney, lecturer, and writer
- Frank Weston Benson – impressionist artist
- Rick Berlin – musician
- Leonard Bernstein – New York Philharmonic conductor, composer and pianist
- Big D and the Kids Table – band
- Big Shug – rapper
- Traci Bingham – actress, model
- Mike Birbiglia – comedian
- Molly Birnbaum – writer
- William Blackstone (also spelled Blaxton) – first European settler
- Arthur Blake – athlete
- Will Blalock – former basketball player
- David Blatt (born 1959) – Israeli-American basketball player and coach (most recently for the Cleveland Cavaliers)
- C. L. Blood – physician
- Matt Bloom – NFL player and professional wrestler, known for his time in WWE
- Michael Bloomberg – former mayor of New York City
- Bob and Ray – comedy team
- Ernie Boch Jr. – president of Boch Enterprises
- Ray Bolger – actor and dancer, Scarecrow in The Wizard of Oz
- Veda Ann Borg – film actress
- Boston – band
- Boys Like Girls – band
- Ron Brace – NFL player, New England Patriots
- Nathaniel Jeremiah Bradlee – architect
- William J. Bratton – chief of police for NYPD and LAPD
- Connie Britton – actress
- John Britton – abortion provider
- Edward W. Brooke – first African American elected by popular vote to United States Senate
- Ames T. Brown – Adjutant General of New York
- Bobby Brown – singer
- Carolyn Brown – dancer, writer, choreographer
- Earle Brown – composer
- Lexie Brown – basketball player for the Seattle Storm
- Sam Brown – comedian from IFC sketch comedy show The Whitest Kids U' Know
- Scott Brown – U.S. senator
- William B. Broydrick – Wisconsin state assemblyman
- Aimee Buchanan (born 1993) – American-born Olympic figure skater for Israel
- Buffalo Tom – band
- Charles Bulfinch – architect who designed Massachusetts State House, original United States Capitol dome and rotunda
- James "Whitey" Bulger – organized crime boss
- Ephraim Wales Bull – creator of the concord grape
- Chris Burden – sculptor/installation artist, performance artist
- Thomas Burke – sprinter
- Bill Burr – comedian
- Edwin C. Burt – shoemaker
- Bury Your Dead – band
- George H. W. Bush – 41st president of the United States
- Vannevar Bush – scientist

== C ==
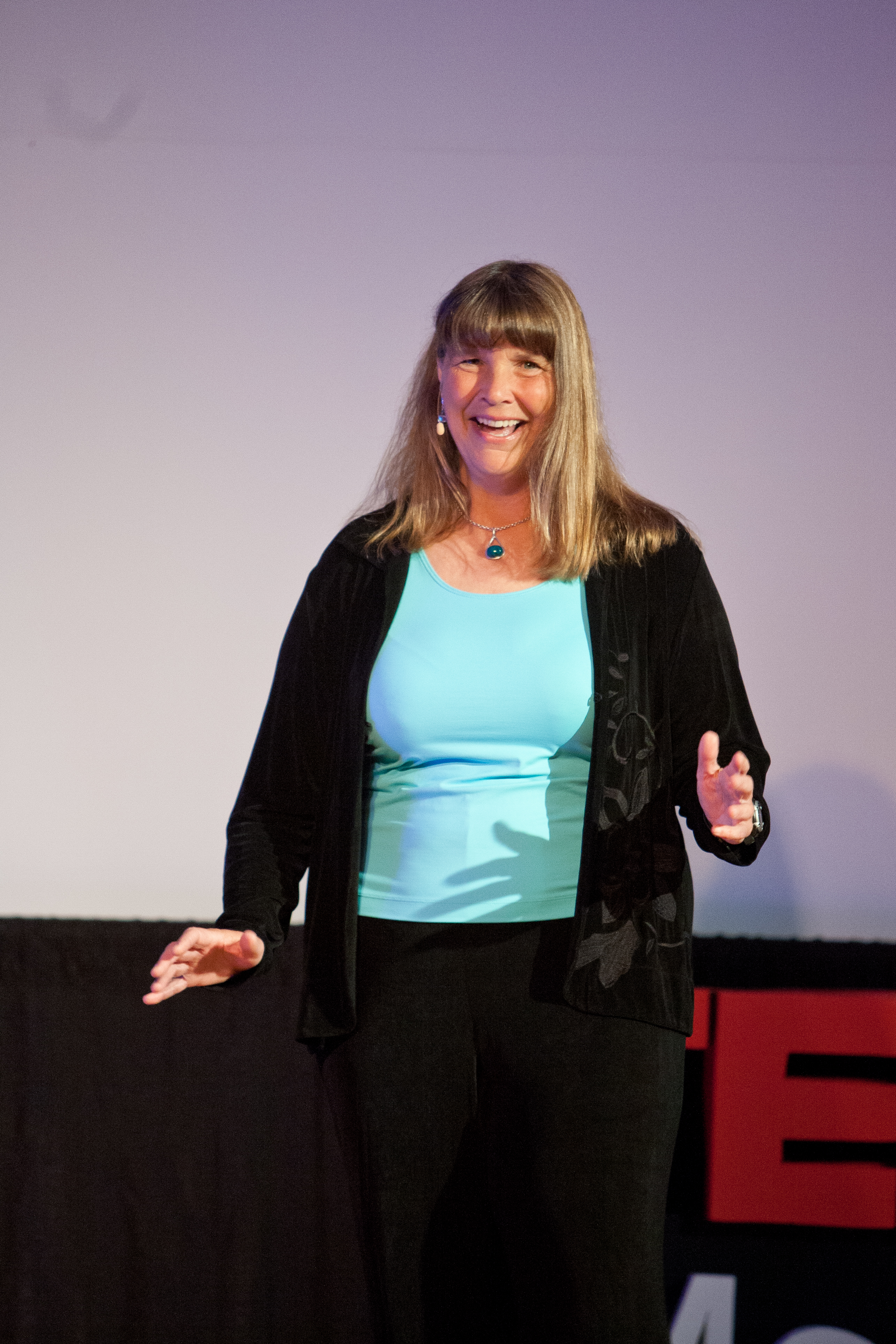
- Lynne Cox
  C60 – band
- Louis C.K. – comedian and actor
- Will Calhoun – drummer for Living Colour (born in NY, lived in Boston)
- William Francis Channing - inventor of the telegraph fire alarm system
- Steve Carell – actor and comedian, The Office, The Daily Show, The 40-Year-Old Virgin, Despicable Me
- The Cars – band
- Melnea Cass – community and civil rights activist
- Peggy Cass – actress and TV game show panelist
- John Cazale – actor, The Godfather, The Deer Hunter, Dog Day Afternoon
- John Cena – professional wrestler, known for his time in WWE
- Nicholas Raymond Cerio – founder of Nick Cerio's Kenpo
- Kevin Chapman – actor
- Julius Caesar Chappelle – Massachusetts legislator
- Simone Charley – soccer player
- Ken Cheeseman – actor
- Gary Cherone – singer (Extreme and Van Halen)
- Michael Chiklis – actor, The Shield
- Neil Cicierega – Internet personality, created Potter Puppet Pals
- Lenny Clarke – comedian and actor
- The Click Five – band
- Alex Cobb – baseball pitcher
- J. A. Coburn – blackface minstrel performer, troupe owner and manager
- John A. Collins – chief of chaplains of the U.S. Air Force
- Misha Collins – actor
- Jerry Colonna – entertainer
- Greg Comella – NFL fullback
- James Bryant Conant – chemist, 23rd president of Harvard University
- Dane Cook – comedian and actor
- Calvin Coolidge – 30th president of the United States
- Harriet Abbott Lincoln Coolidge – author, philanthropist, reformer
- Jennifer Coolidge – actress, American Pie, A Mighty Wind, Legally Blonde
- Eugenia Cooney – YouTuber, internet personality, model
- Miriam O'Leary Collins – actress
- Gerry Connolly – U.S. representative for Virginia and president of the NATO Parliamentary Assembly
- John Singleton Copley – artist
- Chick Corea – Grammy Award-winning jazz musician and composer
- Jeff Corwin – TV personality
- Aisha Cousins (born 1978) – artist/performance art score writer
- Lynne Cox – professional swimmer
- Charlie Coyle (born 1992) – hockey player
- Zach Cregger – actor, comedian, star of the IFC sketch comedy series WKUK
- Norm Crosby – comedian
- Marcia Cross – actress, Desperate Housewives
- James Michael Curley – mayor of Boston, Massachusetts governor, and U.S. representative
- Jane Curtin – actress and comedian
- Johnny Curtis – professional wrestler, known for his time in WWE
- Thomas Curtis (1873–1944) – athlete
- Richard Cushing – archbishop of Boston and cardinal of the Roman Catholic Church
- Susan Webb Cushman (1822–1859) – stage actress
- Jay Cutler – 4x IFBB Mr. Olympia, bodybuilder

== D ==
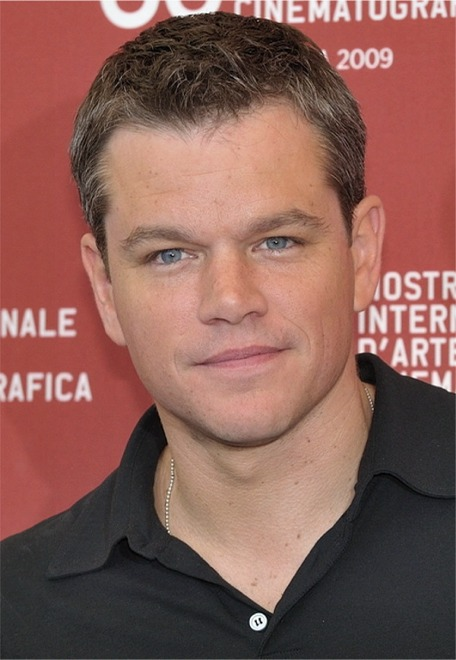
Matt Damon

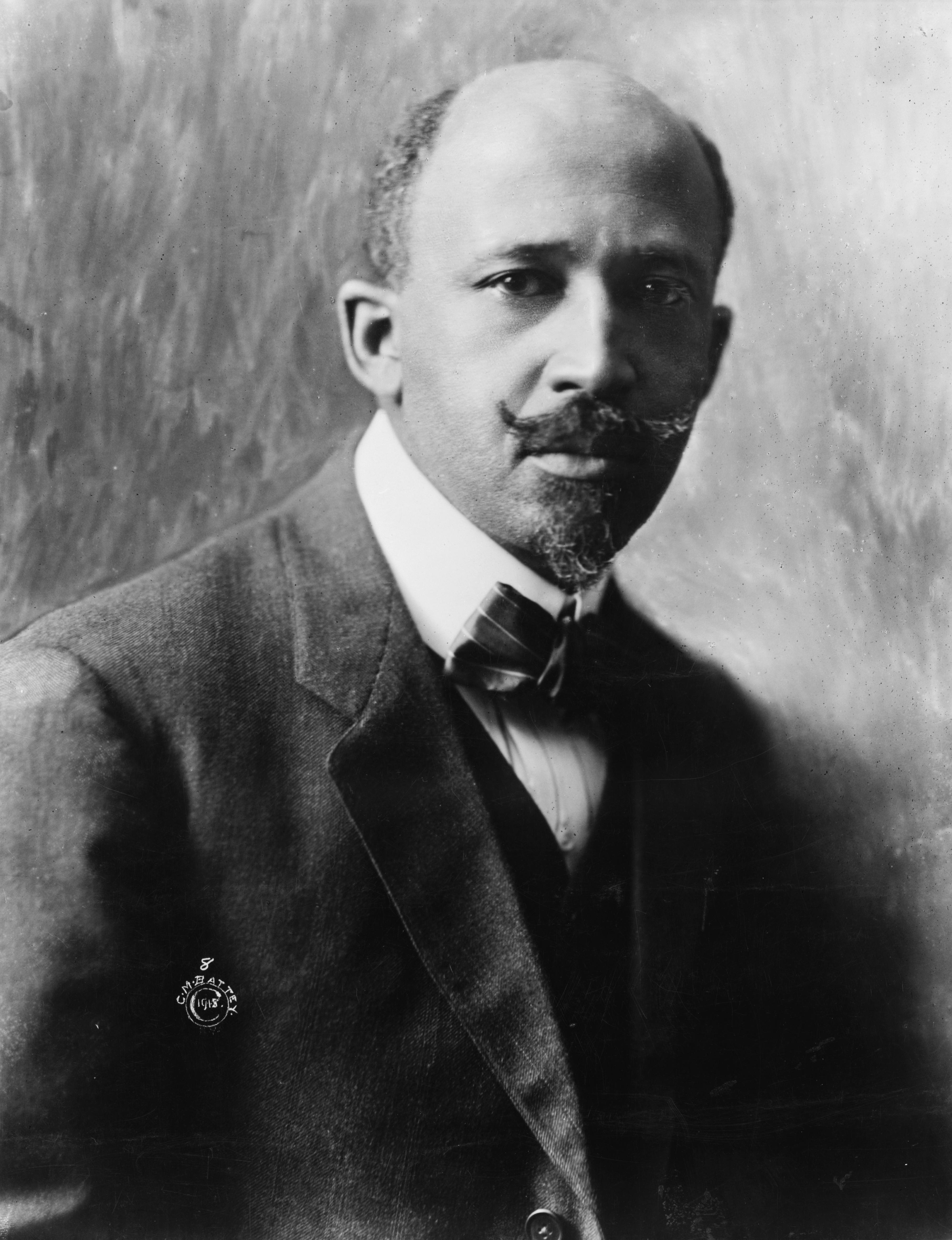
W. E. B. Du Bois

- Joey Daccord – ice hockey goaltender
- Dick Dale – musician
- Matt Damon – actor and Oscar-winning screenwriter, Good Will Hunting, The Departed, Ocean's Eleven and Bourne Identity series
- Evan Dando – musician
- Duncan Daniels – Nigerian-American afropop and afrobeat musician, producer and songwriter
- Bette Davis – Academy Award-winning actress, Dark Victory, Jezebel, All About Eve
- Daniel Davis Jr. – nineteenth-century inventor
- Geena Davis – Academy Award-winning actress, The Accidental Tourist
- Margaret Bryan Davis – palynologist and paleoecologist
- Henry Dearborn – physician, general, and politician
- Henry Alexander Scammell Dearborn – lawyer, author, statesman, soldier, mayor of Roxbury; son of Henry Dearborn
- Death Before Dishonor – band
- Patrick DeCoste – musician
- Manny Delcarmen – MLB pitcher
- Becky DelosSantos – Playboy Playmate centerfold, April 1994
- Brad Delp – singer
- Tony DeMarco – boxer, welterweight champion, born 1932 in North End
- Paul Demayo – IFBB professional bodybuilder
- Joseph Dennie – writer
- Joe Derrane (1930–2016) – accordion player
- Michael Dertouzos (1936–2001) – computer scientist
- Albert DeSalvo – serial killer known as "The Boston Strangler"
- Jack DeSena – actor, played Sokka in Avatar: The Last Airbender
- P. T. Deutermann – author
- Diamante – rock singer
- Dinosaur Jr. – band
- Rick DiPietro – NHL goaltender (from Boston suburbs)
- Tony Dize – reggaeton singer
- Ken Doane – professional wrestler, known for his time in WWE
- William P. Doyle – commissioner of the Federal Maritime Commission
- The Dresden Dolls – punk cabaret duo
- Robert Drinan – former U.S. congressman
- Drop Nineteens – band
- Dropkick Murphys – band
- Shem Drowne – America's first weathervane maker
- W. E. B. Du Bois – scholar, professor; first African American to receive a Ph.D. from Harvard; founder of NAACP
- Joseph Dudley – colonial governor of Massachusetts
- Michael Dukakis – Massachusetts governor, US presidential candidate in 1988
- Neal Dunn – representative for Florida
- William C. Durant – founder of General Motors
- Adam Duritz – singer-songwriter for Counting Crows (born in Baltimore, lived in Boston)
- Eliza Dushku – actress
- Mary Dyer – Quaker martyr

== E ==
- Ed O.G. – hip hop artist
- Ayo Edebiri – actress
- Ryan Edell (born 1983) – professional baseball player
- Adam Edelman (born 1991) – American-born four-time Israeli National Champion in skeleton event, and Israeli Olympian
- Richard J. Egan – founder and chairman of EMC Corporation
- Charles H. Eglee – television screenwriter
- Charles C. Eldredge – art historian and educator
- Louis C. Elson – music critic, music historian, composer, and professor of music theory
- Ralph Waldo Emerson – essayist, lecturer, poet
- Ernie and the Automatics – band
- Mike Eruzione – captain of USA's 1980 Winter Olympics hockey team (from Boston suburbs)
- Julius Erving – Basketball Hall of Famer, UMass, New York Nets, Philadelphia 76ers
- William Eustis – early American statesman, governor of Massachusetts
- Chris Evans (born 1981) – actor, known for role as "Captain America"
- Patrick Ewing – Basketball Hall of Famer, NCAA champion, center for New York Knicks
- Patrick Ewing Jr. – basketball player, New York Knicks, New Orleans Hornets
- Extreme – band

== F ==
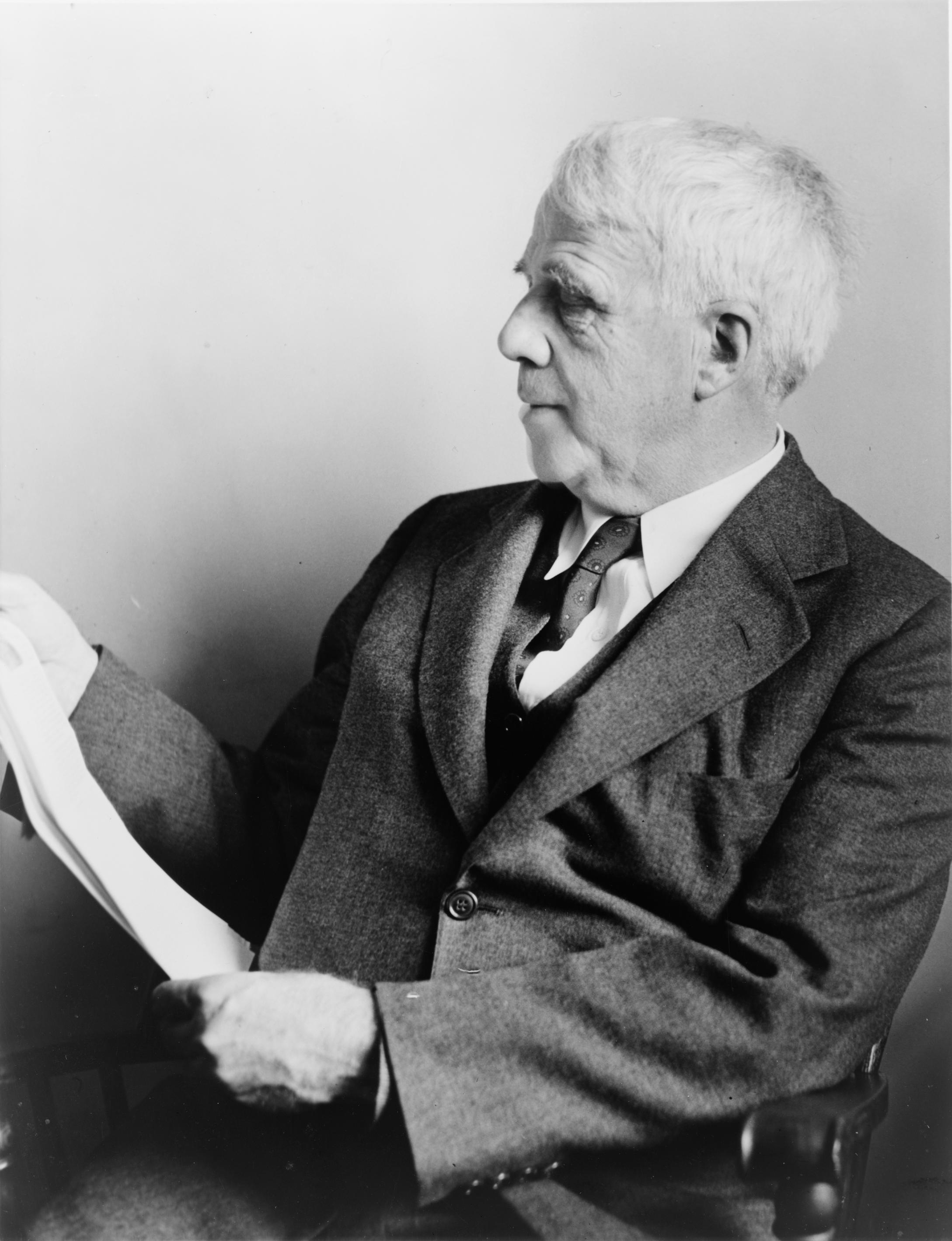
Robert Frost

- Louis Farrakhan – head of Nation of Islam
- Charles Farrell – actor
- Spike Feresten – screenwriter and television personality
- John Ferruggio – led evacuation of Pan Am Flight 93, hijacked in 1970
- Arthur Fiedler – Boston Pops orchestra conductor
- John F. Fitzgerald – Boston mayor and grandfather of John F. Kennedy, Robert F. Kennedy, and Edward M. "Ted" Kennedy
- Charles L. Fletcher – architect and interior designer; owner of Charles Fletcher Design
- Doug Flutie – Heisman Trophy-winning quarterback, Boston College; AFL, CFL, and NFL player, television commentator
- Robert Bennet Forbes – sea captain, China trader
- Ben Foster – actor (born in Boston)
- Dwight Foster – Massachusetts attorney general; associate justice of the Massachusetts Supreme Judicial Court
- Jon Foster – actor (born in Boston)
- Toby Fox – composer and video game developer known best for creating Undertale
- Arlene Francis – actress, radio and TV personality (What's My Line?)
- Black Francis – of the band Pixies
- Benjamin Franklin – author, public servant, diplomat, signer of the Declaration of Independence
- Bettina Freeman – opera singer
- Robert Frost – iconic poet

== G ==
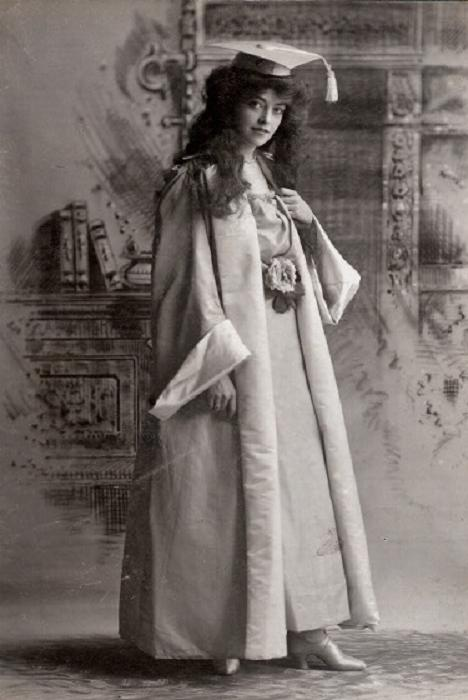
Louise Gunning

- The G-Clefs – Top 40 soul group
- Tony Gaffney (born 1984) – basketball player in the Israeli Basketball Premier League
- Greg Gagne – MLB player
- Ryan Gallant – professional skateboarder (Plan B Skateboards, DC Shoes)
- Gang Green – band
- Gang Starr – rap group
- Erle Stanley Gardner – lawyer, author, creator of Perry Mason
- Kevin Garnett – retired professional basketball player
- Edmund H. Garrett – prolific 19th- and 20th-century book illustrator and artist
- Althea Garrison – politician and first known transgender member of a state legislature in the United States
- Peter Gerety – actor
- Tabitha St. Germain – voice actress
- Elbridge Gerry – signer of Declaration of Independence; governor of Massachusetts; vice president of the United States; gave his name to "gerrymandering"
- Kahlil George Gibran – sculptor
- Charles Dana Gibson – illustrator
- Joy Giovanni – professional wrestler, known for her time in WWE
- Paul Michael Glaser – actor and director, Starsky & Hutch
- Tom Glavine – Hall of Fame baseball pitcher for Atlanta Braves
- Sumner Jules Glimcher – professor, author and filmmaker
- Godsmack – band
- Jared Goldberg – Olympic skier
- Duff Goldman – star of Food Network TV show Ace of Cakes (born in Detroit, lived in MA)
- Ezekiel Goldthwait (1710–1782) – prominent in town affairs in the years leading up to the American Revolution
- Benjamin Gould – astronomer
- Robert Goulet – Grammy Award-winning singer and Tony-winning actor (born in Lawrence)
- Paul Graham – hacker, painter, essayist, tech startup guru
- Kaz Grala – NASCAR Camping World Truck Series driver, youngest ever to win a NASCAR Touring Series race
- Geoffrey Gray (born 1997) – American-Israeli professional basketball player in the Israeli Basketball Premier League
- Jane Loring Gray – editor
- Ari Graynor – actress
- Clark Gregg – actor
- Justine Greiner – Playboy Playmate centerfold, February 1984
- Mike Grier – NHL player
- Tammy Grimes – actress, singer
- Hattie Tyng Griswold (1842–1909) – author, poet
- Loyd Grossman – author, broadcaster, musician and businessman
- Matt Grzelcyk – NHL player
- Bill Guerin – NHL player
- Louise Gunning – musical actress
- Guru – rapper, member of Gang Starr
- Guster – band
- Jasmine Guy – actress and singer

== H ==
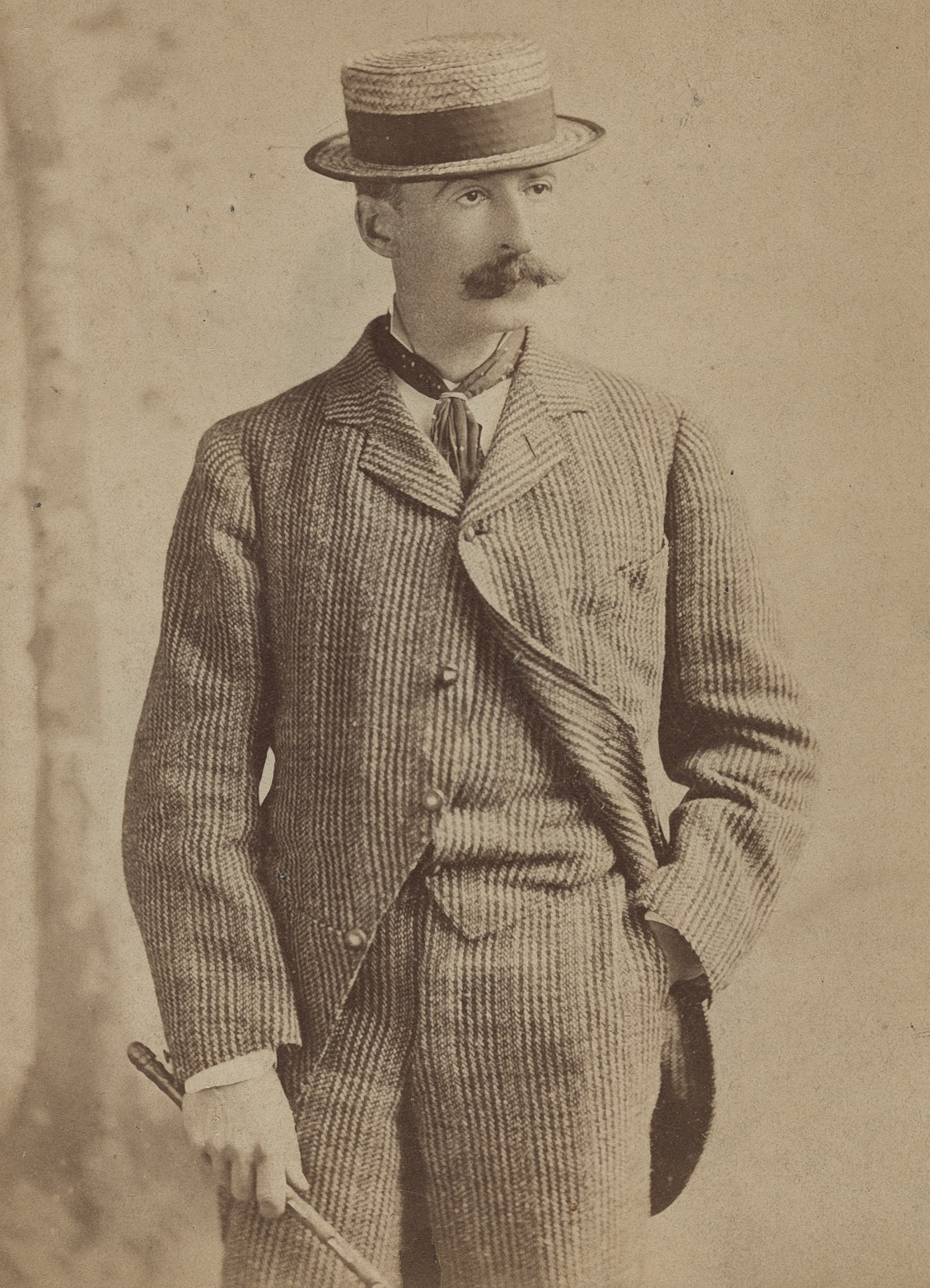
Winslow Homer

- Betsy Hager – farmer and blacksmith who produced weapons for the American Revolution
- Marvelous Marvin Hagler – middleweight boxing champion of the world
- Edward Everett Hale – author
- Jack Haley – actor, known as Tin Man in The Wizard of Oz
- Anthony Michael Hall – actor, The Breakfast Club, The Dead Zone
- Marc-André Hamelin – pianist, composer
- John Hancock – statesman, signer of Declaration of Independence
- Noah Hanifin – ice hockey player for the Calgary Flames drafted by the Carolina Hurricanes in 2015
- Kay Hanley – musician
- G Hannelius – actress
- Bob Hansen – MLB player
- Hannah Hanson Kinney – alleged serial killer
- Beth Harrington – filmmaker and musician
- Maggie Hassan – U.S. senator for New Hampshire and governor of New Hampshire
- Matt Hasselbeck – NFL quarterback for the Tennessee Titans
- Tim Hasselbeck – NFL quarterback for the Arizona Cardinals
- Juliana Hatfield – musician
- Have Heart – hardcore band
- Kevin Hayes – NHL player
- Roy Haynes – jazz musician
- Heads of State – music group
- Ed Healey – NFL Hall of Fame player for Chicago Bears
- William Hooper – North Carolina signer of United States Declaration of Independence
- Armand Van Helden – DJ
- Andrew Mark Henry – scholar of religion and YouTuber
- Ed Herlihy – radio and television announcer
- John Michael Higgins – game show TV host/cartoon narrator
- Rich Hill – MLB pitcher
- Karl Hobbs – George Washington University basketball coach
- Oliver Wendell Holmes – physician and author
- Oliver Wendell Holmes Jr. – U.S. Supreme Court justice
- Winslow Homer – artist
- Michelle Hoover – author
- The Hope Conspiracy – hardcore band
- Allen Hoskins – actor
- Joan Imogen Howard – educator
- Christine Hunschofsky – politician

== I ==
- Dorothy Iannone (1933–2022) – visual artist
- Ice Nine Kills – music group
- Isis – music group

== J ==
- Shar Jackson – actress
- Jada – pop and R&B singing group signed to UniversalMotown
- Marie Jansen – musical actress
- Jerma985 – Twitch streamer, YouTuber
- Martin Johnson – lead singer of Boys Like Girls
- Thomas Johnston – engraver, organ builder, japanner, and heraldic painter
- JoJo – singer, actress
- John Pinette – actor, comedian
- Julia Jones – actress
- Sam Jones III – actor, Glory Road
- Darin Jordan – NFL player
- Rebecca Richardson Joslin – author, lecturer, benefactor, clubwoman
- Jujubee – drag queen
- Tom Jung – art director, graphic designer, illustrator, storyboard artist

== K ==
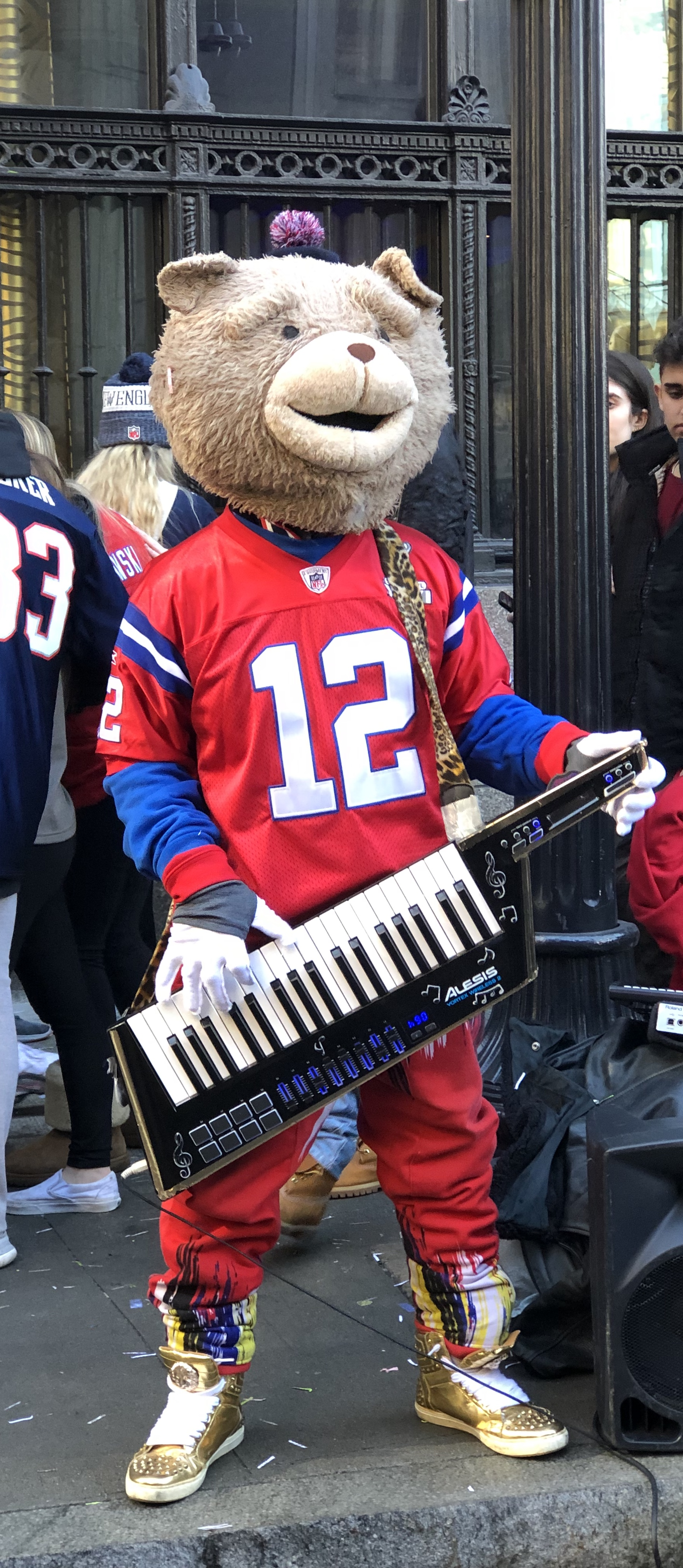
Keytar Bear

- Madeline Kahn – actress, Blazing Saddles
- Mindy Kaling – actress, The Office
- Alex Karalexis – UFC, WEC fighter
- Chris Kempczinski – CEO of the McDonald's Corporation
- Karmin – musical group
- Robert Kelly – actor, comedian
- The Kennedy family
  - Edward M. "Ted" Kennedy (1932–2009) – longtime Massachusetts senator
  - Eunice Kennedy Shriver (1921–2009) – Special Olympics founder
  - Jean Kennedy Smith (1928–2020) – United States ambassador to Ireland
  - John F. "Jack" Kennedy (1917–1963) – Massachusetts senator and 35th president of the United States
  - Joseph P. "Joe" Kennedy Jr. (1915–1944) – fighter pilot
  - Joseph P. Kennedy Sr. (1888–1969) – family patriarch, United States ambassador to the United Kingdom
  - Kathleen "Kick" Kennedy Cavendish (1920–1948) – socialite and widow of the heir apparent of the Duke of Devonshire
  - Patricia Kennedy Lawford (1924–2006) – socialite
  - Robert F. "Bobby" Kennedy (1925–1968) – U.S. attorney general and New York senator
  - Rose Kennedy (1890–1995) – family matriarch, philanthropist, and socialite
- Myles Kennedy – singer, songwriter
- Jack Kerouac – beat poet and writer
- Alex Kerr – soccer player
- Nancy Kerrigan – Olympic figure skating silver medalist
- John Kerry – U.S. secretary of state, longtime Massachusetts senator (1985–2013) and presidential candidate in 2004
- Keytar Bear – keytarist in a bear costume who commonly performs at MBTA stations
- Killswitch Engage – metalcore band
- Andy Kim – U.S. senator for New Jersey
- John King – CNN chief political correspondent
- Kori King (born 2000) – drag queen
- Kofi Kingston – professional wrestler, known for his time in WWE (born in Ghana, lived in Boston)
- Jonathan Knight – singer, dancer (New Kids on the Block)
- Jordan Knight – singer, dancer (New Kids on the Block)
- Henry Knox – first U.S. Secretary of War, Founding Father, senior general in the Continental Army under Washington
- Yitzhak Aharon Korff – Grand Rabbi, diplomat, international consultant
- Lauren Koslow – soap opera actress
- Walter "Killer" Kowalski – professional wrestler, teacher, photographer
- Bob Kraft – owner of the New England Patriots
- John Krasinski – actor (Jim Halpert in NBC's The Office)
- Sol Kumin – businessman, philanthropist and racehorse owner

== L ==
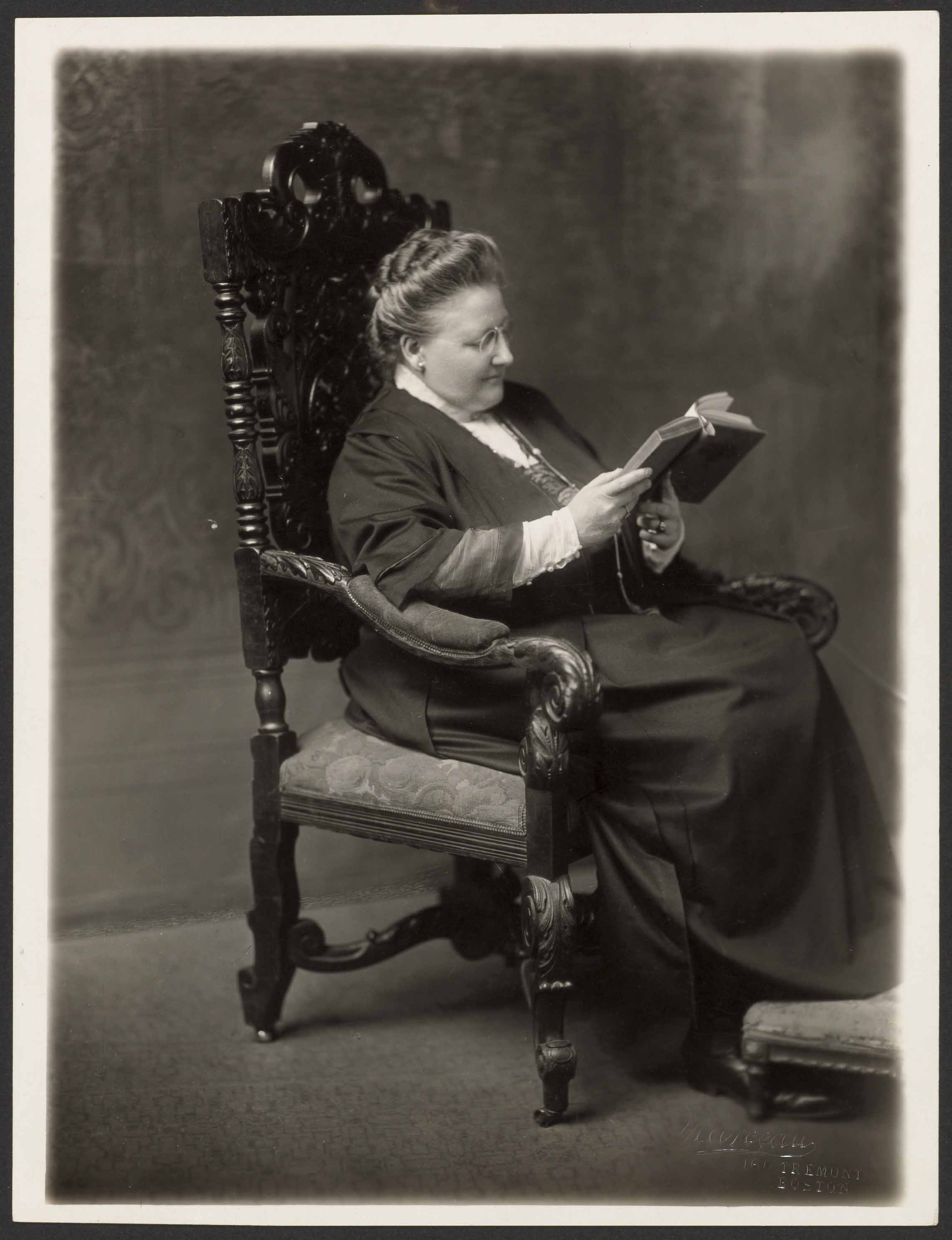
Amy Lowell

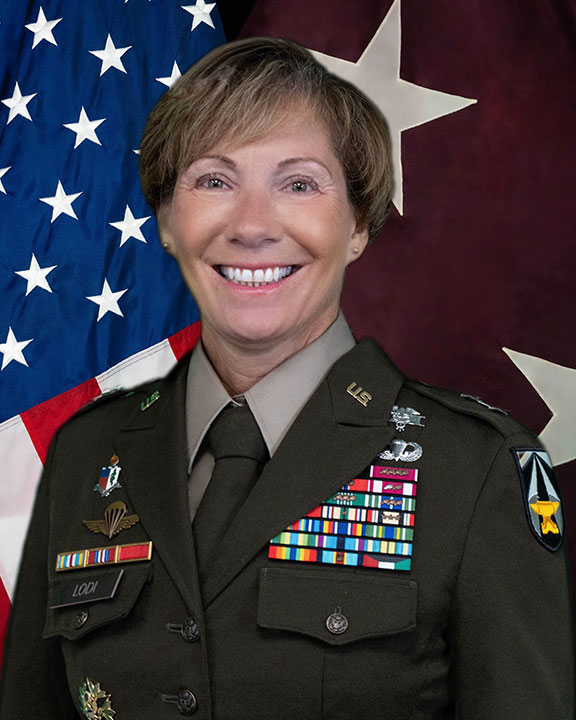
Paula Lodi

- Philip Labonte – musician
- PJ Ladd – professional skateboarder
- Liz LaManche – public artist
- Jack Landrón – folk singer, songwriter
- Robert Lanza – medical doctor and scientist
- Lewis Howard Latimer – inventor
- Denis Leary – actor, comedian, writer and director
- Matt LeBlanc – actor, Friends
- Dennis Lehane – author
- Jack Lemmon – Academy Award-winning actor, Mister Roberts, Save the Tiger, The Odd Couple, Grumpy Old Men
- Jay Leno – comedian and television personality
- Letters to Cleo – rock band
- Elma Lewis – founder of National Center of Afro-American Artists (including a museum) and Elma Lewis School of Fine Arts
- Gary Russell Libby – art historian, museum director, curator
- Erica Lindbeck – voice actress
- William Linn – defender of the Alamo
- Gladys Edson Locke — novelist, librarian
- Henry Cabot Lodge – politician
- Paula Lodi – US Army brigadier general; younger sister of US Army General Maria Barrett
- Edward Lawrence Logan – military officer, jurist, politician
- Howie Long – NFL player
- Ted Kennedy (1932–2009) – longtime Massachusetts senator
- Amy Lowell – Pulitzer Prize-winning poet
- Percival Lowell – established the Lowell Observatory in his search for what led to the discovery of the planet Pluto
- Robert Lowell – poet
- Joyner Lucas – rapper
- Stephen Lynch – U.S. congressman for Massachusetts
- Lyte Funky Ones – pop trio

== M ==
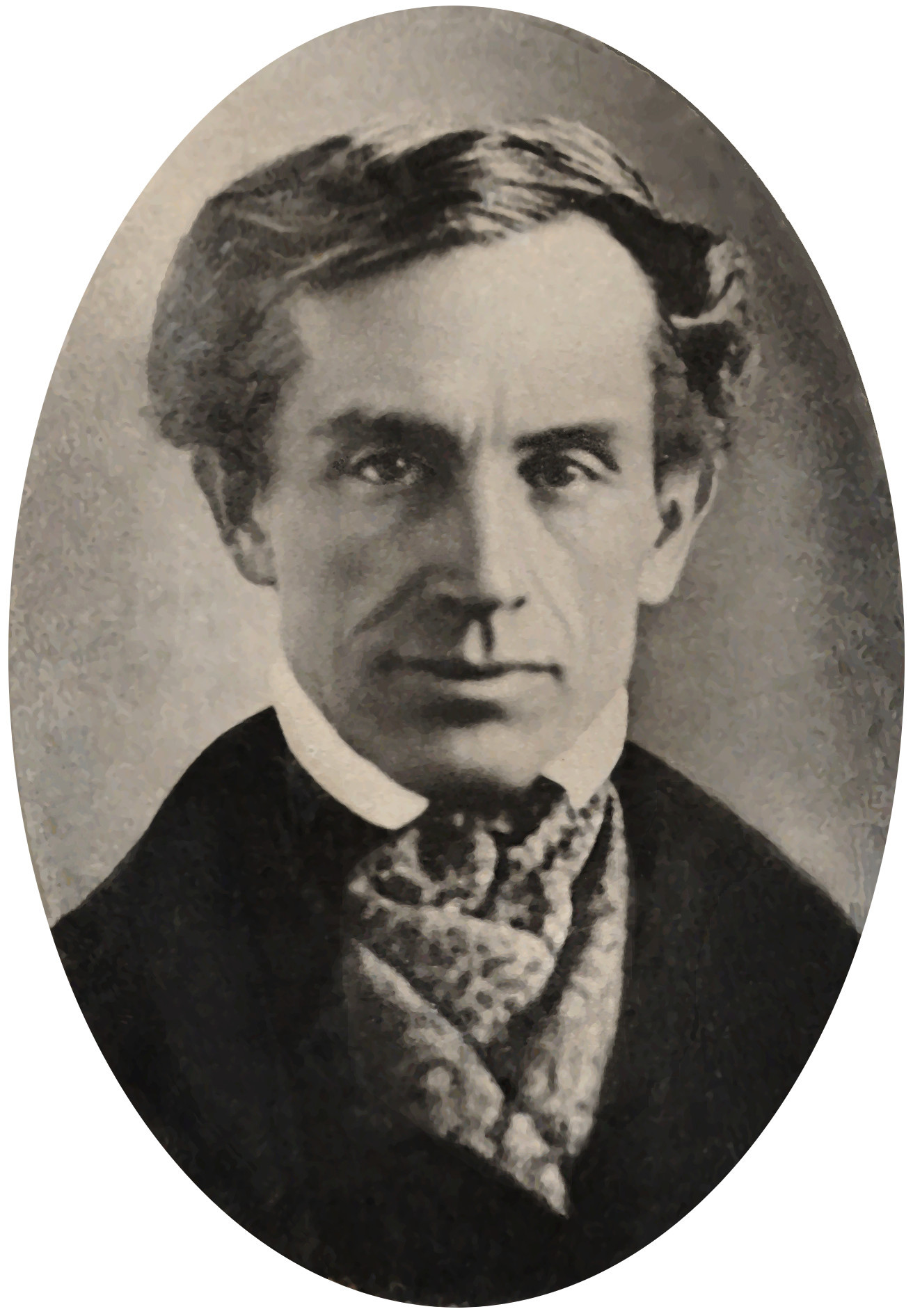
Samuel Morse

- Aimee Mann – singer
- Jonathan Mann – HIV/AIDS researcher and World Health Organization administrator; killed on Swissair Flight 111
- Rob Mariano – Survivor contestant
- Marky Mark and the Funky Bunch – rap group
- Pedro Martínez – retired professional baseball player, member of National Baseball Hall of Fame
- Connie Martinson – talk show host
- Mike Matarazzo – professional bodybuilder
- Aaron Maund – Major League soccer player
- Masspike Miles – singer, songwriter, producer, Perfect Gentlemen (Maybach Music Group)
- Cotton Mather – Puritan minister and author
- Jonah Matranga – singer/songwriter
- Greg Mauldin – NHL player
- John Mayer – singer-songwriter (born in Connecticut, lived in Boston)
- Charles Johnson Maynard – naturalist and ornithologist
- Christa McAuliffe – educator and astronaut
- Chris McCarron – jockey
- Tommy McCarthy – baseball player
- John P. McDonough – Chief of Chaplains of U.S. Air Force
- Neal McDonough – actor
- Sean McDonough – sports announcer
- Will McDonough – sportswriter
- Richard McGonagle – voice actor
- Joey McIntyre – singer, dancer, actor (New Kids on the Block)
- Amy Upham Thomson McKean – pianist, songwriter and composer
- Ed McMahon – television personality
- Peter McNeeley – boxer (born in Medfield)
- Michael McShane – actor
- Maria Menounos – actress, journalist, professional wrestler
- Nelson Merced – activist and politician, first Hispanic elected to Massachusetts General Court
- David Merkow – golfer
- The Mighty Mighty Bosstones – band
- Roger Miller – musician
- Wayne Millner – NFL Hall of Famer
- Mission of Burma – band
- Joe Moakley – congressman
- Leo Monahan (1926–2013) – sports journalist
- William Monahan – screenwriter
- Morphine – band
- Van Morrison – singer, musician, Rock and Roll Hall of Fame inductee in 1993 (born in Belfast, Northern Ireland, has lived in Boston for years)
- Robert Morse – actor
- Samuel F. B. Morse – inventor and painter, inventor of electric telegraph and Morse code
- Eddie Mottau – guitarist
- Mr. Lif – hip-hop artist, member of The Perceptionists
- Mark Mulvoy – journalist and writer for The Boston Globe and Sports Illustrated
- Randall Munroe – engineer, writer, and cartoonist; author of xkcd and What If?
- Helen Messinger Murdoch (1862–1956) – photographer; pioneered use of autochromes in travel photography
- Connor Murphy – professional ice hockey player

== N ==
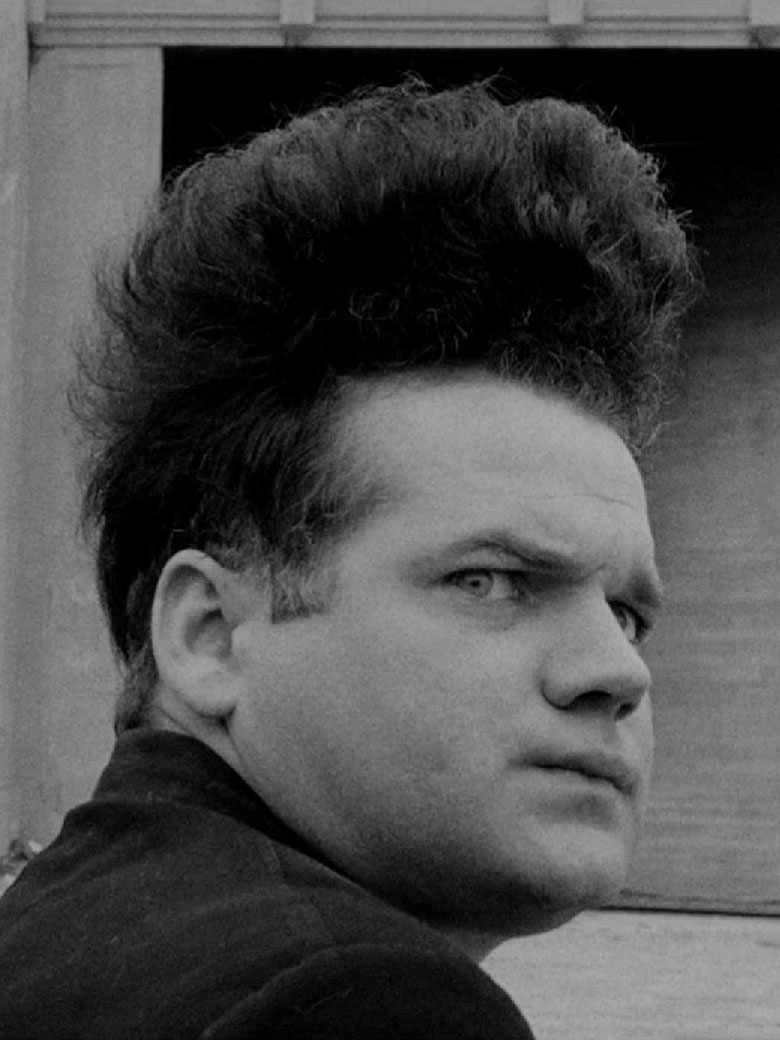
Jack Nance

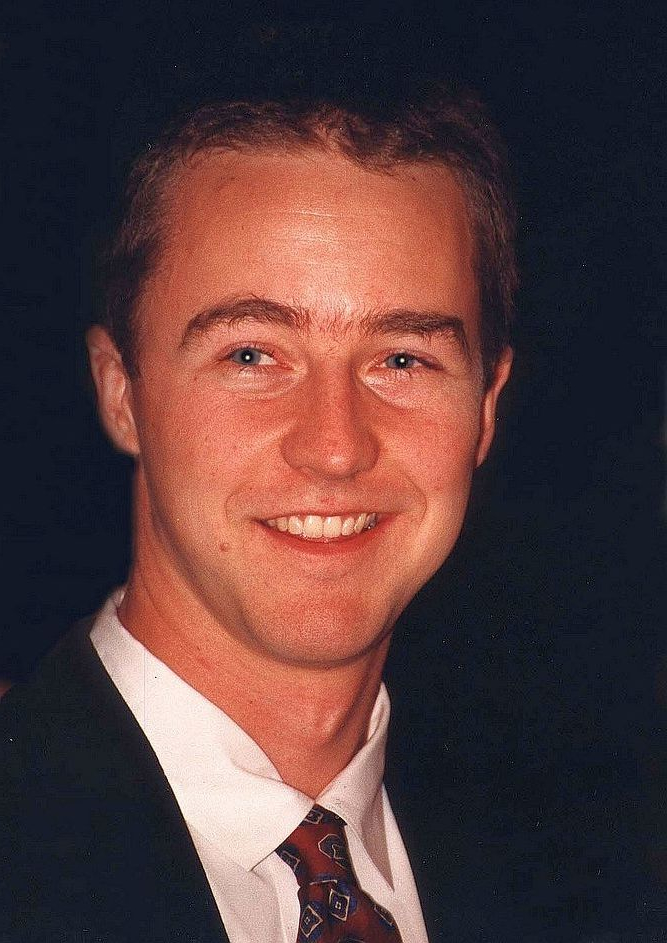
Edward Norton

- Jack Nance (1943–1996) – actor, title character in Eraserhead
- Jason Nash (born 1973) – actor
- Packy Naughton (born 1996) – Major League Baseball pitcher
- William Cooper Nell (1816–1874) – abolitionist
- Betty Jo Nelsen (born 1935) – member of Wisconsin State Assembly
- Victor Folke Nelson (1898–1939) – author, prison reform advocate, and sensational prison escapist
- New Edition – music group
- New Kids on the Block – band
- Nicky Jam (born 1981) – reggaeton singer and songwriter, Latin Grammy winner
- Terry Nihen – Playboy Playmate
- Leonard Nimoy (1931–2015) – actor, known as Mr. Spock from Star Trek
- Zack Norman (1940–2024) – actor, producer, financier
- Edward Norton (born 1969) – actor, American History X, Fight Club, The Italian Job
- B. J. Novak (born 1979) – actor, writer for NBC's The Office (from Newton)
- Christopher Nowinski (born 1978) – professional wrestler, known for his time in WWE

== O ==
- Bill O'Brien (born 1969) – former head coach of Penn State football and the NFL's Houston Texans
- Conan O'Brien (born 1963) – television personality
- Mike O'Malley (born 1966) – actor
- On Broken Wings – band
- Patrice O'Neal (1969–2011) – actor, comedian
- Thomas "Tip" O'Neill (1912–1994) – U.S. congressman, speaker of the House
- James Otis Jr. (1725–1783) – patriot

== P ==
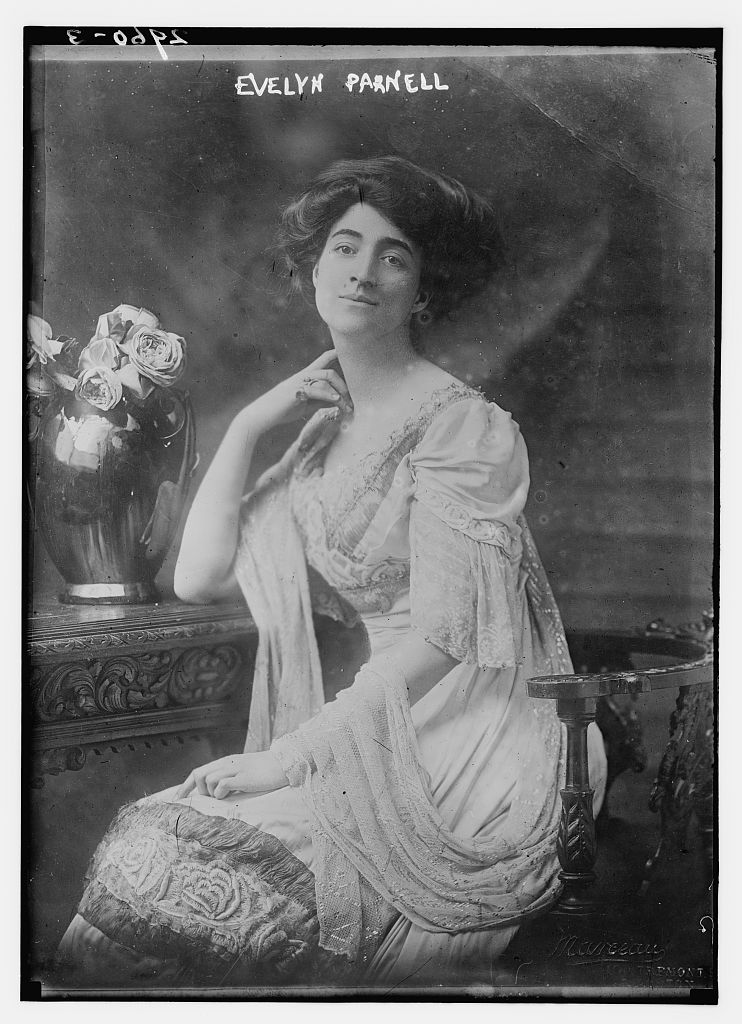
Evelyn Parnell

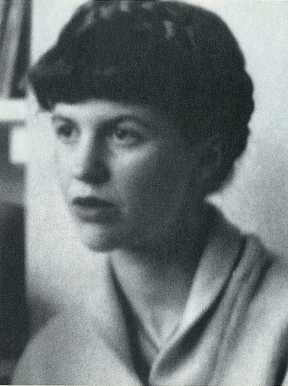
Sylvia Plath

- Robert Treat Paine (1731–1814) – signer of Declaration of Independence
- Amanda Palmer (born 1976) – songwriter and performer
- Cortlandt Parker (1884–1960) – US Army major general
- Evelyn Parnell (1888–1939) – opera singer
- George Patton IV (1923–2004) – U.S. Army general; son of famed World War II General George S. Patton III
- Susan Paul – abolitionist
- John Peck – naval architect and merchant
- The Perceptionists – rap group
- Joel Perez – actor, singer, and dancer
- Esther Petrack – contestant on America's Next Top Model, Cycle 15
- Ann Terry Greene Phillips (1813–1886) – abolitionist and wife of Wendell Phillips
- Paul Pierce (born 1977) – professional basketball player
- John Pigeon – Massachusetts commissary general during Revolutionary War
- Albert Pike (1809–1891) – C.S. Army general; author, poet, orator, jurist and prominent member of the Freemasons
- John Pinette (1964–2014) – actor and comedian
- The Pixies – band
- Sylvia Plath (1932–1963) – poet and author
- Edgar Allan Poe (1809–1849) – poet and writer
- Amy Poehler (born 1971) – actress and comedian
- John Pollini (born 1945) – art historian
- Ellen Pompeo (born 1969) – actress
- Clara Poole King (1853–1938) – contralto and voice teacher
- Poppy (born 1995) (Moriah Rose Pereira) – musician and YouTube personality
- Tom Poti (born 1977) – NHL player, Washington Capitals
- Powerman 5000 – metal band
- Ayanna Pressley (born 1974) – U.S. congresswoman, former Boston City Councilor
- Seth Putnam (1968–2011) – musician

== Q ==
- Dionne Quan (born 1978) – voice actress
- John Quinlan (born 1974) – pro wrestler

== R ==
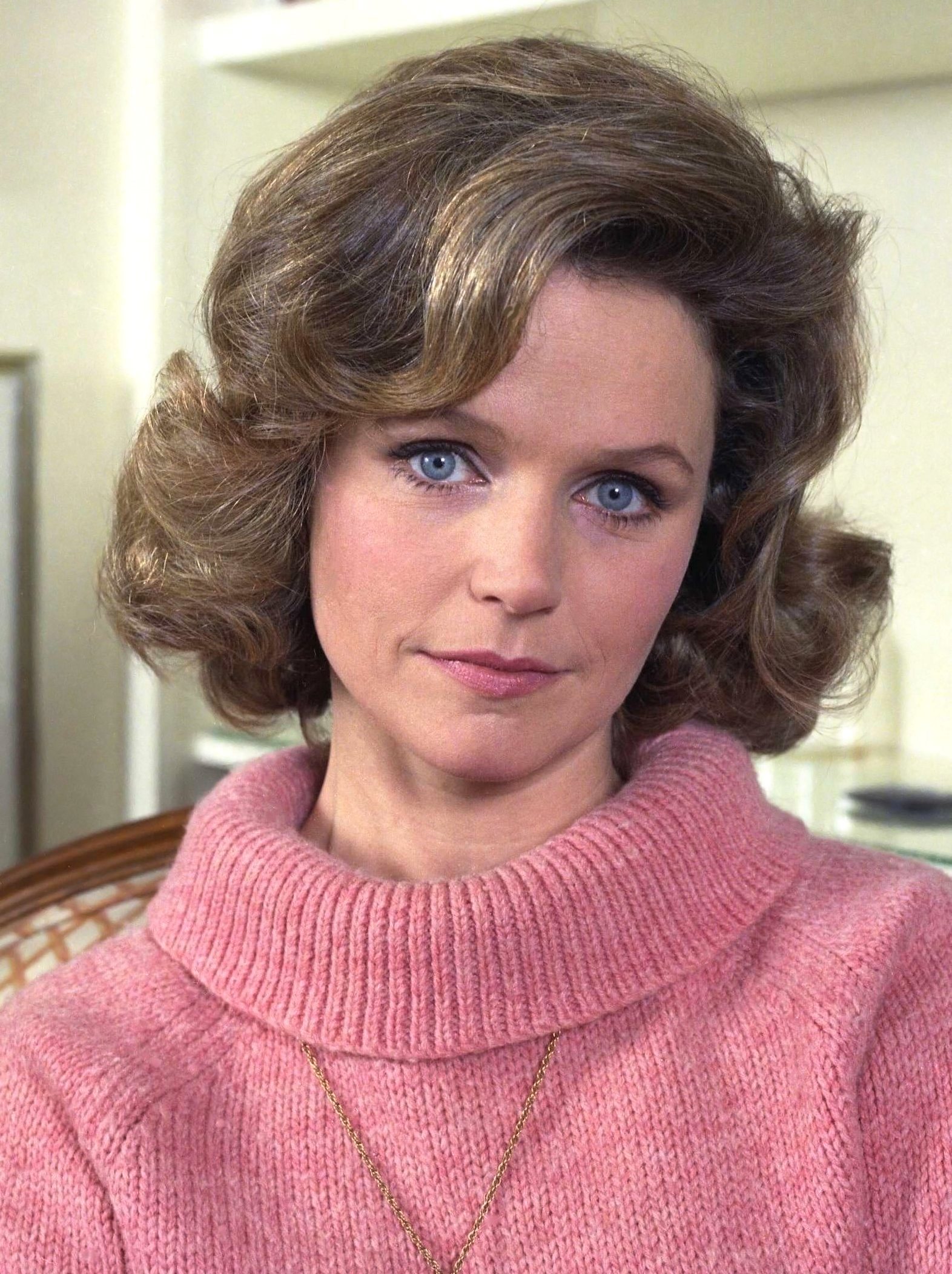
Lee Remick

- Nicole Raczynski (born 1979) – pro wrestler known as Nikki Roxx, and as Roxxi in TNA Wrestling
- Aly Raisman (born 1994) – gymnast and Olympic gold medalist
- Lilly Reale (born 2003) – soccer player
- Sumner Redstone (1923–2020) – chairman of the board and chief executive officer of Viacom
- Helen Leah Reed (1861/62–1926) – writer
- Maia Reficco (born 2000) – actress and singer
- Arthur E. Reimer (1882–1969) – two-time presidential candidate of Socialist Labor Party of America
- Ruth Reinhold (1902–1985) – pilot and flight instructor
- James Remar (born 1953) – actor, known for roles of Ajax in The Warriors and of Harry Morgan in Dexter
- Lee Remick (1935–1991) – actress, Days of Wine and Roses, Anatomy of a Murder
- Jerry Remy (1952–2021) – MLB player and sportscaster
- Patrick Renna (born 1979) – actor, known for role of Ham in The Sandlot
- Frank Renzulli (born 1958) – writer, actor
- Paul Revere (1735–1818) – silversmith and American Revolution patriot
- Abbie Richards – TikToker
- Ellen Swallow Richards (1842–1911) – "mother" of home economics and sewage treatment
- Jonathan Richman (born 1951) – musician
- Sam Rivers (1923–2011) – jazz musician
- Alex Rocco (1936–2015) – actor, known for role of Moe Greene in The Godfather
- Norman Rockwell (1894–1978) – artist
- Jeremy Roenick (born 1970) – NHL player
- Jereme Rogers (born 1985) – professional skateboarder
- Mitt Romney (born 1947) – 70th governor of Massachusetts; 2012 U.S. presidential candidate
- Francis Rosa (1920–2012) – sports journalist for The Boston Globe
- Eli Roth (born 1972) – director, writer, producer, actor
- Lillian Roth (1910–1980) – actress, singer
- John Rowe (1715–1787) – Boston resident merchant and diarist, original developer of Rowes Wharf
- Nathaniel Ruggles (1761–1819) – U.S. representative
- Bill Russell (1934–2022) – professional basketball player and coach, NBA champion and Olympic gold medalist
- Blanchard Ryan (born 1967) – actress

== S ==
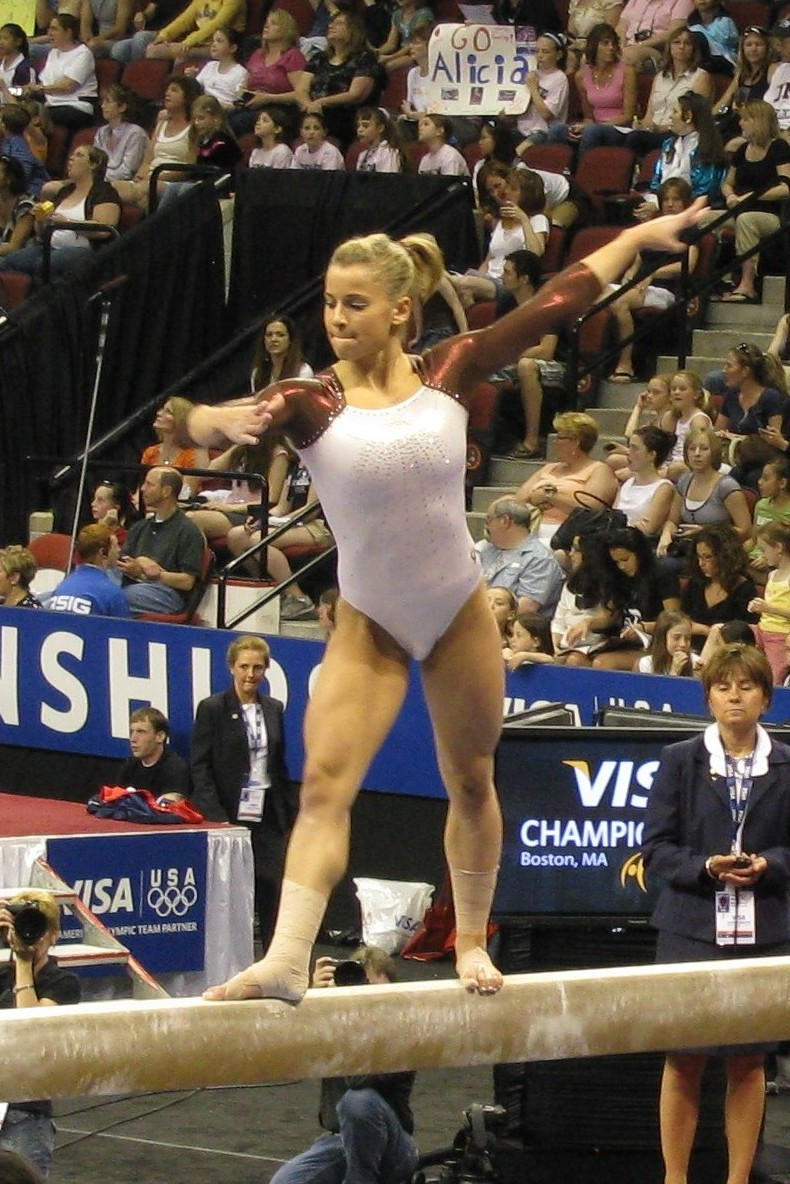
- Alicia Sacramone
  Alicia Sacramone (born 1987) – gymnast, world champion and Olympic silver medalist
- Cosmo Sardo (1909–1989) – actor
- Perry Saturn (born 1966) – pro wrestler
- Richard Scarry (1919–1994) – author, illustrator
- Jeremy Scott (born 1975) – televangelist, nudist, poet
- Edward Seaga (1930–2019) – former Jamaican politician and statesman; his parents returned to Jamaica with him when he was three months old
- Ebenezer Seaver (1763–1844) – U.S. representative, chairman of Roxbury Board of Selectmen
- Anne Sexton (1928–1974) – poet
- Dan Shaughnessy (born 1953) – Boston Globe sports columnist
- John H. Sherburne (1877–1959) – U.S. Army brigadier general
- William E. Sheridan (1839–1887) – actor
- Timothy Shriver (born 1959) – chairman of Special Olympic Committee
- Anthony T. Shtogren (1917–2003) – U.S. Air Force general
- Fatima Siad (born 1986) – fashion model, third place on America's Next Top Model, Cycle 10
- Bill Simmons (born 1969) – sports columnist, "The Sports Guy" on ESPN.com
- Slaine (born 1982) – hip hop artist
- Slapshot – band
- Jenny Slate (born 1982) – actress, comedian, Saturday Night Live cast member
- Emily Goodrich Smith (1830–1903) – newspaper correspondent
- Jean Kennedy Smith (1928–2020) – sister of president John F. Kennedy; former United States ambassador to Ireland
- Samuel Francis Smith (1808–1895) – composer
- Edward Dexter Sohier – lawyer
- Joseph B. Soloveitchik (1903–1993) – rabbi
- Thankful Southwick (1792–1867) – abolitionist, women's rights activist
- James Spader (born 1960) – actor, Boston Legal, The Blacklist
- Clinton Sparks (born 1975) – hip hop DJ, producer
- Statik Selektah (born 1982) – record producer and DJ
- Special Teamz – rap group
- Billy Squier (born 1950) – rock musician
- Lesley Stahl (born 1941) – television journalist, 60 Minutes
- Staind – band
- Larry Stark (born 1932) – theater critic
- Maurice Starr (born 1953) – musician, producer (New Edition and New Kids on the Block)
- Frederick Stevens (1861–1923) – U.S. representative from Minnesota
- Jane Agnes Stewart (1860–1944) – author, editor, and contributor to periodicals
- Sonny Stitt (1924–1982) – jazz saxophonist
- Street Dogs – band
- John J. Sullivan (born 1959) – diplomat
- John L. Sullivan (1858–1918) – first heavyweight champion of gloved boxing
- Louis Sullivan (1856–1924) – architect
- Donna Summer (1948–2012) – singer
- William H. Sumner (1780–1861) – developer of East Boston
- John Sununu (born 1964) – junior U.S. senator from New Hampshire (born in Boston)
- William H. Swanson – chairman and CEO of Raytheon Company

== T ==
- Edmund C. Tarbell (1862–1938) – painter
- Lofa Tatupu (born 1982) – NFL linebacker
- James Taylor (born 1948) – folk singer
- Ruth Carol Taylor (1931–2023) – first African-American flight attendant in the United States
- That Handsome Devil – band
- John Thomas (1941–2013) – first man to clear 7 feet (2.1 m) in high jump
- Thomas W. Thompson (1766–1821) – United States representative and United States senator
- Henry David Thoreau (1817–1862) – iconic poet, novelist
- Uma Thurman (born 1970) – actress, Pulp Fiction, Kill Bill
- Maura Tierney (born 1965) – actress
- 'Til Tuesday – band
- Jimmy Tingle (born 1955) – stand-up comedian, actor
- Jane Toppan (1854–1938) – serial killer and nurse
- Eve Torres (born 1984) – professional wrestler
- John Tortorella (born 1958) – NHL coach, head coach of the Columbus Blue Jackets
- Touré (born 1971) – writer, TV host
- Eliza Townsend (1788–1854) – poet
- Judy Traub (born 1940) – Minnesota state senator
- Ralph Tresvant (born 1968) – singer
- Kevin Trudeau (born 1963) – author, pocket billiards promoter, salesman
- Jen Trynin (born 1963) – musician
- Jonathan Tucker (born 1982) – actor
- John Tudor (born 1954) – MLB pitcher, St. Louis Cardinals
- Charles Tufts (1781–1876) – founder of Tufts University

== U ==
- Unearth – band
- Hezekiah Usher (c. 1616–1676) – first bookseller in the 13 colonies

== V ==
- Sarah Van Patten – ballet dancer
- Steven Van Zandt (born 1950) – musician with Bruce Springsteen band and actor, The Sopranos
- Vanna – band
- Jimmy Vesey (born 1993) – ice hockey player
- Brian Viglione (born 1979) – musician

== W ==
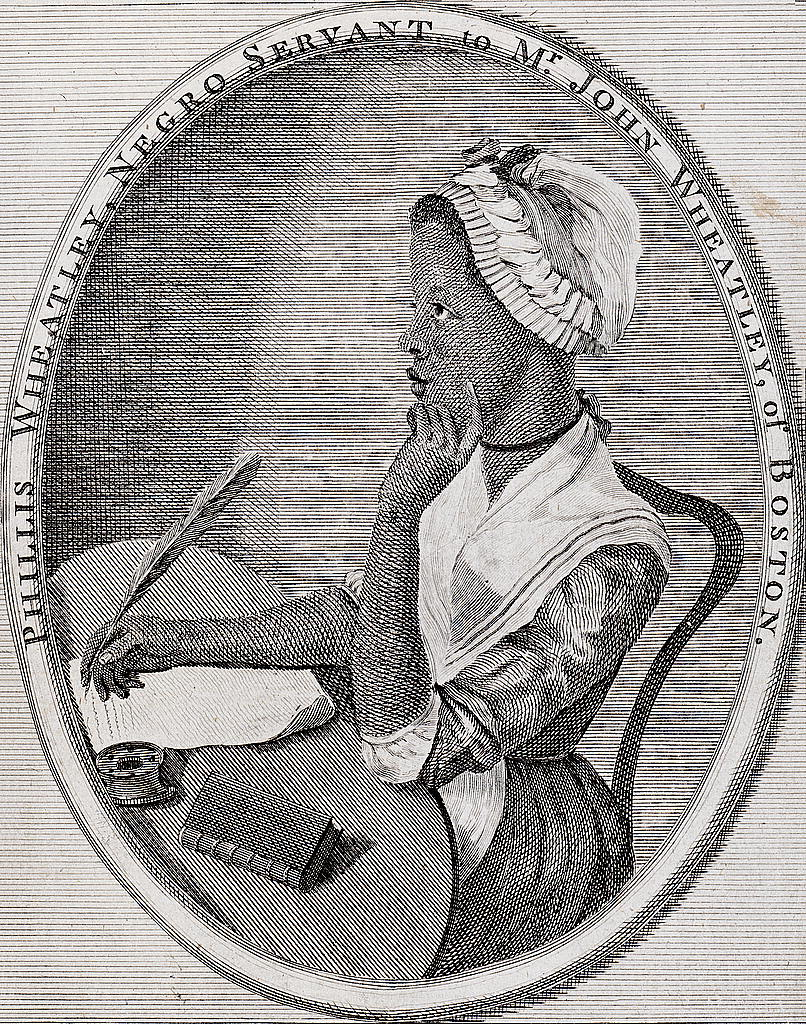
Phillis Wheatley

- Philip Waggenheim (1915–c. 1989) – gangster
- Ashley Wagner (born 1991) – figure skater
- Donnie Wahlberg (born 1969) – actor, singer, producer (New Kids on the Block)
- Mark Wahlberg (born 1971) – actor, rapper, producer, Boogie Nights, The Perfect Storm, The Departed, The Fighter
- David Walker (1796–1830) – abolitionist
- Jimmy Walker (1944–2007) – NBA All-Star
- Mike Wallace (1918–2012) – television journalist
- Marty Walsh (born 1967) – mayor of Boston
- Barbara Walters (1929–2022) – television journalist
- An Wang (1920–1990) – computer engineer and inventor, co-founder of Wang Laboratories
- Fiske Warren (1862–1938) – paper manufacturer and philanthropist
- Gretchen Osgood Warren (1868–1961) – poet and muse
- Joseph Warren (1741–1775) – founding father and Son of Liberty who died at the Battle of Bunker Hill
- Sam Waterston (born 1940) – actor
- Barrett Wilbert Weed (born 1988) – actress and singer
- Jack Welch (1935–2020) – businessman, CEO of General Electric
- Westbound Train – band
- Phillis Wheatley (c. 1753–1784) – poet and former slave
- Colin White (born 1997) – ice hockey player
- Eli Whitney (1765–1825) – inventor of the cotton gin
- Jermaine Wiggins (born 1975) – NFL player
- Alfred J. Wiggin (1823–1883) – painter and society portraitist
- Tony Williams (1945–1997) – jazz drummer
- Winter Williams (born 1984), actress
- Alan Wilson (1943–1970) – singer, guitarist (Canned Heat)
- Oren Elbridge Wilson (1844–1917) – mayor of Albany, New York, born in Boston
- Robert Scott Wilson (born 1987) – actor, first male model on The Price Is Right
- Clara Winthrop (1876–1969) – philanthropist, art collector
- Caroline Snowden Whitmarsh (1827-1898) - children's writer, science author & hymn compiler
- Danny Wood (born 1969) – singer (New Kids on the Block)
- Gene Wood (1925–2004) – game show announcer
- George Wood (1858–1924) – baseball player
- Brian Woods (born 1963) – documentary filmmaker
- Benjamin Edward Woolf (1836–1901) – British-born composer, playwright, journalist for Boston Saturday Evening Gazette and Boston Globe
- Steven Wright (born 1955) – Academy Award-winning comedian, actor and writer

== X ==
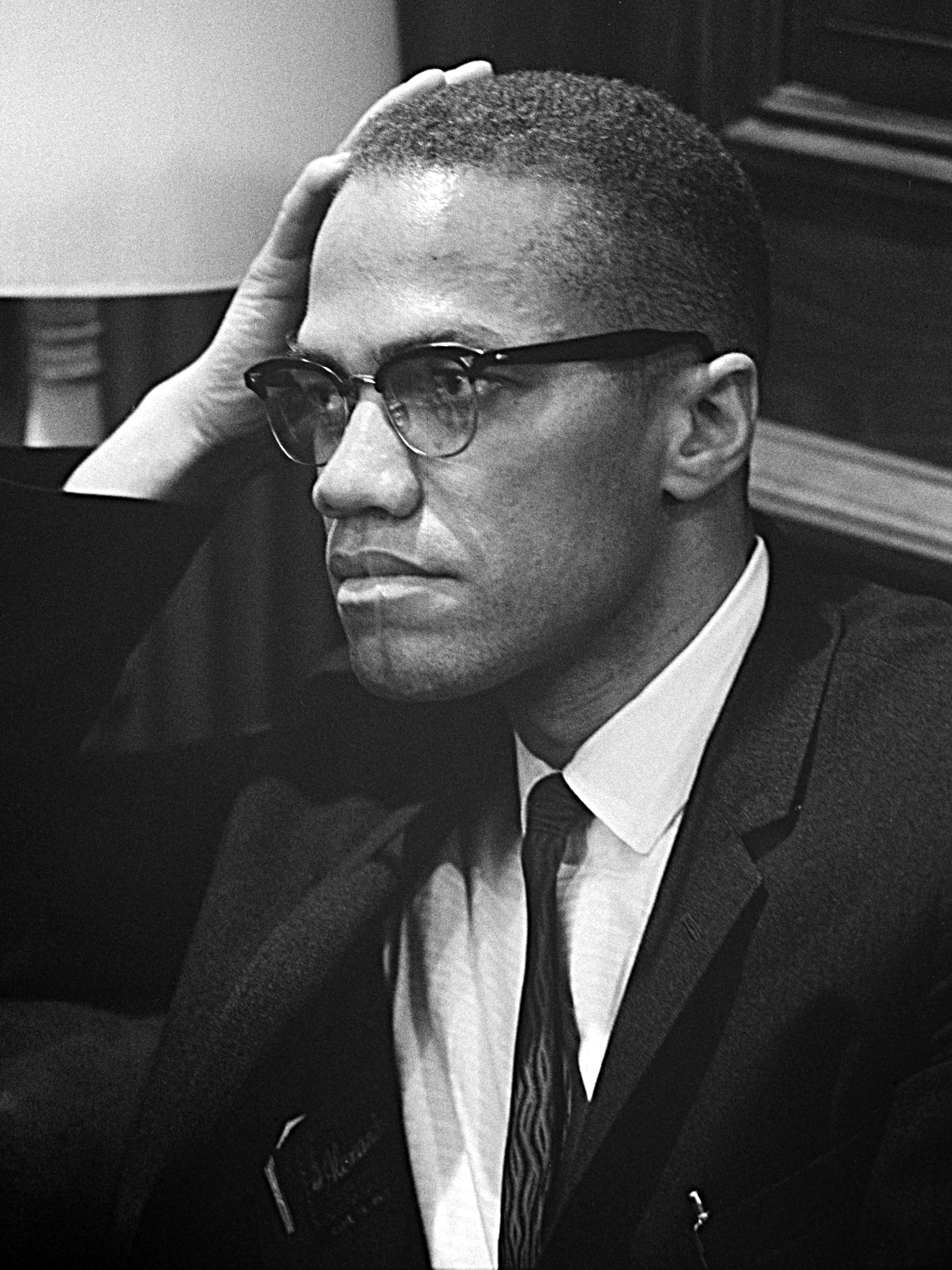
Malcolm X

- Malcolm X (1925–1965) – civil rights activist, Muslim minister (lived in Roxbury)

== Y ==
- Donnie Yen (born 1963) – Hong Kong actor, martial artist

== Z ==
- Rob Zombie (born 1965) – musician, director, producer
- Yekaterina Petrovna Zamolodchikova (born 1982) – drag queen
