= Andrew Henry =

Andrew Henry may refer to:

- Andrew Henry (VC) (1823–1870), English recipient of the Victoria Cross
- Andrew Henry (fur trader) (c. 1775–1832), American fur trader and co-founder of the Rocky Mountain Fur Company
- Andrew Mark Henry (born 1988/89), American scholar of religion
