= Paula Lodi =

U.S. Army General

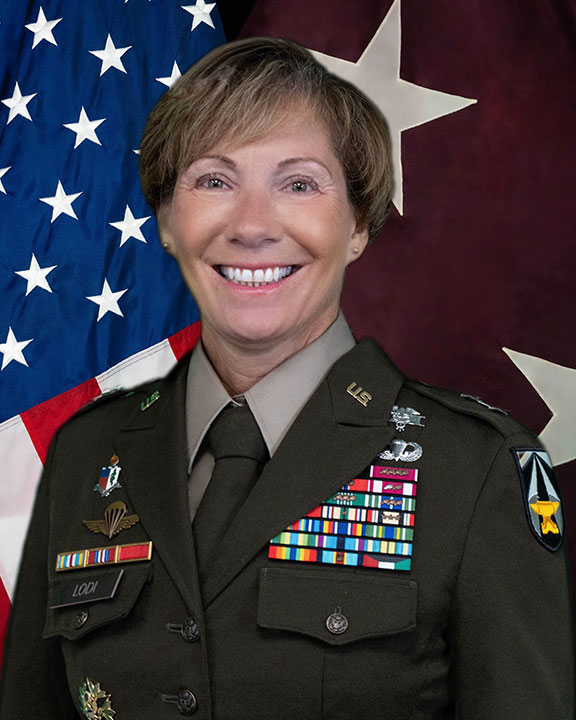
- Official portrait, 2024
- Alma mater: Rutgers University (BS); Troy University (MA); School of Advanced Military Studies (MS); Naval War College (MA)
- Relatives: Lieutenant General Maria Barrett (sister)
- Military career
- Allegiance: United States
- Branch: United States Army
- Service years: 1990–present
- Rank: Major General
- Unit: Medical Service Corps
- Commands: United States Army Medical Research and Development Command; 18th Medical Command (Deployment Support); 44th Medical Brigade; 14th Combat Support Hospital; 15th Sustainment Brigade Special Troops Battalion
- Conflicts: Gulf War; Iraq War
- Awards: Legion of Merit (5); Bronze Star Medal (3)

Paula C. Lodi is a United States Army major general who has served as commanding general of the United States Army Medical Research and Development Command since July 10, 2024. She served as commanding general of the 18th Medical Command (Deployment Support) from June 2022 to July 2024. She previously served as Deputy Commanding General for Support of the United States Army Medical Command from July 2021 to May 2022. Lodi was the first female commander of the 44th Medical Brigade. She is also the younger sister of Lieutenant General Maria Barrett. Lodi and Barrett are the United States Army's first ever sister General Officer tandem.

== Early and personal life ==
Lodi grew up in Franklin, Massachusetts, outside of Boston. She is the daughter of Ruston Lodi, an Italian immigrant, World War II veteran, Silver Star recipient, and school teacher; and Clara Lodi, an educator. Lodi has four siblings. Her elder sister, Maria Barrett, is a United States Army lieutenant general.

Lodi attended Rutgers University, graduating with a bachelor's degree. She also has a master's degrees in Public Administration, Military Arts and Science, and National Security and Strategic Studies.

== Military career ==
Lodi received a commission as a second lieutenant in the United States Army as a Distinguished Military Graduate of Rutgers University ROTC program and Medical Service Corps. She served with the Forward Support Battalions in the 3rd Infantry Division in Schweinfurt, Germany, and with 4th Infantry Division at Fort Hood, Texas. She has served as Ambulance Platoon Leader, Battalion S1 and S4, Support Ops Maintenance Officer, Brigade S4, and company commander. Lodi also served as Deputy Chief of Managed Care, Hospital Executive Officer at Darnall Army Medical Center, III Corps Plans Officer, Executive Officer for 21st Combat Support Hospital, Deputy Brigade Commander for 1st Medical Brigade, Operations Officer for the 18th MEDCOM DCS-OPS in Seoul, South Korea, and Chief, Military Personnel at William Beaumont Army Medical Center at Fort Bliss. At the Pentagon, Lodi served as the Executive Officer to the Director of the Army Staff.

Lodi has served in numerous command assignments, including of the 44th Medical Brigade, 15th Sustainment Brigade Special Troops Battalion, and 14th Combat Support Hospital. She was Chief and Leader of the Training Center at the AMEDD Center & School. She was also the Deputy Chief of Staff of Operations for the Office of the Surgeon General and United States Army Medical Command, as well as the Commanding General of the Regional Health Command in the Atlantic.

Lodi has graduated from the Command and General Staff College & School of Advanced Military Studies, and the Naval War College as a Distinguished Honor Graduate. She was promoted to brigadier general on June 2, 2019. She was nominated for promotion to major general on May 12, 2022, and the promotion took effect on February 3, 2023.

In February 2024, Lodi was assigned as commanding general of the United States Army Medical Research and Development Command.

== Awards ==
- Legion of Merit (4 Oak Leaf Clusters)
- Bronze Star Medal (2 Oak Leaf Clusters)
- Meritorious Service Medal (6 Oak Leaf Clusters)
- Humanitarian Service Medal
- Military Outstanding Volunteer Service Medal
- Expert Field Medical Badge
- Parachutist Badge

== Honors ==
- Recipient – Dr. Mary E. Walker and the St. Joan D’Arc Awards
- Official Order of Military Medical Merit (O2M3).
- "A" proficiency designator awarded by the Surgeon General.

Military offices
Preceded by Michael J. Talley	Commanding Officer of the 44th Medical Brigade; 2016–2018	Succeeded by Kimberlee A. Aiello
Preceded by Michael L. Place	Commanding General of Regional Health Command Atlantic; 2020–2021	Succeeded by Mary V. Krueger
Preceded by Michael L. Place	Commanding General of 18th Medical Command (Deployment Support); 2022–2024	Succeeded by E. Darrin Cox
Preceded by Edward H. Bailey	Commanding General of United States Army Medical Research and Development Command; 2024–present	Incumbent
