= Ryan Edell =

American professional baseball player

Uni-President 7-Eleven Lions
- Pitcher
- Born: July 6, 1983 (age 43); Boston, Massachusetts
- Bats: Left Throws: Left
- Stats at Baseball Reference

Teams
- Uni-President 7-Eleven Lions (2012–present)

Ryan David Edell (born July 6, 1983), is an American professional baseball player. A pitcher.

== Career ==
Edell attended Lexington High School, College of Charleston, and University of California, Irvine before being drafted by the Cleveland Indians. Since 2005, Edell has played in minor league baseball with the Mahoning Valley Scrappers, Lake County Captains, Kinston Indians, and Akron Aeros.

With the Akron Aeros in 2008, Edell pitched a career-high 144.1 innings.
