= Amy Upham Thomson McKean =

American pianist, composer

Amy Upham Thomson-McKean
- Born: Amy Thomson; 22 February 1893
- Died: 1972 (aged 78–79)
- Occupations: Pianist, songwriter, composer
- Parents: Ralph E. Thomson (father); Anna J. Thomson (mother)

Amy Upham Thomson-McKean (b. 22 February 1893 d. 1972) was an American pianist, songwriter and composer. Amy Thomson's father, Ralph E. emigrated from Glasgow in Scotland as a young man. Her mother was Anna J. Thomson and she had one brother Robert Stanley Thomson. She married Alexander Mathew McKean Sept. 17, 1917 at Lafayette Presbyterian Church, Brooklyn, and had a daughter, Elaine (May 4, 1924) and son, Robert Alexander (September 25, 1918).

Amy Thomson attended high school in Boston where she studied with Felix Fox at the Fox-Buonamici School of Pianoforte at 403 Marlborough Street. She began to write compositions, and studied with Bainbridge Christ and went on to publish songs and short works for violin and piano under both the names Amy Upham Thomson and Amy Thomson-McKean. Thomson-McKean appeared on concert and recital programs in Brooklyn in the 1910s - 1930s. She broadcast on Margaret Speaks on WOR NY in the 1920s.

Her papers are archived by her great-niece, artist Jamieson Thomas of Wilmington, DE.

== Selected works ==
- "The Throstle" (text by Tennyson)
- "A Day in June"
- "Liebislied"
- "Tone Poem"
- "Bolero"
- "Chason du Soir"
- "Little Boy Blue"
- "Forever"
- "Dream in Town"
- "At Sunset"
- "Four Leaf Clover"
- "The Night Has a Thousand Eyes"
- "Soul of Mine"
- "Memory"
- "Dream of Maytime"
- "June Rain"
- "In the Young World"
- "Love Song"
- "In Venice"
- "Prelude in C Minor"
- "Waltz in D Flat"
