= Caroline Snowden Whitmarsh =

- Born: June 1, 1827; Boston
- Died: August 6, 1898 (aged 71); Roxbury
- Spouse(s): James Guild

Caroline Snowden Whitmarsh Guild (June 1, 1827 – August 6, 1898) was an American writer.

Caroline Snowden Whitmarsh was born on June 1, 1827 in Boston. She was a student at the Ursuline convent school in Charlestown, Massachusetts during the Ursuline Convent riots in 1934.

She wrote a number of children's books, including fairy stories and a quartet of science books called The Summer-House Series illustrated by Hammatt Billings. She compiled a number of collections of hymns and other religious texts, some in conjunction with Anne E. Guild. Anne died in 1868, and in 1870 Whitmarsh married Anne's widower, James Guild.

Caroline Snowden Whitmarsh died on August 6, 1898 in Roxbury.

== Bibliography ==
- Violet, a Fairy Story. Boston, 1855.
- The Surprise, or Blanche and her Friends. (as Hetty Holyoke) Putnam, 1856.
- Daisy, or the Fairy Spectacles. Boston: Lee and Shepard, 1856.
- Never Mind the Face, or the Cousin's Visit (as Hetty Holyoke). New York, Scribner, 1857.
- Minnie, or the Little Woman. A Fairy Story. Boston, Lee & Shepard, 1857.
- The Sisters of Soleure: A Tale of the Sixteenth Century. Philadelphia: Parry and McMillan, 1857.
- Noisy Herbert. 1859.
- Nobody's Child. 1859.
- Hymns of the Ages (editor, with Anne E. Guild). 1859.
- Hymns for Mothers and Children. (editor) Boston, 1860.
- Sunday Lessons for Children. Boston, 1864.
- Lessons on the Christian Life (For Older Classes). Boston: W.V. Spencer, 1868.
- Prayers of the Ages (editor). Boston: Ticknor and Field, 1868.
- Hymns and Rhymes for Home and School (editor). Nichols and Hall, 1875.

=== The Summer House series ===
- Our Summer-House, and What Was Said and Done In It. Boston: Brown, Taggard, and Chase 1859.
- Older than Adam. 1861.
- Aunt Annie's Rainy-Day Stores. 1864.
- Lives of Familiar Insects. Boston: Taggard and Thompson, 1864.
- Wings and Webs. Boston: Taggard and Thompson, 1864.
