= 14th Combat Support Hospital =

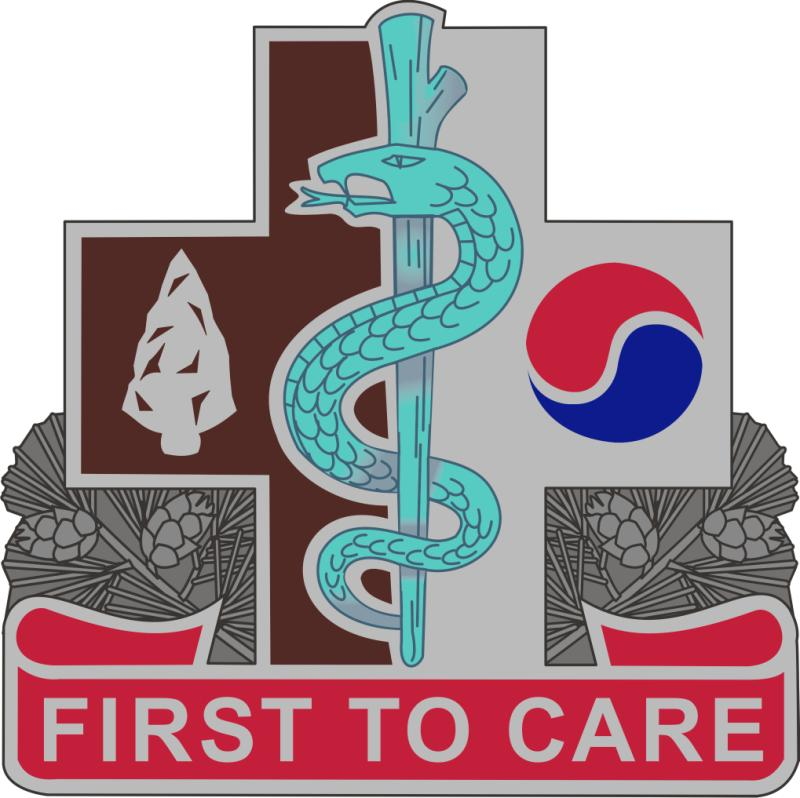
- Distinctive unit insignia
- Active: 1942–1946; 1950–1954; 1954–1968; 1996–Present
- Country: United States
- Branch: United States Army
- Type: Combat support hospital
- Part of: 44th Medical Brigade
- Garrison/HQ: Fort Stewart, GA
- Motto: First to Care
- Engagements: World War II; Korean War; War in Afghanistan
- Website: http://www.benning.army.mil/tenant/14thCSH/

Commanders
- Colonel: Rachele M. Smith

The 14th Combat Support Hospital (14th CSH) is a combat support hospital of the United States Army. It participated in World War II, the Korean War and, more recently, deployed to Afghanistan. The hospital was involved in relief operations following Hurricane Katrina. The unit currently falls under the command of the 44th Medical Brigade and is based at Fort Benning, GA, and relocating to Fort Stewart, GA during FY 2020.

== Mission ==
"Organize, train, and deploy tailored forces to provide health service support to joint and/or coalition forces engaged in decisive action and contingency operations. Be prepared to assume Medical Task Force mission command and conduct split based operations as required."

== History ==
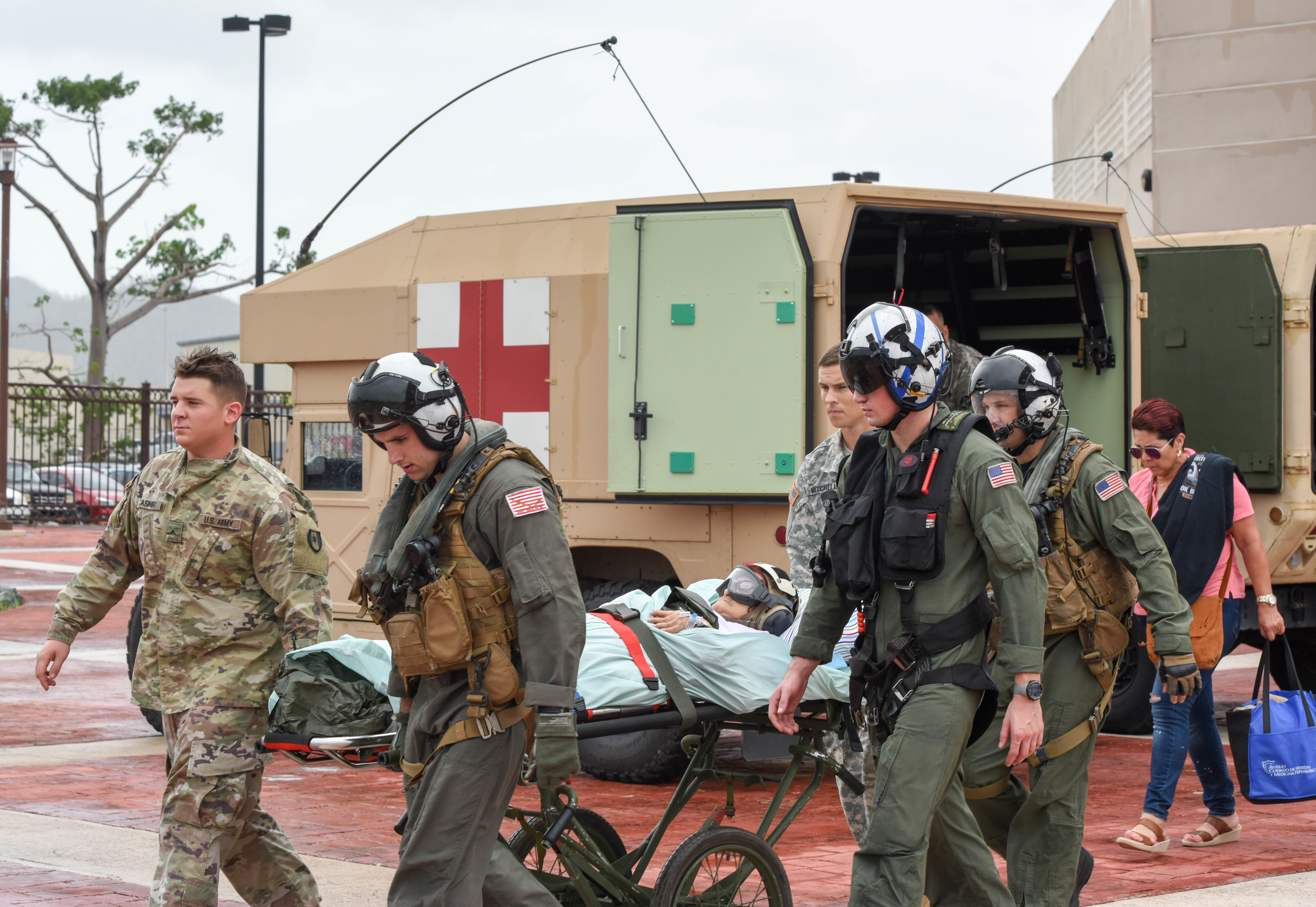
The 14th CSH transfers a patient to the USNS Comfort from Humacao, Puerto Rico, 18 October 2017

The 14th Combat Support Hospital was originally constituted on 23 June 1942 in the United States Army as the 14th Field Hospital. It was activated 25 July 1942 at Camp Bowie, Texas and inactivated 25 March 1946 in Germany. It was again activated 13 November 1950 in Korea and was allocated to the Army 31 October 1951. It in activated 1 February 1954 in Korea and was activated in December of that year in Germany. It inactivated in Germany on 15 April 1968 and was not activated again until 6 October 1996 at Fort Benning, Georgia. On 21 June 2004 the 14th Field Hospital was re-designated as the 14th Combat Support Hospital in Fort Benning, Georgia.

The 14th Combat Support Hospital has participated in World War II in the Aleutian Islands, Rhineland, and Central Europe. The 14th also served with pride in the Korean War. Unit decorations include; two Meritorious Unit Commendations (Embroidered) and one Republic of Korea Presidential Unit Citation (Embroidered). In September 2005, the 14th Combat Support Hospital deployed to New Orleans, Louisiana in support of Hurricane Katrina relief efforts. In January 2006, the 14th Combat Support Hospital deployed to Afghanistan in support of Combined Joint Task Force-76 and the International Security Assistance Force- Afghanistan (ISAF) during Operation Enduring Freedom VII. In July 2009, the 14th Combat Support Hospital deployed to Iraq in support of Operation Iraqi Freedom working under Joint Task Force134 performing the Detainee Healthcare Mission. The 14th Combat Support Hospital was then realigned from 44th Medical Brigade to the 1st Medical Brigade on 27 January 2011 and then realigned back to 44th Medical Brigade on 16 May 2012. In September 2012, the 14th Combat Support Hospital once again deployed to Afghanistan in support of International Security Assistance Force- Afghanistan (ISAF) as TF 14th MED, a multifunction medical task force responsible for healthcare throughout Afghanistan, a first for a Combat Support Hospital.

In June 2014, the 14th CSH assumed a Severe Weather Response Force mission.

In October 2017, the 14th CSH provided aid to Puerto Rico as relief effort after Hurricane Maria devastated the island.

== Decorations ==
Unit decorations include: four Meritorious Unit Commendations (Embroidered) and two Republic of Korea Presidential Unit Citations (Embroidered).

== Subordinate Units ==
The following units are attached to the 14th CSH:

- Headquarters and Headquarters Detachment (HHD)

Provides Command and Control, personnel, administrative, logistical and maintenance support to CSH units and direct reporting units (DRUs). On order, provides command and control, and administrative support to the 14th CSH and DRUs deployed in support of worldwide contingency and full spectrum operations.

- A Company
- B Company

Deploys to a joint/combined operational area and provides flexible, responsive, and effective Level III Health Service Support and Force Health Protection to supported forces conducting full spectrum operations and/or contingency operations. On order, redeploys.

- 19th Optometry (Disbanded)

Provides comprehensive optometry care and optical fabrication support to joint and/or coalition forces engaged in decisive and contingency operations. Be prepared to conduct split-based operations in order to provide optometry capabilities on an area support basis.

- 463rd Veterinary Services (Disbanded)

Provides veterinary services and medical support in the areas of approving commercial food sources, food safety/security/sanitation, government owned animal health care, preventive medicine directed towards endemic Zoonotic diseases, food service sanitation, and foreign animal disease surveillance/mitigation, and humanitarian civic action programs in support of all branches of the services throughout the area of operations.

- 690th Ground Ambulance (Realigned to 261st Multifunctional Medical Battalion)

Deploys and provides ground medical evacuation capabilities in support of joint and/or coalition forces engaged in decisive action and global contingency operations. Be prepared to make ground medical evacuation capabilities available for operations in direct support of defense support to civil authorities (DSCA).

- 926th Preventive Medicine

Provides complete theater of operations preventive medicine support to minimize the medical and environmental threats to supported forces and civilians in evolving operations ranging from major regional conflicts to humanitarian and disaster relief. Provides preventive medicine and technical consultation in Unified Land Operations
