= Maria Barrett =

U.S. Army general

Maria B. Barrett
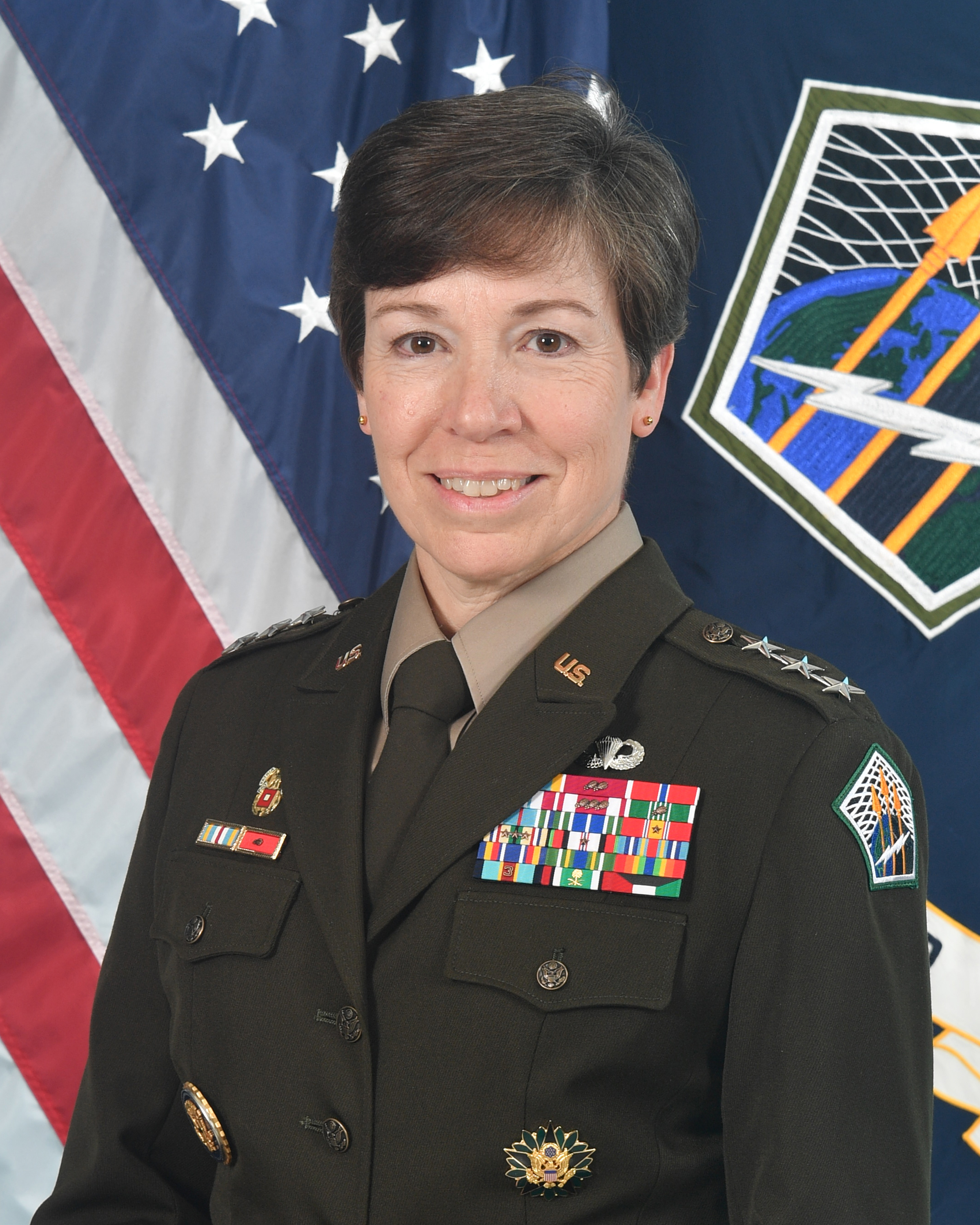
- Official portrait, 2022
- Relatives: Major General Paula Lodi (sister)
- Military career
- Allegiance: United States
- Branch: United States Army
- Service years: 1988–2025
- Rank: Lieutenant General
- Commands: United States Army Cyber Command; Army Network Enterprise Technology Command; 160th Signal Brigade
- Conflicts: Gulf War; War in Afghanistan
- Awards: Army Distinguished Service Medal; Defense Superior Service Medal; Legion of Merit (3); Bronze Star Medal

Maria B. Barrett is a United States Army Lieutenant General who served as the Commander of United States Army Cyber Command (ARCYBER) from 3 May 2022 to 4 December 2025. She most recently served as Commanding General of the Network Enterprise Technology Command in Fort Huachuca, Arizona. She is the elder sister of Major General Paula Lodi. Barrett and Lodi are the U.S. Army's first ever sister General Officer tandem.

== Early life ==
Barrett grew up in Franklin, Massachusetts, outside of Boston. She is the daughter of Ruston Lodi, an Italian immigrant, World War II veteran, Silver Star recipient, and school teacher; and Clara Lodi, an educator.

== Military career ==
Barrett received a commission in the United States Army as a Second Lieutenant through the Army ROTC program in 1988. She is a veteran of Operation New Dawn, Enduring Freedom and Operation Desert Shield/Desert Storm. Barrett was promoted to Brigadier General on 2 December 2015, and to Major General on 2 August 2018.

== Personal life ==
Barrett is married to retired Lieutenant Colonel Brian T. Barrett, a former Signal Corps Officer. She has four siblings. Her younger sister, Paula Lodi, is a United States Army Major General.

== Awards and commendations ==
- Army Distinguished Service Medal
- Defense Superior Service Medal
- Legion of Merit
- Bronze Star Medal
- Defense Meritorious Service Medal with one oak leaf cluster
- Meritorious Service Medal with three oak leaf clusters
- Army Commendation Medal with one oak leaf cluster
- Joint Service Achievement Medal
- Army Achievement Medal
- Joint Meritorious Unit Award
- Signal Regiment's Bronze Order of Mercury.

Military offices
Preceded by John W. Baker	Commanding General of the Army Network Enterprise Technology Command; 2018–2022	Succeeded by Christopher L. Eubank
Preceded by Stephen G. Fogarty	Commanding General of the United States Army Cyber Command; 2022–2025	Succeeded by Christopher L. Eubank
