= Keytar Bear =

Busker from Boston Massachusetts

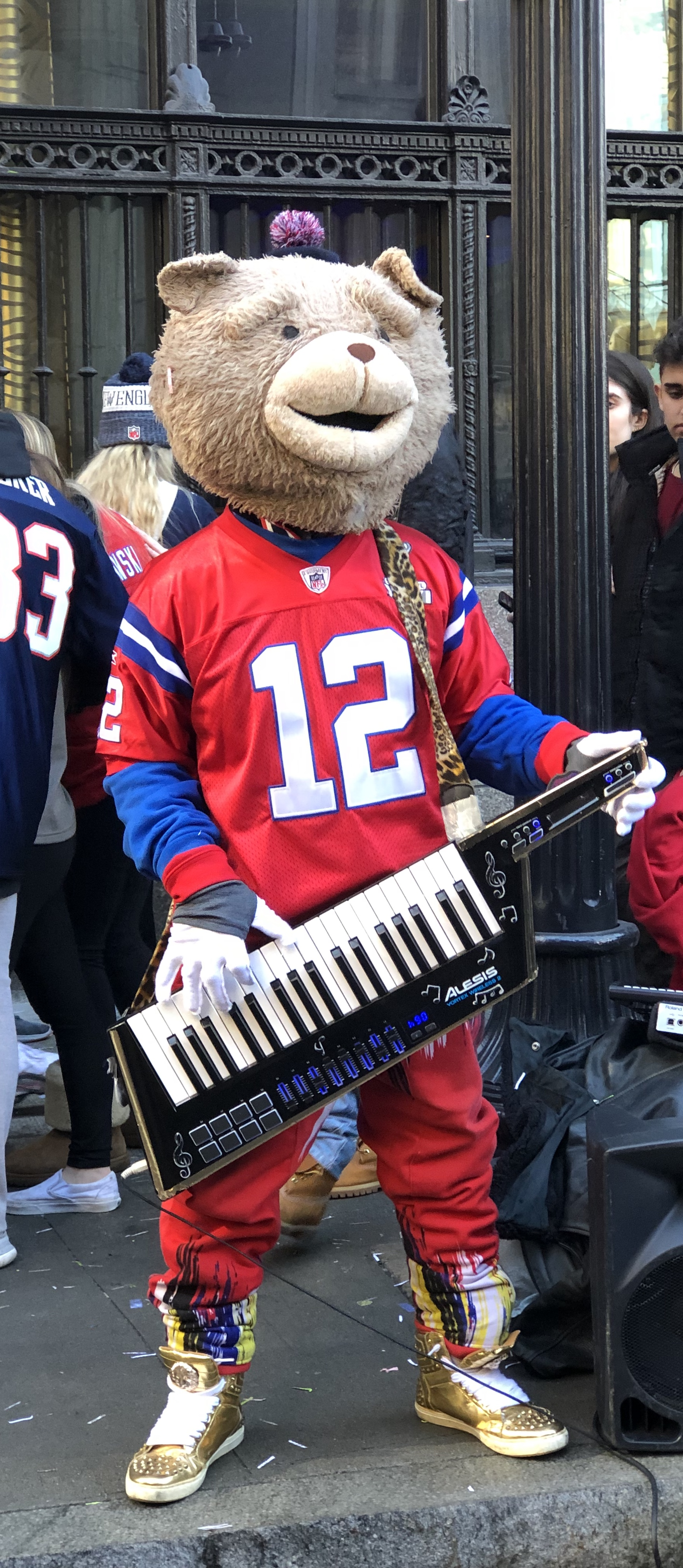
- Keytar Bear at the Patriots Super Bowl LIII Victory Parade near Government Center

Background information
- Origin: Boston, Massachusetts, United States
- Genres: Various
- Occupations: Musician, teacher
- Instrument: Keytar
- Years active: 2011–present

Keytar Bear is the name given to a busker from Boston, Massachusetts. The nickname "Keytar Bear" was given as he wears a bear outfit and plays a keytar in his performances, usually near subway and train stops. Little is known about the busker other than small bits of his life, as the performer in the suit prefers to remain anonymous. Keytar Bear has been involved in several unprovoked attacks by "drunks and youths" over the years prompting public displays of support.

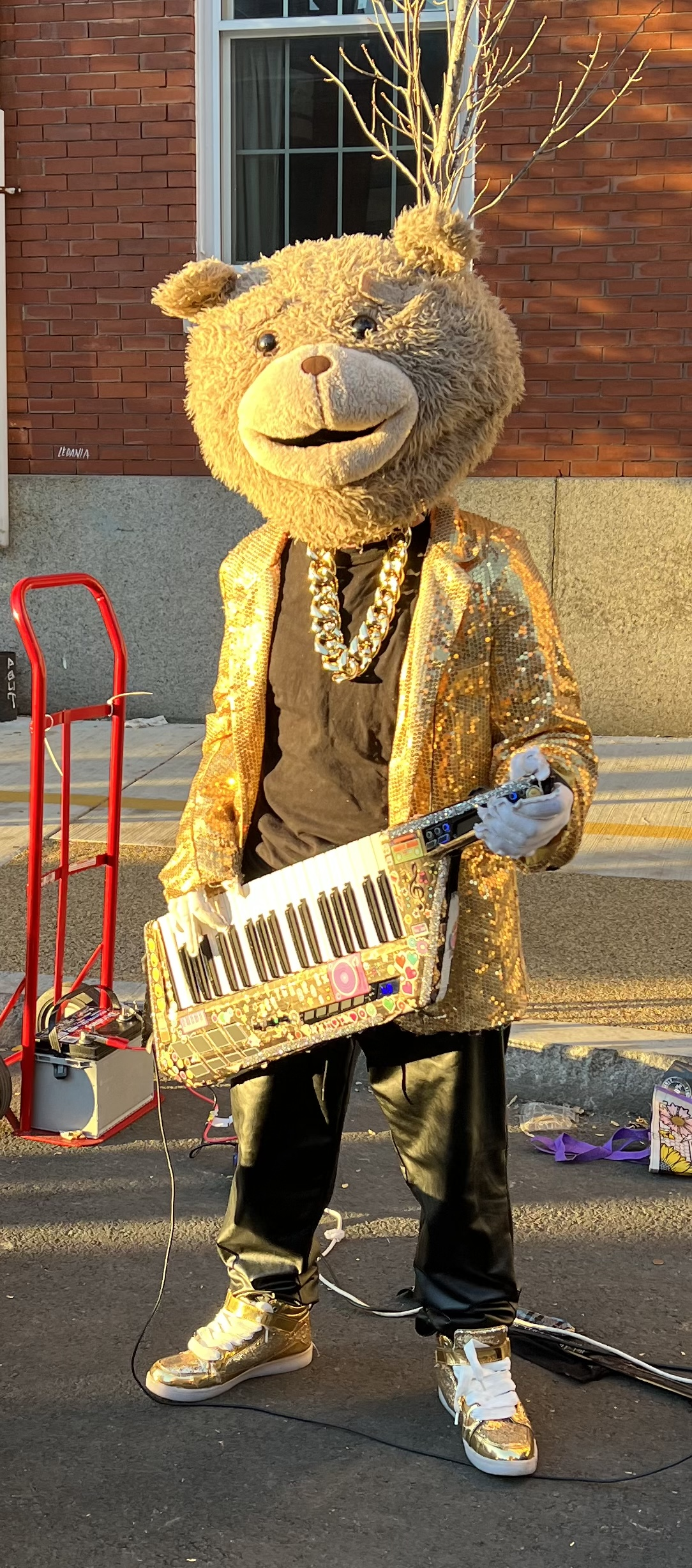
Keytar Bear setting up in Salem, Massachusetts two days before Halloween 2022

== Biography ==
Little is known about Keytar Bear's identity as he is emphatic that his real name not be used in any given context. In an interview done in with Vice News in 2018, he would only state that he was "somewhere in his 20s and 30s". As of 2022, he has stated his name is Zeus. Keytar Bear though has been open about some of his life saying that he was interested in music since he was a kid, and was homeschooled by his grandmother in Sutton, Massachusetts. Keytar Bear also mentioned that he is biracial, but has never met his dad who was in the military. He also mentioned that he was inspired by a real-life bear in the form of a mother bear and her cub that would visit his grandmother's backyard. It was also revealed by The Boston Globe that he is a music and hip-hop dance teacher.

== History ==
Keytar Bear started performing in 2011 after buying a bear costume from the movie Ted for Halloween. When asked why he decided to start performing in a bear costume, he stated that he wants to "kill" racism. He went on to say; "You don’t know if [I’m] black or white, you just see a little bear.

In 2014 Cambridge declared May 8 to be "Keytar Bear and Abigail Taylor Day" after a successful performance for charity. Mick Jagger said on his Facebook page that he is a fan of the bear, and posted a video of him performing "a cuddly cover of Start Me Up".

On June 12, 2018, Trillium Brewing Company released a beer called the Keytar Bear Double IPA to honor the Boston busker. Part of the proceeds from the sales of the beer went to help the performer after a motorcycle crash in the spring. While initially he did not think he would be able to perform in the summer, the performer was seen out and about (with crutches) after the release of the beer.

== Incidents ==
Keytar Bear has been subjected to multiple attacks involving robbery and battery. In November 2014, he was beaten and robbed near Faneuil Hall, which led to the arrest of two people. The attack left his keytar broken, but it was later replaced through donations.

A fourth attack occurred on June 17, 2017, when three teenagers from New Hampshire beat and robbed the performer, which again damaged his equipment. The teenagers were arrested shortly afterwards, and an online fundraising page raised $9,500 to help Keytar Bear with his losses.
