= Evelyn Parnell =

American opera singer

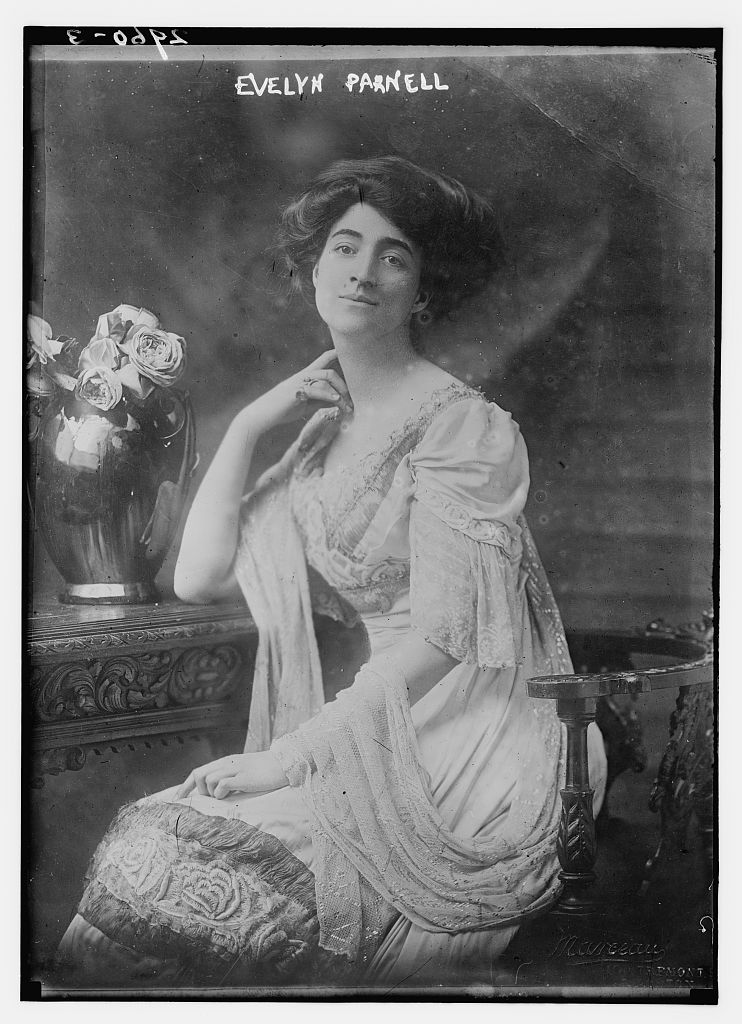
Parnell circa 1914

Evelyn Parnell (August 21, 1888 – October 9, 1939) was an American operatic soprano.

== Biography ==
Parnell was born in 1888 in Boston, Massachusetts, to George A. Parnell of Bristol, England. She was a relative of the Irish nationalist political leader Charles Stewart Parnell. She studied singing with Madame Meysenheim of New York City and during her late teenage years became known as a talented church singer in Boston.

In 1908, at the age of 20, Parnell joined the newly formed Boston Opera Company and performed with them during their very first season. She then went abroad and performed in operas in Milan, Pavia, and Venice. She later toured Australia, Ireland and performed extensively in the United States and Canada.

She died on October 9, 1939, at the Stuyvesant Polyclinic Hospital in New York City following an appendectomy at the age of 51.
