= Molly Birnbaum =

American writer

- Born: 1982 (age 43–44); Boston, Massachusetts

Molly Birnbaum (born 1982) is a writer. Her work has appeared in The New York Times, ARTnews magazine, the New York Post, USA Today, the Point Reyes Light newspaper, and The Brown Alumni Magazine. She has won the Pulitzer Traveling Fellowship for Art and Culture from Columbia University in 2008. She was born and raised in Boston, attended Brown University, where she studied the History of Art and Architecture. She then became interested in cooking. Her first job was as a dish washer working for Tony Maws at his Cambridge, MA restaurant, Craigie Street Bistrot; it is now called Craigie on Main. She was accepted into the Culinary Institute of America, but did not attend after an automobile accident in August 2005 that occurred while she was jogging in Brookline, MA; the accident caused her to lose her ability to smell. She wrote a book about her experience dealing with her loss of smell titled "Season to Taste: How I lost My sense of Smell and Found My Way." She writes the blog "My Madeleine".
