= Philip Waggenheim =

American mobster

Philip "Phil" Wagenheim (February 2, 1915 – April 1989) was a Boston mobster and a close associate of Ilario "Larry Baione" Zannino and Whitey Bulger. Based in the neighborhood of Jamaica Plain, he was a key contact between the New York and Boston underworld between the 1960s until his death from natural causes in April 1989.

In November 1966, he was present at Ralph Lamattina's Nite Lite Café with Joseph Lamattina and Larry Biona when two members of Joe "the Animal" Barboza's "crew", Tash Bratsos and Tommy DePrisco, were murdered. (The two had previously been extorting money from local residents to raise bail for Barboza.)
