= Andrew Mark Henry =

American scholar of religion (born 1988/89)

Andrew Henry
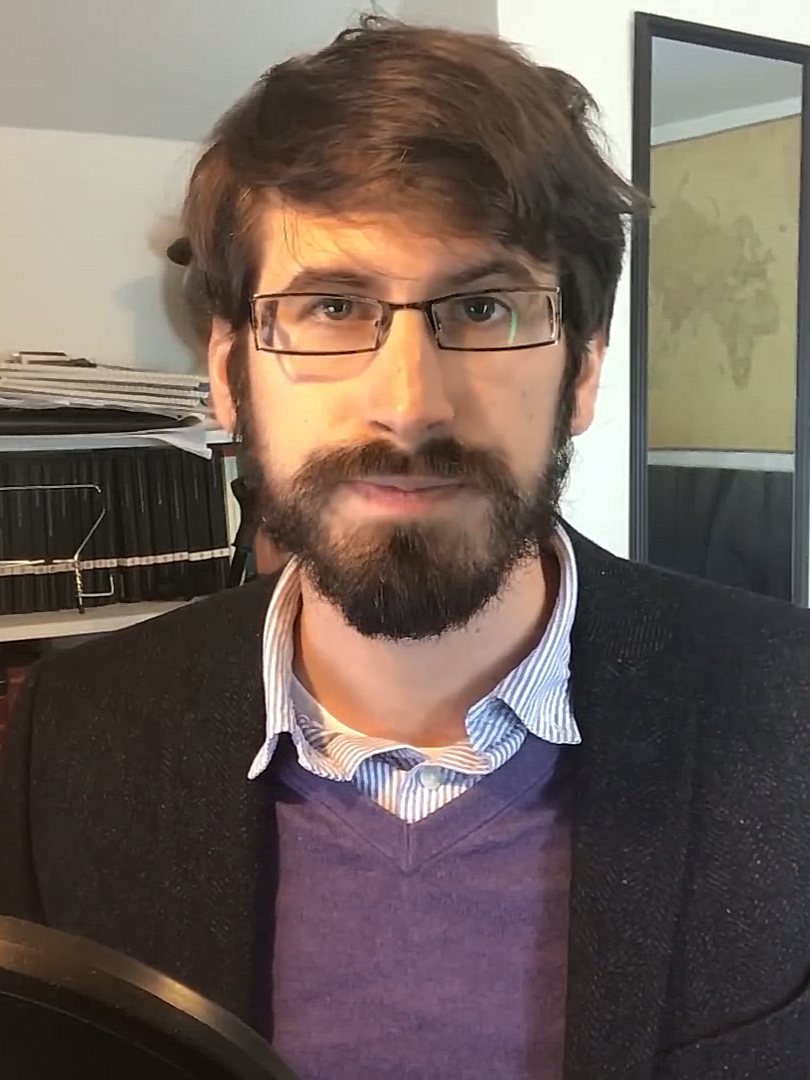
- Henry in 2018
- Born: 1988 or 1989 (age 36–37)

Academic background
- Education: Messiah University (BA); Boston University (PhD)
- Thesis: The Magic of Crowd Acclamations and the Cult of Amulets in Late Antiquity (2020)

Academic work
- Discipline: Religious studies
- Sub-discipline: Early Christianity
- Main interests: Early Christianity, Contemporary religion, Contemporary Christian practice, Diachronic religion and religious change, Anthropology

YouTube information
- Channel: ReligionForBreakfast
- Years active: 2014–present
- Subscribers: 1.12 million
- Views: 139.5 million
- Last updated: 6 December, 2025
- Website: www.religionforbreakfast.com

Andrew Mark Henry (born 1988 or 1989) is an American scholar of religion who hosts the YouTube channel Religion for Breakfast, which provides videos explaining religion from an academic perspective. Henry started the channel in 2014 while studying for a PhD in religious studies at Boston University, which he completed in 2020. The channel covers a diverse array of topics relating to religion, with the intent of providing nonsectarian educational content to the general public. Henry has also worked at The Atlantic as a manager of a forum and its YouTube channel.

== Education ==
Prior to 2012, Andrew Mark Henry was a graduate of history from Messiah College (now Messiah University) and attended a postbaccalaureate program in classical languages of University of Pennsylvania. In 2012, he began studying for a PhD in religious studies at Boston University (BU), specializing in early Christianity. While at BU, he was a teaching assistant for Stephen Prothero, a professor of religion and popular author, and studied abroad in Jerusalem as a research fellow at the Albright Institute of Archaeological Research. He completed his PhD program in August 2020, with his dissertation on "The Magic of Crowd Acclamations and the Cult of Amulets in Late Antiquity."

== Religion for Breakfast ==
Religion for Breakfast is a YouTube channel which provides videos of Henry explaining religious topics from an academic perspective, without the intent to proselytize for any particular faith. The channel seeks to improve religious literacy among the general public, with a wide area of topics including Christianity, Islam, Buddhism, Shinto, and other religions. His videos often feature Henry traveling to locations and interviews with experts relating to the subject at hand.

Originally a blog, Henry later started the YouTube channel in 2014 due to a perceived lack of informative content on the video platform. He said in 2021 that the name of the channel was inspired by a band name generator. Beginning in 2016 he began uploading videos in earnest, and reached 110,000 subscribers by February 2020.

=== Reception ===
Commenting on the channel, Prothero said that Henry had done a "great job." In the 2022 book Religious Diversity in Europe, Religion for Breakfast was said to "provide interesting content on questions of religion and religious coexistence." David Callaway of the Freedom Forum said the channel may serve as an example to public schools in the United States on how to cover religious topics "in an academic and constitutional way." Henry himself has said that he often receives backlash in YouTube comments accusing him of performing either religious apologetics or criticism of religion.

== Other careers ==
Henry has worked at The Atlantic as a manager of its associated YouTube channel and an online forum on the website.

== Personal life ==
Henry hails from Boston, Massachusetts, in the United States. He was born in 1988 or 1989.

== Selected works ==
- Henry, Andrew Mark (2016-12-01). "Apotropaic Autographs: Orality and Materiality in the Abgar-Jesus Inscriptions". Archiv für Religionsgeschichte. 17 (1): 165–186. doi:10.1515/arege-2015-0010. ISSN 1868-8888.
- Henry, Andrew (2017-10-02). "Magic in the Ancient World". Material Religion. 13 (4): 549–551. doi:10.1080/17432200.2017.1377449. ISSN 1743-2200.
- Henry, Andrew Mark (2020). The Magic of Crowd Acclamations and the Cult of Amulets in Late Antiquity (PhD thesis). Boston University.
- Henry, Andrew M. (2021-01-02). "Religious Literacy in Social Media: A Need for Strategic Amplification". Religion & Education. 48 (1): 89–101. doi:10.1080/15507394.2021.1876507. ISSN 1550-7394.
