= Franklin Common Historic District =

Historic district in Massachusetts, United States

- U.S. National Register of Historic Places
- U.S. Historic district
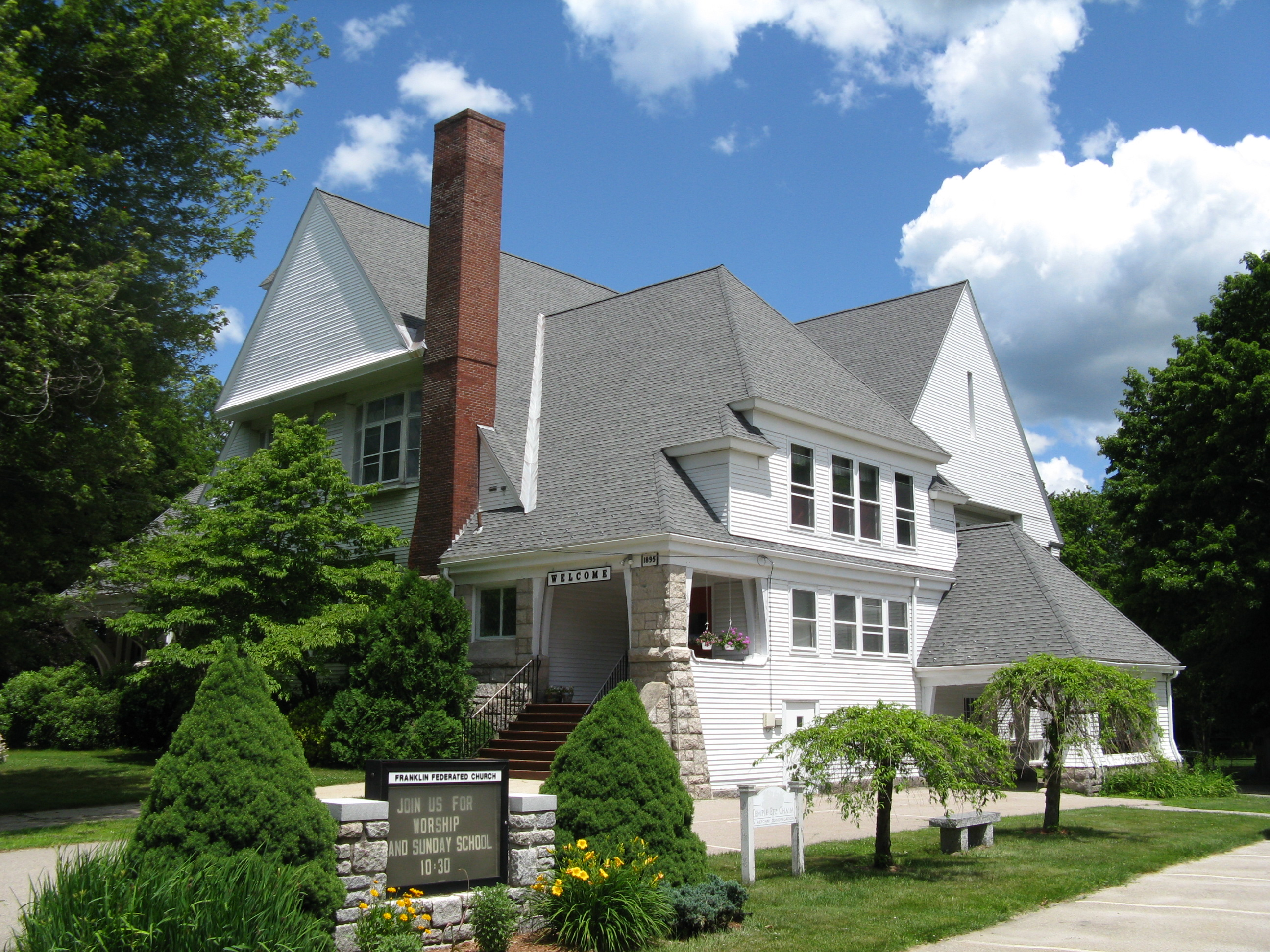
- Franklin Federated Church

- Location within Massachusetts Location within the United States
- Location: Franklin, Massachusetts
- Coordinates: 42°5′19″N 71°24′5″W
- Area: 35 acres (14 ha)
- Built: 1787
- Architect: Paine, Walter J.; Sullivan, Matthew
- Architectural style: Federal, Greek Revival
- NRHP reference No.: 05000218
- Added to NRHP: March 31, 2005

The Franklin Common Historic District is a historic district encompassing the traditional village center of Franklin, Massachusetts. The primary focus of the district is the town common, a roughly triangular green which took shape in the mid-18th century. The district includes the buildings that abut the green, and extends northward along Main Street to its junction with Lincoln Street, where the Red Brick School is located. The Dean Junior College Historic District abuts this district to the south. The district is predominantly residential in character, with several civic and religious institutional buildings facing the common. The latter group are dominated by the Federated Church (Shingle style, built 1895), and the Roman Catholic St. Mary's Church complex, which includes three buildings from the 1920s to 1955.

The district was listed on the National Register of Historic Places in 2005.

== See also ==
- National Register of Historic Places listings in Norfolk County, Massachusetts
