= Redbrick (disambiguation) =

A redbrick is one of the six civic British universities founded in England that achieved university status before World War I.

Redbrick may also refer to:

- Red brick, a block of ceramic material used in masonry construction
- "Red bricks", special items in the Lego Star Wars video games
- Red Brick School (disambiguation), multiple schools
- Redbrick (newspaper), the student newspaper of the University of Birmingham
- RedBrick Limited, a game publisher

== See also ==
- Brick red
