= Baran (name) =

Baran (باران, pronounced /bɒːɾɒːn/) is a feminine given name, meaning "rain" in all Iranian languages. It is also a surname used in Turkish, Kurdish, and Slavic.

== Surname ==
- Arkadiusz Baran (born 1979), Polish footballer, brother of Grzegorz
- Bernard Baran (1965–2014), American child care worker convicted and later exonerated of sex abuse
- Grzegorz Baran (born 1982), Polish footballer
- Hanna Arsenych-Baran (1970–2021), Ukrainian prose writer, novelist and poet
- İbrahim Halil Baran (born 1981), Kurdish poet, politician, writer, and designer
- İlhan Baran (1934–2016), Turkish composer
- Martin Baran (born 1988), Slovak football player
- Martyna Baran (born 2001), Polish speed skater
- Paul Baran (1926–2011), American inventor of packet switching
- Paul A. Baran (1909–1964), American economist
- Phil S. Baran (born 1977), American chemist
- Radosław Baran (born 1989), Polish wrestler
- Robert Baran (born 1992), Polish wrestler
- Serhat Baran (born 1974), Kurdish ethno-rock musician
- Stanisław Baran (1920–1993), Polish football player
- Witold Baran (1939–2020), Polish middle-distance runner
- Zeyno Baran (born 1972), Turkish-born American scholar and journalist

== Given name ==
=== First name ===
- Baran Kosari (born 1985), Iranian actress
- Baran Mogultay (born 2004), German football player
- Baran bo Odar (born 1978), German film and TV director and screenwriter
- Baran Süzer, Turkish businessman
- Baran Bölükbaşı, Turkish Actor

=== Middle name ===
- Sezgin Baran Korkmaz (born 1977), Turkish businessman

== See also ==
- Beran (surname), Czech variant of the surname
