= Franklin Library =

Franklin Library may refer to:

- The Franklin Library, a book publishing part of the Franklin Mint
- Franklin Library (Minneapolis), a public library on Franklin Avenue in Minneapolis, Minnesota, United States
- Franklin Public Library (Massachusetts), the oldest public library in existence in the United States
