= Oliver Dean =

Founder of Dean College (1783–1871)

- Born: February 18, 1783; Franklin, Massachusetts, U.S.
- Died: December 5, 1871 (aged 88); Franklin, Massachusetts, U.S.
- Occupations: Physician, businessman
- Known for: Founding Dean College
- Spouses: Caroline Francoeur (m. 1811; died 1866) Louisa C. Hawes (m. 1868)

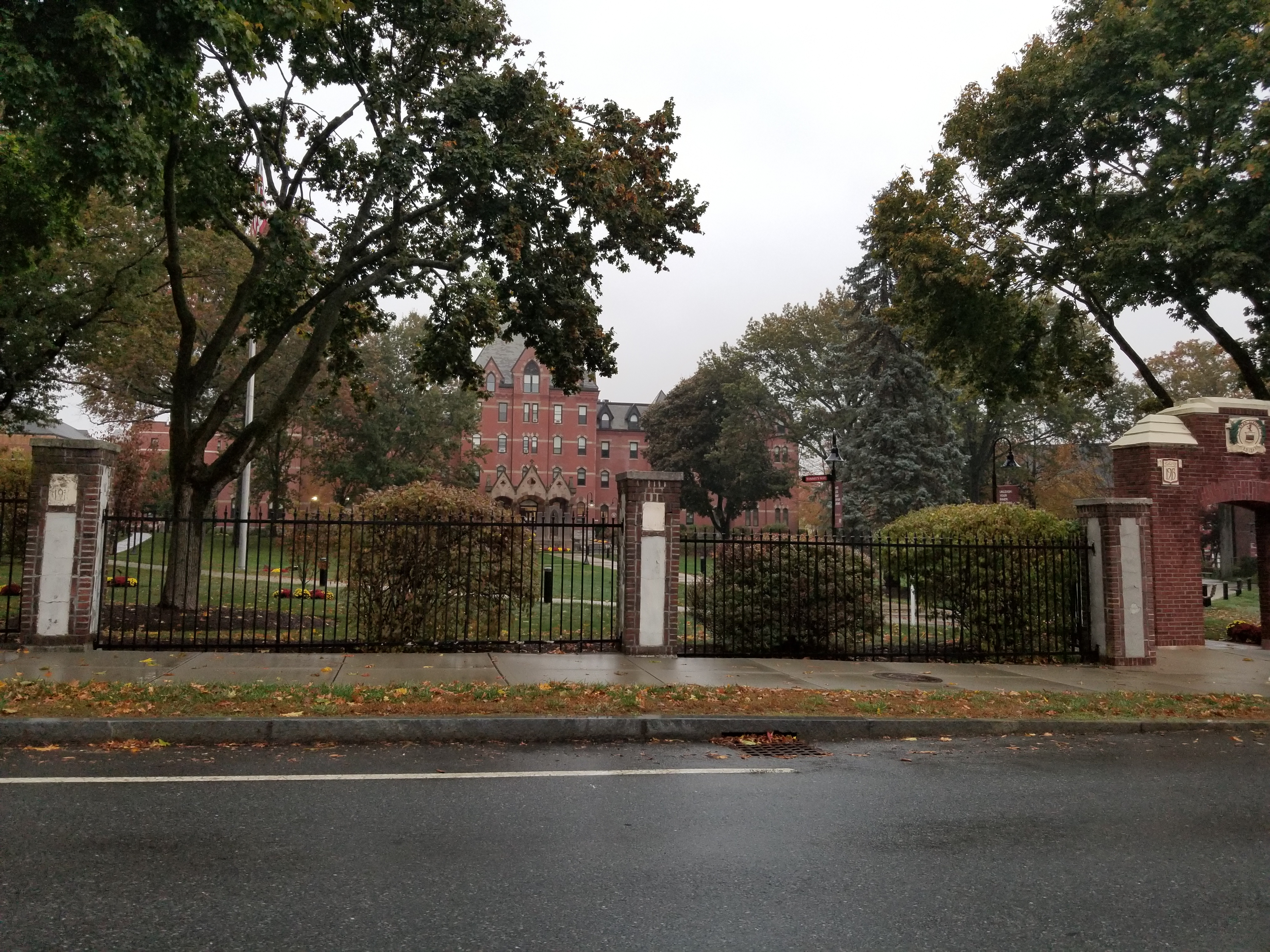
Dean College in Franklin

Oliver Dean (1783–1871) was an American medical doctor, businessman, and philanthropist who became the founder and namesake of Dean College in Franklin, Massachusetts.

== Early life and career ==
Dean was born in Franklin on February 18, 1783, to Seth and Edena Pond Dean. He became a medical doctor and then changed careers and became manager of the Amoskeag Manufacturing Company in Manchester, New Hampshire. Dean had founded a Universalist church in Manchester and was also instrumental in the growth of Universalism in Franklin after returning there. In May 1860, he was elected as president of Tufts College, founded in 1852 by universalists, and was re-elected in 1861. Dean helped establish and was the first president of the Franklin Library Association, to support Franklin Public Library, the first and oldest continually used public lending library in the U.S.

In 1865, Dean founded the co-educational Dean Academy with donations of about $125,000 and approximately 9 acres (3.6 ha) of land for the school. The land Dean donated had previously belonged to well-known theologian Nathanael Emmons. Ground was broken in August 1866, the cornerstone laid in May 1867, and the building dedicated in May 1868. When eight Emmons family graves were relocated to a nearby cemetery in June 1870, Dean paid half of the cost.

== Personal life ==
Dean married Caroline Francoeur of Wrentham in 1811 and she died in 1866. He married Louisa C. Hawes, also of Wrentham, in 1868. She returned to Wrentham after his death and died there on March 16, 1902.

When Dean was studying medicine with local doctor James Mann, he was seeing Nathanael Emmons' daughter, Deliverance, whom he called Delia. On learning of her father's great dislike for him and for Mann, Dean discontinued the relationship. He later wrote, however, "Delia Emmons was the one woman in the world for me, and life would have been to me a widely different thing if I had married her. I ought to have married Delia Emmons." She had died of consumption in 1813, two years after Dean married Francoeur.

== Death and legacy ==
In October 1871, after 40 years of leadership at Amoskeag, Dean declined reelection and was complimented by the board of directors upon the retirement. He died on December 5, 1871.

In his will, beyond gifts to individual family members and friends, Dean gave $80,000 to Tufts College and $5,000 to the Manchester City Library. He gave all of his remaining "Emmons Farm" property, including his residence, to the First Universalist Church in Franklin. The Franklin Library Association received 25 shares of Boston and Albany Railroad stock. Hundreds of shares of other stock he owned were given to Dean Academy, the income from which was to pay teachers' salaries. All his remaining property was also given to the academy.

Dean College considers the Oliver Dean honors scholarship its most prestigious, for which students are selected based on academic and extracurricular information in their applications. Recipients are immediately offered participation in the honor's program and a national leadership and success society.
