= Franklin High School (Massachusetts) =

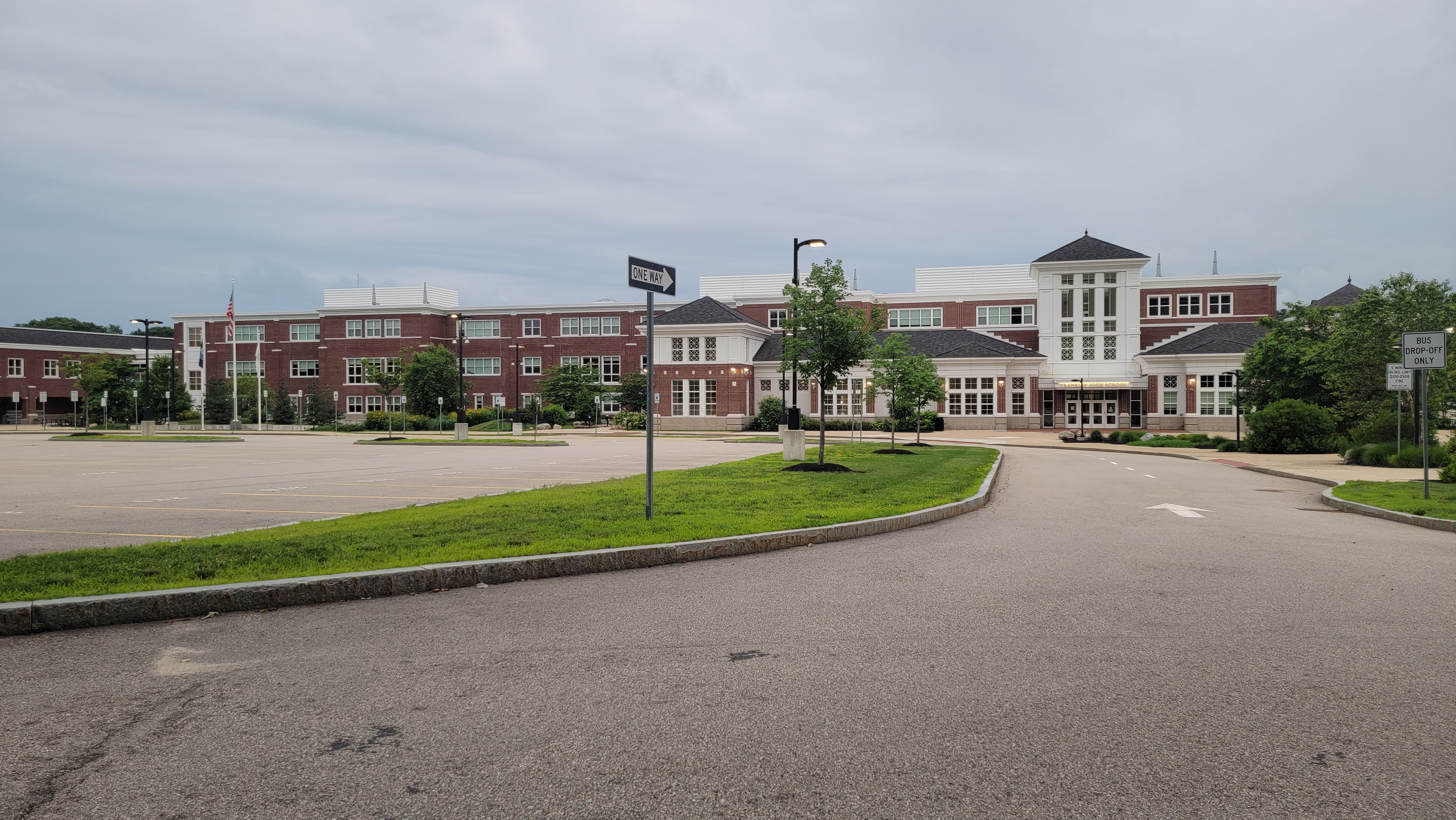

Location
- 218 Oak Street; Franklin, Massachusetts 02038; United States; 42°05′37″N 71°24′33″W

Information
- Type: Public
- Established: 1947; 79 years ago
- NCES School ID: 250501000737
- Principal: Maria Weber
- Teaching staff: 98.12 (FTE)
- Grades: 9–12
- Enrollment: 1,453 (2024-2025)
- Student to teacher ratio: 14.81
- Colors: Navy, Sky Blue, and White
- Athletics: MIAA - Division 1
- Athletics conference: Hockomock League
- Mascot: Frankie the Panther
- Nickname: Panthers
- Rival: King Philip Regional High School
- Newspaper: Pantherbook
- Website: www.franklinps.net/o/fhs

Franklin High School is a public high school located in Franklin, Massachusetts, United States. In the 2025-26 school year the school has an enrollment of 1,379 students. Its campus is located at 218 Oak Street. The current school building opened in 2014.

== Athletics ==
- Mascot: Panthers
- League: Hockomock

Accomplishments

- Girls' soccer - MIAA Division 1 South Sectional Champions - 2010, MIAA Division 1 State Champions - 2012
- Boys' Ice Hockey won State championships in 1983 and 2016
- Boys' Baseball won State championships in 1986 and 2018
- Boys' Basketball won a State championship in 2025
- Volleyball won a State championship in 2025

Sports by season:

- Fall
  - Cheerleading
  - Cross country
  - Field hockey
  - Football
  - Golf
  - Boys' soccer
  - Girls' soccer
  - Volleyball
- Winter
  - Boys' basketball
  - Girls' basketball
  - Cheerleading
  - Boys' ice hockey
  - Girls' ice hockey
  - Curling
  - Indoor track
  - Skiing
  - Boys' swimming
  - Girls' swimming
  - Wrestling
- Spring
  - Baseball
  - Girls' lacrosse
  - Boys' lacrosse
  - Softball
  - Boys' tennis
  - Girls' tennis
  - Boys' track
  - Girls' track

== Music and performing arts ==
The FHS Music Department is a part of the Massachusetts Music Educator's Association Central District (CD-MMEA) and sends several students to join the senior festival every year. It is also a part of the Massachusetts Instrumental & Choral Conductors Association (MICCA), where all ensembles participate in their respective annual festivals. The Jazz Band participates in their own separate festival (MAJE). The drama club, FHSTC, performs three plays or musicals per year, and participates in the Massachusetts Educational Theatre Guild (METG) High School Drama Festival each year, for which it has been a finalist twice.

Musical ensembles:

- String Orchestra
- Symphony Orchestra
- Concert Band
- Wind Ensemble
- Chorus
- Chamber Chorus
- Treble Chorus
- Jazz Band
- Jazz Combo
- Jazz Trio
- Pep Band

Annual performances, music:

- All home varsity football games
- Pep Rally
- Thanksgiving Day Game
- Two varsity basketball games
- Memorial Day
- Winter Concert
- Spring Concert
- MICCA
- Jazz Nights
- Pops Night
- Graduation

Annual performances, drama:

- Cabaret
- Fall Musical
- DramaFest
- Spring Student-Directed Play
- Musical Theater Showcase
- OSKEY

Previous school plays and musicals:

Year			
2024-2025	The Outsiders	The Yellow Boat	Urinetown: The Musical
2023-2024	Legally Blonde	Flowers for Algernon	Peter and the Starcatcher
2022-2023	Cinderella	Lord of the Flies	Get Smart
2021-2022	Mamma Mia!	Cave Dream	
2019-2020	Six Rounds of Vengeance*	Chicago	
2018-2019	Miracle on 34th Street	Seussical	
2017-2018	Fahrenheit 451	The Addams Family Musical	
2016-2017	The Giver/Gathering Blue	Once on This Island	
2015-2016	The Rose of Treason	Beauty and the Beast	
2014-2015	Rebel Without a Cause	Shrek the Musical	

*canceled due to the COVID-19 pandemic

== Specialized programs ==
Franklin Arts Academy (FAA): An alternate course pathway, the FAA enables students that are accepted into the program to take courses only available to FAA students, requiring an art component as part of the application. The courses include FAA versions of regular English, history, and some science classes, as well FAA art courses. The FAA also holds fundraisers to go on one field trip a year to a performance and/or museum. Students can join beginning in their sophomore year, applying as a freshman. All fine arts students, including both the performing and visual arts, are able to join.

Senior Project: As a participant in Senior Project, students will increase their awareness of the necessary steps for achieving a set career, service, or artistic path by participating in a full-time externship during the final quarter of their senior year. Students will complete various project objectives including: 70 hours of professional externship experience, written reflection papers, a cumulative portfolio, and a final presentation to a panel. Students must submit a proposal for Senior Project by the end of their junior year. The proposal is reviewed by a panel who will determine if the Project had the potential to be completed successfully. Upon acceptance into the Senior Project, students will enroll in a preparatory course during the 3rd term of their senior year and then commence their externship during the final quarter of their senior year. Senior Project provides students with the opportunity to apply their academic, social, and civic skills developed throughout the course of their experiences at FHS and realize connections between their high school education and future careers.

== Notable alumni ==
- Peter Laviolette, Class of 1982, former NHL player and NHL head coach
- Richard Grieco, Class of 1983, actor and former fashion model
- Pat Mason, Class of 1993, former head baseball coach at Virginia Tech
- Jen O'Malley Dillon, Class of 1994, White House deputy chief of staff and campaign manager
- Elliott Connie, Class of 1994, psychotherapist, author, host of "The Elliott Connie Show", and social media content creator
- Kristi Kirshe, Class of 2013, Olympian on US Women's Rugby team at the 2020 Tokyo Summer Olympics and Olympic Bronze medalist at the 2024 Paris Olympics.
- Rogan O'Handley - Class of 2003, Right-Wing social media influencer known as DC Draino.
- Paula Lodi
- Maria Barrett
