= Beran (surname) =

Beran (feminine: Beranová) is a Czech surname, meaning 'ram' (male sheep). The Polish and Slovak counterpart of the surname is Baran. Notable people with the surname include:

- Ben Beran (born 1984), American basketball player
- Bruce Beran (born 1935), American vice admiral
- Christa Beran (1922–1992), Austrian rescuer of Holocaust victims
- Dave Beran (born 1984), American chef
- Emerik Beran (1868–1940), Czech-Slovenian composer
- Jiří Beran (born 1982), Czech fencer
- Jiří Beran (skier) (born 1952), Czech cross-country skier
- Josef Beran (1888–1969), Czech cardinal
- Ladislav Beran (born 1967), Czech actor
- Matěj Beran (born 1993), Czech ice hockey player
- Michal Beran (ice hockey) (born 1973), Slovak ice hockey player
- Rudolf Beran (1887–1954), Czech politician

== See also ==
- Lajos Berán (1882–1943), Hungarian sculptor
- Beránek
