= Red Brick School =

Red Brick School may refer to:

- Red Brick School (Wiscasset, Maine), listed on the National Register of Historic Places (NRHP) in Lincoln County
- Red Brick School (Franklin, Massachusetts), NRHP-listed in Norfolk County
- Red Brick School (Oregon, Wisconsin), NRHP-listed
