= John and Flora Gilbert House =

Historic house in Wisconsin, United States

- U.S. National Register of Historic Places
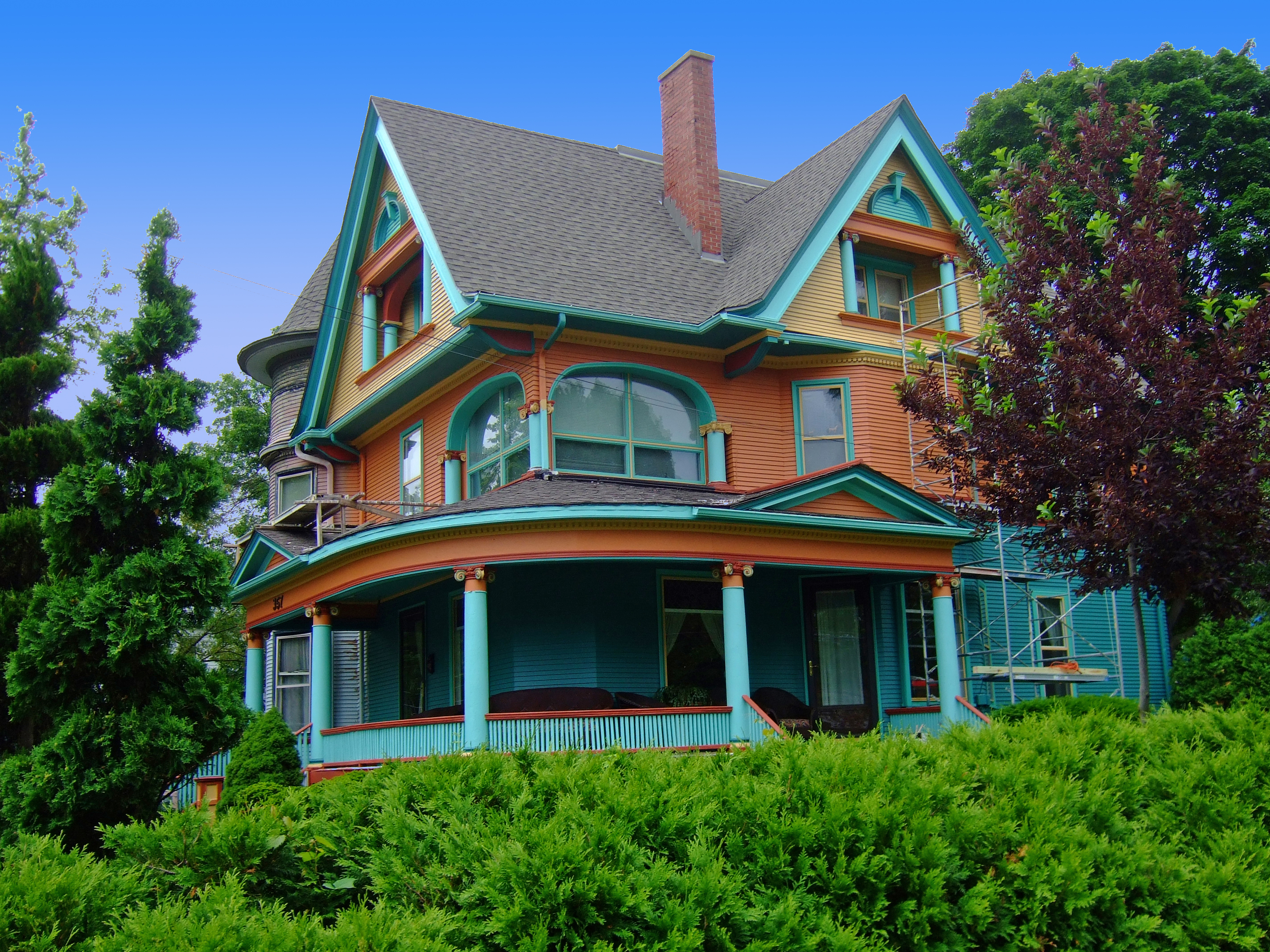

- Location within Wisconsin Location within the United States
- Location: 357 N. Main St. Oregon, Wisconsin
- Coordinates: 42°55′53″N 89°23′2″W
- Built: 1906
- Architectural style: Queen Anne
- NRHP reference No.: 07000933
- Added to NRHP: September 6, 2007

The John and Flora Gilbert House is a historic house located in Oregon, Wisconsin. It was added to the National Register of Historic Places on September 6, 2007.

== History ==
John and Flora Gilbert built the Queen Anne style house in 1906, when they retired to Oregon. They lived there until their deaths in 1956 and 1962.

The house is located in the Lincoln Street Historic District.
