= Michal Beran =

Michal Beran may refer to:

- Michal Beran (ice hockey) (born 1973), Slovak professional ice hockey player
- Michal Beran (footballer) (born 2000), Czech footballer
