= WGAO =

- Franklin, Massachusetts; United States
- Frequency: 88.3 MHz

Programming
- Format: Album-oriented rock

Ownership
- Owner: Dean College

History
- First air date: September 29, 1975

Technical information
- Licensing authority: FCC
- Facility ID: 15985
- Class: A
- ERP: 175 watts
- HAAT: 58 meters (190 ft)
- Transmitter coordinates: 42°5′8.3″N 71°23′52.2″W

Links
- Public license information: Public file; LMS
- Webcast: Listen live
- Website: www.power883.org

WGAO (88.3 FM) is a radio station broadcasting an album-oriented rock format. Licensed to Franklin, Massachusetts, United States, the station is owned by Dean College.

== History ==
On October 3, 1973, what was then known as Dean Junior College applied for a 10-watt Class D educational radio station to broadcast on 91.3 MHz. The station was first issued the call sign WGAO on January 7, 1974, and was first licensed on September 29, 1975. On September 24, 1980, it applied to upgrade to a Class A station by moving to 88.3 MHz and to increase power to 175 watts.

== See also ==
- Campus radio
- List of college radio stations in the United States
