= Lincoln Street Historic District (Oregon, Wisconsin) =

Historic district in Wisconsin, United States

- U.S. National Register of Historic Places
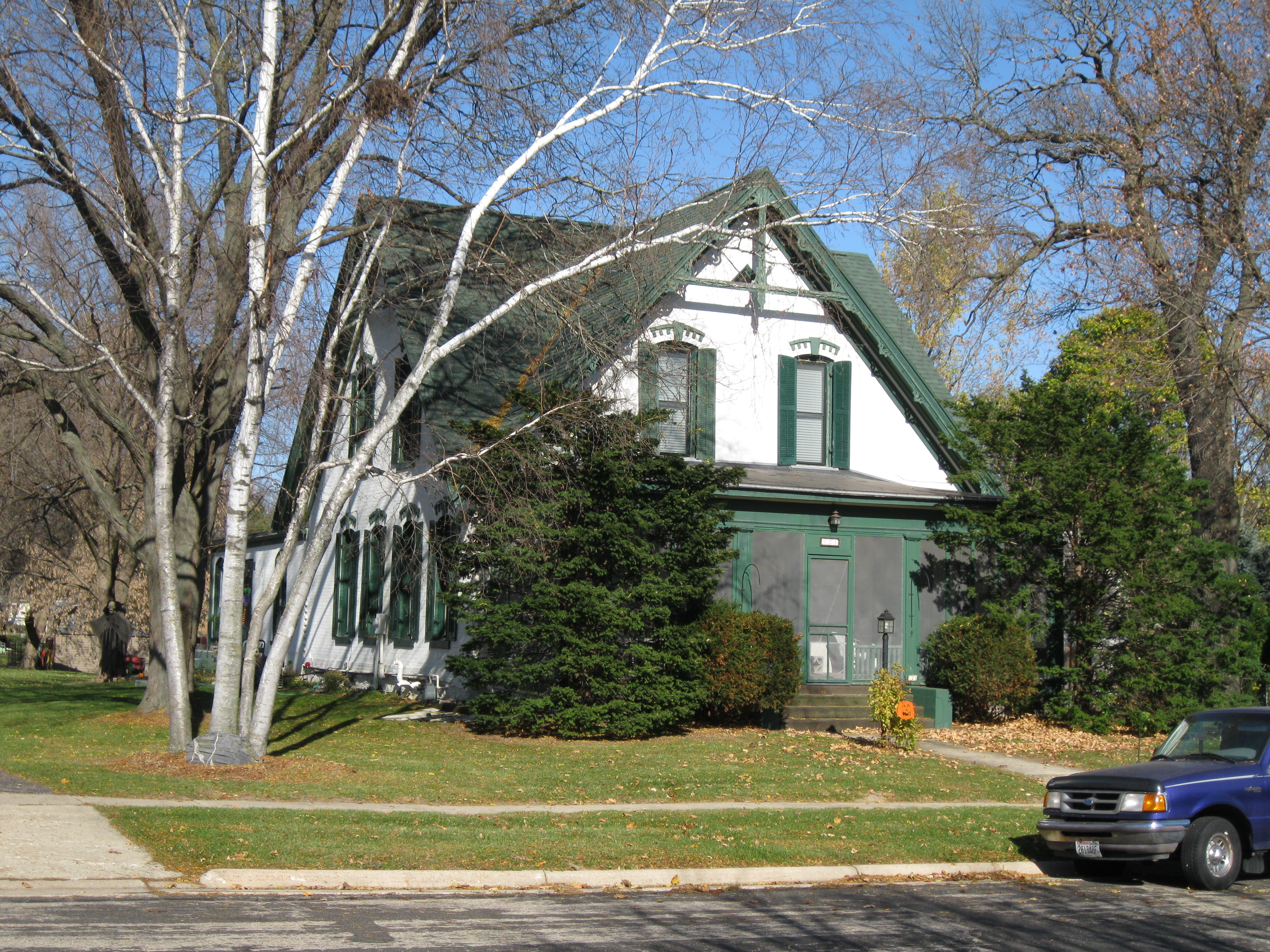
- A house formerly belonging to Oliver Palmer, located in the district.
- Location: W. Lincoln St., bet. Main St. and Market St., Oregon, Wisconsin
- Area: 2 acres (0.81 ha)
- NRHP reference No.: 06000276
- Added to NRHP: April 12, 2006

The Lincoln Street Historic District is a largely intact group of five homes built from 1880 to around 1900 in Oregon, Wisconsin. It was added to the State and the National Register of Historic Places in 2006.

These are the five houses in the district:

- The Warner house at 126 W. Lincoln is a 2-story simple Queen Anne-styled house built about 1871(?), tall and narrow, with a porch supported by turned posts, with a decorative crown over each window, and with a corbelled chimney. The house was built by Jacob Warner, an immigrant from Wurtemburg, Germany.
- The Palmer/Gillette house at 121 W. Lincoln Street is a 1.5-story brick house built about 1880, with Gothic Revival styling evident in the bargeboards and kingposts in the gable peaks and the tall window hoods. An accompanying horse barn built around 1900 has been converted to a garage. One source says the house was built by William and Eva Gillette; others say Oliver M. Palmer.

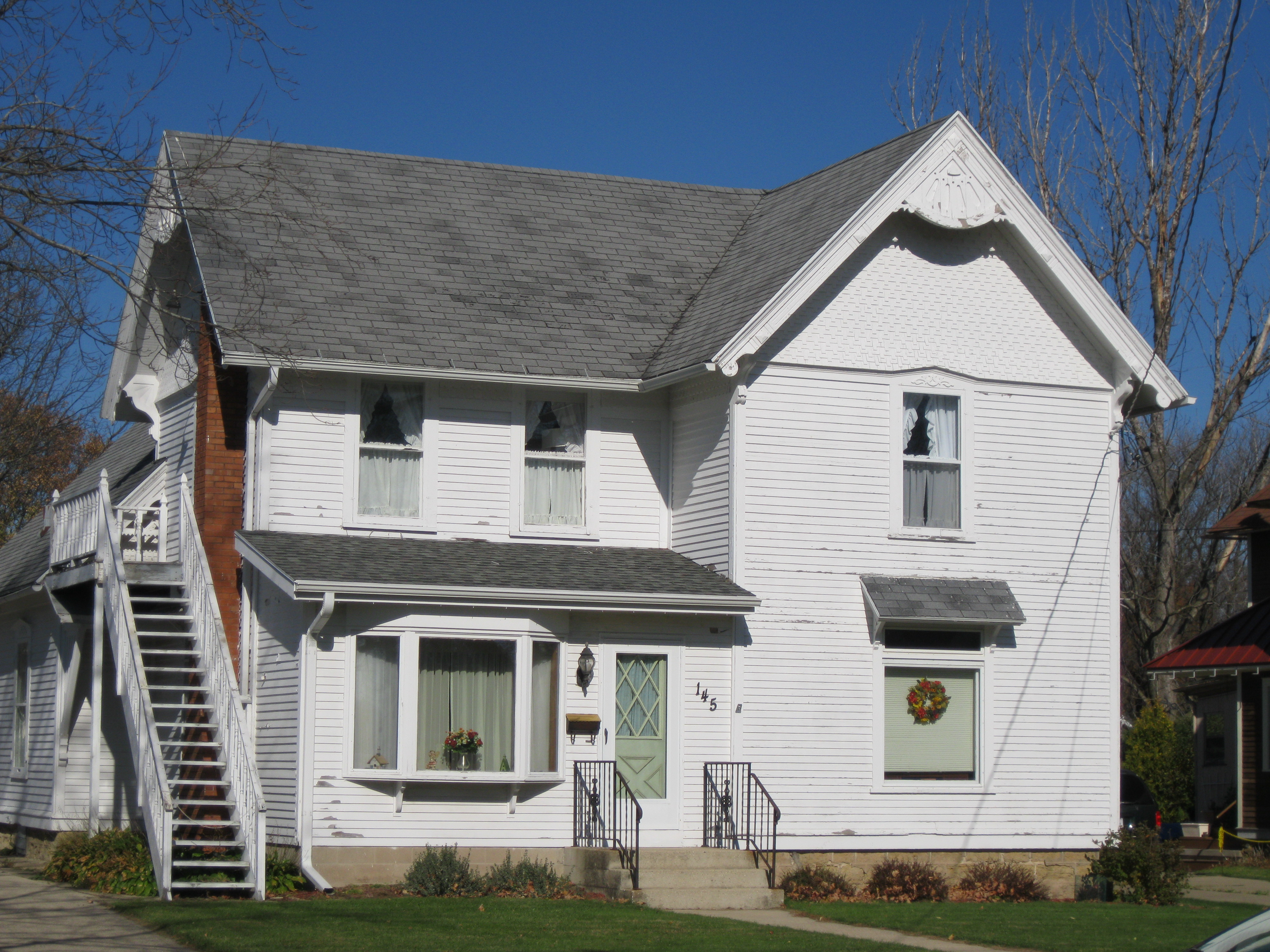
1890 Algard/Fischer house

- The Algard/Fischer house at 145 W. Lincoln Street is a 2-story house built about 1890, wood-framed, sitting on a cut stone foundation. Queen Anne styling is seen in the gable ends, in the fine fish-scale shingles and the decorative bargeboards. Most windows have decorative hood-moulds. The house was built for Henry N. Algard, a farmer who bred Durham-grade cattle and merino sheep, and a town supervisor. He was also involved with several stores. Fischer, the second resident, was the local depot agent.

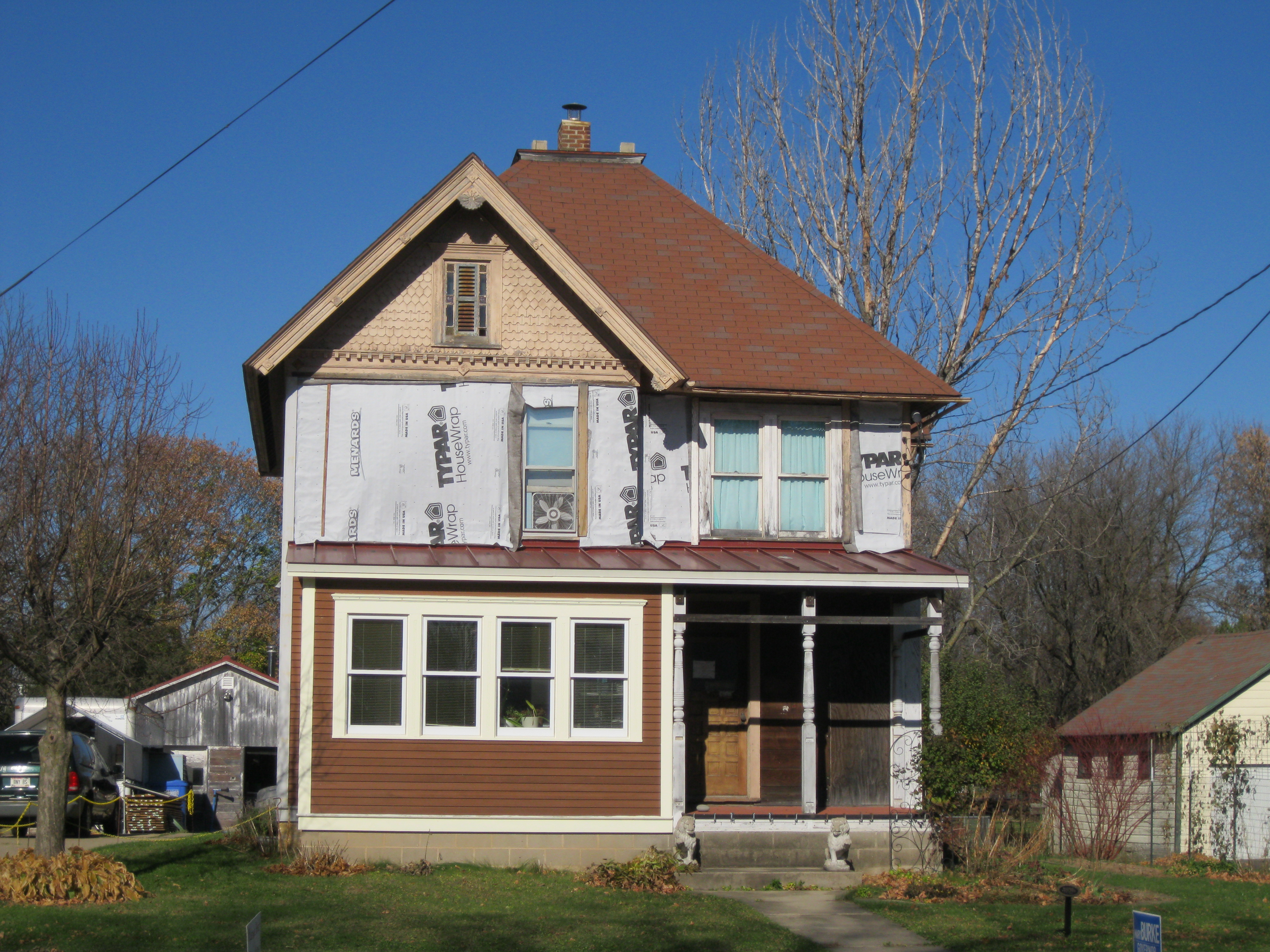
1894 Williamson/Rose house

- The Williamson/Rose house at 133 W. Lincoln Street is a 2.5-story frame house with a truncated hip roof built about 1894. The hip roof is varied with gables decorated with bargeboards and the decorative fish-scale shingles that signal Queen Anne style. On the side is a 1-story bay window with a balcony above, sheltered by a small gable. One source says this house was built by J.S. Williamson; others say Oliver O. Rose.

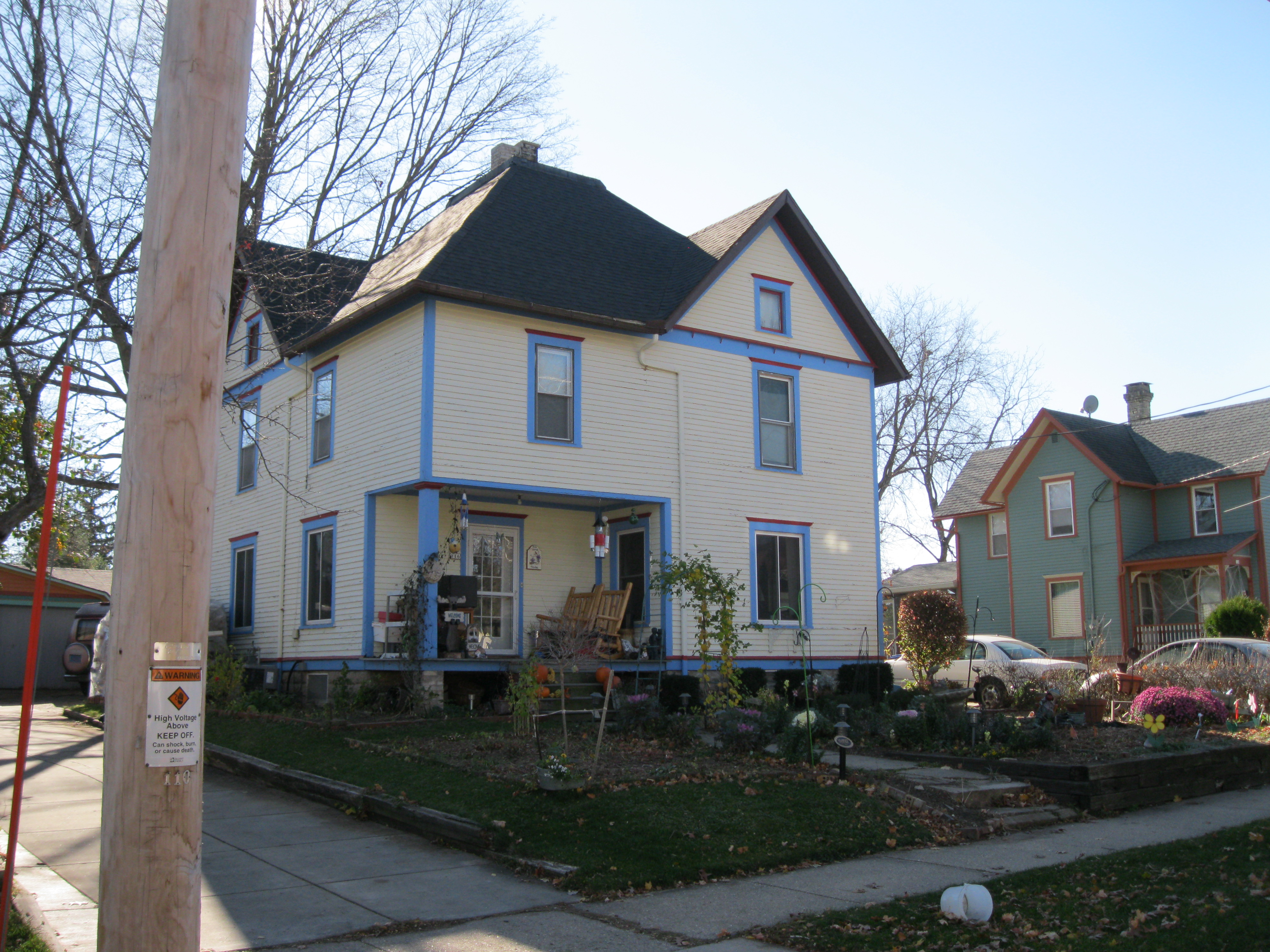
ca 1900 Gilbert house

- The Gilbert house at 116 W. Lincoln Street is basically a 2-story cube shape with a hip roof, but a porch is cut out of one corner and the roof is made more interesting with gable dormers and a hip-roofed dormer. Its clapboard-clad walls sit on a foundation of rusticated concrete blocks. Decoration is understated, with simple trim boards and tiny brackets on the board beneath the gable. John and Flora Gilbert were farmers who retired to Oregon. John built this house around 1900 and the adjacent house at 357 Main St.
