= Elliott Connie =

American psychotherapist and author

- Connie in 2026
- Born: Elliott E. Connie
- Occupations: Psychotherapist, author, educator
- Known for: Solution-Focused Brief Therapy
- Notable work: The Art of Solution Focused Therapy (2009); Solution Building in Couples Therapy (2013)
- Website: www.elliottconnie.com

Elliott E. Connie is an American psychotherapist, author, and trainer associated with the practice and dissemination of Solution-focused brief therapy (SFBT), a goal-oriented model of psychotherapy. He has authored several works on SFBT and contributes to clinical education in the field.

== Early life and education ==
Connie was born in Chicago in 1976 and raised in Massachusetts and graduated from Franklin High School in Franklin, Massachusetts. He holds a bachelor degree and a master's degree in counseling from Texas Wesleyan University and is a licensed professional counselor.

== Career ==
Connie is a licensed psychotherapist practicing in the United States. He has worked with individuals, couples, and families using solution-focused therapeutic methods, which emphasize clients’ goals and resources rather than extended exploration of problems. He also conducts trainings throughout the world on SFBT.

Connie is author or co-author of several books, including The Art of Solution Focused Therapy, The Solution Focused Brief Therapy Diamond, Change Your Questions, Change Your Future: Overcome Challenges and Create a New Vision for Your Life Using the Principles of Solution Focused Brief Therapy, and Solution Building in Couples Therapy.

Along with publications, Connie has produced multiple videos that demonstrate his therapeutic techniques for a wider audience, including topics such as an introduction to SFBT and a video focused on telehealth psychotherapy.

Connie is known for conducting live demonstrations during his trainings to show the strengths and challenges of SFBT. He has been described as having a "minimalistic approach" to SFBT.

== Selected publications ==
- Connie, Elliott; Metcalf, Linda (2009). The Art of Solution Focused Therapy. Springer. ISBN 9786612259562.
- Connie, Elliott (2013). Solution Building in Couples Therapy. Springer. ISBN 9780826109606.
- Froerer, Adam S.; Connie, Elliott, eds. (2018). Solution-Focused Brief Therapy with Clients Managing Trauma. Oxford University Press. ISBN 9780190678814.
- Connie, Elliott E.; Froerer, Adam S. (2023). The Solution Focused Brief Therapy Diamond: A New Approach to SFBT That Will Empower Both Practitioner and Client to Achieve the Best Outcomes. Hay House, Inc. ISBN 9781401970505.
- Connie, Elliott E.; Froerer, Adam S. (2024). Change Your Questions, Change Your Future: Overcome Challenges and Create a New Vision for Your Life Using the Principles of Solution Focused Brief Therapy. Hay House LLC. ISBN 9781401970529.

== Personal life ==
Connie currently lives in Arlington, Texas.
