= Jeff Richgels =

American ten-pin bowler

Jeff Richgels, of Oregon, Wisconsin, is a former member of the Professional Bowlers Association who competes on the PBA50 Tour and PBA Regional Tour. He has won 30 PBA Regional titles.

As an amateur, Jeff represented the United States at the 1985 Federation Internationale des Quilleurs (FIQ) American Zone Championships in Bogota, Colombia, where he won gold medals in team and trios. Jeff also is a member of the United States Bowling Congress (USBC) and has won five titles at the USBC Open Championships. He is one of three bowlers in the long history of the USBC Open Championships to complete team, doubles and singles events (a total of nine games) in a given year without an open frame. (This means he rolled a strike or spare in every frame of the tournament.) The "90 clean frame" achievement came in 1997, when he also won the Regular All-Events title.

His accomplishments earned him induction into the USBC Hall of Fame in 2011.

Jeff also was inducted into the Wisconsin State Bowling Association Hall of Fame in 2013 and the Madison (WI) Bowling Association Hall of Fame in 2008.

Jeff also owns and operates The11thFrame.com, a subscription-based website that covers the sport and industry.
