= Beránek =

Beránek (feminine: Beránková) is a Czech surname. It is a diminutive of the word beran, meaning 'little ram' (little male sheep) or 'little Beran'. Notable people with the surname include:

- Alois Beranek (1900–1983), Austrian football player, manager and referee
- Bohuslav Beránek (1946−2007), Czech orienteer
- Christian Beranek (born 1974), American graphic novelist and filmmaker
- Espen Beranek Holm (born 1960), Norwegian pop artist and comedian
- Jan Beránek (born 1970), Czech ecological activist and politician
- Jana Beránková, Czech figure skater
- Josef Beránek (born 1969), Czech ice hockey player
- Kateřina Beránková (born 1977), Czech figure skater
- Leo Beranek (1914−2016), American acoustician
- Miroslav Beránek (born 1957), Czech football coach
- Renata Beránková (born 1971), Czech rower
