= Oregon Water Tower and Pump House =

- U.S. National Register of Historic Places
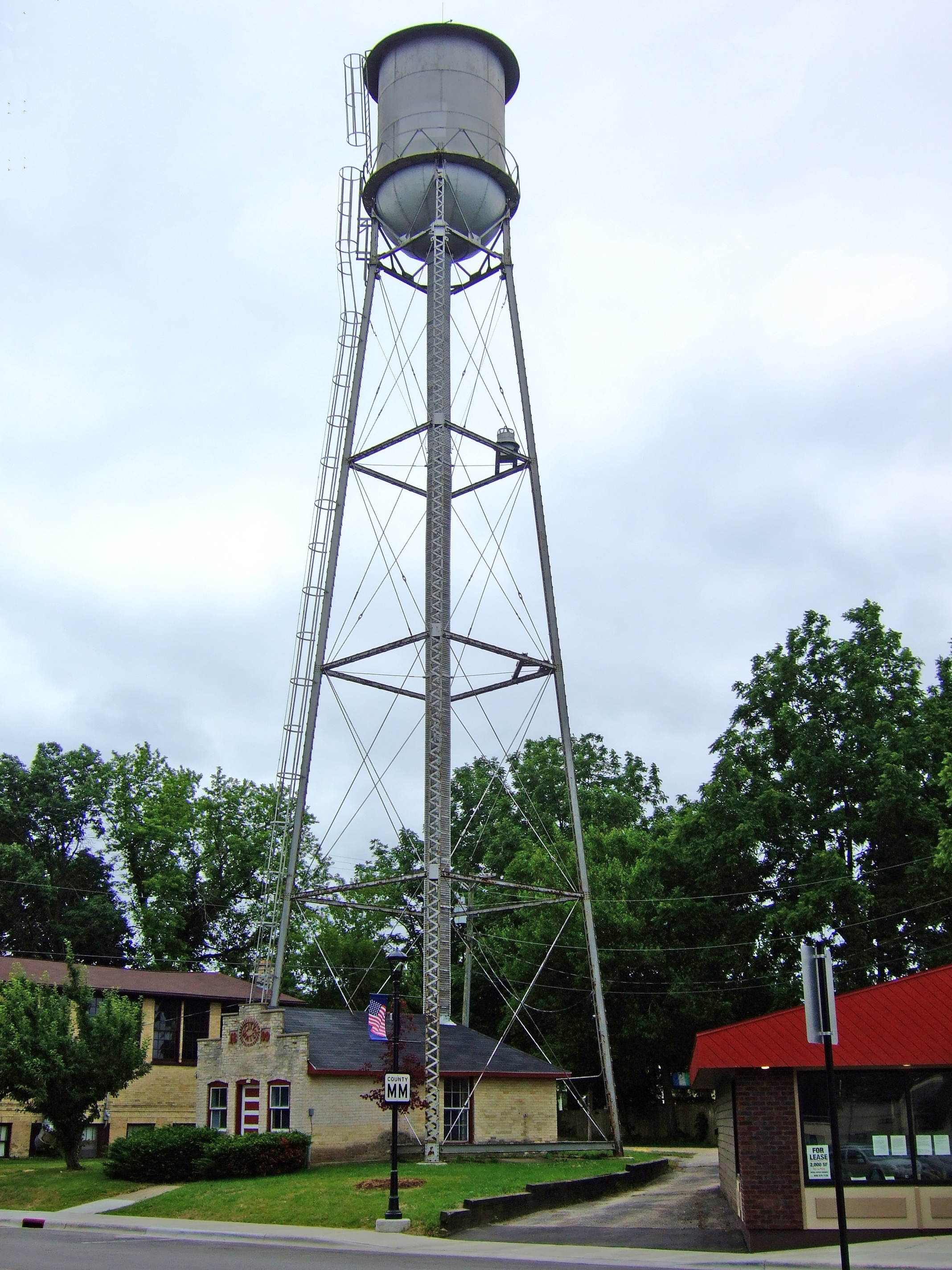
- Oregon Water Tower and Pump House

- Location within Wisconsin
- Location: 134 Janesville St.
- Nearest city: Oregon, Wisconsin
- Coordinates: 42°55′31.4″N 89°23′1.8″W
- Built: 1899
- NRHP reference No.: 07001097
- Added to NRHP: October 16, 2007

The Oregon Water Tower and Pump House is a metal tower with a brick pump house built in 1899 in Oregon, Wisconsin. It was added to the National Register of Historic Places in 2007.

== History ==
The water tower and pump house were built in 1899 after concerns were raised in Oregon about fire protection and water supply. In 1921, the wooden tank on the tower was replaced with a metal one. The water tower was drained and removed from service in 1981. The pump house and water tower were designated cultural landmarks by the village board after that. In 2007, both were listed on the state and national registers of historic places. The chairman of the Oregon Historic Preservation Commission, described the tower structure as iconic and representative of downtown Oregon and small-town America in general. The New York Times reported in 2009 that other small towns in the United States were also seeking to preserve ordinary, utilitarian structures, describing them as "the things that represent ordinary people and workers."

== Construction ==
The water tower is a 100 feet (30 m) tall and has four steel trestle legs supporting an all steel water tank. It is described as a "classic tin man" style, which was once a common form of water tank design introduced in 1894.

The pump house is a two-room, brick, utilitarian structure which once contained a water pump and gasoline engine that ran the pump.
