= Lyman F. Anderson =

American politician

Lyman Anderson

Member of the Wisconsin State Assembly from the 47th district
- In office 1975–1977

Personal details
- Born: February 16, 1926 Oregon, Wisconsin
- Died: October 25, 2005 (aged 79) Oregon, Wisconsin
- Party: Republican
- Education: University of Wisconsin–Madison (BA)

Lyman F. Anderson (February 16, 1926 – October 25, 2005) was an American farmer and politician who served as a member of the Wisconsin State Assembly.

== Early life and education ==
Anderson was born in Oregon, Wisconsin. He was the son of Frank Ramus Anderson and Mary Almeda Anderson. He graduated from Oregon High School in Oregon, Wisconsin and earned a bachelor's degree in history from the University of Wisconsin–Madison.

== Career ==
Anderson was active in local, county and state government for over four decades. He was elected to the Oregon Village Board in 1961 and served until 1974. Anderson served on the Dane County Board of Supervisors from 1972 to 1976 and again from 1980 to 2004. He represented the 47th Assembly District in the Wisconsin State Assembly from 1975 to 1977.

== Personal life ==
He died in 2005 after being hospitalized with kidney failure two years earlier.

The Lyman F. Anderson Agriculture & Conservation Center in Madison, Wisconsin is named in his honor.
