= Baran Süzer =

Turkish businessperson

Ali Baran Süzer
- Born: Istanbul
- Occupation: Businessman

Ali Baran Süzer is a Turkish businessperson and vice chairman of Suzer group that owns The Ritz-Carlton hotel chain in Turkey. The group also owns KentBank, a Croatian universal bank, Moxy Wynwood Miami hotel and Nobu, Istanbul.

Süzer is also a member of Board of Trustees for Süzer Foundation. In 2009, he was elected as the "Best Second Generation Businessman" and in 2011 he was included in the list of the "25 Most Successful Businessmen Under 35" of Forbes Turkey.

== Biography ==
Baran was born in Istanbul to Mustafa Süzer, a Turkish businessman. He has a brother, Serhan Suzer and a sister, Nazli Suzer.

Süzer got his higher education in United States and the United Kingdom first at Dean College in Franklin, Massachusetts followed by Richmond University The American University in London in Richmond, England. After his mandatory military service in the Turkish Navy, he joined Suzer Group as the president of Real Estate Group in 2004.
