= Red Brick School (Massachusetts) =

- U.S. National Register of Historic Places
- U.S. Historic district – Contributing property
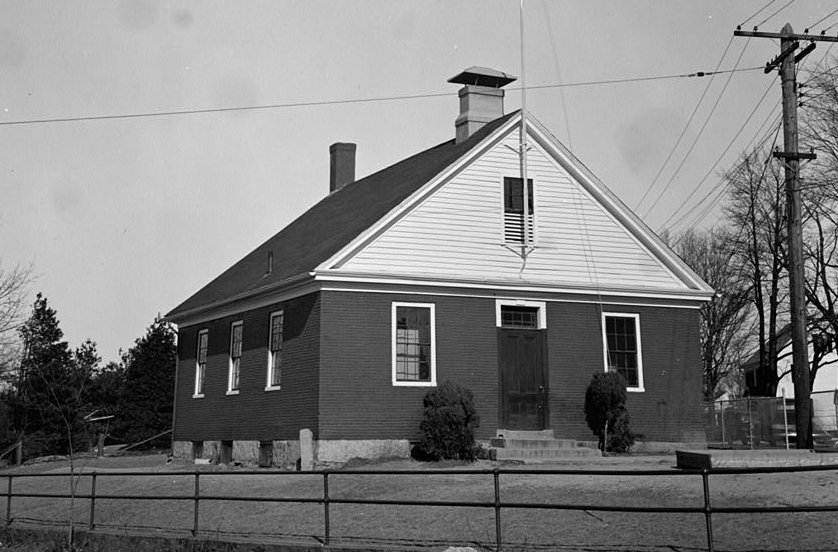
- The school in 1941

- Location within Massachusetts Location within the United States
- Location: Franklin, Massachusetts
- Coordinates: 42°5′34″N 71°24′0″W
- Built: 1833
- Part of: Franklin Common Historic District (ID05000218)
- NRHP reference No.: 76000276

Significant dates
- Added to NRHP: January 1, 1976
- Designated CP: March 31, 2005

The Red Brick School is a historic school in Franklin, Massachusetts. It was one of the oldest active one-room schools in the United States.

== History ==
The first school building on this site was a wooden one constructed after the Rev. Nathanael Emmons took a 900-year lease on the land. The school was built at the corner of Maple Street and Main Street, although the latter is now called Lincoln Street and the school building is number two. The "Meeting House School" building and the 900-year lease were taken over by the town authorities. At this time it was known as the "school at the crossroads", although it was also used by the Congregational church for their children's Sunday-school classes. The school's early association with religion was strong. In 1792 it was agreed that no school master should be appointed who did not "promise to pray in the school each day.

== The red bricks ==
The bricks that gave their name to this school building were shipped via oxen from Boston. This school was built on the foundation of the older, wooden schoolhouse in 1833. By 1835 Mortimer Blake was running a high school in the building that was proving so popular that it was overflowing despite the charges of 25 to 35 cents per week. They had to move the lessons to larger premises.

In 1852 the church stopped having Sunday school at the same building.

The administration attempted to shut down the school during the Great Depression, due to its costs, but the townspeople rallied behind it. The school again almost closed in 1959, when it was declared unsafe, but the town of Franklin's residents paid to have it refurbished. The proceeds from selling six-inch square ceramic tiles with a depiction of the school on the front and a history of the school on the back supported this. The building was added to the National Register of Historic Places in 1976.

== Public school tradition continues ==
In 2008, after 175 years of regular use, the Red Brick School, which was serving as a kindergarten for Franklin's Public School System, was deemed to be "surplus" by the Franklin School Department. The school committee voted to close the school and turned the Red Brick School over to the control of the Town Of Franklin. The town, with community support, worked closely with the Benjamin Franklin Classical Charter Public School to incorporate the little Brick School into their educational offerings. Today the tradition of public education continues in this one room classroom, viewed by many as a town treasure. The school remains a large tourist attraction and is rarely used by the town of Franklin in an effort to let the school remain in clean shape.

== Dispute over record ==
The Town of Franklin claimed that the Red Brick School was the longest continuously-running one-room brick school house providing public education in the nation. That record was disputed by several members of Franklin's community when the decision on whether or not to close the school was being weighed by Franklin's School Committee. A town employee and public school parent discovered that the town of Croydon, New Hampshire also had a "one-room school house" whose building is fifty years older than the Red Brick School. The ensuing discussion focused on whether the term "one room" meant class space or actual rooms. The Croydon schoolhouse actually had two rooms, one used today as a classroom and the other used as extra space, holding a table, a counter, cabinets, and a copy machine.

The school department established a task force to study all the issues surrounding the school and to answer the questions raised by the debate. The task force report addresses the Croydon School House and can be found on the town of Franklin's website.

== See also ==
- National Register of Historic Places listings in Norfolk County, Massachusetts
