= Rogan O'Handley =

American political commentator

DC Draino
- Born: Rogan Michael John O'Handley; 1985 (age 40–41); San Francisco, California, U.S.
- Education: Northeastern University (BS); University of Chicago (JD)
- Occupations: Political commentator; attorney
- Political party: Republican
- Movement: Right-wing politics, Trumpism
- Website: dcdraino.com

Rogan Michael John O'Handley (born 1985), known professionally as DC Draino, is an American conservative political commentator, influencer, and former entertainment lawyer. He has amassed a following of over 5 million followers on Facebook, Instagram, and X (formerly Twitter) combined as of March 2024.

== Early life and education ==
O'Handley was born in San Francisco and attended Northeastern University, serving as student body president as a senior before graduating in 2007 magna cum laude as a double major in political science and criminal justice. He then earned his J.D. degree at the University of Chicago Law School in 2011.

== Career ==
After being admitted to the California State Bar in 2011, O'Handley began his career as an associate at the Los Angeles office of McDermott Will & Emery, specializing in corporate finance. Then in 2014, O'Handley became an associate attorney with Loeb & Loeb, specializing in entertainment law.

After the 2016 United States presidential election, he started an Instagram account under the pseudonym "DC Draino" as a reference to Trump's phrase "drain the swamp". After the account started to gain traction, he quit his job as an attorney to make social media content full-time. He eventually moved to Tampa, where he founded a digital media company. He has since made appearances on Tucker Carlson Tonight and spoke at the Gays for Trump 2020 event hosted by the Log Cabin Republicans, despite his content being labeled by some as anti-LGBT.
