= Franklin Public Library (Massachusetts) =

First American public lending library

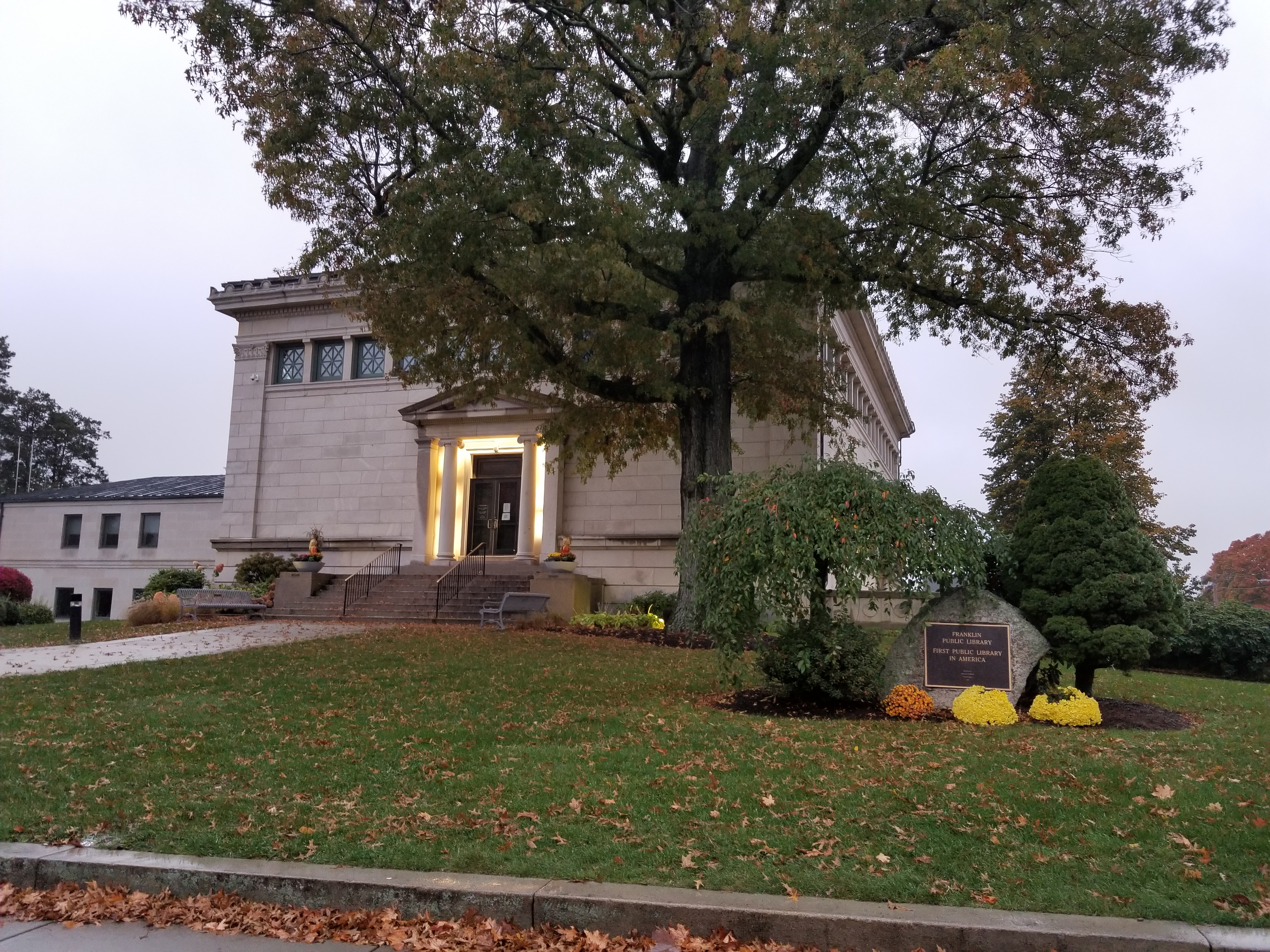
- Location: Franklin, Massachusetts, United States of America
- Type: Public Library
- Established: 1790
- Branches: 1

Access and use
- Population served: 33,092 (2020 census)

Other information
- Budget: $836,477
- Director: Felicia Oti
- Website: www.franklinma.gov/233/Franklin-Public-Library

Franklin Public Library is the first and oldest public lending library in continuous existence in the United States. It was founded in 1790 in Franklin, Massachusetts, with a donation of books from Benjamin Franklin. It is currently located at 118 Main Street in Franklin, at the edge of the downtown Franklin area, right next to Dean College.

A town in Massachusetts chose to name itself Franklin after Benjamin Franklin, and Franklin donated 116 books to the town in lieu of a requested church bell. Franklin's town meeting voted to lend the books to all Franklin inhabitants free of charge in 1790, and this small collection can therefore be considered the first public library in the United States. In 1904, the Ray family donated the current Ray Memorial Building which was dedicated as the first permanent building for the library collection. The Franklin Library Association was in charge of the library until 1981 when town of Franklin began running the Franklin Public Library directly as a department of the town.

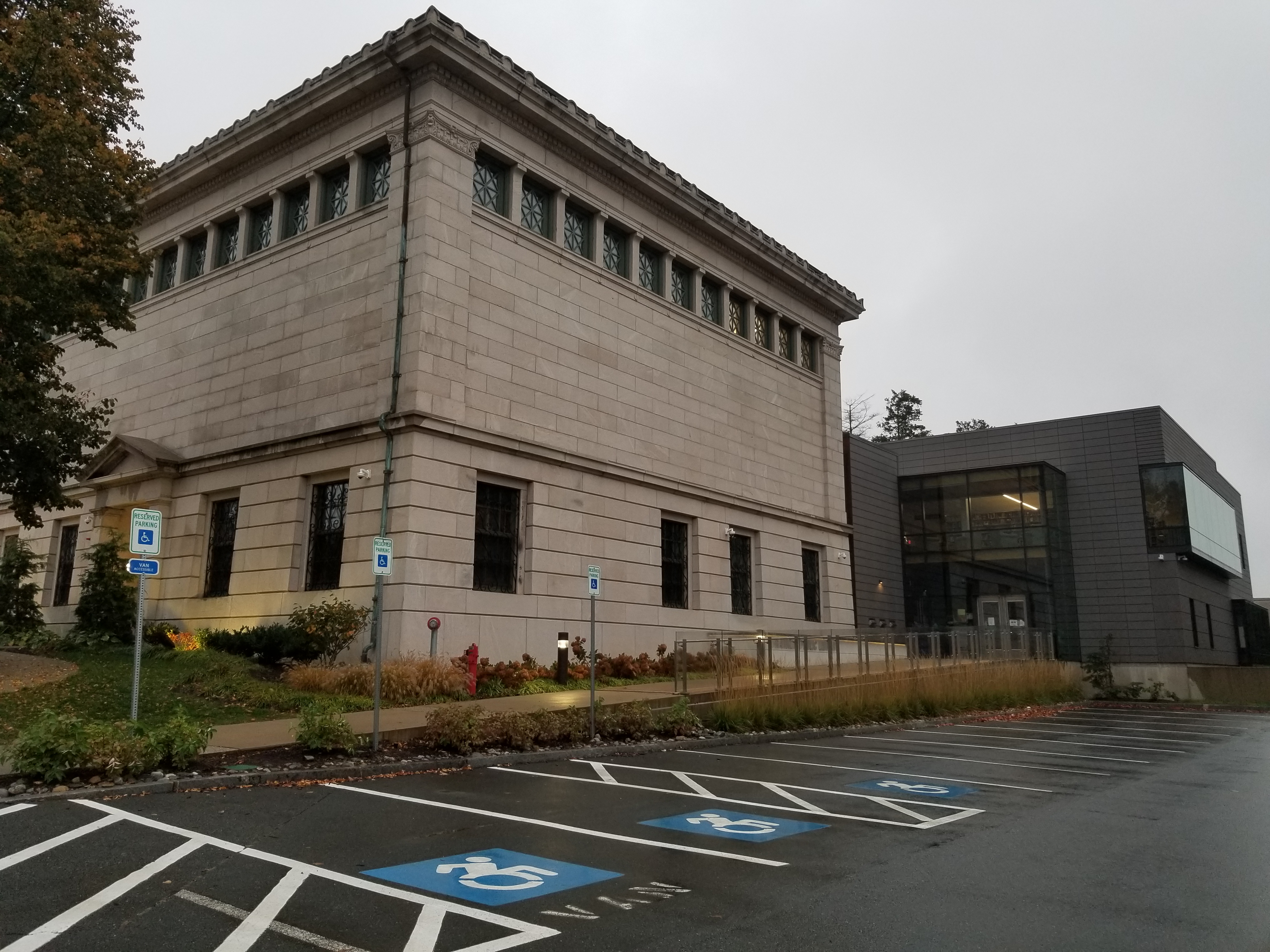
Rear view of the Franklin Public Library with contemporary addition

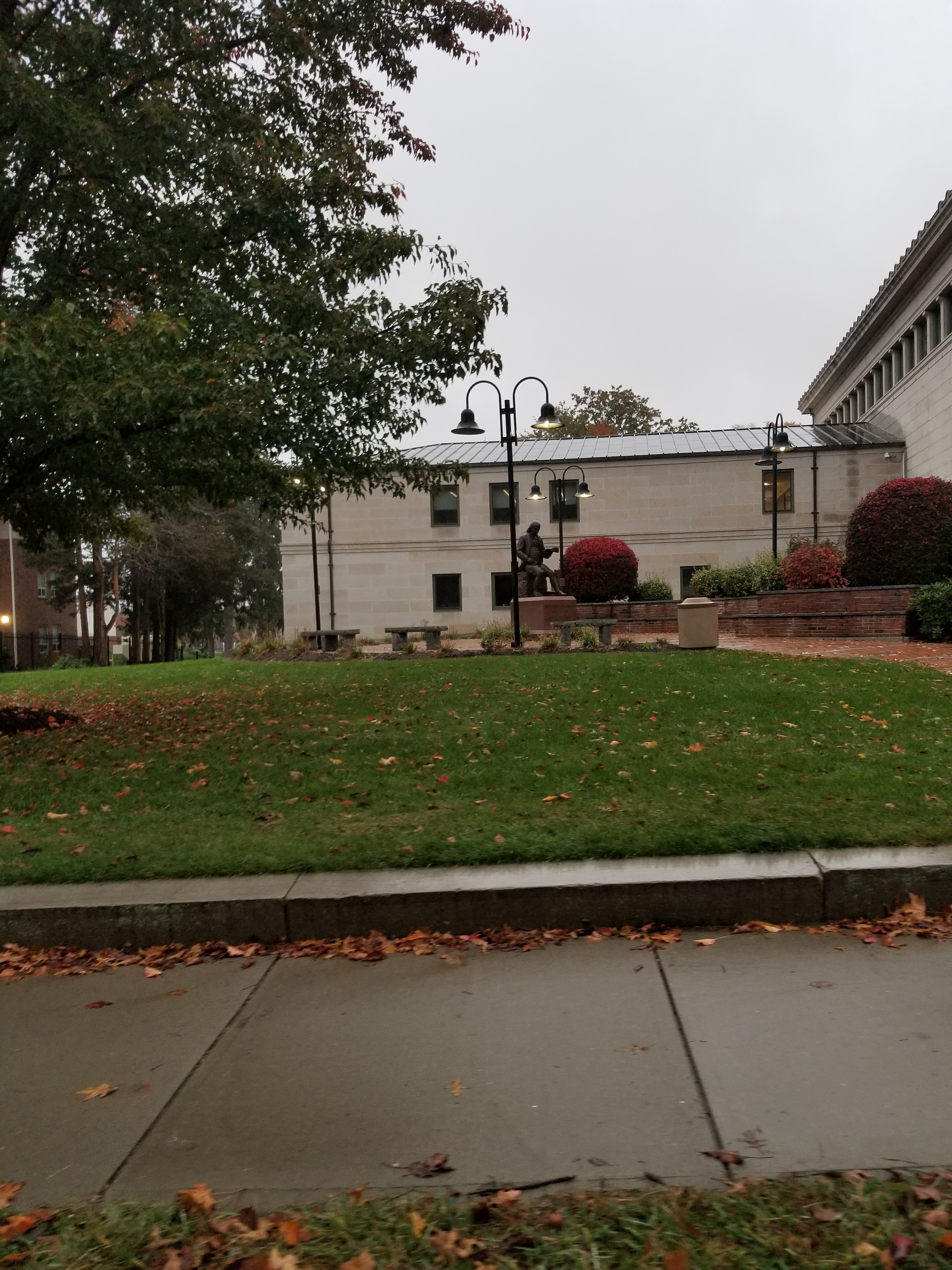
Benjamin Franklin statue at Franklin Public Library
