= Red Brick School (Oregon, Wisconsin) =

- Oregon High School
- U.S. National Register of Historic Places
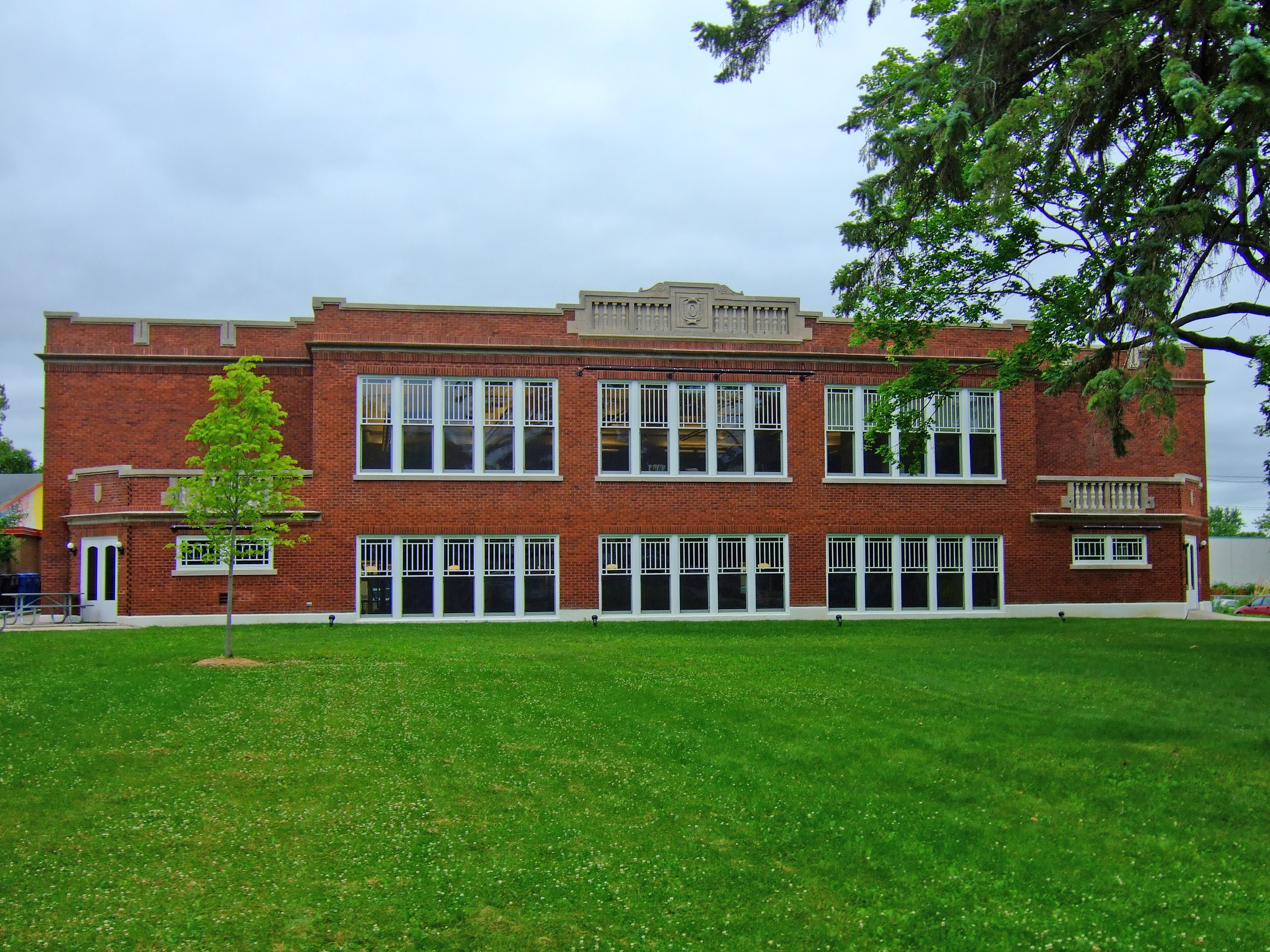

- Location within Wisconsin Location within the United States
- Location: 220 N. Main St., Oregon, Wisconsin, United States
- Coordinates: 42°55′41″N 89°22′58″W
- Area: 8 acres (3.2 ha)
- Built: 1922
- Architect: Tough, Edward; Hayes & Langdon
- Architectural style: Late Gothic Revival
- NRHP reference No.: 98000406
- Added to NRHP: April 23, 1998

The Red Brick School is a public school built in 1922 on the north edge of downtown Oregon, Wisconsin, United States. In 1998 it was added to the National Register of Historic Places.

== History ==
The Red Brick School was built in 1922, at a cost of about $70,000 for both construction and furnishings. It opened that fall to 106 students, four teachers, and a principal. The building served as the local high school and kindergarten.

The building was designed by Madison architect Edward Tough in late Gothic Revival style, evident in its tall, narrow windows and masonry. The walls of the original section were load-bearing clay tile clad in red brick, sitting on a poured concrete foundation. It had hardwood floors in all classrooms and terrazzo floors in the stairs and hallways, accented with marble tile borders. The school was state-of-the-art for its time, with a regulation size (for 1922) basketball court, cafeteria, and stage on the lowest level. The upper level had skylights in the rooms.

The building served as a high school until 1962. As the baby boom progressed, the building became too overcrowded, housing up to 300 students. A new high school was constructed on the village's east side. At this time, the building was saved from the wrecking ball, underwent some minor renovations, and was later used as part of the elementary school. In 1993, a new middle school opened and classes that were in Red Brick were relocated to parts of the previous middle school that had recently been vacated.

The building slipped into a state of disrepair beginning in 1993. It was being used only for storage, and important problems, such as roof leaks, went unnoticed. Red Brick was added to the National Register of Historic Places in 1998 by concerned residents who felt the building was in danger of destruction.

In the 2000s, interest in redeveloping the building was sparked. Options varying from a community center, to senior apartments were discussed. In the end, the building was sold to the Gorman Company for $29,000. After a multimillion-dollar renovation, the building's doors were opened once again in 2008.
