= Michal Beran (ice hockey) =

Slovak ice hockey player

- Born: February 22, 1973 (age 52); Martin, Czechoslovakia
- Height: 6 ft 0 in (183 cm)
- Weight: 187 lb (85 kg; 13 st 5 lb)
- Position: Forward
- Shot: Left
- Played for: HK Nitra; MHC Martin; HC Dukla Trenčín; HKm Zvolen; MsHK Žilina; Ritten Sport; Ours de Villard-de-Lans
- Playing career: 1993–2014

Michal Beran (born February 22, 1973) is a Slovak former professional ice hockey player.

== Career ==
Beran spent the majority of his career with his hometown team MHC Martin of the Slovak Extraliga. He also played for HK Nitra, HC Dukla Trenčín, HKm Zvolen and MsHK Žilina as well as spells in Italy for Ritten Sport and in France with Ours de Villard-de-Lans of the Ligue Magnus.
