= Oregon, Wisconsin =

- Village
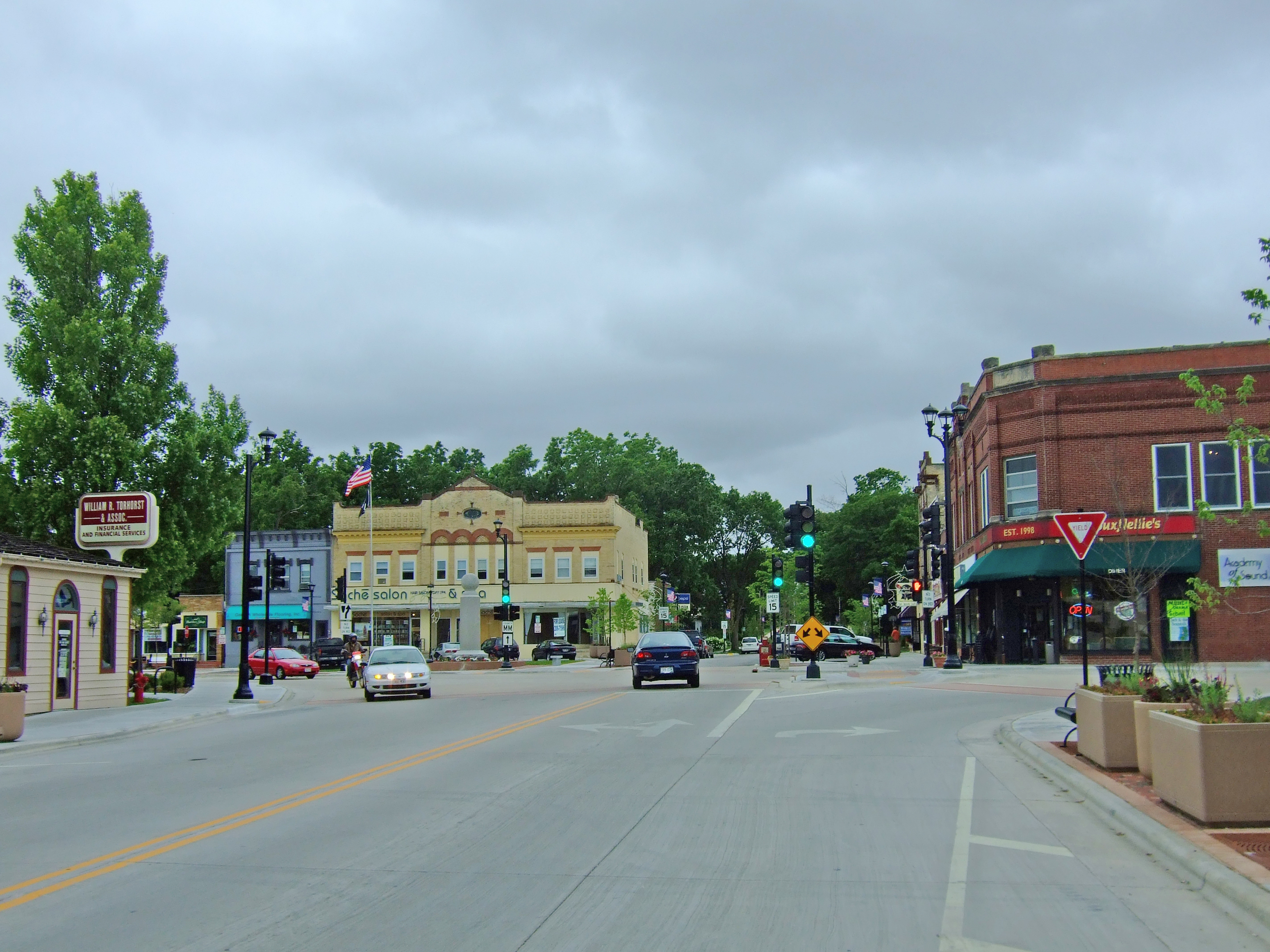
- South Main Street Historic District
- Interactive map of Oregon, Wisconsin
- Location within Wisconsin Location within the United States
- Coordinates: 42°54′16″N 89°25′47″W
- Country: United States
- State: Wisconsin
- County: Dane

Government
  - Village President: Phil Van Kampen

Area
  - Total: 4.49 sq mi (11.63 km^{2})
  - Land: 4.49 sq mi (11.63 km^{2})
  - Water: 0 sq mi (0.00 km^{2})
- Elevation: 1,053 ft (321 m)

Population (2020)
  - Total: 11,179
  - Density: 2,490/sq mi (961.5/km^{2})
- Time zone: UTC-6 (Central (CST))
  - Summer (DST): UTC-5 (CDT)
- ZIP code: 53575
- Area code: 608
- FIPS code: 55-60200
- GNIS feature ID: 1570854
- Website: oregonwi.gov

Oregon is a village in Dane County, Wisconsin, United States. The population was 11,179 at the 2020 census. A suburb south of Madison, it is part of the Madison metropolitan area. The village is located mostly within the Town of Oregon.

== History ==
The history of Oregon, Wisconsin begins at a crossroad still present today, just south of the village at Rome Corners.

Rome Corners was settled in the fall of 1841 by John Bartlett "Bartley" Runey at the intersection of the Mineral Point-Milwaukee "Old Lead Road" and the Madison-Janesville mail route.

In 1843 Bartley completed his log cabin house and was joined by his wife Margaret and 10+ children.

Bartley opened his house, a log cabin, to the community and transformed it into Runey's Tavern and Inn, which was the site of the first marriage in Oregon, between David Anthony and Jane Runey (Barley's daughter), the first church services by Methodist missionary Rev. Hawks, the first lawsuit, and was a common gathering place as the settlement grew.

In 1847, Oregon was born through a proposal by Rosell Babbit to form a separate township.

Many of Oregon's historical buildings still stand in the downtown district, including the Netherwood Block on the south, the Badger Cycle Company building and original water tower on the southeast on Janesville Street, and numerous business lining the west side of North and South Main Street. The Red Brick School, one of the more distinguishable structures in the village, built in 1922 as the high school, stands north of downtown. It was recently restored and now serves as the business offices for the Gorman Company.

The main railroad line from Chicago to Minneapolis, the Chicago and North Western Railroad came through the village in 1864.

From 1880 to 1950 the line was double tracked, but mostly abandoned between Evansville and Madison in 1996 when it was reactivated from Madison to Oregon, to serve the Lycon Concrete Plant in 2014.

== Geography ==
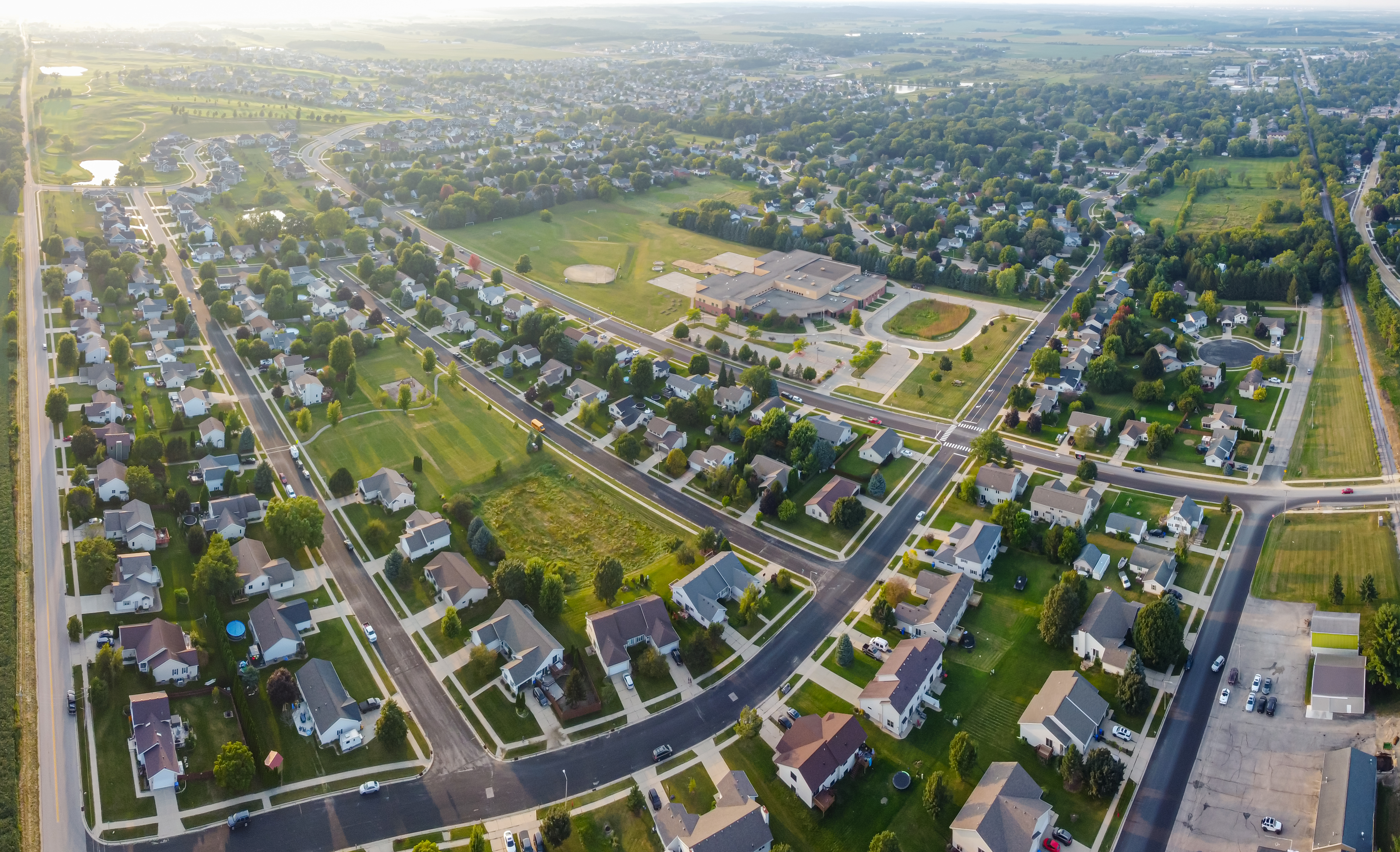
Suburban development in Oregon

Oregon is located at 42°55′26″N 89°22′56″W (42.923899, −89.382304).

According to the United States Census Bureau, the village has a total area of 4.49 square miles (11.63 km^{2}), all land.

Oregon is served primarily by U.S. Highway 14 (US 14) and Wisconsin Highway 138 (WIS 138) and the two highways meet at the village's southeastern corner. US-14 previously ran through the village, traveling down North Main Street and then arcing along Janesville Street, but a bypass was constructed from 1976 to 1978 along the northern and eastern sides of the village. The previous route is now signed as County Trunk MM.

== Demographics ==
Historical population
| Census | Pop. | Note | %± |
|---|---|---|---|
| 1880 | 527 | | — |
| 1890 | 595 | | 12.9% |
| 1900 | 697 | | 17.1% |
| 1910 | 712 | | 2.2% |
| 1920 | 871 | | 22.3% |
| 1930 | 857 | | −1.6% |
| 1940 | 1,005 | | 17.3% |
| 1950 | 1,341 | | 33.4% |
| 1960 | 1,701 | | 26.8% |
| 1970 | 2,553 | | 50.1% |
| 1980 | 3,876 | | 51.8% |
| 1990 | 4,519 | | 16.6% |
| 2000 | 7,514 | | 66.3% |
| 2010 | 9,231 | | 22.9% |
| 2020 | 11,179 | | 21.1% |
U.S. Decennial Census

=== 2020 census ===
As of the 2020 census, Oregon had a population of 11,179. The population density was 2,490.3 inhabitants per square mile (961.5/km^{2}).

The median age was 38.6 years. 27.4% of residents were under the age of 18 and 13.8% of residents were 65 years of age or older. For every 100 females there were 95.5 males, and for every 100 females age 18 and over there were 89.6 males age 18 and over.

There were 4,345 households in Oregon, of which 37.8% had children under the age of 18 living in them. Of all households, 56.3% were married-couple households, 13.2% were households with a male householder and no spouse or partner present, and 23.8% were households with a female householder and no spouse or partner present. About 23.6% of all households were made up of individuals and 10.6% had someone living alone who was 65 years of age or older.

There were 4,446 housing units at an average density of 990.4 units per square mile (382.4 units/km^{2}), of which 2.3% were vacant. The homeowner vacancy rate was 0.7% and the rental vacancy rate was 1.6%.

99.6% of residents lived in urban areas, while 0.4% lived in rural areas.

Racial composition as of the 2020 census
| Race | Number | Percent |
|---|---|---|
| White | 10,067 | 90.1% |
| Black or African American | 168 | 1.5% |
| American Indian and Alaska Native | 25 | 0.2% |
| Asian | 132 | 1.2% |
| Native Hawaiian and Other Pacific Islander | 1 | 0.0% |
| Some other race | 152 | 1.4% |
| Two or more races | 634 | 5.7% |
| Hispanic or Latino (of any race) | 443 | 4.0% |

=== 2010 census ===
As of the census of 2010, there were 9,232 people, 3,589 households, and 2,527 families living in the village. The population density was 2,088.5 inhabitants per square mile (806.4/km^{2}). There were 3,775 housing units at an average density of 854.1 units per square mile (329.8 units/km^{2}). The racial makeup of the village was 95.4% White, 1.2% African American, 0.2% Native American, 0.8% Asian, 0.2% Pacific Islander, 0.8% from other races, and 1.5% from two or more races. Hispanic or Latino of any race were 2.2% of the population.

There were 3,589 households, of which 40.8% had children under the age of 18 living with them, 55.6% were married couples living together, 10.3% had a female householder with no husband present, 4.5% had a male householder with no wife present, and 29.6% were non-families. 23.8% of all households were made up of individuals, and 7.9% had someone living alone who was 65 years of age or older. The average household size was 2.55 and the average family size was 3.04.

The median age in the village was 37 years. 28.6% of residents were under the age of 18; 6.1% were between the ages of 18 and 24; 28.8% were from 25 to 44; 26.8% were from 45 to 64; and 9.6% were 65 years of age or older. The gender makeup of the village was 47.8% male and 52.2% female.

=== 2000 census ===
As of the census of 2000, there were 7,514 people, 2,796 households, and 2,071 families living in the village. The population density was 2,451.2 people per square mile (946.4 people/km^{2}). There were 2,895 housing units at an average density of 944.4 units per square mile (364.6 units/km^{2}). The racial makeup of the village was 97.71% White, 0.56% Black or African American, 0.19% Native American, 0.67% Asian, 0.19% from other races, and 0.69% from two or more races. 0.67% of the population were Hispanic or Latino of any race.

There were 2,796 households, out of which 43.5% had children under the age of 18 living with them, 61.9% were married couples living together, 8.8% had a female householder with no husband present, and 25.9% were non-families. 20.4% of all households were made up of individuals, and 7.3% had someone living alone who was 65 years of age or older. The average household size was 2.66 and the average family size was 3.10.

In the village, the population was spread out, with 30.5% under the age of 18, 5.9% from 18 to 24, 34.5% from 25 to 44, 20.3% from 45 to 64, and 8.7% who were 65 years of age or older. The median age was 34 years. For every 100 females, there were 94.6 males. For every 100 females age 18 and over, there were 88.8 males.

The median income for a household in the village was $56,584, and the median income for a family was $65,518. Males had a median income of $43,015 versus $30,791 for females. The per capita income for the village was $23,650. About 1.8% of families and 3.3% of the population were below the poverty line, including 3.4% of those under age 18 and 10.0% of those age 65 or over.

== Education ==
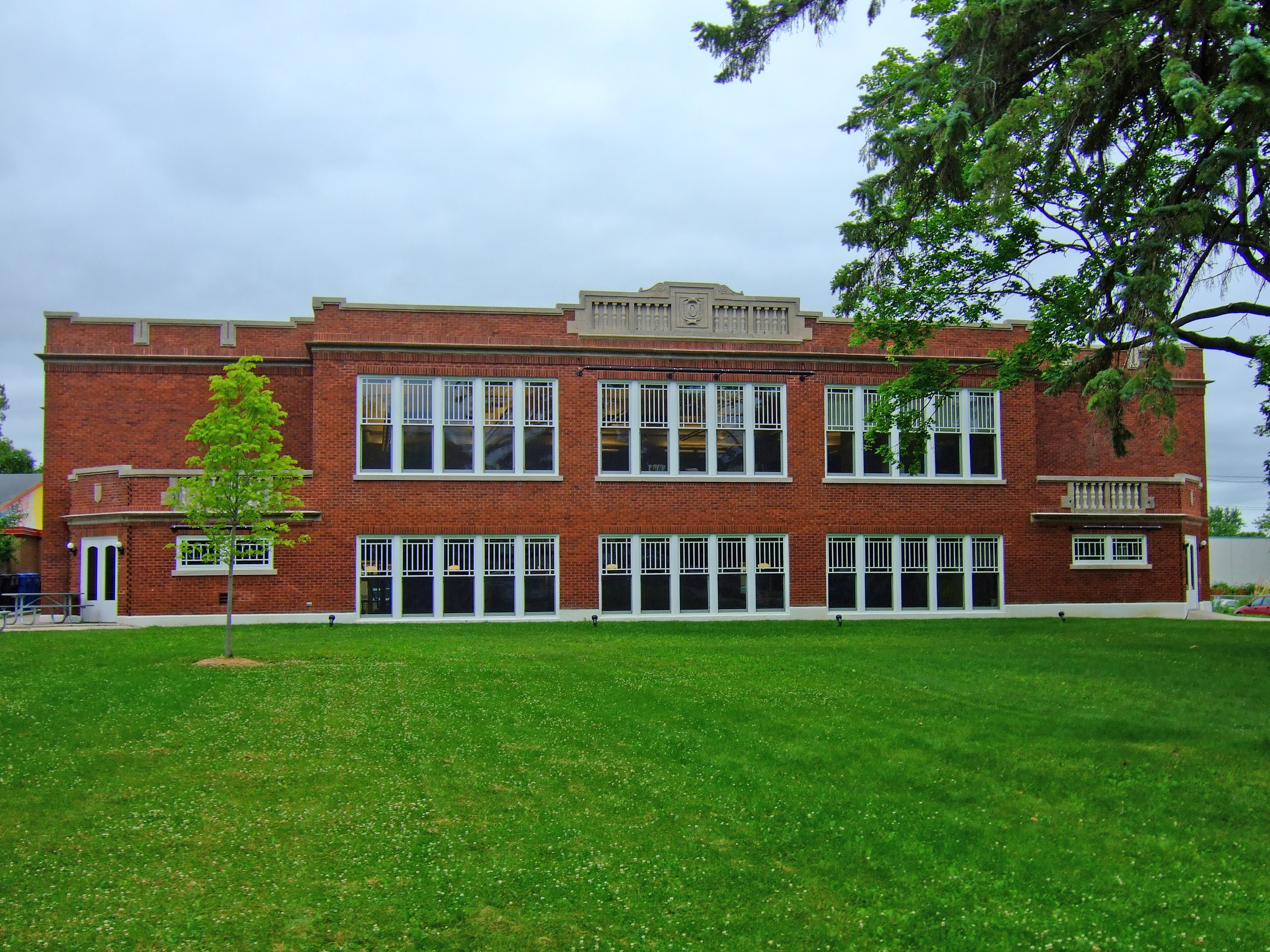
Former Oregon High School

The Oregon School District serves the area. Schools in the district include Brooklyn Elementary, Netherwood Knoll Elementary, Prairie View Elementary, Forest Edge Elementary, Rome Corners Intermediate, Oregon Middle School and Oregon High School.

One private school serves Oregon: Sursum Corda Classical School. Sursum Corda is a Christian school operated by Faith Lutheran Church.

== Notable people ==
- Dave Ahrens, former NFL linebacker for five teams
- Micah Alberti, actor and model
- Kevin J. Anderson, author
- Lyman F. Anderson, Wisconsin State Representative
- Wallace W. Andrew, Wisconsin State Representative
- Angela Drake, 2005 murder victim featured in "Investigation Discovery's 'Ice Cold Killers: Season's Grievings'".
- Jerry Frei, former head coach of the Oregon Ducks and NFL assistant coach
- Jeff Richgels, former member of the Professional Bowlers Association
- Christopher J. Rollis, newspaper editor and Wisconsin State Representative
- Jeffrey B. Skiles, Miracle on the Hudson co-pilot
- Emily E. Sloan; First woman elected to the office of county attorney in Montana
- Shaka Smart, head coach of Marquette University's men's basketball team
- Monte Smith, former professional football guard for the NFL
- Lisa Stone, former UW–Madison basketball coach
