= Dean College =

Private college in Franklin, Massachusetts, US

- Former names: Dean Academy (1865–1941); Dean Junior College (1941–1994)
- Motto: Forti et Fideli Nihil Difficile
- Type: Private college
- Established: 1865; 161 years ago
- Founder: Oliver Dean
- Academic affiliations: NECHE
- Endowment: $66.2 million (2025)
- President: Mark Boyce
- Undergraduates: 1,200
- Location: Franklin, Massachusetts, United States
- Campus: Suburban, 100 acres (40 ha)
- Colors
- Nickname: Bulldogs
- Sporting affiliations: NCAA Division III — GNAC
- Mascot: Boomer
- Website: dean.edu
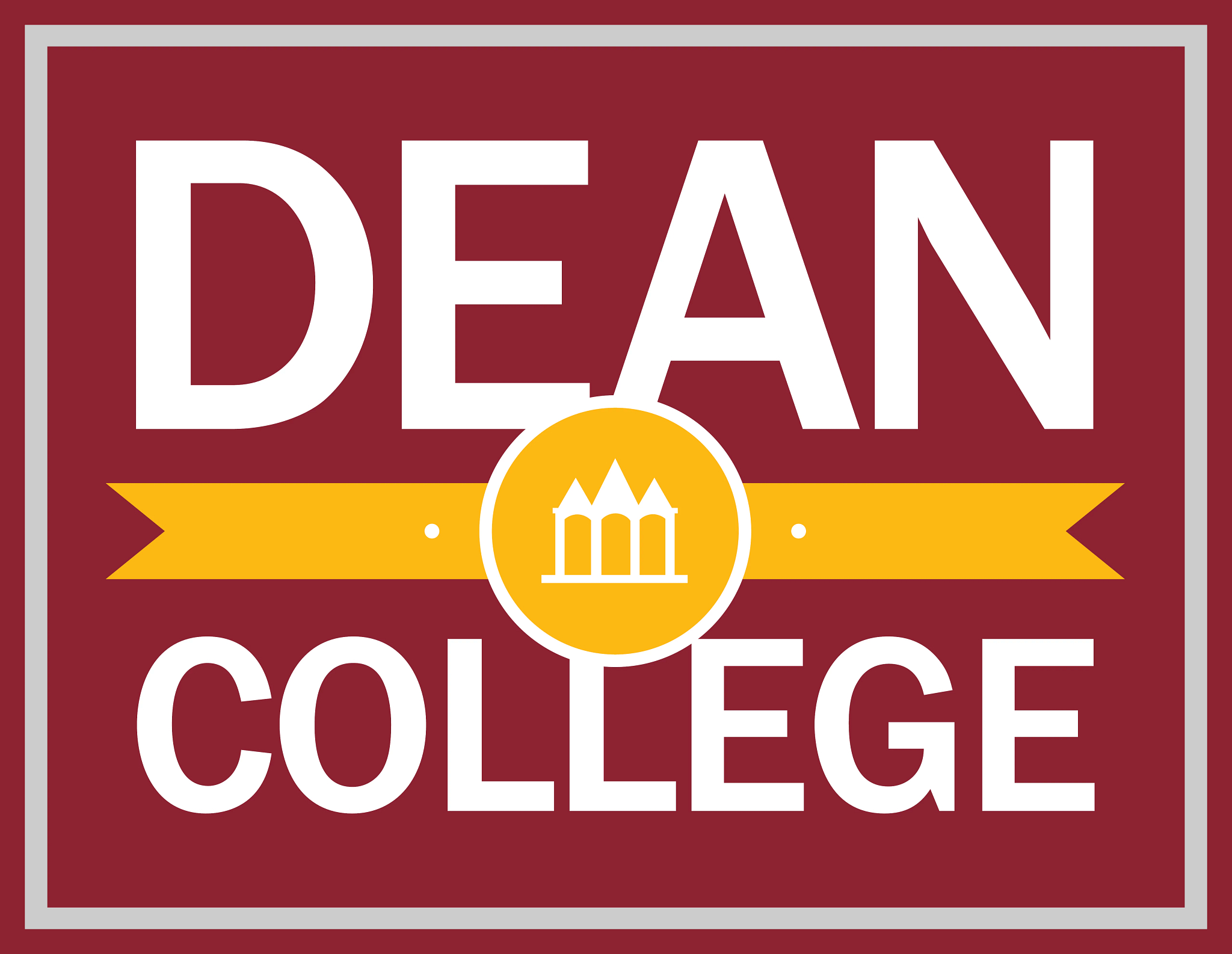
- Dean College Historic District
- U.S. National Register of Historic Places
- U.S. Historic district
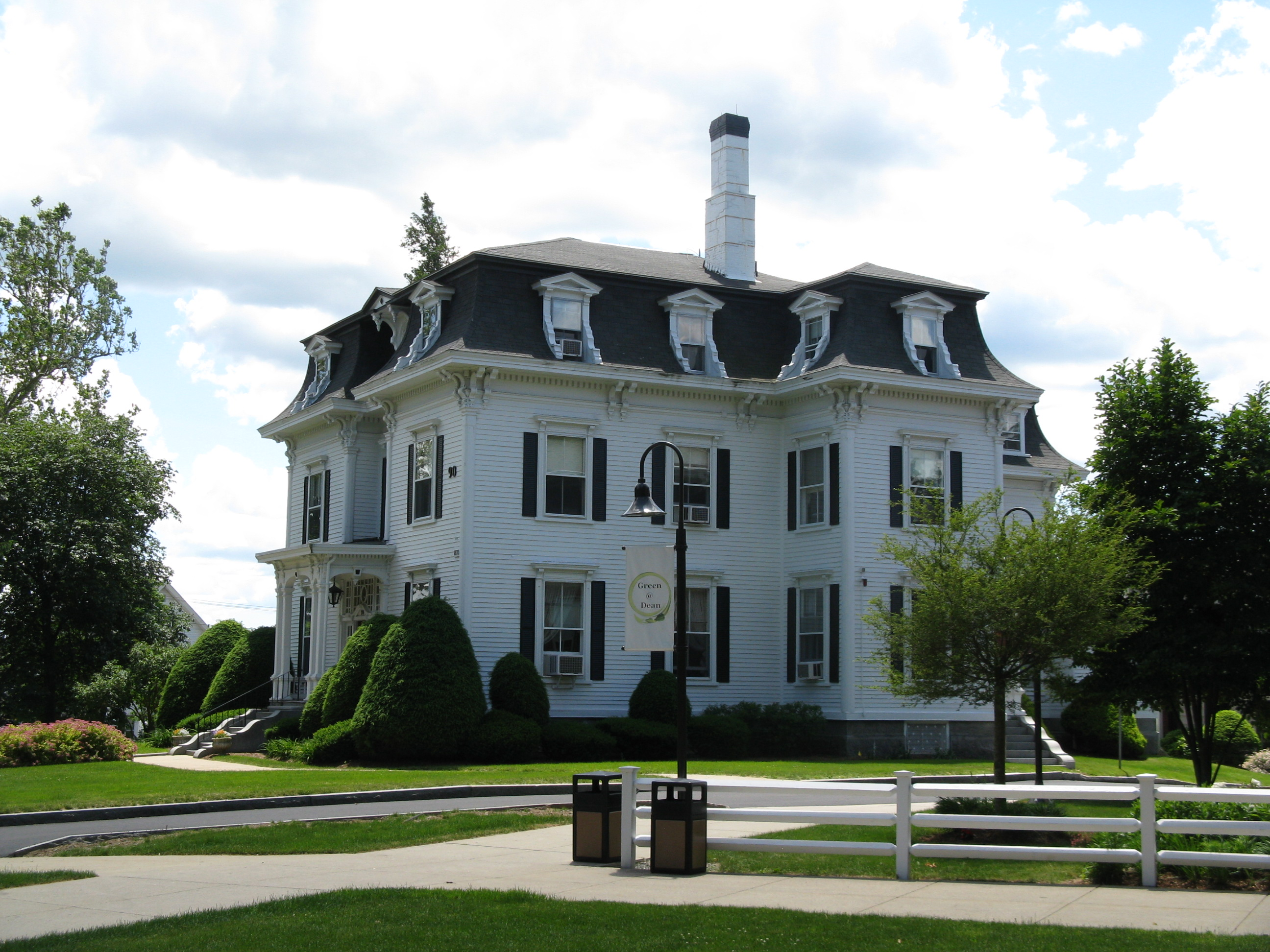
- Ray Mansion, Dean College Admissions Building

- Location within Massachusetts Location within the United States
- Coordinates: 42°5′7″N 71°23′56″W
- Built: 1870
- Architectural style: Classical Revival, Stick/Eastlake, Queen Anne
- NRHP reference No.: 75000285
- Added to NRHP: April 23, 1975

Dean College is a private college in Franklin, Massachusetts. It offers bachelor's degrees, associate degrees, and certificates.

== History ==
Dean College was founded by Oliver Dean as a co-educational academy, Dean Academy, in 1865. He gave the school approximately nine acres of land and donated $125,000 towards its construction. The first class at Dean Academy was on October 1, 1866, with 44 students attending at the local Universalist Church.

The main building of the Academy, Dean Hall, was completed in 1868. During the summer of 1872, it was destroyed by a fire, but reconstruction began and finished on June 7, 1874.

The school's name changed twice, to Dean Junior College in May 1941 and then Dean College in May 1994. The school's academic mascot is a bulldog named Boomer.

== Campus ==
The 100-acre (0.40 km^{2}) campus includes Dean Hall, the college's oldest structure which houses classrooms, radio station Power 88 WGAO, offices, athletics offices, basketball/volleyball gymnasium, the Center for Student Administrative Services (CSAS), Campus Safety, video production studios/classrooms, the president's office and board room, and two floors of student residences. In 2011, Dean College unveiled a new campus center.

Dean has completed over $60 million in campus improvements over the past 10 years, including Dorothy and Glendon Horne '31 Hall, Green Family Library Learning Commons, Morton Family Learning Center, athletic field updates (press box, scoreboards, dugouts), Grant Field renovation, and the Rooney Shaw Center for Innovation in Teaching.

There are 13 different residence halls on campus, including furnished condominiums in downtown Franklin, suite-style living, all-female residence halls, all-male residence halls and co-ed residence halls.

Dean College offers bachelor's degree and associate degree programs within four schools: School of the Arts, Dean R. Sanders '47 School of Business, Joan Phelps Palladino School of Dance, and School of Liberal Arts. Dean also offers part-time continuing studies options to serve students who wish to pursue their education on a part-time basis. Part-time students may also enroll in certificate programs.

== Athletics ==
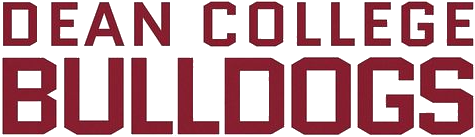
Dean Bulldogs wordmark

The school has 16 athletic teams, known as Bulldogs. They participate in Division III of the NCAA in the following sports:

Upon transition into the NCAA, they accepted membership for all sports into the Great Northeast Athletic Conference except for football.

They accepted membership into the Eastern Collegiate Football Conference. Dean College students also participate in intramural sports.

=== Varsity teams ===
| Men's sports | Women's sports |
|---|---|
| Baseball | Basketball |
| Basketball | Cross country |
| Cross country | Field hockey |
| Football | Golf |
| Golf | Lacrosse |
| Lacrosse | Soccer |
| Soccer | Softball |
| Volleyball | Volleyball |

== Notable people ==
=== Alumni ===
- Richard Belzer, actor, stand-up comedian, and author
- Broderick Crawford, Academy Award-winning actor
- Jack Cronin, professional football player
- Greg Dickerson, sportscaster
- Zachary Dixon, professional football player
- Sage Francis, hip hop recording artist and spoken word poet
- Eddie Grant, lawyer, professional baseball player, U.S. soldier during World War I, and namesake of Grant Field at Dean College
- William D. Green, business executive
- Walt Handelsman, editorial cartoonist
- Gabby Hartnett, professional baseball player
- Doc Hazelton, professional baseball player and college coach
- Eric Holtz, basketball coach
- James Gordon Irving, natural-history illustrator
- Emilie Baker Loring, romance novelist
- Andrae Murphy, American football player and coach
- Kodo Nishimura, Japanese Buddhist monk, and makeup artist
- Steven Sonntag, NFL cheerleader
- Baran Süzer, Turkish businessman
- Joe Swan, Guitarist
- Thomas Paolino, politician
- Lucky Whitehead, professional football player
- Francis H. Woodward, politician
- Maury Youmans, professional football player

=== Faculty ===
- John Clarence Lee, science instructor in 1876-77; later president of St. Lawrence University and Lombard University; Universalist pastor

== See also ==
- Dean Bulldogs football
- National Register of Historic Places listings in Norfolk County, Massachusetts
