= Franklin, Massachusetts =

- City
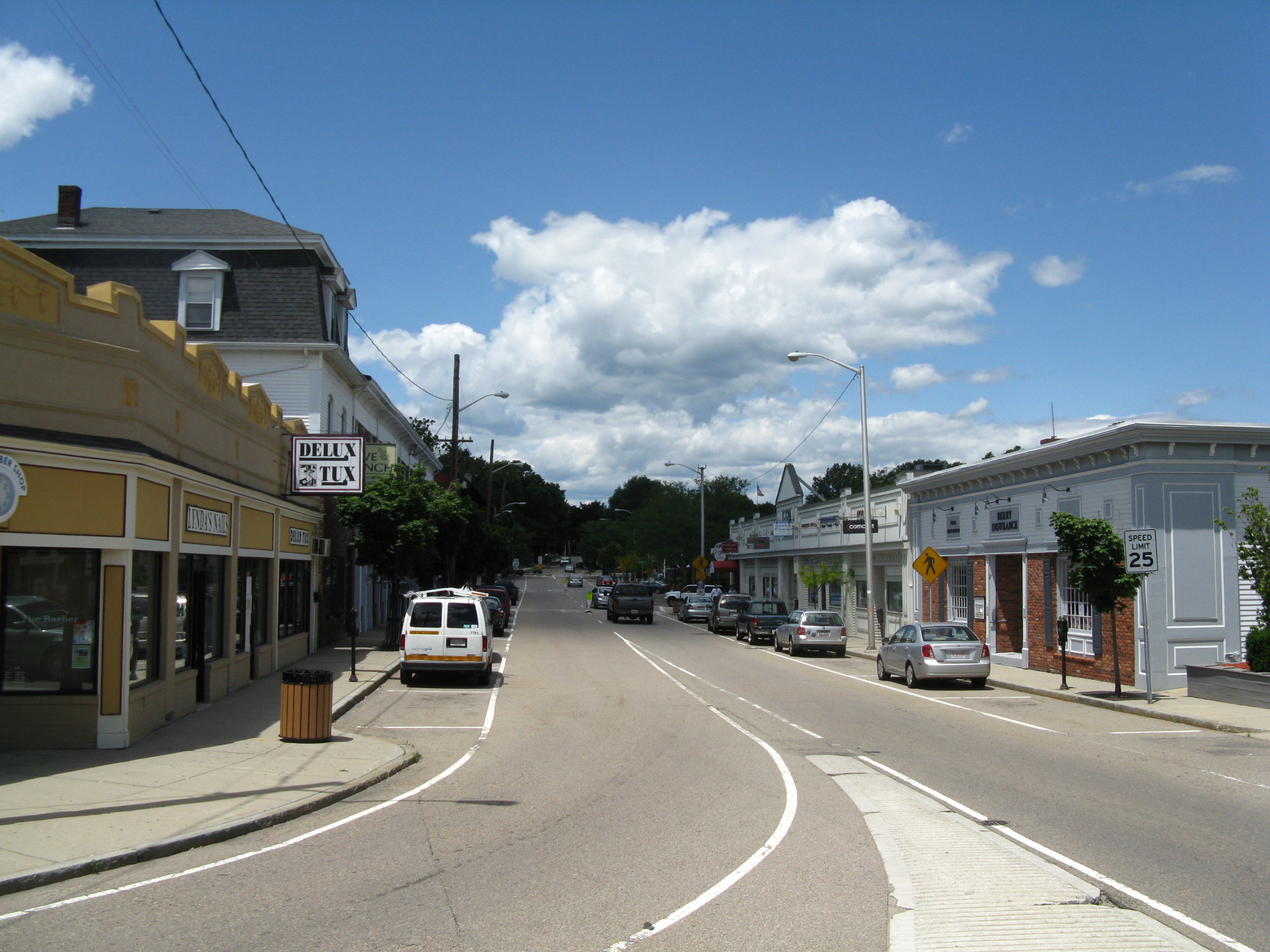
- Main Street in 2010

- Seal
- Motto: Industry Need Not Wish
- Location in Norfolk County in Massachusetts

- Location in the United States
- Coordinates: 42°05′N 71°24′W
- Country: United States
- State: Massachusetts
- County: Norfolk
- Settled: 1660
- Incorporated: 1778

Government
  - Type: Council-manager
  - Town Administrator: Jamie Hellen

Area
  - Total: 27.03 sq mi (70.00 km^{2})
  - Land: 26.64 sq mi (68.99 km^{2})
  - Water: 0.39 sq mi (1.01 km^{2})
- Elevation: 299 ft (91 m)

Population (2020)
  - Total: 33,261
  - Density: 1,248.6/sq mi (482.08/km^{2})
- Time zone: UTC−5 (Eastern)
  - Summer (DST): UTC−4 (Eastern)
- ZIP Code: 02038
- Area code: 508/774
- FIPS code: 25-25100
- GNIS feature ID: 0611686
- Website: www.franklinma.gov

The Town of Franklin is a city in Norfolk County, Massachusetts, United States. Franklin is one of thirteen Massachusetts municipalities that have applied for, and been granted, city forms of government but wish to retain "The town of" in their official names. As of 2022, the city's population was 36,745, with a growth rate of 15.38% since 2015. It is home to the country's first public library, the Franklin Public Library, its first books having been donated by Benjamin Franklin in 1790. It also contains the largest Catholic parish in the Boston Archdiocese, St. Mary's Catholic church, with some 15,000 members.

== History ==
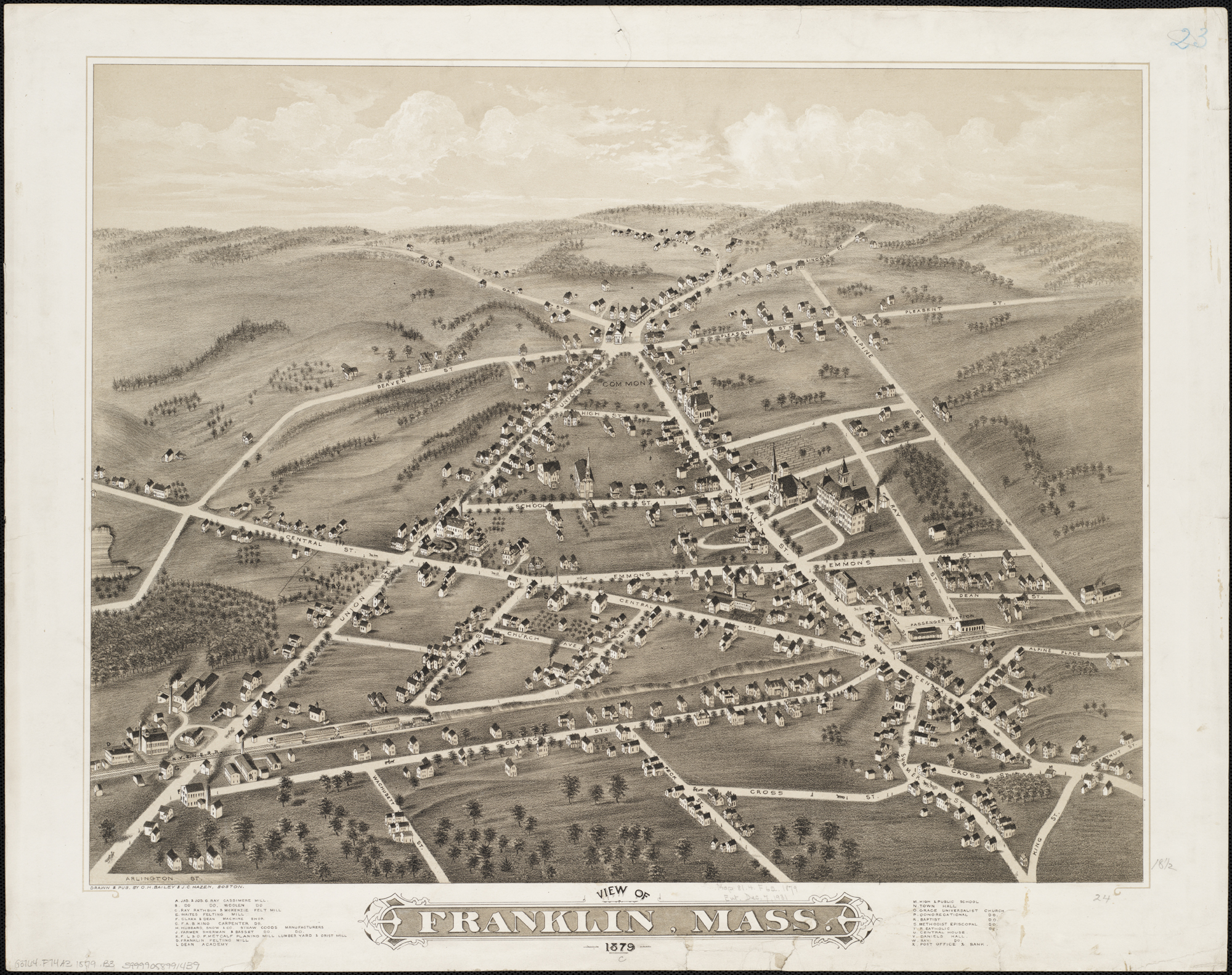
Franklin, Massachusetts in 1879

Franklin was first settled by Europeans in 1660 and officially incorporated during the American Revolution. The town was formed from the western part of the town of Wrentham, and it was officially incorporated on March 2, 1778; its designated name at incorporation was to be Exeter. However, the town's citizens opted to call it Franklin, in honor of the statesman Benjamin Franklin, the first municipality in the United States to be so named.

It was hoped that Benjamin Franklin would donate a bell for a church steeple in the town, but he donated 116 books instead, including Night-Thoughts, James Janeway's Invisible Realities, and the works of John Locke. On November 20, 1790, it was decided that the volumes would be lent to the residents of Franklin for free via its library, which has been in operation since then as the Franklin Public Library making this the oldest running public library in the nation. The Ray Memorial Library building was dedicated in 1904. In 1990, on the library's bicentennial, its staff published a booklet, "A History of America's First Public Library at Franklin Massachusetts, 1790 ~ 1990" to commemorate America's first public library and book collection.

The town is also home to the birthplace of America's father of public education, Horace Mann. The town is also home to what may have been the nation's oldest continuously operational one-room school house (Croydon, New Hampshire's school dates to 1780, but there is debate as to whether it is truly "one room"). The Red Brick School was started in 1792, its building constructed in 1833, and was operational until 2008. St. Mary's Catholic Church, located in central Franklin and built by Matthew Sullivan, is the largest Catholic parish in the Boston Archdiocese with some 15,000 members.

== Geography ==
Franklin is located at 42°5′N 71°24′W (42.0891, –71.4069). According to the U.S. Census Bureau, the town has a total area of 27.0 square miles (70 km^{2}), of which 26.7 square miles (69 km^{2}) is land and 0.3 square miles (0.78 km^{2}) is water.

Much of the Town of Franklin lies within the Charles River watershed. Principal streams include Mine, Shepard's, Miller, Uncas, Dix and Miscoe Brooks. Much of the marshland along Mine Brook has been permanently protected by the Natural Valley Storage Project of the U.S. Army Corps of Engineers. The extreme southwestern corner of Franklin is part of the Blackstone River watershed. The town has an impounded series of lakes known as the Franklin Reservoir, which is not used as a public drinking water supply. The lakes are now protected open space.

Ernest DelCarte (1911–2000) bequeathed the land that would become the conservation area to the Town of Franklin. The DelCarte family assisted in the transfer to Franklin in return for the town's commitment to preserve the land as open space. Worth an estimated $3 million at the time of the transfer of title, the Recreation and Conservation Area received a multi-million-dollar upgrade in 2014. Significant public forests and parks include the Franklin State and the Franklin Town Forests.

=== Climate ===
Climate data for Franklin, MA (1991–2020, coordinates:41.0792°N 71.4094°W)
Month	Jan	Feb	Mar	Apr	May	Jun	Jul	Aug	Sep	Oct	Nov	Dec	Year
Average precipitation inches (mm)	3.95 (100)	3.51 (89)	4.73 (120)	4.51 (115)	3.58 (91)	4.45 (113)	3.63 (92)	3.86 (98)	4.11 (104)	4.93 (125)	4.08 (104)	4.92 (125)	50.26 (1,276)
Average snowfall inches (cm)	10.4 (26)	14.9 (38)	10.7 (27)	1.2 (3.0)	0.0 (0.0)	0.0 (0.0)	0.0 (0.0)	0.0 (0.0)	0.0 (0.0)	0.2 (0.51)	1.4 (3.6)	8.9 (23)	47.7 (121.11)
Average precipitation days (≥ 0.01 in)	10.7	9.0	10.6	11.3	12.3	11.3	9.9	9.3	9.0	11.3	9.8	10.8	125.3
Average snowy days (≥ 0.01 in)	4.5	3.8	2.8	0.3	0	0	0	0	0	0	0.5	2.6	14.5
Source: NOAA

== Demographics ==
Historical population
Year	Pop.	±%
1790	1,101	—
1850	1,810	+64.4%
1860	2,172	+20.0%
1870	2,512	+15.7%
1880	4,051	+61.3%
1890	4,831	+19.3%
1900	5,017	+3.9%
1910	5,641	+12.4%
1920	6,497	+15.2%
1930	7,028	+8.2%
1940	7,303	+3.9%
1950	8,037	+10.1%
1960	10,530	+31.0%
1970	17,830	+69.3%
1980	18,217	+2.2%
1990	22,095	+21.3%
2000	29,560	+33.8%
2010	31,635	+7.0%
2020	33,261	+5.1%
2024	33,742	+1.4%
* = population estimate. Source: United States census records and Population Estimates Program data. Source: U.S. Decennial Census

As of the 2010 census, there were 31,852 people, 10,866 households, and 7,877 families residing in the town. The population density was 1,105.4 inhabitants per square mile (426.8/km^{2}). There were 10,327 housing units at an average density of 386.2 per square mile (149.1/km^{2}). The racial makeup of the city was 92.8 percent White, 3.83 percent Asian or Pacific Islander, 2.0 percent Hispanic or Latino of any race, 1.4 percent Black or African American, 0.15 percent Native American, 0.29 percent from other races, and 1.4% from two or more races.

There were 10,866 households, out of which 44.6% had children under the age of 18 living with them, 66.4% contained married couples living together, 22.4% were non-families, and 8.5% had a female householder with no husband present. 18.3% of all households were made up of individuals, and 6.7% had someone living alone 65 years of age or older. The average household size was 2.80, the average family size 3.29.

The population includes 28.5% under the age of 18, 6.5% from 18 to 24, 35.1% from 25 to 44, 19.9% from 45 to 64, and 9.4% who were 65 years of age or older. The median age was 35 years. For every 100 females, there were 96.1 males. For every 100 females age 18 and over, there were 93.4 males.

The median household income in the town was $92,066, and the median income for a family was $81,826 (these figures had risen to $89,659 and $101,900, respectively, as of a 2008 estimate)). Men had a median income of $58,888 versus $36,557 for women; the per capita income for the town was $27,849. About 2.2% of families and 3.6% of the population were below the poverty line, including 2.8% of those under 18 and 5.2% of those 65 or over.

65.5% of Franklin residents claim to be religious, of that 54.2% are Catholic, 3.0% are Jewish, 2.2% are Presbyterian, 1.7% are Episcopalian, while members of Baptist, Lutheran, Methodist, Buddhist, Pentecostal, Mormon, Hindu, Mennonite, and Muslim faiths make up less than 1.0% of the population each.

== Government ==
The town is represented in the Massachusetts General Court by Representative Jeffrey Roy of the 10th Norfolk district and Senator Becca Rausch of the Norfolk, Worcester and Middlesex district.

The Town is located in Massachusetts's 4th congressional district and is currently represented by Jake Auchincloss.

== Education ==
The Franklin Public Schools have five elementary schools serving K–5, 4 middle schools serving 6-8, and 1 high school serving 9–12. There is one charter school (grades K–8).

Elementary Schools K–5:

- Lincoln Street Elementary
- Washington Street Elementary
- The Red Brick School is a historic school in the town. It was used at various times for kindergarten through 4th grade students; sometimes for multiple grades simultaneously. It was one of the longest running one-room schools in the USA.
- Benjamin Franklin Classical Charter Public School (K-8)

Middle Schools 6-8:

- Franklin Middle School
- Benjamin Franklin Classical Charter Public School (K-8)

High Schools 9–12:

- Franklin High School constructed a new high school building and tore down the old one in 2014.
- Tri-County Regional Vocational Technical High School, considered part of its own school district and accepting students from numerous other towns in the area. Construction on a new building is underway while school is still in session.

The Town of Franklin is also home to Dean College, founded in 1865, a private residential college with over 1,100 students. The college grants associate degrees in a number of subjects (98% of the students are accepted for transfer to four-year schools) and also offers bachelor's programs in Arts and Entertainment Management, Psychology, Sociology, History, English, Business, Marketing, Criminal Justice and Homeland Security Management, Sport Management, Sport Fitness, Recreation and Coaching, Dance, Liberal Arts & Studies, and Theater.

== Points of interest ==
As noted, the Franklin Public Library is the first public library in America, the original books of which were donated by Benjamin Franklin. Across the street from the library is Dean College.

At one end of Franklin's Historic District is the little Red Brick School. Its classroom, believed to be one of the oldest public schools in the United States, but is not still functioning, celebrated its 175th birthday in 2008.

== Transportation ==
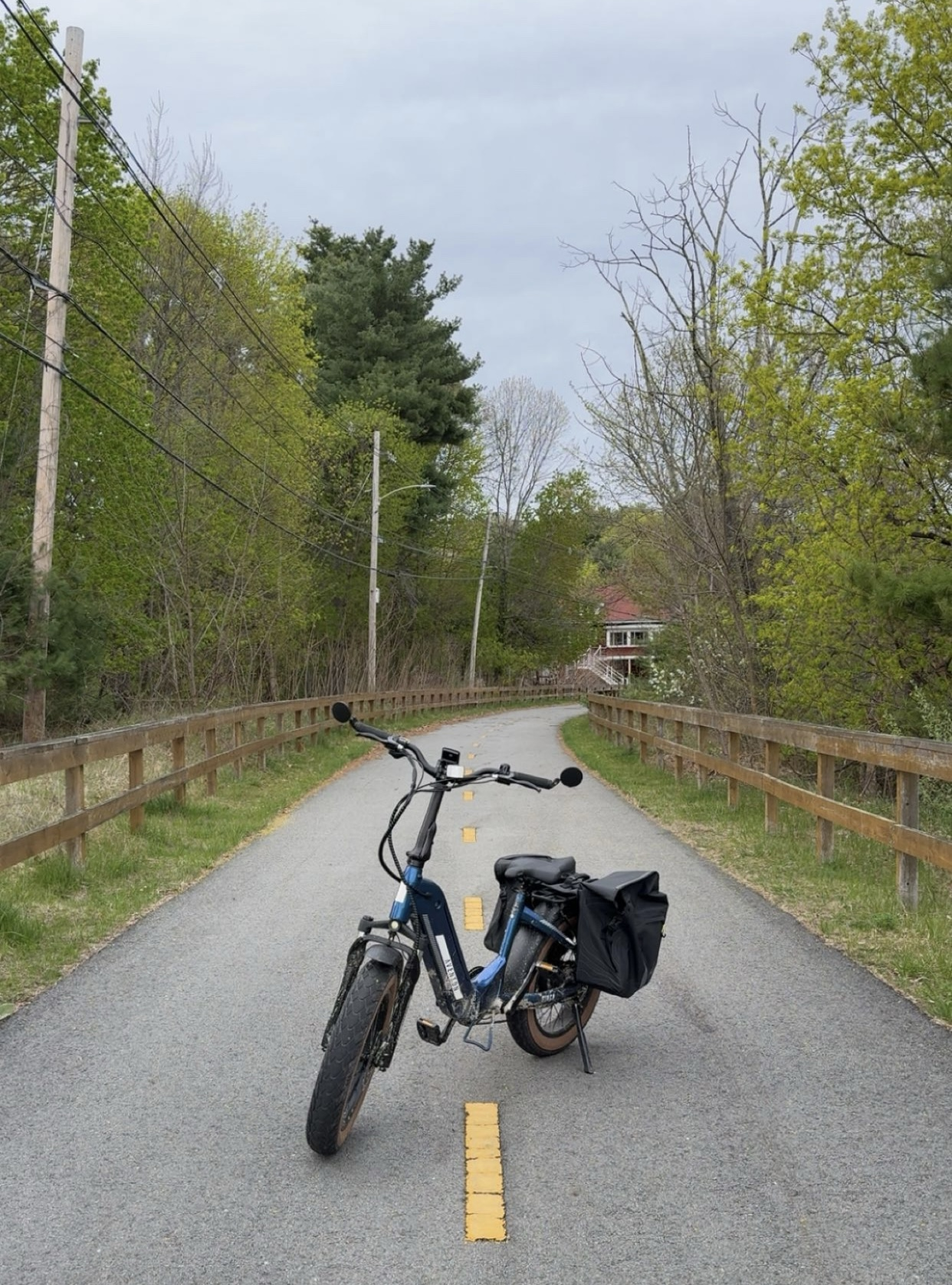
A short bike trail was built in 2017 to replace the West Central Street bridge

Franklin has two exits along I-495, at Route 140 and King Street. MBTA Commuter Rail service on the Franklin/Foxboro Line stops at Forge Park/495 and Franklin. Franklin is part of the Greater Attleboro Taunton Regional Transit Authority (GATRA) service region. It is served by demand-responsive transit.

The northern end of the Southern New England Trunkline Trail is at Grove Street. There are plans to extend the trail to downtown Franklin.

The West Central Street Bridge over the Franklin Line railroad tracks was closed to traffic in 2008 and replaced with a smaller bridge carrying a shared-use path in 2017.

== Notable people ==
- Charles Partridge Adams, born in Franklin, 1858; landscape painter, Gold Medal of National Mining and Industrial Exposition, Denver, for landscape
- Asa Aldis, Chief Justice of the Vermont Supreme Court
- Maria Barrett, US Army Major General; elder sister of US Army General Paula Lodi
- Edward Reed Blake, born in Franklin; Wisconsin state legislator and businessman
- Al Boucher, born in Franklin, 1881; former professional baseball player
- Gordie Browne, born in Franklin, 1951; former professional football player
- John Callahan, resident, former professional wrestler.
- Elliott Connie, psychotherapist, author, host of "The Elliott Connie Show", and social media content creator, lived in Franklin
- Bernard Davis, (1916–1994), biologist, was born in Franklin
- Oliver Dean, born in Franklin, 1783; physician and educator, benefactor and founder of Dean Academy
- Nathanael Emmons, (1745–1840) Congregational minister, theologian
- George Warren Fuller, born in Franklin, 1868; responsible for important innovations in water and wastewater treatment
- Eddie Grant, born in 1883; former professional baseball player, killed in WWI
- Richard Grieco, Class of 1983, actor and former fashion model
- Murray Hill, comedian, drag king
- Shelby Hogan, soccer player
- Kristi Kirshe, American rugby sevens player
- Peter Laviolette, born in 1964 and grew up in Franklin; professional ice hockey player and coach – NHL hockey coach
- Paula Lodi, US Army Brigadier General; younger sister of US Army General Maria Barrett
- Horace Mann, born in Franklin, 1796; educator
- Theron Metcalf, born in Franklin, 1784; Associate Justice of the Massachusetts Supreme Judicial Court
- Robbie O'Connell, folk singer, former resident of Franklin
- Jen O'Malley Dillon, political strategist and campaign manager
- Albert D. Richardson, born in Franklin, 1833; journalist, spy, and author
- Jermaine Samuels, basketball player, grew up in Franklin
- Bobby Santos III, born in Franklin, 1985; NASCAR driver
- Ilario Zannino, mobster, former resident of Franklin

== General and cited references ==
- McCarthy Earls, Eamon (2012). Franklin: From Puritan Precinct to 21st Century Edge City. Franklin: Via Appia Press (www.viaappiapress.com). ISBN 978-0-9825485-4-7.
