= Anna Paulina Luna =

American politician (born 1989)

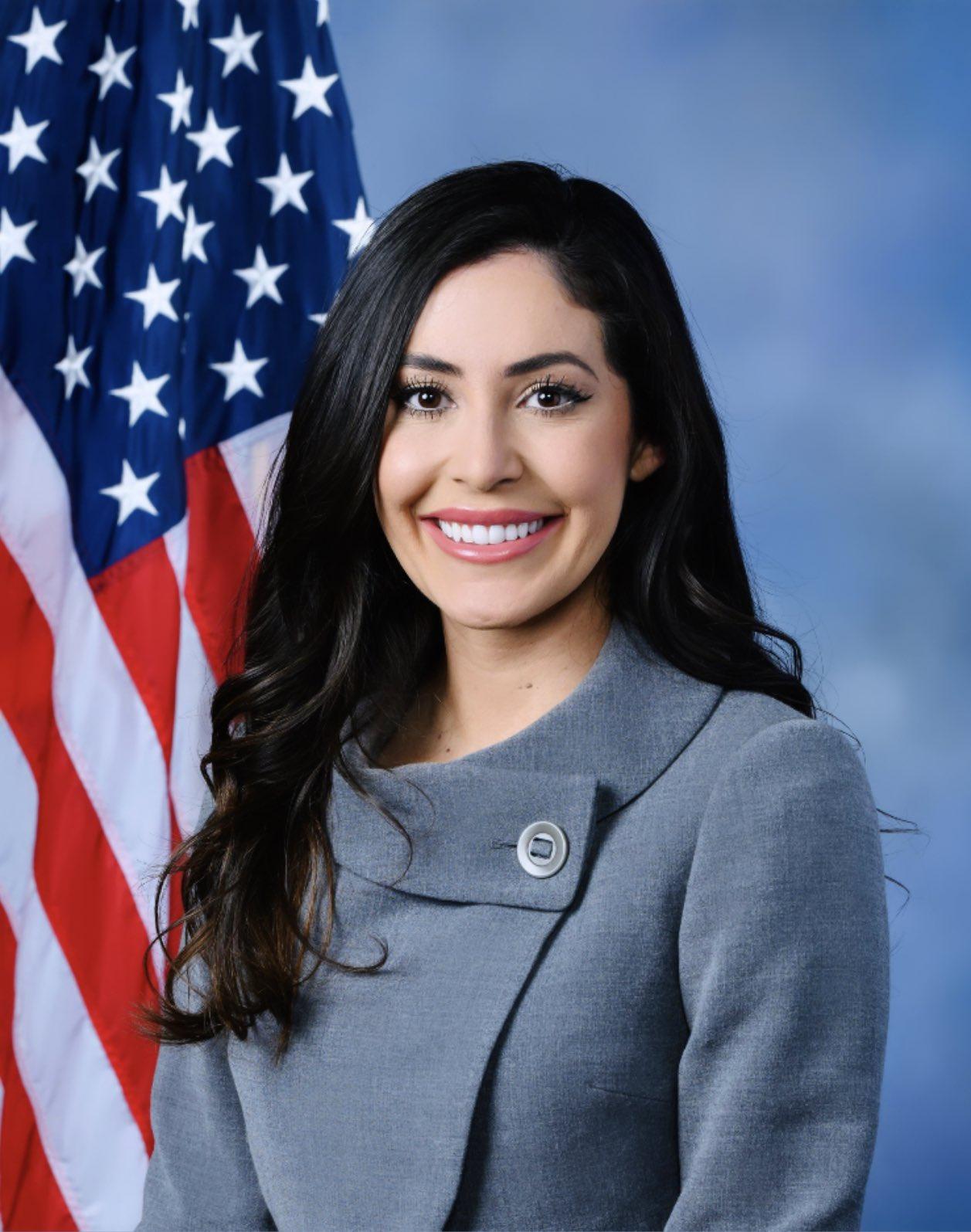
- Official portrait, 2022

Member of the U.S. House of Representatives from Florida's 13th district
- Incumbent
- Assumed office January 3, 2023
- Preceded by: Charlie Crist

Personal details
- Born: Anna Paulina Mayerhofer; May 6, 1989 (age 37) Santa Ana, California, U.S.
- Party: Republican
- Spouse: Andrew Gamberzky
- Children: 1
- Education: University of West Florida (BS)
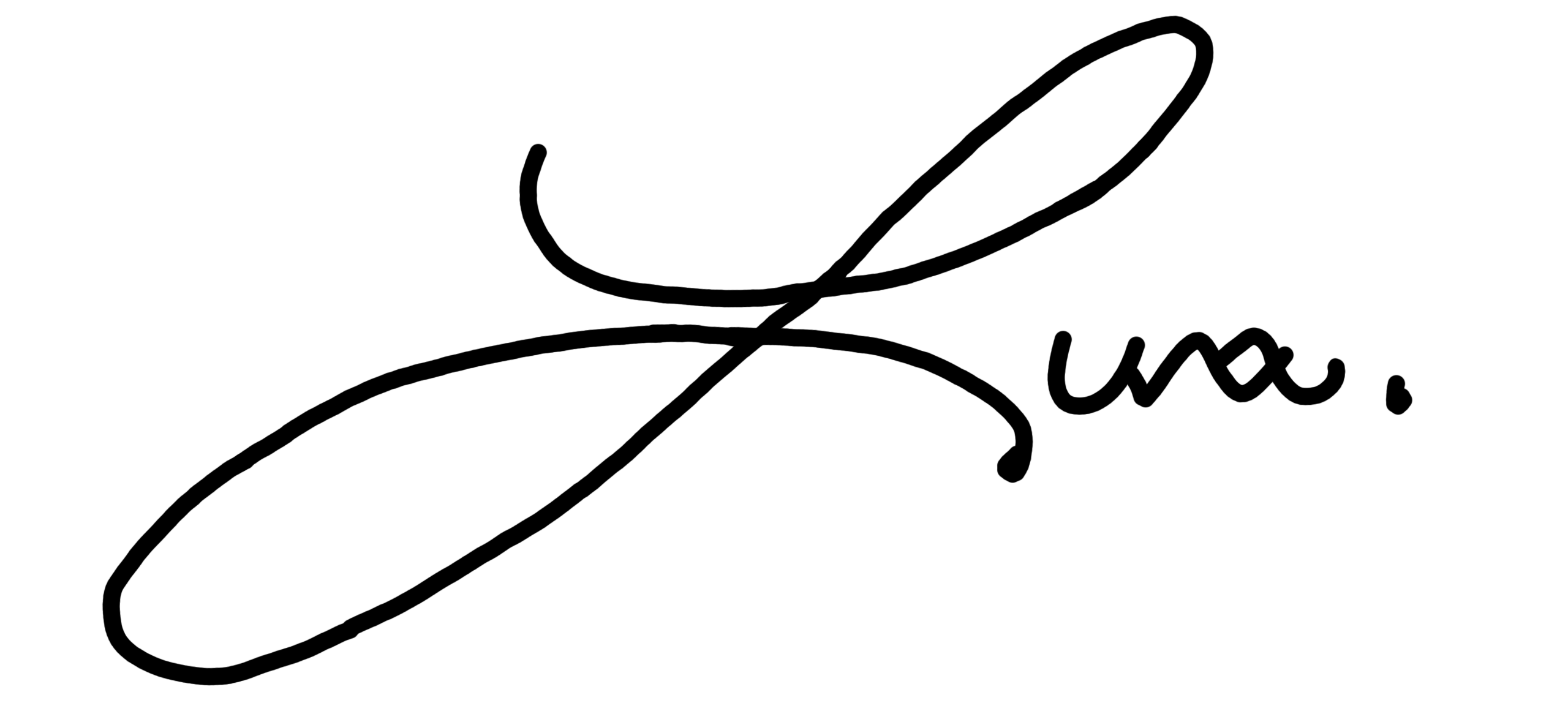
- Signature
- Website: House website Campaign website

Military service
- Allegiance: United States
- Branch/service: United States Air Force; Air National Guard
- Years of service: 2009–2014
- Rank: Senior airman
- Unit: Missouri Air National Guard; Oregon Air National Guard; Florida Air National Guard
- Awards: Air Force Achievement Medal

Anna Paulina Luna (née Mayerhofer; born May 6, 1989) is an American politician and Air Force veteran serving as the U.S. representative for Florida's 13th congressional district since 2023. A member of the Republican Party, she is the first Mexican-American woman elected to Congress from Florida.

Luna served as airfield management specialist in the Air National Guard from age 19, serving from 2009 to 2014. For her service, she was awarded the Air Force Achievement Medal. Luna graduated from the University of West Florida in 2017. In her first campaign, Luna challenged, and lost to, incumbent Democratic congressman Charlie Crist in 2020. Luna was subsequently elected to the U.S. House of Representatives in 2022, with the endorsement of then-former president Donald Trump in the Republican primary. Luna was re-elected in 2024.

Luna serves on the House Committee on Foreign Affairs and the House Committee on Oversight and Government Reform.

== Early life and family ==
Anna Paulina Mayerhofer was born on May 6, 1989, to George Mayerhofer and Monica Todd, an elementary school teacher and stay-at-home mother, in Santa Ana, California. Luna has said that her father raised her to follow Messianic Judaism, an evangelical movement that incorporates Jewish traditions into Protestant Christianity, and that she is "a small fraction Ashkenazi". Members of her extended family have denied this claim, saying her father was Catholic, and that "they were not aware of him practicing any form of Judaism while Luna was growing up". Her mother has said that Luna's father was a Christian who "embraced the Messianic faith" after getting clean from drug addiction. Her grandfather, Heinrich Mayerhofer, identified as Catholic when he immigrated to Canada from Germany in 1954.

Her father had Mexican and German ancestry. Her paternal grandmother was born in Hidalgo, Mexico. Her paternal grandfather was born in Germany and was in the Wehrmacht during World War II. Her mother has Mexican-American ancestry, although a maternal great-grandfather was the son of an American immigrant to Mexico and a native of Colima, Mexico. Her two maternal great-grandfathers served in the United States Armed Forces during World War II.

Luna's parents never married or lived together; her father had a drug addiction problem, her mother married another man when Luna was nine years old but divorced four years later. Luna was raised in the Orange County cities of Santa Ana, Irvine, and Aliso Viejo, as well as Los Angeles, and has called Santa Monica her hometown. She attended high school in Los Angeles.

Luna said that at the age of 10, she found her father's bag of meth. Her maternal grandmother was a long-time heroin user and was HIV positive. By 2020, she (Anna) and her mother (Monica) had chosen the Luna surname as "an homage" to that woman's maiden name.

Luna has said that she "grew up in the welfare system", raised by her mother on government assistance with "no family to rely on", and was raised in a "broken home mentality". Luna has said that both she and her mother lacked "a strong extended network of people" who could help care for them, and that she had attended "over six high schools" before graduating. Luna's cousin has said, "The whole family kind of raised her—my dad was a part of her life when she was younger and we all kind of coddled her ... She was always a part of everything, all these family gatherings and activities". Luna's aunt said, "She had everything. What she needed and more ... And not only did [Luna's mother] provide for her, but [Luna's grandfather] did, too." Luna has disputed these accounts, saying that she "barely spent any time with them in her entire life". Luna's mother said that she (Monica) had to rely on welfare for periods of time, especially while she was putting herself through college at the University of California, Irvine, and then at the UCLA School of Law, and that she was the only source of meaningful financial support for the family.

Luna's campaign website biography says that throughout her childhood and teenage years, her father "spent time in and out of incarceration", and that she communicated with him "through letters to jail and collect calls". Luna's mother and aunt said that he served several short stints in jail for not paying child support. Luna's mother also said that he spent at least one year in jail for a drug-related charge. Luna's father was sentenced to Orange County jail on at least five different occasions. He was convicted for crimes including carrying a loaded gun in public, violating probation, and driving with a suspended license. He was charged but not convicted for assault and battery and possession of illegal drugs. The drug possession case indicated that Luna's father was in custody around the time of two court appearances. The case information did not specify the length of his confinement; the court proceedings lasted about three months.

== Military service, education, and early career ==
Luna served in the U.S. Air Force from 2009 to 2014 as an airfield management specialist, at Whiteman Air Force Base in Missouri and Hurlburt Field in Florida. Her decorations included the Air Force Achievement Medal. She subsequently joined the Oregon Air National Guard.

While in the Air Force, she began studying at a local college. She also modeled during this period, appearing in 2013's Sports Illustrated's online site, and briefly worked as a cocktail waitress in a strip club. She later appeared as a swimsuit model in Maxim magazine in 2014. Luna gained a following as an Instagram influencer.

Luna said that she experienced a 2010 early morning home invasion by her landlord while stationed at Whiteman Air Force Base. Luna's roommate said she did not remember such an incident. Instead, the roommate recalled a daytime break-in when Luna was not home. A Warrensburg Police Department report described the July 2010 incident as a "burglary not in progress".

In 2017, Luna earned a Bachelor of Science in biology from the University of West Florida.

Luna became the director of Hispanic engagement for Turning Point USA in 2018. In a November 2018 Fox News segment, she compared Hillary Clinton to herpes, leading the network to cut the segment short and host Rick Leventhal and anchor Arthel Neville to apologize to viewers. In 2020, she appeared at a We Build the Wall event as vice president of Bienvenido, an organization dedicated to conservative Hispanic outreach.

== U.S. House of Representatives ==
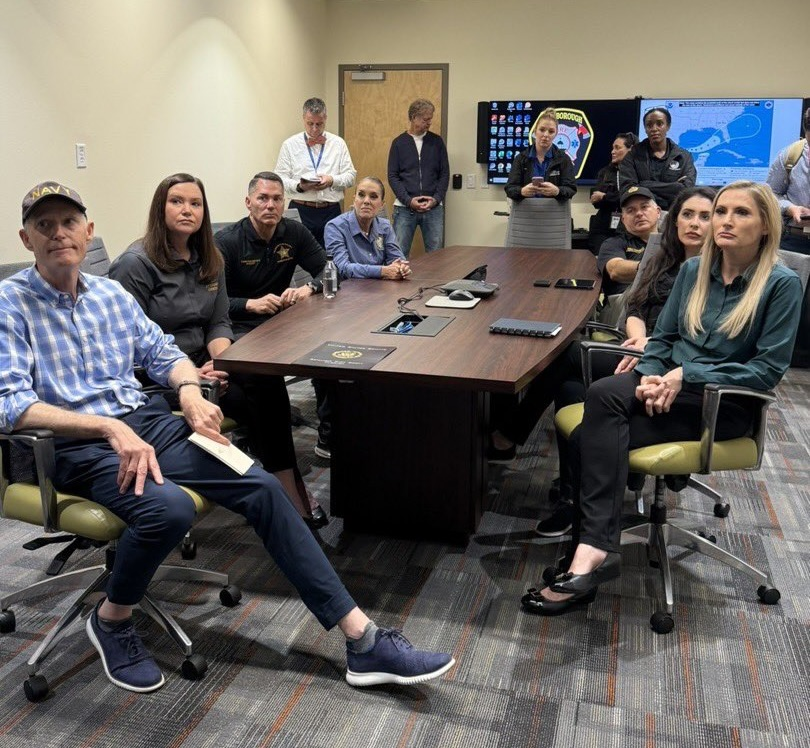
Luna with Senator Rick Scott, then-attorney general Ashley Moody, Hillsborough County sheriff Chad Chronister, then-chief financial officer Jimmy Patronis, and Congresswoman Laurel Lee in the Hillsborough County, Florida Emergency Operations Center, responding to Hurricane Milton

=== Elections ===
==== 2020 ====
Luna decided to run for Congress in 2018. She entered the Republican primary for Florida's 13th congressional district in September 2019, and Matt Gaetz endorsed her in November 2019. She was also endorsed by Charlie Kirk, Elise Stefanik, Students for Trump, and former mayor of St. Petersburg, Florida, Bill Foster. In July 2020, she and her husband purchased a house in St. Petersburg, near MacDill Air Force Base, where her husband was stationed. Luna won the Republican primary, but lost to incumbent Democrat Charlie Crist in the general election.

==== 2022 ====
Luna was elected as the U.S. representative for Florida's 13th congressional district in the 2022 election, defeating Democratic nominee Eric Lynn, a former senior advisor for Barack Obama. Before the Republican primary, another Republican candidate privately threatened to have her assassinated by a hit squad. In June 2021, Luna was granted a temporary stalking injunction against her primary opponent, William Braddock, after a friend of Luna's recorded Braddock threatening to make Luna "disappear" and claiming he had "access to a hit squad, too, Ukrainians and Russians". Braddock dropped out of the race after the judge granted the temporary injunction. The judge dismissed the request for a permanent injunction, saying she found one instance of harassment when the law required two.

Donald Trump endorsed Luna, and Marjorie Taylor Greene campaigned for her in Florida. She is the first Mexican-American woman elected to Congress from Florida.

==== 2024 ====
Luna was challenged in the general election by Whitney Fox, a moderate Democrat and former communications director for the Pinellas Suncoast Transit Authority. Though seen as the only Florida house seat being in striking distance for Democrats, Luna won re-election with 55% of the vote, compared to Fox's 45%.

=== Tenure ===
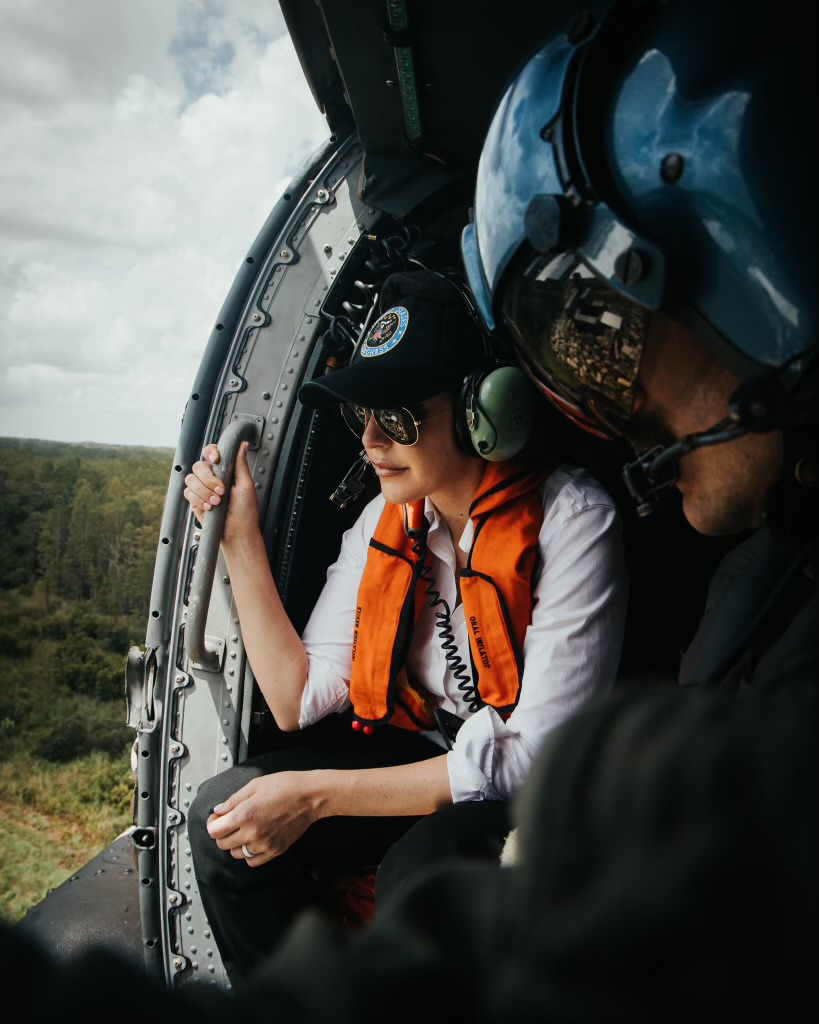
Luna surveying Pinellas County with the U.S. Coast Guard

On May 23, 2023, Luna co-sponsored resolutions to impeach Attorney General Merrick Garland, FBI director Christopher Wray, Secretary of Homeland Security Alejandro Mayorkas, and U.S. attorney for D.C. Matthew M. Graves.

On June 21, 2023, Luna sponsored a resolution censuring Democratic representative Adam Schiff for his past actions as chair of the House Intelligence Committee in leading investigations into then-president Donald Trump. The House agreed to the resolution with a vote of 213–209.

On July 10, 2024, Luna brought forward a privileged resolution to have U.S. attorney general Merrick Garland found in inherent contempt of Congress. The resolution would have imposed a fine of $10,000 per day on Garland for defying a congressional subpoena. The measure failed to pass in a 204 to 210 vote.

In the 118th Congress she co-sponsored a pair of resolutions meant to expunge the impeachments of Donald Trump. In the 119th United States Congress, she again co-sponsored resolutions to expunge Trump's impeachments.

In January 2025, Luna introduced a bill proposing to add Trump's face to Mount Rushmore.

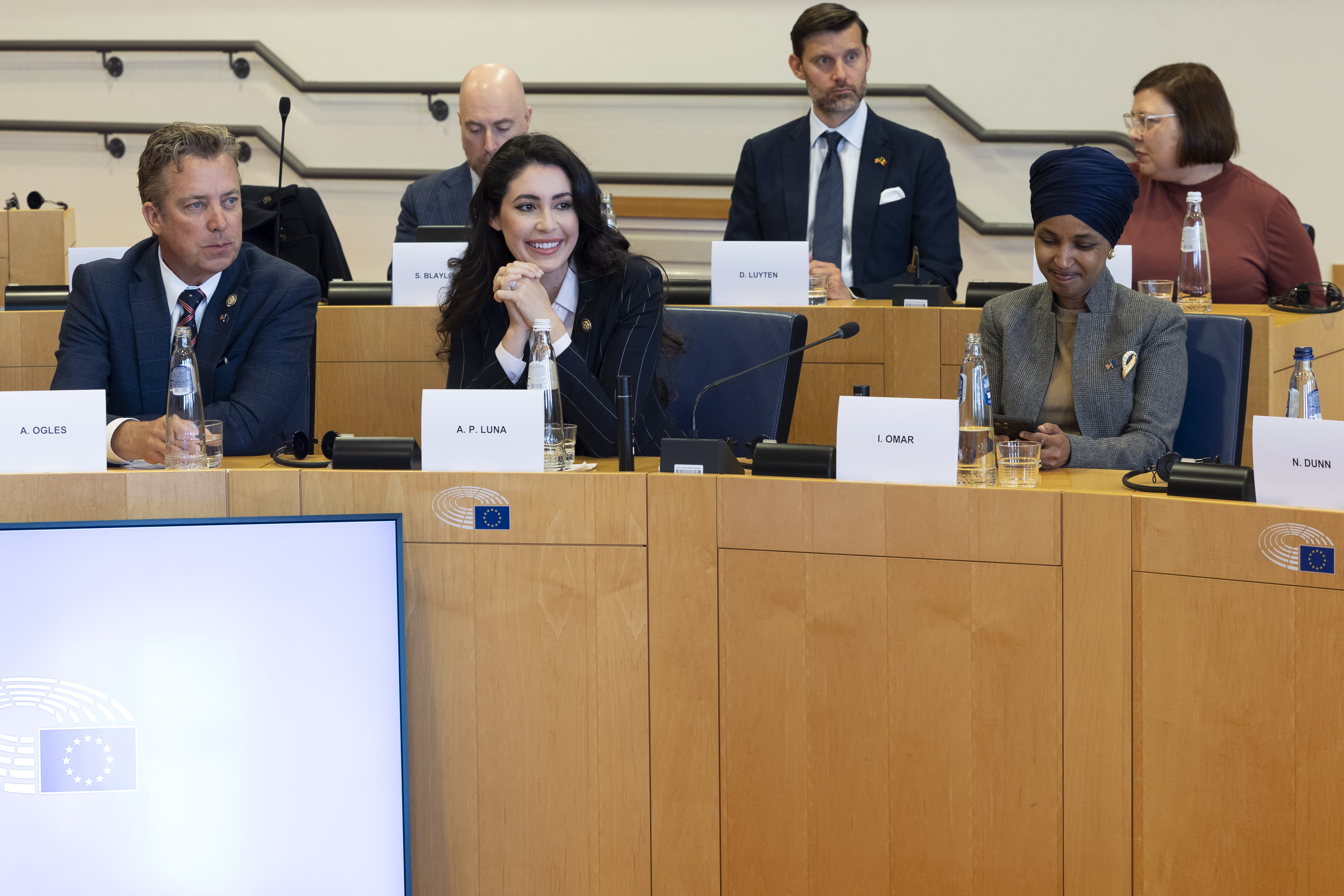
Luna next to Andy Ogles and Ilhan Omar during a meeting in the European Parliament, April 2025

In March 2025, Luna worked with Rep. Brittany Pettersen (D), some other Democrats and some Republicans to force a vote on a bill through a discharge petition which would allow new parents to vote by proxy. The petition angered members of the Freedom Caucus, who believe that proxy voting is unconstitutional, and led them to initially vote against a procedural rules vote on Republican supported energy bills. After negotiations with House Republican leadership, the Freedom Caucus would later allow the vote to pass. Freedom Caucus leadership urged Republican leadership to raise the threshold required to force a vote on a bill through a discharge petition. Luna would later resign from the Freedom Caucus. In a letter, she said her decision to resign was due to the loss of "mutual respect that has guided our caucus." On April 1, Republican leadership attempted to pass a rule vote that would prevent Luna's bill from being voted on. Nine Republicans (Luna, Tim Burchett, Mike Lawler, Kevin Kiley, Nick LaLota, Jeff Van Drew, Max Miller, Greg Steube and Ryan Mackenzie) joined all Democrats to block the rule vote. On April 6, Luna and Johnson reached an agreement that would allow absent members to use vote pairing. Their intended vote will still be published in the Congressional Record.

In September 2025, Luna criticized the Anti-Defamation League for listing the Christian Identity movement as extremist. The criticism came after Elon Musk negatively commented on a screenshot of the ADL's page on Christian Identity. Luna said the ADL was "intentionally creating a targeted hate campaign against Christians."

Following the 2025 Brown University shooting, Luna amplified a theory misidentifying a Palestinian student at Brown University as the perpetrator. A different individual, Claudio Manuel Neves Valente, was subsequently identified as the shooter.

In March 2026, Luna hosted a delegation of visiting Russian lawmakers on a tour of the United States Capitol. Luna's hosting was criticized by fellow congressional lawmakers, including her Republican colleagues.

In June 2026, Luna submitted an amendment to the National Defense Authorization Act. Luna's summary of the amendment was copied and pasted from Claude AI, with the summary including the phrase "Claude responded." Luna defended her use of AI, saying most congressional staff members used AI.

Luna held a hearing in June 2026 on MKULTRA, the defunct CIA failed mind control program. Luna had previously shared an article from the Daily Mail titled "Declassified CIA files reveal chilling blueprint to manipulate Americans' minds through covert drugging with vaccines". During the hearing, Luna said the CIA was declassifying newly discovered files on MKULTRA and suggested, without evidence, that USAID may have been involved in MKULTRA operations overseas.

In July 2026, the Wall Street Journal said a source had told it that, during the 2024 United States presidential election, Luna said she had tipped off conservative influencer Rogan O'Handley that Trump had selected JD Vance as his running mate so that O'Handley could place a winning wager on Polymarket. Luna reportedly teased O'Handley for not placing a bigger wager. Luna said she did not know beforehand that Vance had been selected as Vice President and O'Handley said he had not received, traded on or discussed nonpublic information about Trump's vice presidential pick. A source told the WSJ that the United States Commodity Futures Trading Commission (CFTC) opened an investigation into the allegation after receiving a report. Luna lodged a criminal complaint with the CFTC, stating that the report made to the agency was knowingly false.

=== Committee assignments ===
For the 119th Congress:

- Committee on Foreign Affairs
  - Subcommittee on Oversight and Accountability
  - Subcommittee on Europe
- Committee on Oversight and Government Reform
  - Subcommittee on Cybersecurity, Information Technology, and Government Innovation
  - Delivering on Government Efficiency
  - Subcommittee on Military and Foreign Affairs
  - Subcommittee on Health Care and Financial Services

=== Caucus memberships ===
- Freedom Caucus (2023–2025)
- Unidentified Anomalous Phenomena Caucus
- El Salvador Caucus, Chair (2024–)

== Political positions ==
=== 2020 presidential election ===
In June 2022, Luna repeated false claims that the 2020 United States presidential election was stolen, "I believe that President Trump won that election, and I do believe that voter fraud occurred." The previous month, she attended a red carpet event and screening of 2000 Mules, a film that claims to show evidence of widespread electoral fraud in the 2020 election. She authored the 2023 Christian children's book, The Legend of Naranja, which suggests that Biden stole the 2020 election.

=== Political assassinations ===
In February 2025, Luna was appointed by Speaker Mike Johnson to lead a House Oversight Task Force on declassification of federal secrets, instigated by president Trump's executive order on "Declassification of Records Concerning the Assassinations of President John F. Kennedy, Senator Robert F. Kennedy, and the Reverend Dr. Martin Luther King, Jr." During September 2025 the scope of the task force included a hearing on "UAP transparency and whistleblower protection". During her inquiry into the assassination of John F. Kennedy, Luna said she had been handed a report by Alexander Darchiev, Russian Ambassador to the United States, which contained the Russian government's "findings on who assassinated JFK". Luna further said the release of the documents was "of massive historical significance." Conservative columnist Marc Thiessen mocked Luna, sarcastically replying "Zero chance the Russians are laughing at you." She stated during a congressional hearing for the further release of documents related to the JFK assassination that efforts were underway to release a film taken by Dave Wiegman Jr., of NBC that caught an unidentified person during the assassination dubbed "prayer man", theorized by some to have been Lee Harvey Oswald. She later initiated a lawsuit against the US government for the release of the films taken by Wiegman and James Darnell of WBAP-TV, which also caught the "prayer man". A petition was launched on Openpetition and received support from many.

Following the assassination of Charlie Kirk in 2025, Luna spoke at Kirk's memorial. Luna said that Kirk had recruited her to work at Turning Point USA, and credited him with launching her political career. Luna wrote a letter calling for a statue of Charlie Kirk to be installed in the United States Capitol. She further shared a meme comparing Kirk to Martin Luther King Jr., Jesus Christ, Abraham Lincoln, and John F. Kennedy, saying these individuals were killed "All because of words". When Kirk was alive, he had condemned King as "awful". King's daughter Bernice King criticized the post, writing, "There are so many things wrong with this. So many. I get tired, y'all."

=== Abortion ===
Luna has expressed strong support for abortion bans, labeling herself a "pro-life extremist". She has said her anti-abortion stance originates from having dissected a chicken egg in college and seeing the chick react to a scalpel blade: "God was using that opportunity to really wake me up."

=== Agriculture ===
In March 2024, Luna led a letter signed by 10 House Republicans to the House Agriculture Committee opposing the inclusion of the Ending Agriculture Trade Suppression (EATS) Act in the 2024 farm bill. The EATS Act aimed to prevent state and local governments from enforcing regulations on the production of agricultural goods sold across state lines. The letter expressed concern that the legislation would negatively impact American farmers and cede influence over the U.S. agricultural system to entities owned by foreign adversaries, particularly China. It was noted by agricultural industry observers and advocacy organizations for signaling conservative Republican opposition to federal preemption of state-level animal welfare laws such as California's Proposition 12.

=== Congressional stock trading ===
Luna was one of the original 16 cosponsors of the Restore Trust in Congress Act (H.R.5106), introduced on September 3, 2025, by Republican Chip Roy of Texas. The act, a bipartisan effort to ban members of Congress and their spouses and dependents from owning and trading stocks, had 119 cosponsors as of December 2025.

=== Economic issues ===
In an August 2022 interview, Luna said that she would support a ban on U.S. oil exports to increase the domestic oil supply, saying, "The United States has literally one of the biggest supplies of cleanest oil in the entire world. There's no reason why we need to be going to places like Saudi Arabia or even Venezuela to get those oil sources." She said this view belonged to an "America First" platform, adding, "If it means not selling to other countries so that here in the United States, we can literally lower the gas prices, that's what I agree with."

Luna was among the 71 Republicans who voted against final passage of the Fiscal Responsibility Act of 2023 in the House.

In March 2025, Luna and Democrat Alexandria Ocasio-Cortez co-sponsored legislation seeking to cap credit card interest rates at 10%.

=== Education ===
Luna's website states that she opposes "radical left-wing gender theory being pushed on our kids".

=== Gun control ===
Luna appeared on the February/March 2020 cover of Ballistic magazine, which called her "DC's Next 2A Warrior". In February 2023, she was one of several members of Congress seen wearing AR-15 rifle lapel pins.

=== Social media ===
In September 2020, Luna threatened to sue Twitter because the company refused to verify her account, alleging "political prejudice" and calling it "election meddling", and in October 2020, Luna's campaign said it filed a complaint with the FEC over Twitter's refusal to verify Luna's account. The FEC complaint said that Twitter violated the equal time rule by verifying Charlie Crist, but not Luna, and asked the FEC to force Twitter to verify Luna's account.

During a combative House Oversight Committee hearing on February 8, 2023, Luna alleged that Twitter, the federal government, "leftist non-profits", and, potentially, the Democratic National Committee had acted jointly to censor Americans in November 2020 through the Jira project management platform, and that it violated the First Amendment.

When, early January 2026, Prime Minister Keir Starmer warned that X could be blocked in the United Kingdom because of its ability to generate AI sexualized images of women and children, Luna called for sanctions against the country if it went through with a ban.

=== Foreign policy ===
==== NATO ====
In March 2025 Luna expressed opposition to U.S. membership in NATO.

==== Ukraine ====
Luna is a cosponsor of the 2023 Ukraine Fatigue Resolution (H.Res.113), sponsored by former Florida representative Matt Gaetz. The bill would suspend all U.S. foreign aid to Ukraine for the war there and demand that all combatants in this conflict reach a peace agreement immediately.

Also in 2023, Luna was among 98 Republicans to vote for a ban on cluster munitions to Ukraine. The same year, Luna voted for a moratorium on aid to Ukraine. In April 2024, Luna again voted against the $60 billion military aid package for Ukraine.

In October 2025, amidst the Russo-Ukrainian war, Luna met with Kirill Dmitriev, an envoy of Russian president Vladimir Putin. Regarding the meeting, Luna said that she wished to "foster the relationship and conversations of peace and trade. Our two countries do not need to be enemies. Allies in trade benefit everyone." After Putin said that Donald Trump deserved the Nobel Peace Prize, Luna praised Putin, thanking the Russian government for "backing" the President.

On January 9, 2026, Luna claimed that Christians were being persecuted in Ukraine. She announced she would contact the State Department. Luna also proclaimed that the "Vatican has a responsibility to ensure that they are educating the international community on what is happening across the world, specifically with regard to Christian persecution." Luna based her opinion on a letter from Ukrainian MPs Oleksandr Dubinsky, Artem Dmytruk and Oleksandr Kunytskyi, in which they claimed that in Ukraine the "number of political prisoners has already exceeded 42,000, along with the criminal prosecution of 400,000 Ukrainian men who refused to go to frontline and fight." According to Olha Stefanishyna, the ambassador of Ukraine to the United States, there were no political prisoners in the entire Ukrainian penitentiary system, out of a total 34,600 inmates.

==== Middle East ====
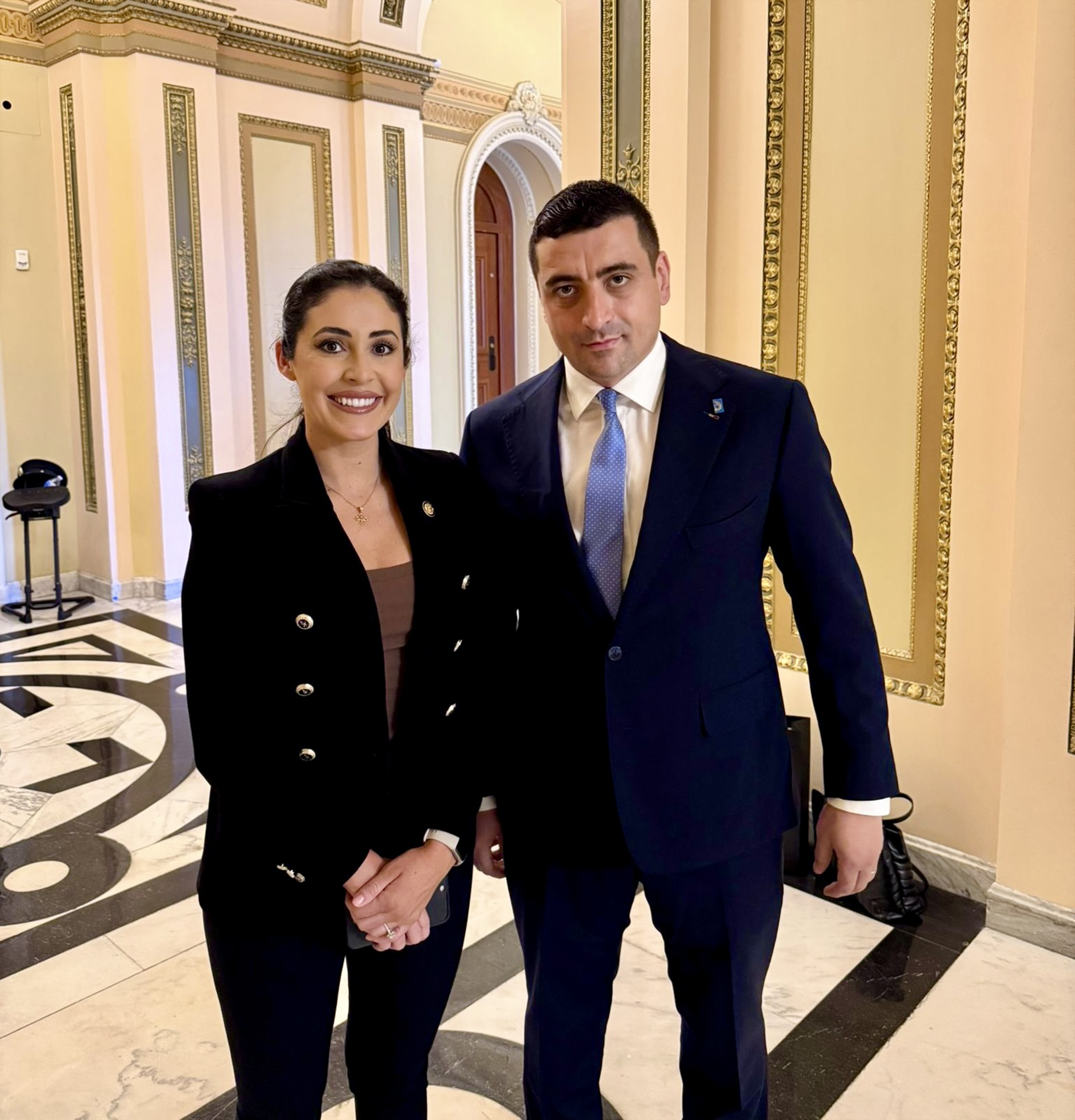
Luna with Romanian presidential candidate George Simion in June 2025

In 2023, Luna was among 47 Republicans to vote in favor of H.Con.Res. 21, which directed President Joe Biden to remove U.S. troops from Syria within 180 days. That same year Luna was among 52 Republicans who voted in favor H.Con.Res. 30, which would remove American troops from Somalia.

==== Germany ====
In August 2026 Luna wrote a letter to the Committee for Justice of the Thüringer Landtag, the parliament of the German state Thuringia, in reaction to the motion by The Left parliamentary group on initiating proceedings to ban the Alternative for Germany (AfD), the biggest opposition party in the federal parliament and in multiple state parliaments as well as leading party in opinion polling for the next German federal election. Luna referred to the Western tradition of the free constitutional state, stating that "criticism of the government does not equate hostility toward the Constitution, nor a successful opposition with a threat to democracy". In the letter she expressed her impression, that there was a lack of "convincing evidence" that the AfD aims to "abolish the free democratic basic order" as well as a lack of any realistic possibility that such a plan could be implemented" and that she rather has the impression that the domestic intelligence agencies on state and federal level are being instrumentalized against the AfD. She announced that, in the event of an AfD ban, she would speak to the US Secretary of State and request a travel ban for all the MPs who introduced the motion, as well as for those who support it. "Something like this must never happen in a democracy, and it should not happen in this case either."

== Personal life ==
Luna identifies as a Messianic Jewish Christian. She is married to Andrew Gamberzky, a U.S. Air Force combat controller whom she met while serving in the United States Air Force. In 2019, she took her maternal grandmother's maiden name, Luna, to represent her Hispanic heritage. Her mother had also changed her own surname to Luna following a finalized divorce. Gamberzky later served with the Oregon Air National Guard but resigned after his application to be exempt from the COVID-19 vaccine mandate for religious reasons was rejected. Luna and Gamberzky subsequently sued the Department of Defense, alleging that Gamberzky's First Amendment rights had been violated. As of 2025, Gamberzky works at military technology and artificial intelligence company OKSI.

In 2023 family members told The Washington Post that Luna's paternal grandfather, Heinrich Mayerhofer, served as a soldier in Nazi Germany's military during the 1940s, and they disputed her claim of Jewish heritage, stating that her father was Catholic and that none of them remember him practicing Judaism. The Post reviewed a photo of Mayerhofer in a Nazi uniform, which the Simon Wiesenthal Center confirmed matched that of the Wehrmacht. Luna's office declined to comment on the matter.

Luna announced that she had given birth to a son on August 27, 2023.

In mid-August 2025, Luna said on The Joe Rogan Experience that she had heard testimony about non-human beings on Earth. She said that "Congress has seen proof of 'interdimensional beings'", and that "I think that they can actually operate through the time spaces that we currently have".

== Books ==
- Luna, Anna Paulina; Andrew, Gamberzky (2023). The Legend of Naranja. Illustrated by Edmond, Lars. Brave Books. ISBN 978-1955550512.
- Luna, Anna Paulina (2018). Marrying the Beret: The Untold Stories of US Special Operations. Post Hill Press. ISBN 978-0578432755.
- Luna, Anna Paulina (2021). Bringing Them Home: The Untold Cost of Putting Missions First. Post Hill Press. ISBN 978-1637580189.

== Electoral history ==
Electoral history of Anna Paulina Luna
| Year | Office | Party | Primary | | | General | | | Result | Swing | Ref. |
| Year | Office | Party | Total | % | P. | Total | % | P. | Result | Swing | Ref. |
|---|---|---|---|---|---|---|---|---|---|---|---|
| 2020 | U.S. House | Republican | 22,941 | 36.14% | 1st | 190,713 | 46.95% | 2nd | Lost | Hold | |
| 2022 | U.S. House | Republican | 37,156 | 44.48% | 1st | 181,487 | 53.14% | 1st | Won | Gain | |
| 2024 | U.S. House | Republican | | | | 225,636 | 54.82% | 1st | Won | Hold | |
Source: Secretary of State of Florida | Election Results

== See also ==
- List of Hispanic and Latino Americans in the United States Congress

U.S. House of Representatives
| Preceded by Charlie Crist | Member of the U.S. House of Representatives from Florida's 13th congressional district 2023–present | Incumbent |
U.S. order of precedence (ceremonial)
| Preceded by Summer Lee | United States representatives by seniority 330th | Succeeded by Morgan Luttrell |
