= Willie Simmons =

Willie Simmons is the name of:

- Willie Lee Simmons (born 1947), American politician, former Mississippi state senator
- Willie Simmons (American football) (born 1980), American college football head coach and former player
- Willie Simmons (inmate) (born 1957), American sentenced to life without possibility of parole for stealing $9
- Willie Simmons (association football), member of the Bermuda national football team since 2016
- Willie Simmons (basketball), American who played in the Australian National Basketball League (1986–2003) - see 1988 NBL Finals

== See also ==
- Robert Simmons House, also known as the Willie Simmons House, Saint Helena Island, South Carolina, United States, on the National Register of Historic Places
- William Simmons (disambiguation)
