= William Simons (disambiguation) =

William Simons was a British actor:

William Simons may also refer to:

- William Simons (politician), Reconstruction era politician in South Carolina
- William Simons (priest), English Anglican priest
- William Simons & Co., a Scottish shipbuilding firm

== See also ==
- Billy Simons, American singer-songwriter
- William Simon (disambiguation)
- William Simmons (disambiguation)
