= Change.org =

American petition website

Change.org, PBC
- Website type: Private (nonprofit-owned, Delaware public benefit corporation)
- Founded: Incorporated in Delaware on February 7, 2007; 19 years ago
- Headquarters: Remote
- Area served: Worldwide
- Owner: Change.org Foundation
- Founder: Ben Rattray
- CEO: Ben Rattray
- Key people: Benjamin Joffe-Walt (Chief Operations Officer); Brad Henrickson (Chief Technology Officer)
- Industry: Internet
- Revenue: ▲US$115 million (2021)
- Net income: ▲US$108 million (2021)
- Total assets: ▲US$114 million (2021)
- Employees: 217
- Website: www.change.org

Change.org is a website which allows users to create and sign petitions in an attempt to advance various social causes by raising awareness and influencing decision-makers. The site is a US-based for-profit company and claims to have 583 million users as of May 2026. Petitions often focus on causes such as general justice, economic justice, criminal justice, human rights, education, environmental protection, animal rights, cyber bullying, health, religious freedom, and sustainable food.

The site also provides support and coaching for organizations and paid members to help further advance their causes. Along with being a petitions platform, the website also has two other pillars: Change.vote (for elections information) and Ideas for Change (local deliberations).

== History ==
Change.org was launched in 2007 by current chief executive Ben Rattray, with the support of founding chief technology officer Mark Dimas, Darren Haas, and Adam Cheyer.

In 2011, Change.org claimed it was the subject of a distributed denial of service attack by "Chinese hackers." The alleged attack was related to its petition to the Chinese government to release artist Ai Weiwei.

In 2011, there was a proposal to merge the Spanish-speaking counterpart website Actuable into Change.org; the merger occurred in 2012 when the voluntary union of Actuable users into the Change.org platform was approved.

By February 2012, the site had 100 employees with offices on four continents.

In 2012, Arizona State University decided to block access to Change.org in response to a petition created by student Eric Haywood protesting against "rising tuition costs at the school." University officials claimed that "Change.org is a spam site" and that the blocking was conducted "to protect the use of our limited and valuable network resources for legitimate academic, research, and administrative uses." The block was lifted the following day.

It was reported on April 5, 2012, that Change.org hit 10 million members and was the fastest-growing social action platform on the web. At that time, they were receiving 500 new petitions per day. On May 13, 2012, The Guardian, BBC News, and other sources reported that Change.org would launch a UK-specific platform for petitions, placing Change.org in competition with 38 Degrees, a British not-for-profit political-activism organization.

In May 2013, the company announced a $15 million round of investment led by Omidyar Network and said it had 170 staff members in 18 countries.

An August 2013 Fast Company article reported that Change.org would roll out features for petition recipients allowing them to respond to the petition publicly and create a decision-maker page where they could see all petitions against them in one place.

On June 30, 2021, workers for Change.org announced that a majority of staff in the US and Canada had signed union authorization cards in favor of being represented for collective bargaining by CODE-CWA and that Change.org had voluntarily recognized CODE-CWA as the representative of the workers.

== Notable petitions ==
=== Australia ===
In 2018, an anonymous creator of a Facebook community against bike riders started a Change.org anti-cycling petition that shortly reached over 100,000 signatures. Allegedly, some of the names on the petition are fake.

In 2019, a petition was created to remove Senator Fraser Anning from the Australian Federal Parliament after his comments on the terrorist attack in Christchurch, New Zealand. Anning blamed immigration laws, the victims and heightened fears of Muslims for the attack. As of March 24, 2019, the petition has 1,418,105 signatures, making it one of the most signed petitions on Change.org and the highest concerning Australian affairs.

On July 3, 2015, a 14-year-old girl began a petition to ensure that domestic violence prevention is covered in the Australian curriculum. The campaign was started to raise awareness for people who were unaware they were domestic violence victims. After the campaign, Minister Pru Goward announced that the school districts would introduce domestic violence education into schools. The campaign had 101,747 supporters.

In August 2024, an anonymous petition was posted calling for an investigation into the conduct of Rachael Gunn, Anna Meares, and the selection process, garnered thousands of signatures. This petition aimed to hold Gunn accountable for "unethical conduct" at the games, also accusing Raygun of "manipulating the selection process" while calling for a public apology from both Gunn and Meares. The Australian Olympic Committee (AOC) chief executive Matt Carroll demanded the petition be withdrawn, saying it amounted to "bullying and harassment and is defamatory" and that the AOC was especially offended by the insult to Meares. It stated that the Australian selection was made by 9 independent international judges, and that Gunn was nominated legitimately by DanceSport Australia to the AOC for selection. Gunn is not any kind of officeholder with AUSBreaking nor DanceSport, and no athlete appealed against her selection. The petition was withdrawn by Change.org on 15 August 2024.

In August 2024, a petition targeting Rachael Gunn and Olympic Chef de Mission Anna Meares was launched, accusing Gunn of unethical conduct in her Olympic selection. The petition quickly amassed over 45,000 signatures but was removed by Change.org after being condemned by the Australian Olympic Committee (AOC) as "defamatory and misleading". The AOC described the petition as "disgraceful" and harmful, emphasizing that Gunn's selection process was transparent and followed the World DanceSport Federation's approved qualification system. However, Change.org upheld its community guidelines by removing the petition for violating its policies against harassment and spreading false information.

=== Brazil ===
On March 15, 2021, Supreme Federal Court Minister Alexandre de Moraes's impeachment request received more than 4,770,000 signatures.

On October 13, 2017, Ana Clara Leite was sexually harassed twice in taxis after drivers accessed her information using a mobile app called Easy Taxi. She won her petition asking Easy Taxi App to introduce safety measures, with the backing of more than 27,000 Brazilians.

=== United States ===
In December 2011, a fourth-grade class in Brookline, Massachusetts, launched the "Lorax Petition Project" through Change.org requesting Universal Studios to include a more vital environmental message on its website and trailer for its upcoming film, The Lorax, based on the classic Dr. Seuss children's story. The petitioners felt that the website and trailer lacked an important message from the book, "to help the environment." The petition collected over 57,000 signatures, and on January 26, 2012, the studio updated the website "with the environmental message the kids had dictated."

On the morning of February 2, 2012, Stef Gray, a 23-year-old graduate in New York, held a news conference at the Washington offices of Sallie Mae, the "nation's largest private student-loan provider", presenting the results of her Change.org petition, which had received about 77,000 signatures. That afternoon, the company changed its forbearance fee policy.

In November 2013, Aaron Thompson of Tuscaloosa, Alabama, started a petition directed at Seth MacFarlane to bring back Brian Griffin of the TV series Family Guy after he was briefly killed off in the Season 12 episode "Life of Brian". Thompson's petition gained 30,000 signatures within 36 hours. The character was brought back to the show a few episodes later. However, this was not a result of the petition, as the episodes were conceived months prior.

In September 2014, Karol Wilcox of Hayti, Missouri, started a petition against the planned execution of Beau, a two-and-a-half-year-old dog in Dyersburg, Tennessee, for allegedly killing a duck on his owner's property. By November, the petition had gained over 540,000 signatures. The petition succeeded, and the dog was spared.

On December 5, 2015, the U.S. Congress reauthorized the Zadroga Act, which provides funds to first responders "suffering debilitating illnesses and injuries due to their service." When Congress stalled on reauthorizing the bill, John Feal, an advocate for first responders to the September 11 attacks, started a petition in its favor that nearly 187,000 people signed.

The New York Daily News reported:

Lifetime health benefits for sickened 9/11 first responders won overwhelming approval Friday from Congress after a long and contentious battle. The House and the Senate both voted to extend the Zadroga 9/11 Health and Compensation Act, giving coverage to those afflicted with Ground Zero-related health woes for the next 75 years. [...] In addition to extending the healthcare program for first responders and others suffering lingering 9/11 health issues, Congress renewed the Victims Compensation Fund for another five years to aid first responders too sick to work and their families.

After the 2016 United States presidential election, in which Donald Trump was declared President-elect of the United States, there were mass protests. As part of these protests, one California man started a petition on November 10, 2016, calling for electors in states that Trump won to become faithless electors and cast their vote for Hillary Clinton at state Electoral College meetings. The petition acquired over 4 million signatures by November 14, 2016, only four days after it started. By November 23, 2016, it had gotten 4.5 million signatures. The petition ultimately failed when, on December 19, 2016, Trump officially gained the presidency with 304 electors. The petition closed with 4.9 million signatures, the highest in the platform's history, until March 5, 2019, when it was surpassed by a petition opposing Article 13 of the proposed Directive on Copyright in the Digital Single Market, which held the #1 spot until 2020.

On November 3, 2017, Netflix fired Kevin Spacey, following sexual assault claims against the actor. It stalled the production of the sixth and final season of the television series in which Spacey starred on the network House of Cards. Following Spacey's dismissal, a petition created on November 2, 2017, calling for Spacey to be replaced by actor Kevin James began gaining many supporters. After its inception, the petition gained media notability, obtaining 50,000 supporters within eight days.

In the wake of the Logan Paul suicide video controversy, user "... - .- -.-- .- .-.. .. ...- ." ("stay alive" in Morse code) created a petition entitled "Delete Logan Paul's YouTube Channel", receiving more than 720,000 signatures. While numerous other petitions have been made for the same purpose, they have yet to obtain as much attention. No action was taken.

On July 14, 2019, an online petition titled "The Immediate Halt to the Construction of the TMT Telescope" was posted on Change.org in protest against the Thirty Meter Telescope. The petition gathered over 278,000 signatures.

On May 30, 2020, a petition titled "Justice for George Floyd" was created after unarmed African-American George Floyd was murdered by police, leading to mass protests. The petition earned over 19 million signatures, making it the most signed petition in the platform's history, surpassing the Article 13 opposition petition over a year earlier.

During the Depp v. Heard defamation trial, a petition was created to remove actress Amber Heard from her role as Mera in Aquaman and the Lost Kingdom. It gained 1.5 million signatures within a month of its creation in November 2020 and has since surpassed 4.6 million signatures after the trial was live-streamed publicly in May 2022.

On January 11, 2026, a petition signed by Ashley Hopwood of Bakersfield, California urging people to add cameras to special education classrooms, which gathered 28,000 signatures.

On August 14, 2026, a petition was signed to call on ABC for the release of Taylor Frankie Paul's season of The Bachelorette, with more than 25,000 signatures.

On September 27, 2026, a petition was signed titled "Cornell alumni supporting Jane Doe" was to call on Cornell University to demand justice on an unidentified person called Jane Doe, which reached more than 66,000 signatures.

=== United Kingdom ===
On March 10, 2015, political blogger Guido Fawkes, whose real name is Paul Staines, started a petition to reinstate Jeremy Clarkson, BBC co-host of the TV series Top Gear, following the BBC's decision to suspend him over a "fracas" involving a producer on the show. The petition gained over 500,000 signatures within 24 hours, making it the fastest-growing petition for the site and overburdening servers at Change.org in the UK, which became unresponsive due to the high demand. It had gained 1,060,980 signatures by March 20, 2015, and was delivered to the BBC. On March 25, 2015, the BBC released an official statement confirming that, due to the actions which led to his suspension, they would not be renewing his contract with the show.

In June 2014, Ghoncheh Ghavami, a law student at the University of London and a British-Iranian dual citizen, was arrested for attempting to attend a volleyball match as a protest, while in Iran teaching literacy to street children for charity as well as to visit family. Iman Ghavami, the prisoner's brother, created a Change.org campaign in a petition to the Government of Iran and the Government of the United Kingdom. The petition was signed by over 750,000 after public outrage in the United Kingdom began in support of freeing Ghavami.

In 2017 British social activist, model and influencer Georgie Aldous began campaigning for more men to be featured in British make-up campaigns after American makeup company CoverGirl announced it would be having its first CoverBoy, James Charles. He then began a petition on Change.org titled #GetMenOnMakeupCampaigns, calling on major beauty brands like Superdrug and Boots to start including men in their make-up campaigns. Aldous stated that he did contact brands, brand owners, PR teams and marketing teams about the lack of male representation but after receiving a lame excuse, a thanks for the feedback or a suspected bribery of free products, he created the campaign. This all changed when he made history and became the first male beauty model for Superdrug in 2017.

A petition was started in 2020 to get fundraiser Tom Moore knighted. As of April 30, 1 million people had signed it. It gained 1,043,729 signatures, and he was knighted on 20 May that year.

A petition was started in 2020, to get Dominic Cummings sacked after it emerged, he travelled from London to his parents' home in Durham with coronavirus symptoms during the COVID-19 lockdown. As of 13 Jan 2022, the petition had 1,201,401 signatures.

On January 13, 2022, a petition to rescind Tony Blair's knighthood received 1,106,497 signatures.

On August 3, 2026, a petition to stop the early release from jail of PC Andrew Harper's killer. As of August 14, 2026, it had 1,028,886 signatures.

=== Canada ===
In August 2014, Erica Perry of Vancouver, British Columbia, started a petition asking Centerplate, an extensive food and beverage corporation serving entertainment venues in North America and the UK, to fire its then-CEO Desmond "Des" Hague after the public release of security camera footage allegedly showing Hague abusing a young Doberman Pinscher in an elevator. In response to Centerplate not taking action after the incident (other than releasing a statement of apology from Hague) and an agreement by Hague to commit to performing certain charitable acts, the petition called for Centerplate to fire Hague. On September 2, 2014, after the petition had received over 190,000 signatures, Hague resigned as CEO of Centerplate.

On February 7, 2015, two 13-year-old girls petitioned to make consent a part of Canada's sex-ed program by stating, "In Canada, 1 in 4 women will experience at least one incident of sexual assault in their life. Half of these assaults will be against women under 16." By the end of the campaign, the petition had 40,484 supporters and met with Ontario Premier Kathleen Wynne and Minister Liz Sandals, which led to consent's integration into Canada's sex-ed program.

On November 11, 2026, a recent petition from Canadian Change.org user Dylan Brough of West Vancouver, that James Gunn and Peter Safran brought back to DC Studios received 169,000 signatures.

=== France ===
As of February 2016, 50 petitions have exceeded 100,000 signers. A petition against the "Loi El Khomri", a labour law project by the French Labor Minister Myriam El Khomri, has over 1 million signatures.

On October 24, 2015, Marion, a victim of harassment at her school that led to her ending her life, was the inspiration for a campaign started to "train in the prevention and management of school violence and bullying with teaching and educational teams will be reformed and improved." The campaign raised public interest, and the campaign leader, Marion's mother, met with the Ministry of National Education and had an interview with Minister Najat Vallaud Belkacem of National Education. The campaign had 79,432 supporters.

=== Philippines ===
The petition to have death row convict Mary Jane Veloso released was the fastest-ever growing petition from the Philippines, with over 250,000 signatories from over 125 countries.

=== Mexico ===
As of 2026, the “Salvemos Mahahual” petition opposing Royal Caribbean’s “Perfect Day Mexico” project in Mahahual, Quintana Roo, has gathered more than 4.5 million verified signatures on Change.org, becoming one of the largest recent environmental petitions in Mexico and calling for the protection of coastal ecosystems, mangroves, coral reefs, and local community rights.

After two earthquakes hit Central Mexico on September 7 and September 19, 2017, there were different petitions to force the "Instituto Nacional Electoral" (National Electoral Institute), the Mexican Senate, and President Enrique Peña Nieto to donate most or all of the money destined for the upcoming 2018 general elections be redirected to victims of the natural disaster in Mexico City and neighbor states of Morelos, Chiapas, Oaxaca, and Puebla. The petitions collected more than 3 million signatures.

=== India ===
After a series of assaults on doctors at various places in India, Dr Sumit Periwal of Gangtok started a petition to highlight the plight of doctors, lack of security and lack of fear of legal reprisals among perpetrators. To date the petition has over 2 million signatures.

=== Most-signed petitions ===
The following is a list of petitions that have reached or surpassed 1.5 million signatures. These can be checked on the change.org website; a link cannot be included as it is blacklisted by Wikipedia as a reference for general purposes.

Petitions	Total signatures (millions)	Petition status (success; failure; ongoing)	Petition started by	Ref.
Justice for George Floyd	19.6	S	Kellen S, OR, US	
Justice for Breonna Taylor	11.4	O		
Julius Jones is innocent. Free him now.	6.6	O		
Justice for Elijah McClain	5.6	O		
Offer commutation as time served, or grant clemency to Rogel Lazaro Aguilera-Mederos	5.1	S		
Stop the Willow project	5.0	O	Sienna Floor, United States	
Salvemos Mahahual — Detengamos el proyecto destructivo de Royal Caribbean	4.9	O	morgane VAINBERG, México	
Impeachment request of Alexandre de Moraes	4.7	O		
Remove Amber Heard from Aquaman 2	4.6	F		
Justice for Ahmaud Arbery	3.9	O		
Petition to make Kobe Bryant the new NBA logo	3.2	O		
Willie Simmons has served 38 years for a $9 robbery	3.2	O	Makheru Bradley	
Change KKK status into terrorist organization	3.1	O		
$2000/month to every American (COVID-19 stimulus money)	3.1	F		
A petition against the pension age hike in Russia	2.9	F		
People assaulting doctors should be punished like terrorists.	2.2	O	Dr Sumit Periwal, Gangtok, India	
Save Kerala from Mullaperiyar Dam disaster	1.9	O		

== Business model ==
The company was founded as a Public Benefit Corporation, which itself is owned by the non-profit Change.org Foundation, as of 2021. It raised US$72 million from backers, including LinkedIn founder Reid Hoffman, Ray Dalio, Richard Brandson, Sam Altman, Jerry Yang, and Joe Lonsdale. More than 50 investors, including Hoffman, donated their equity holdings to the Change.org Foundation in 2021.

After its inception, the website made revenue by running campaigns for advocacy organizations such as Amnesty International and list-building services to partner organizations. It has made revenue through advertising, subscriptions and membership models, and investment funding rounds.

Donations through the platform do not go to campaign makers. According to a Change.org spokesperson, "The money raised from petitions goes toward helping the campaign win and helping us build and maintain our technology platform, making it possible for us to provide people with the tools they need to win the change they want to see."

== Criticism ==
=== Allegation of fake signatures ===
In 2018, Anne Savage, the CEO of Bicycle Queensland, claimed that a prominent Australian anti-cycling petition on Change.org was full of false names. She said Bicycle Queensland had received information that electronic "bots" created many names. A spokesperson for Change.org denied that the signatures were fake, saying that the organization's engineering team had double-checked the petition and confirmed there was no unusual activity.

=== Visibility of personal information ===
Under certain conditions, signatures and other private information, including email addresses, can be found by search engines. Change.org operates a system for signature hiding, which works only if the user has an account on Change.org. Conversely, the platform has been criticized for not providing enough information on who has signed a petition, such as a means of verifying that a petition protesting a politician has been signed by their constituents or that the signatures are genuine at all.

=== Nonprofit status and .org versus .com ===
Change.org is a Delaware General Corporation Law-organized benefit corporation and certified B corporation. This has resulted in debate and criticism of its use of the .org domain suffix rather than the commercial .com. The site has been accused of fooling its users and hiding that it is "a for-profit entity with an economic incentive to get people to sign petitions."

Change.org is being deliberately deceitful through the use of the Change.org name. I'd suspect that the average Change.org user does not know that Change.org is a for-profit corporation, and that the corporation plans on using the contact information being provided to them to earn revenue.

— Clay Johnson

Change.org spokesperson Charlotte Hill countered this criticism in a September 2013 article in Wired, saying, "We are a mission-driven social enterprise, and while we bring in revenue, we reinvest 100% of that revenue back into our mission of empowering ordinary people. It's not just that we're not yet making a profit – we are decidedly not-for-profit." Its founder Ben Rattray gave a reason for Change.org's legal status:

Rattray originally planned to build a nonprofit, but that changed when he started talking to funders. "People kept telling me: 'We love your vision, but you don't necessarily need to be a nonprofit,'" he remembers. "They said that businesses have a couple advantages: speed and scale."

=== Advertising policy ===
In 2012, the site dropped most of its previously placed restrictions on paid content. Internal documents began referring to "clients" and "partners" as "advertisers" and stated that "only advertisers strictly identified as 'hate groups' are to be banned." As a result, Change.org was accused of encouraging astroturfing and abandoning the progressive user base from which it initially gained traction. Additional controversy arose when the employee who initially leaked the documents was fired. Many of the users who lost interest in the site after this change expressed difficulty being removed from the Change.org mailing lists.

=== Selling of personal data ===
Change.org has also been accused of selling the personal data provided by the users to third-party companies that hire its services.

On May 17, 2021, Change.org updated its privacy policy, which included a formal statement from the company regarding the selling of personal data: "Change.org does not sell the personal information of any of our users, and we have not sold data in the last 12 months."

However, Change.org does admit in its privacy policy that they pass users' data to a third party to "ensure the smooth running of the Change.org platform." Additionally, they have "contracts in place with our 3rd party service providers to ensure they keep your personal information safe. These contracts prohibit them from sharing the information about you that they collect or receive with anyone else or from using such information for purposes other than those we agreed with them."

=== Use for trending topics ===
Topics for Change.org petitions have grown to include disagreement with the Academy Awards and removing milk from certain types of coffee. The authors of these petitions have been criticized for focusing on "first-world problems." The further debate over the content of petitions came in November 2014 when Martin Daubney called some of them "bizarre" and stated that the site was being used to promote censorship. In response, the Change.org communication director John Coventry defended the wide range of petitions, saying that "people make an informed choice in what they want to support." The following week saw criticism alleging that petitions about the media receive more attention than petitions about "saving 'actual' lives."

=== Donations ===
Change.org solicits signatories to donate money after signing the petition. Although the donation is optional, it can be misleading to users who may believe it is used to fund petition organizers or advance that particular petition. The donations are "unrestricted", according to its FAQ. As further reported, "Change.org keeps the money and uses it to 'circulate' petitions more widely and pay for its operating costs."

Over 90 former employees of Change.org published an open letter noting that "these contributions serve to market the petition and Change.org itself" and, following the murder of George Floyd and consequent Black Lives Matter uprisings in June 2020, that "these actions constitute Change.org profiting from the death of Black people."

== Research ==
Change.org has attracted the interest of researchers working in the field of civic technology. In a quantitative analysis of the website's data, researchers found that while some users can be identified as natural "power" users, average users also learn from their experience; the Change.org recommendation system reinforces their willingness to continue using the website through tailored recommendations, turning them into "power" users. Research also suggests that petitions containing positive emotions have higher chances of success, while petitions appealing to moral and cognitive content are less likely to be successful. Another study examining a data set of 3.9 million signers of petitions across 132 countries showed that men and women have different policy priorities and that even though women create fewer petitions than men, their petitions are more likely to be more successful.

== See also ==
- Avaaz
- Care2
- GetUp!
- Indiegogo
- Kickstarter
- openPetition
- Rally.org
- Referendum
- Slacktivism
- SumOfUs
- TED (conference)
- UK Parliament petitions – UK Government petition website
- We the People – Whitehouse.gov petition website
