= Darren Haas =

American software engineer and executive (born 1974)

- Born: 1974 (age 51–52); Torrence, California
- Education: B.S. in Software Engineering
- Alma mater: California State University, Chico
- Known for: Change.org, Siri
- Scientific career
- Fields: Computer Technology
- Workplaces: General Electric

Darren Haas (born 1974) is an American software engineer and executive at General Electric, where he heads the Engineering group at GE Digital. He is a co-founder of Change.org and was a principal engineer at Siri, acquired by Apple.

== Education ==
Haas received as B.S. in Software Engineering from California State University, Chico.

== Career in software engineering ==
Before joining General Electric, Haas led a team that developed the cloud platform at Apple. Haas came to Apple by way of its acquisition of Siri, where he built early prototypes of the NLP engine and was co-founder of the Siri architectural platform. There he wrote the first prototype of Siri. During his tenure at Apple he co-founded Change.org.

== Popular Children's Application ==
In 2010, Haas wrote and released an IPhone application based on the popular book Flat Stanley. By 2019, the application had over 1 million downloads.

== Personal life ==
Haas is married and has four children.

== Awards and honors ==
- Outlier Award (2018)
