= William Simmons =

William Simmons may refer to:

- William Henry Simmons (1811–1882), English mezzotint engraver
- William Benjamin Dearborn Simmons (1823–1876), American organ builder
- William A. Simmons (1840–1916), American government official
- William J. Simmons (teacher) (1849–1890), American ex-slave and college president
- William Simmons (politician) (1865–1956), Canadian politician
- William Taylor Simmons (1872–?), American schoolteacher and Mississippi state legislator
- William Joseph Simmons (1880–1945), American founder of the second Ku Klux Klan
- Will Simmons (1884–1949), American painter
- William Simmons (athlete) (1903–?), English athlete
- William W. Simmons (executive) (1912–1997), American IBM executive
- William J. Simmons, see List of World War II aces from the United States
- William W. Simmons (physicist) (born 1932), American physicist
- William Simmons (anthropologist) (1938–2018), American anthropologist
- William Mark Simmons (born 1953), American fantasy and horror novelist
- William T. Simmons, United States Army officer and Medal of Honor recipient
- Bill "El Wingador" Simmons (born 1961), American competitive eater
- Bill Simmons (born 1969), American sports columnist

== See also ==
- William S. Simmons Plantation, a historic house in Cave Spring, Georgia, United States
- Billy Simmonds (born 1980), Australian entrepreneur, martial artist, and bodybuilder
- Willie Simmons (disambiguation)
- Billy Simmons (c. 1780–c. 1860), African-American Jew from Charleston, South Carolina
