= Ben Rattray =

Founder of Change.org

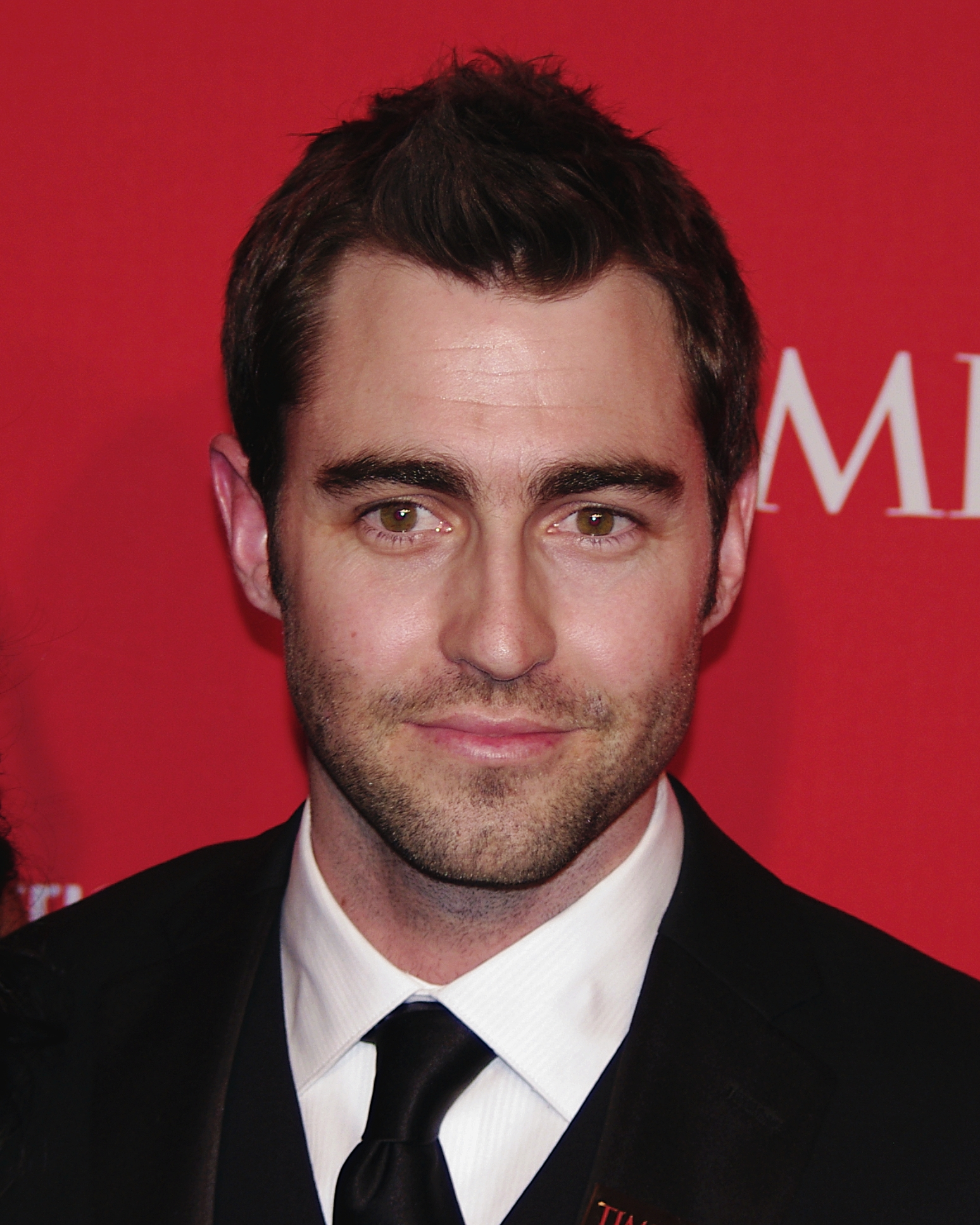
- Rattray in 2012
- Born: 1979 or 1980 (age 46–47); Santa Barbara, California, U.S.
- Education: Stanford University; London School of Economics
- Occupation: Entrepreneur
- Known for: Founder of Change.org
- Awards: 2012 Time 100 2012 Fortune 40 Under 40 2014 Commonwealth Club of California 21st Century Visionary Award

Ben Rattray (born 1979 or 1980 (age 46–47)) is an American entrepreneur and the founder of Change.org, an online petition platform launched in 2007. He has also served as the company's chief executive officer.

Rattray was named to the 2012 Time 100 list of influential people and Fortune's 2012 40 Under 40 list. In 2014, he received the Commonwealth Club of California's 21st Century Visionary Award.

== Early life and education ==
Rattray was born in Santa Barbara, California, and attended Dos Pueblos High School, where he participated in athletics and was named homecoming king.

He attended Stanford University, where he studied political science and economics. Rattray initially planned to pursue a career in investment banking, but later became interested in social and political organizing. He has said that a conversation with one of his brothers about the challenges faced by gay people influenced his decision to focus on collective action.

Rattray later attended the London School of Economics.

== Change.org ==
Rattray founded Change.org in 2007. The website initially operated as a social network focused on social activism. It was later reorganized as a platform for cause-related blogs before shifting its focus to online petitions in 2011.

Rattray has described the company's goal as changing "the balance of power between individuals and large organizations".

Change.org expanded rapidly during the early 2010s. In February 2012, Rattray said that more than 10,000 petitions were being created on the site each month and that the company's staff had grown from 20 to 100 employees during 2011.

In May 2013, Change.org announced a $15 million investment round led by Omidyar Network. At the time, the company reported more than 35 million users and 170 employees in 18 countries.
