= Billy Simmonds =

Australian entrepreneur, martial artist and bodybuilder

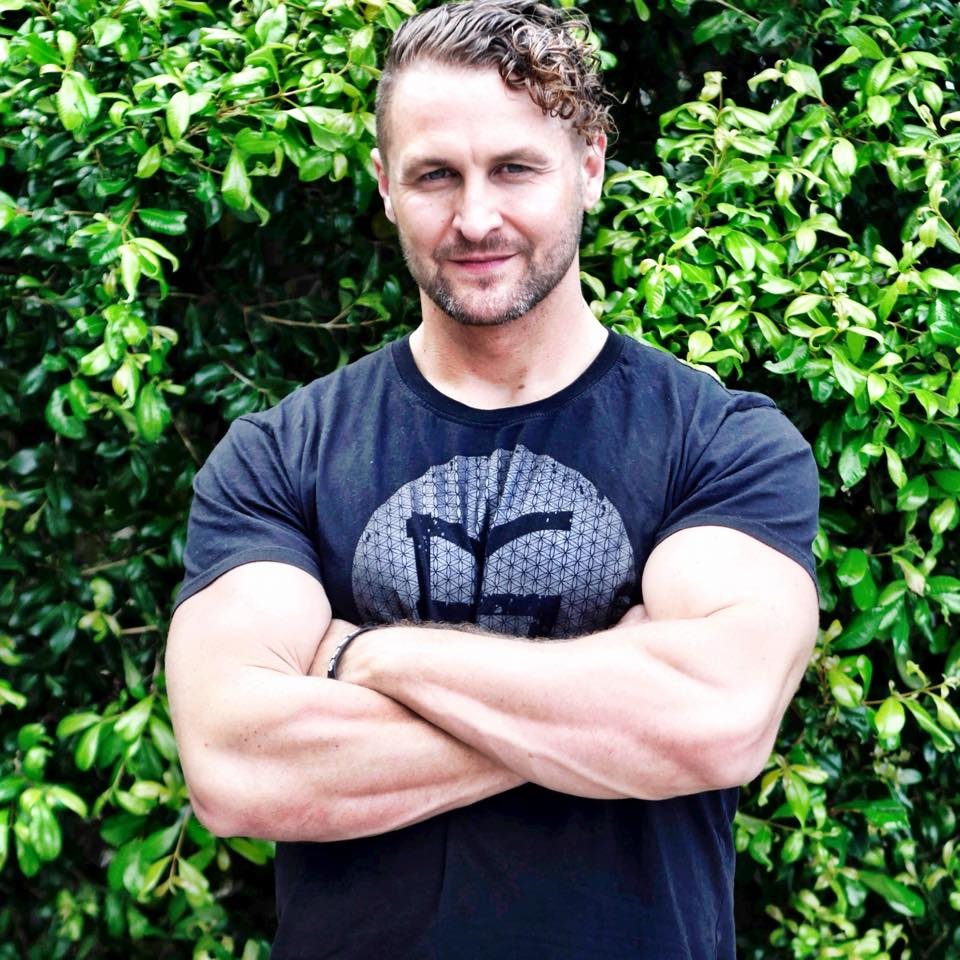
- Simmonds in 2017
- Born: 21 November 1980 (age 45); Sydney
- Occupation: Director of Eco Superfoods
- Known for: INBA Mr Universe 2009 Title

Billy Simmonds is an Australian entrepreneur, martial artist and winner of the 2009 INBA Mr Universe title. An authority in health and nutrition, he has served as a strength and conditioning coach to athletes around the world, and is the founding director of Eco Superfoods.

Whilst diverse in his pursuits, most notably Billy is an advocate for veganism, healthy eating, the environment and kindness towards people and animals.

== Career ==
On the day of his 18th birthday, Billy registered his first finance business called the Australian Credit Network. He pursued a career in finance for approximately 15 years working as a broker, financial planner and corporate banker. In 2011, he was awarded Corporate Solutions Executive of the Year by The Commonwealth Bank.

In 2012, Billy left his career in finance to launch PRANAON, a natural and vegan-friendly range of fitness nutrition products.

While developing PRANAON, Billy worked as a live action performer specialising in martial arts, dance and fire artistry. He was also part of the fight cast at Movie World in the Gold Coast, where his main character to perform was Batman.

In 2014, Billy co-founded Eco Superfoods, a 100% vegan company which has grown to become a multi million-dollar success. Today, the Eco Group of Companies develops, manufactures and distributes brands including PRANAON throughout Australia, New Zealand, the Middle East and South East Asia.

In 2015, PRANAON was awarded Vegan Supplement Brand of the Year, and Best Natural Product of 2016 by Australia's largest retailer of sports nutrition — Nutrition Warehouse.

In 2017, Billy was awarded Entrepreneur of the Year for Australia's Northern Region.

== Bodybuilding, Powerlifting & Fitness ==
In 2009, Billy made one of his most known achievements and won the INBA Mr Universe title in Hollywood, California. He was the first vegetarian/vegan to win the title since Bill Pearl in 1971.

While the myth still exists that a professional bodybuilder needs to consume vast amounts of meat and dairy to build muscle, Billy eats a purely vegan diet. In an interview with Living Vegan magazine, Billy states "Vegan Bodybuilding is not only possible, it’s optimal. Within three years from first lifting weights properly and walking on a bodybuilding stage as a novice, I had won Mr Universe and become a professional Bodybuilder. Steroids? Meat? Not a chance!"

Billy's muscle gain is 100% natural, proven by Olympic standard testing.

In 2014, Billy Simmonds was one of five professionally classed natural male bodybuilders in Australia, as defined by the World Anti-Doping Authority.

Billy is also a competitive Powerlifter with the International Powerlifting Federation, which follows the IOC and WADA drug testing standards. In 2011, Billy placed within the top five of his powerlifting division in Australia and won gold in the 102 kg Queensland State Titles.

In 2011, Billy broke two world records on national television in front of 45 million home viewers.

- Bench Press: Most Weight: 1 minute: 2,640 kg.
- Squats: 1 minute: 11 Reps with 82 kg (combined weight).

Today, Billy regularly participates in CrossFit and incorporates Olympic lifting to support his martial arts training.

== Lifting Statistics ==
- Bench: 150 kg
- Squat: 225 kg
- Deadlift: 275 kg
- Bicep Curl: 90 kg
- Clean & Press: 120 kg
- Leg Press: 120 kg

== Competition History ==
- 2007 INBA Queensland Titles 2nd Place
- 2008 CAPO Deadlift Competition 3rd Place
- 2009 INBA Brisbane Titles 2nd Place
- 2009 INBA Natural Olympia Equal 5th
- 2009 INBA Natural Universe 1st Place
- 2010 UQPWC IPF Powerlifting Summer 3rd Place
- 2010 UQPWC IPF Powerlifting Autumn 2nd Place 2011 UQPWC QLD State Titles 1st Place
- 2011 UQPWC QLD State Titles 1st Place
- 2014 CrossFit Open
- 2015 CrossFit Open
- 2016 CrossFit Open

== Advocacy Work and Public Speaking ==
Billy Simmonds has been a guest speaker at Green Earth Day, The Sustainable Living Festival, Vegan Business Lifestyle Tour, The Australian Fitness Industry and Leisure Show and World Vegan Day.

In 2016, Billy became the key spokesperson for a national high school speaking tour titled Strength in Kindness, which inspires young Australian's to lead fulfilling, ethical and healthy lifestyles.

Similarly in 2016, Billy partnered with Clean-up Jakarta Day and toured several high schools in Indonesia to teach students about the importance of recycling.

Billy has since expanded his outreach to groups experiencing hardship, such as those recovering from drug and alcohol addiction.

In 2019, Billy will publish his first book titled Strength in Kindness "Breaking limitations, smashing stereotypes, and generating limitless power and energy, through mindfulness and compassion".

== Martial Arts ==
Billy holds a second degree martial arts black belt in Hapkido and a third degree black belt in Taekwondo. He is skilled in numerous styles of martial arts including Muay Thai, Capoeira, Wushu and Brazilian jiu-jitsu.

In 2004, Billy moved to South Korea to teach Hapkido in the coastal mountains of Busan. In 2015, he returned to South Korea to advance to a higher level of black belt at Kukkiown, the headquarters of the World Taekwondo Federation. Billy was awarded Senior Student of the Year by the Tans Taekwondo organisation in 2015. He also competed in the 2016 Pan Pacific Masters Games winning 4th place in technical breaking and 2nd place in power-breaking.

== Role Models ==
Billy is inspired by Bruce Lee, Elon Musk, Tony Robbins, Richard Branson, and Arnold Schwarzenegger.
