= Freedom of religion in Ukraine =

Freedom of religion in Ukraine refers to the extent to which people in Ukraine are freely able to practice their religious beliefs, taking into account both government policies and societal attitudes toward religious groups.

Freedom of religion or belief in Ukraine is guaranteed by the country's constitution. In practice, freedom of religion or belief in Ukraine is under severe pressure due to the Russian war of aggression against Ukraine and its consequences, in particular the occupation of parts of Ukraine by Russia.

In 2023, the country scored 3 out of 4 for religious freedom in the Freedom in the World report of the non-profit organization Freedom House.

== Legal framework ==
Ukraine's laws guarantee the right of religious freedom, and provide a legal framework for the registration of religious groups.

=== Constitutional framework ===
The constitution provides for freedom of religion and worship. Article 35 of the Constitution of Ukraine lists freedom of religion or belief as a fundamental right:

"Everyone shall have the right to freedom of personal philosophy and religion. This right shall include the freedom to profess any religion or profess no religion, to freely practice religious rites and ceremonial rituals, alone or collectively, and to pursue religious activities.

The exercise of this right may be restricted by law only to protect the public order, health and morality of the population, or to protect the rights and freedoms of other persons.

The Church and religious organisations in Ukraine shall be separated from the State, and the school shall be separated from the Church. No religion shall be recognised by the State as mandatory.

No one shall be exempt from his/her duties to the State or refuse to abide by laws on religious grounds. If the performance of military duty contradicts the religious beliefs of a citizen, the performance of this duty shall be replaced by alternative (non-military) service."

By law the government may restrict this right only in the “interests of protecting public order, the health and morality of the population, or protecting the rights and freedoms of other persons.” The constitution provides for the separation of church and state. Ukraine has been described as having "relatively decent standards" when it comes to legal protections of religious freedom.

By law the objective of religious policy is to “restore full-fledged dialogue between representatives of various social, ethnic, cultural, and religious groups to foster the creation of a tolerant society and provide for freedom of conscience and worship.”

Government agencies authorized to monitor religious organizations include the Prosecutor General, the Ministry of Internal Affairs, and all other “central bodies of the executive government.”

=== Obligations under international law ===
Ukraine signed the International Covenant on Civil and Political Rights on 20 March 1968 and ratified it on 12 November 1973 (as part of the USSR), which includes the right to freedom of thought, conscience and religion in Article 18.

=== Religious organization registration ===
The law requires a religious institution seeking to receive official status as a legal entity to register both as a religious organization and as a nonprofit organization. To obtain official religious status an organization must register either with the Ministry of Culture, the government agency responsible for religious affairs, or with regional government authorities, depending upon the nature of the organization. Religious centers, administrations, monasteries, religious brotherhoods, missions, and religious schools register with the Ministry of Culture. Religious groups and congregations register with the regional authorities where they operate, either with the city government in Kyiv or the respective oblast government outside of Kyiv. While these religious groups and congregations may form the constituent units of a nationwide religious organization, the nationwide organization does not register on a national basis nor may it obtain recognition as a legal entity; rather, the constituent units register and obtain legal entity status.

Without legal entity status, a religious group may not own property, conduct banking activities, or publish materials. Per the stipulation against national registration, only the registered constituent units of a nationwide religious organization may own property or conduct business activities, either for themselves or on behalf of the nationwide organization. The law grants property tax exemptions to religious organizations and considers them nonprofit organizations.

Only registered religious groups may seek restitution of communal property previously confiscated by the government of the Soviet Union. Religious groups must apply to regional authorities for property restitution. The law states consideration of a restitution claim should be completed within a month. All major religious organizations have appealed the government to establish a more transparent process for addressing property restitution, and have complained that the process often takes longer than the month proscribed by law.

==== Eligibility requirements ====
To be eligible for registration, a religious group must have at least 10 adult members and must submit its statutes to the registration authorities. To obtain status as a nonprofit organization, a religious group must register with the Ministry of Justice, which is responsible for maintaining the government’s register of legal entities. This register lists all entities with this status, including religious ones. The law does not specify which of the two registration procedures must be undertaken first.

=== Religious organizations and the military and prisons ===
The law requires commanders of military units to allow their subordinates to participate in religious services but bans the creation of religious organizations in military institutions and military units. The Ministry of Defense defines selection criteria for clerics to become chaplains, the status of chaplains in the chain of command, and their rights and duties in the armed forces, National Guard, and State Border Guard Service. The law prohibits priests of the UOC-MP from serving as chaplains on military bases or in conflict zones, which has drawn protest from the UOC-MP.

The law allows alternative nonmilitary service for conscientious objectors. The law does not exempt the clergy from military mobilization.

The law gives prison chaplains access to both pretrial detainees and sentenced inmates. It also protects the confidentiality of confession heard by prison chaplains, prohibits the use of information received during confession as evidence in legal proceedings, and does not allow the interrogation of clerics, interpreters, or other persons about matters associated with the confidentiality of confession.

=== Regulations on religious education ===
It is forbidden to teach religion as part of the mandatory public school curriculum and states public school training “shall be free from interference by political parties, civic and religious organizations.” Public schools include ethics of faith or similar faith-related courses as optional parts of the curriculum.

Religious groups are allowed to establish theological schools to train clergy and other religious workers, as well as seek state accreditation through the Ministry of Culture for their curriculum. The law states theological schools shall function based on their own statutes.

=== Other rules and restrictions ===
According to the constitution, organizers must notify local authorities in advance of any type of planned public gathering, and authorities may challenge the legality of the planned event. According to a 2016 Constitutional Court decision, religious organizations need only to inform local authorities of their intention to hold a public gathering, and need not apply for permission or notify authorities within a specific period in advance of the event.

The Office of the Parliamentary Human Rights Ombudsman is constitutionally required to release an annual report to parliament with a section on religious freedom.

The law restricts the activities of foreign-based religious groups and defines the permissible activities of noncitizen clergy, preachers, teachers, and other representatives of foreign-based religious organizations. By law foreign religious workers may “preach, administer religious ordinances, or practice other canonical activities,” but they may do so only for the religious organization that had invited them and with the approval of the government body that registered the statute of the organization. Missionary activity is included under permissible activities.

== Challenges for freedom of religion and belief in Ukraine ==
=== Destruction of sacred buildings by Russia ===
According to the Ukrainian Institute for Religious Freedom (IRF), at least 630 sacred sites were damaged or destroyed by Russian attacks and assaults between 24 February 2022 and 1 December 2023 alone. These included 187 sites of the Ukrainian Orthodox Church, 110 sites of the Jehovah's Witnesses, 94 sites of Pentecostal churches, 60 sites of Baptist churches, 59 sites of the Orthodox Church of Ukraine and 27 sites of the Seventh-day Adventists, 25 sites of other evangelical churches, 21 sites of the Roman Catholic Church, 20 sites of the Greek Catholic Church, 12 synagogues and Jewish holy sites, 8 mosques and Muslim cultural centres and 7 Mormon sites. For example, religious buildings in Ukraine have been confiscated by the Russian military and misused for military purposes. In addition, Russia's repeated aerial and artillery attacks against Ukrainian civilian infrastructure have also caused massive damage to the country's religious infrastructure. Many religious sites have also fallen victim to Russian looting. The Institute for Religious Freedom states that its figures only include documented cases and that the actual extent of the destruction will presumably only be determined after the end of hostilities and is expected to be significantly larger.

=== Violations and restrictions of religious freedom by the Russian occupying forces ===
==== Violations and restrictions of religious freedom in occupied Crimea ====
The annexation of Crimea by Russia in March 2014 in violation of international law and the subsequent occupation regime led to massive restrictions on freedom of religion and belief in Crimea:

All religious communities registered under Ukrainian law had to re-register, this time following the regulations of the Russian occupation regime. As a result, numerous religious organisations had to cease their activities and some religious entities, including congregations belonging to the Roman Catholic Church and the Lutheran Church, were forced to undergo a review by the Russian Ministry of Justice. As a result of this review, the religious entities were obliged to remove all references to relations with Ukrainian bodies (e.g. dioceses and administrations) from their statutes.

According to the Ukrainian Institute for Religious Freedom, there have been abductions, torture and extrajudicial executions of members of various religious communities in the Russian-occupied territories since 2014. Corresponding human rights violations have increased further since the expansion of the Russian invasion on 24 February 2022.

Since 2017, when Jehovah's Witnesses were declared an extremist organisation in Russia, members of this religious group have also been persecuted in Crimea.

The occupying regime uses particularly severe reprisals against the Crimean Tatar Muslims, a population group that had already fallen victim to deportations by the totalitarian Soviet regime in 1944. Prominent representatives of the Crimean Tatars were banned from entering the country following the occupation of Crimea in violation of international law. The Russian government has detained and imprisoned several Crimean Tatars under the accusation of being affiliated with the Islamic fundamentalist group Hizb ut-Tahrir.

Other Muslim communities that refuse to submit to the Central Islamic Administration of the Russian Federation are also suffering repression.

The Orthodox Church of Ukraine refuses to register its congregations under Russian law. Their congregations are therefore subject to massive repression. Church services are regularly interrupted by Russian police and security forces and parish buildings are threatened with expropriation.

==== Violations and restrictions of religious freedom in the Russian-occupied territories in the Donbas ====
As a result of the invasion by Russia in violation of international law since 2014 and the annexations of September 2022, restrictions and violations of religious freedom by the Russian occupying forces, as can be observed in Crimea, have also spread to the territories occupied in the course of this aggression.

In 2016, the theologian Ihor Kozlovskyi was arrested by pro-Russian militias because he was accused of having pro-Ukrainian views. He was held in the Izoliatsiia prison camp until 2017 before being freed as part of a prisoner exchange.

In 2018, the self-declared Lugansk People's Republic (LPR) introduced a restrictive law on religion (Law #211-II ‘On Freedom of Conscience and Religious Organisations’), which made it mandatory for all religious communities to re-register within a period of six months and declared any religious community that had not received permission from the LPR regime to exist illegal. The LPR regime has implemented policies giving preference to the UOC-MP, and in particular discriminating against Protestant denominations. All Orthodox congregations that are not subordinate to the Moscow Patriarchate have been denied this permission. The secret police of the LPR State Security Ministry have also banned all congregations of the Ukrainian Baptist Union without a legal basis. Pentecostal churches, Seventh-day Adventists and other Protestant churches have also been denied registration. Religious meetings without the permission of the LPR regime have been penalised. Worship services of unregistered religious communities have been repeatedly disrupted. They have repeatedly been denied access to their own buildings. In addition, these communities have repeatedly been cut off from water, gas and electricity supplies. In a number of cases, church buildings have also been confiscated or vandalised. There has also been systematic surveillance of local religious communities, which has created a climate of fear. Contacts with religious communities in the free areas of Ukraine have been prohibited. For instance, a Catholic priest who had lived in Luhansk since 1993 was banned from returning there, which has also had a massive impact on local pastoral care. In addition to pastoral care, numerous social welfare activities carried out by non-registered religious communities have also had to be discontinued. All registered religious communities are obliged to provide regular detailed reports. Meetings of religious communities in private residential buildings have been banned.

Following the Russian example, the self-declared People's Republics of Lugansk (LPR) and Donetsk (DPR) have banned Jehovah's Witnesses and other ‘non-traditional’ faiths. The illegitimate regimes had already accused Jehovah's Witnesses of cooperating with the Ukrainian secret service SBU and neo-Nazi groups in 2017. Russian media have also frequently denounced Jehovah's Witnesses and the Kyiv Patriarchate as being "pro-fascist". The LPR and DPR regimes have detained and imprisoned members of the Jehovah’s Witnesses, and have confiscated several buildings belonging to the group.

In 2018, the last remaining mosque in Donetsk was closed after the imam and members of the congregation were searched and interrogated by armed forces. The DPR regime accused the congregation of being a ‘pseudo-religious Islamist organisation’ that spread extremist propaganda without providing any evidence.

According to Ukrainian media sources, in 2019 the authorities of the Donetsk People's Republic raided a mosque in Donetsk and confiscated religious materials under accusations of extremism, which the Ukrainian media and Ukrainian Muslim community described as false. Ukrainian security forces have also accused the Donetsk People's Republic of having paid agitators to vandalize UOC-MP properties with swastikas.

==== Violations and restrictions of religious freedom in Russian-occupied territories in the Zaporizhia, Kherson and Kharkiv oblasts ====
As a result of the occupation of territories in violation of international law since the further escalation of the Russian war of aggression against Ukraine on 24 February 2022 and the annexations of 2022 by Russia, restrictions and violations of religious freedom by the Russian occupying power, as observed in Crimea, also extended to the territories occupied in the course of this further aggression.

According to the Grand Archbishop Sviatoslav Shevchuk, the Primate of the Ukrainian Greek Catholic Church, the Greek Catholic Church has been de facto liquidated in the territories occupied by Russia. In the Zaporizhzhya region, for example, Catholic organisations such as Caritas or the Knights of Columbus have been banned. No Catholic priests remained in the occupied territories.

=== Tentions between security interests and religious freedom ===
As a result of Russian military aggression and interference since 2014, the Ukrainian government has deemed it necessary to assert the reservations laid down in the limitations of Article 35 of the Ukrainian constitution. In doing so, it invokes its right to intervene in the freedom of religious practice and the rights of self-determination of religious communities to an extent that complies with the principle of proportionality in order to avert specific threats to internal and external security. For example, clerics and employees of the Ukrainian Orthodox Church (Moscow Patriarchate) were investigated in over 70 cases because they were accused of collaboration, treason against the state or hate speech on religious grounds. On 20 August 2024, the Ukrainian parliament passed the ‘Law on the Protection of National and Public Security, Human Rights and Freedoms in the Field of Activities of Religious Organisations’. While independent experts have reaffirmed Ukraine's right to take measures to protect its own security, even if these involve interfering with the free exercise of religion and the rights of self-determination of religious communities, many experts also emphasise that such steps are only legitimate if they are targeted and comply with the principle of proportionality.

=== Social tensions and hate crime directed against religious communities and their members ===
==== Antisemitism ====
Anti-Semitic incidents are extremely rare in Ukraine. In 2018, the Association of Jewish Organisations and Communities of Ukraine (VAAD) documented a total of 12 cases of vandalism with an anti-Semitic background. At the same time, not a single anti-Semitically motivated assault on individuals was recorded. With President Volodymyr Zelenskyy (elected in 2019) and Prime Minister Denys Shmyhal (elected in 2020), two politicians hold the highest state offices who have Jewish ancestry. Oleksii Reznikov, Ukrainian Minister of Defence from 2021 to 2023, also comes from a Jewish family.

In autumn 2021, the Ukrainian government passed a law to combat anti-Semitism.

In 2016, the Ukrainian government initiated the establishment of the Babyn Yar Holocaust Memorial Centre. Almost 34,000 Jews were murdered by the German National Socialists at the site in autumn 1941. In March 2022, the memorial was damaged by a Russian missile attack.

==== Tensions surrounding the Ukrainian Orthodox Church ====
Before the Russian aggression against Ukraine began, the Ukrainian Orthodox Church of the Moscow Patriarchate (UOC-MP) was by far the largest church in Ukraine. However, due to its links to Russia, the church was increasingly met with scepticism by large sections of the population. In December 2018, numerous Orthodox parishes therefore split and founded the Orthodox Church of Ukraine (OCU). On 6 January 2019, the Patriarch of Constantinople, Bartholomew I, granted the OCU autocephaly. This recognised the OCU as a separate church that is independent of the Russian Orthodox Church. According to surveys conducted by the Kyiv International Institute of Sociology (KIIS) in 2022, 54% of Ukrainians identified with the OCU, only 4% still identified with the UOC-MP and a further 14% considered themselves Orthodox without specifying which church they belonged to. The split also led to social and political tensions, with some perceiving the Ukrainian Orthodox Church of the Moscow Patriarchate (UOC-MP) as complicit with the Russian aggressors and occupiers, which also led to occasional attacks against the church. Against this backdrop, independent experts urge the Ukrainian government to be sensitive in its dealings with the UOC-MP and OCU. Interference from the political side in internal church issues is considered by them to be counterproductive, carrying the risk of reinforcing existing stigmatisation. Instead of collectively taking action against an individual church, according to them it would be more appropriate to punish concrete cases of misconduct in which espionage and treason can be proven.

== Demographics ==
According to the October 2019 national survey conducted by the Razumkov Center, an independent public policy think tank, 64.9 percent of respondents self-identify as Orthodox Christian, 9.5 percent Greek Catholic, 1.8 percent Protestant, 1.6 percent Roman Catholic, 0.1 percent Jewish, and 0.1 percent Muslim. Another 8 percent self-identify as “simply a Christian” and 12.8 percent say they do not belong to any religious group. Small percentages of Buddhists, Hindus, adherents of other religions, and individuals not disclosing their religion make up the rest of the respondents.

However, 5 million people left the country in the first four months after the 2022 invasion.

=== Further breakdown of religious groups ===
The same Razumkov Center survey breaks down the 64.9 percent identifying as Christian Orthodox as 13.2 percent belonging to the newly formed Orthodox Church of Ukraine, 7.7 percent Ukrainian Orthodox Church - Kyiv Patriarchate (UOC-KP); 10.6 percent Ukrainian Orthodox Church (Moscow Patriarchate) (UOC-MP), 30.3 percent “just an Orthodox believer;” and 3.1 percent undecided. According to the Ministry of Culture, the UOC-KP has congregations in all oblasts of the country; the largest numbers of UOC-KP followers reside in the western and central regions of the country. The UOC-MP has congregations throughout the country. Most of the UAOC’s congregations are in the western part of the country.

Followers of the Ukrainian Greek Catholic Church, the largest non-Orthodox church with an estimated four million members, reside primarily in the western oblasts of Lviv, Lutsk, Ivano-Frankivsk, and Ternopil. The Roman Catholic Church has an estimated one million members. Most of its congregations are in Lviv, Khmelnytskyi, Zhytomyr, Vinnytsya, and Zakarpattia Oblasts.

The Evangelical Baptist Union of Ukraine is the largest Protestant community. Other Christian groups include Pentecostals, Seventh-day Adventists, Lutherans, Anglicans, Calvinists, Methodists, Presbyterians, Jehovah’s Witnesses, and the Church of Jesus Christ of Latter-day Saints.

Government agencies and independent think tanks estimate the Muslim population at 500,000. Some Muslim leaders put the number at two million. According to government figures, the majority are Crimean Tatars, numbering an estimated 300,000.

According to the government census data from 2001, 103,600 Jews live in the country, constituting approximately 0.2 percent of the population. The Association of Jewish Organizations and Communities (VAAD) states there are approximately 300,000 persons of Jewish ancestry in the country.

=== Territories affected by Russian military intervention ===
According to VAAD, before the Russian military intervention in eastern Ukraine, approximately 30,000 Jews lived in the Donbas region. Jewish groups estimate between 10,000 and 15,000 Jewish residents lived in Crimea before Russia’s annexation. There are also Buddhists, practitioners of Falun Gong, followers of the Baháʼí Faith and adherents of the International Society for Krishna Consciousness.

== History ==
=== Background ===
==== The Kievan church ====
Christianity, and specifically Byzantine Christianity, was adopted as the state religion of the Kievan Rus' in 988. Following the East–West Schism, the Kievan church remained in the Orthodox sphere. During this time period, Jews and Muslims were also present in the Kievan Rus', although these groups were generally seen as being distinct from ethnic Ukrainians or Rusyns. As the Kievan Rus' disintegrated in the 12th and 13th centuries, the territories corresponding to modern-day Ukraine were subject to various political religious poles of attraction: Russia in the east, Lithuania in the north, and Poland in the west. The Kievan church moved its seat to Moscow, and would split with the Byzantine Church in 1448, eventually completing its independence from Constantinople as the Russian Orthodox Church in 1598. However, former Kievan churches in the Grand Duchy of Lithuania retained their loyalty to Constantinople, and disputed the Russian Church's claim to being the true descendant of the Kievan church. In 1596, the former Kievan churches in Lithuania reunified with the Catholic Church as Eastern Catholic (also known as Uniate) churches).

==== Khmelnytsky uprising and the Russian Empire ====
The Khmelnytsky Uprising in the 17th century against the Polish–Lithuanian Commonwealth led by Ukrainian Cossacks was partly in response to attempts to pressure Orthodox Ukrainians to convert to Catholicism. The conflict saw large amounts of religiously motivated violence, with the rebel forces targeting Jews and Catholics. As a result of the war, the Russian Empire ended up annexing most ethnically Ukrainian territories. Subsequently, Russian Orthodoxy was promoted, and religious freedom was curtailed. Throughout the 19th and early 20th century, Jews in Ukraine, as well as elsewhere in the Russian Empire, were targeted by pogroms. In 1882, Alexander III of Russia instituted the May Laws, a series of discriminatory laws targeting Jews, which would remain in effect until the Russian Revolution in 1917.

==== Religion in the early Ukrainian nationalist movement ====
In the 18th and 19th century, Ukrainian nationalists agitating for an independent Ukrainian state viewed religious divisions as an obstacle to their national unity, and consciously de-emphasized religious identity in favor of secularism as the foundation of a Ukrainian identity.

=== Russian Empire, World Wars and inter-war period ===
Prior to the Russian Revolution, antisemitic laws were enforced in parts of Ukraine controlled by the Russian Empire, and anti-Jewish mob violence was a regular occurrence. Successive revolutionary governments repealed antisemitic legislature, but also conducted anti-religious campaigns, particularly in the 1920s and 1930s. By the 1940s, religious policy in Ukraine shifted, focusing on repressing religious tendencies associated with Ukrainian nationalism while favoring the Russian Orthodox Church, although the state still promoted atheism. During World War II, Jews were massacred by Nazi and Ukrainian nationalist factions, while the Soviet government deported Muslim Crimean Tatars, primarily to Uzbekistan. Religious persecution in the Soviet Union was halted in the 1980s, leading to a religious revival in Ukraine.

=== Soviet era ===
==== Early Soviet Union ====
During the Russian Revolution and the ensuing Russian Civil War, pogroms continued to be committed in Ukraine by various factions involved. The Ukrainian People's Republic and Russian Provisional Government abolished antisemitic laws, and in the case of the former Yiddish was adopted as a national language and Jews were represented in government positions.

Following the end of the Russian Civil War, Ukraine became a constituent republic of the Soviet Union. Relative religious freedom continued in the early 1920s, although the government instituted anti-religious campaigns against religion in general. Harsh repression was implemented in the late 20s and 1930s. Eastern Catholics were targeted for particularly harsh persecution, as the Soviet government was concerned that their ties to the Catholic Church could inspire anti-Soviet support from outside of the country. Evangelical Christians and Baptists were tolerated by Soviet authorities, as they were not viewed as a political threat by the government. Pentecostals, Seventh Day Adventists, Jehovah's Witnesses, and other tiny Protestant sects that were openly opposed to the state were banned outright. Roman Catholics, Jews and Muslims faced persecution.

===== Ukrainian churches in the early Soviet Union =====
For most of the 1920s, the Ukrainian Autocephalous Orthodox Church received some support from the Soviet government, as this church was perceived as a more progressive alternative to the monarchist Russian Orthodox Church. As the Church became associated with Ukrainian nationalism, however, the Soviet government reversed its position, and its leadership was arrested en masse between 1929 and the early 1930s, all but eliminating the church.

===== Judaism in early Soviet Ukraine =====
In the 1920s, anti-religious campaigns targeting Judaism in the Soviet Union were led by the Yevsektsiya, the Jewish section of the Communist Party. These campaigns sought to create a secular identity for ethnic Jews in Soviet society, in contrast to both religious and Zionist identities which were derided by the government as reactionary. As part of this program, the agencies KOMZET and later OZET were established to resettle Jews in agricultural collectives. OZET in particular attempted to resettle Jews in the Crimean peninsula.

In 1930, the Yevsektsiya was dissolved, leaving no central Jewish organization in the Soviet Union, secular or religious.

==== World War II and aftermath ====
During Nazi occupation, hundreds of thousands of Jews were killed by Nazi forces and Ukrainian nationalist groups.

The Ukrainian Church was reestablished under Nazi occupation; its clergy fled the country following the defeat of the German army and the Church once again disappeared inside Ukraine. In 1944, following the capture of Lviv, a center of Ukrainian Eastern Catholicism, Stalin ordered the arrest of clergy that did not convert to Russian Orthodoxy and transferred several thousand Eastern Catholic churches to the Russian Orthodox Church.

Crimean Muslims were subjected to mass deportation in 1944 when Joseph Stalin accused them of collaborating with Nazi Germany. More than 200,000 Crimean Tatars were deported to Central Asia, primarily the Uzbek SSR. It is estimated that more than 100,000 deportees died of starvation or disease due to the deportation. The property and territory abandoned by Crimean Tatars was appropriated by ethnic Russians who were resettled by the Soviet authorities, leading to large demographic changes in Crimea.

Soviet authorities arranged for an Orthodox synod in Lviv in 1946, where it was announced that the Ukrainian Eastern Catholic church had dissolved itself into the Russian Orthodox Church. No actual Eastern Catholic clergy were able to attend this synod as they had already been arrested, and the synod was denounced as a sham by Catholic and Eastern Catholic clergy outside the Soviet Union. According to Eastern Catholic sources, thousands of Eastern Catholics died as a result of persecution, and several thousand more had to serve prison sentences in labor camps.

Following the abolition of Ukraine's national churches, Russian Orthodoxy experienced a resurgence in Ukraine, with more Russian Orthodox churches existing in Ukraine than in Russia itself. Some followers of the national churches privately kept their faith while attending either Roman Catholic or Russian Orthodox services, while others practiced their faith clandestinely.

==== Glasnost era ====
While Soviet campaigns against religion waned in intensity following Stalin's death, the most significant thaw in Soviet attitudes towards religion would not occur until Mikhail Gorbachev's government instituted its glasnost policies in the 1980s, loosening restrictions against religion, freeing political prisoners of conscience and returning some confiscated properties to religious organizations.

In 1989, the Eastern Catholic church resurfaced in Ukraine, with hundreds of parishes across the republic renouncing their affiliation with the Russian Orthodox Church. Later that year, Gorbachev promised that the Soviet government would respect the religious freedom of Eastern Catholics in the Soviet Union. In 1990, the Russian Orthodox Church responded granted its Ukrainian division the title of Ukrainian Orthodox Church and some limited autonomy.

==== Legacy ====
Sociologists have suggested that a contributing factor toward religious tolerance in modern Ukraine is the legacy of a political alliance between religious dissidents of various faiths and secular Ukrainian dissidents in the Soviet Union.

=== Independent Ukraine ===
The liberalization of religious policies and subsequent collapse of the Soviet Union has also led to an increase of friction between Christian denominations in Ukraine, as dormant grievances (as well as grievances stemming from Soviet favoritism for the Russian Orthodox Church) have become relevant once more. As of 2019, ongoing disputes of jurisdiction between the Ukrainian Orthodox Church - Kyiv Patriarchate and the Ukrainian Orthodox Church Moscow Patriarchate have transformed into disputes between the UOC-MP and the newly canonized Orthodox Church of Ukraine. Communities have been given the opportunity to remain in the UOC-MP or re-affiliate with the OCU, and both the UOC-MP and OCU have accused each other of misconduct in the process of re-affiliation. Far-right Ukrainian nationalist groups such as Freedom have assaulted members of the Moscow Patriarchate and otherwise harassed them.

In 1992, the Ukrainian Eastern Catholic church received formal recognition from the Ukrainian government. However, it received only limited support from the Vatican, which limited its jurisdiction to Western Ukraine and ethnic Ukrainians.

Some religious groups have reported difficulties in legally acquiring property (including property previously confiscated by the government of the Soviet Union) due to discriminatory treatment by local government bodies.

Jews faced renewed antisemitism in the 1990s. There have been several instances of violence against Jews in Ukraine since 2013, although as of 2019 watchdog groups have stated that conditions are improving.

Vandalism against religious buildings and monuments is common, with many different denominations affected. Jewish and Roman Catholic buildings were among the most targeted.

On January 6, 2019, Patriarch Bartholomew I of Constantinople granted autocephaly to the Orthodox Church of Ukraine, canonically recognizing it as separate from the Russian Orthodox Church. United Nations observers reported that the process of transitioning congregations from the UOC-MP to the OCU occasionally led to violence, but that overall it led to "an overall trend of decreasing tensions between religious communities." The UN also expressed concern, however, at the participation of non-religious groups in the process, including local authorities and groups described as far-right. Accusations of far-right groups pressuring congregations to abandon the UOC-MP for the OCU were spread by Russian media. The UOC-MP and OCU have continued to feud over transition processes by which communities decide whether to re-affiliate with the OCU, with both churches alleging misconduct by the other.

On 2 December 2022, Ukrainian President Volodymyr Zelenskyy entered a bill to the Verkhovna Rada that would officially ban all activities of the Ukrainian Orthodox Church (Moscow Patriarchate) UOC in Ukraine.

==== Societal and political dealing with antisemitism ====
As part of implementing a 2015 decommunization and denazification law, several streets, buildings, and monuments have been renamed after 20th century Ukrainian nationalists, some of whom are associated with antisemitism.

Some members of parliament, such as Nadiya Savchenko have publicly used antisemitic rhetoric.

The party Svoboda annually held marches to commemorate Stepan Bandera's birthday, with thousands attending and some chanting antisemitic slogans.

Since 2013, there have been several instances of physical violence against Jews in Ukraine, some of which have been fatal. In one incident in 2017, three individuals threw a hand grenade at a group of Jews making pilgrimage to Uman. The grenade did not detonate, but caused injuries to a boy that was struck by it. Roughly 30,000 Jews travel to Uman each year for the Jewish New Year. According to a government spokesperson, the same three individuals also threw Molotov cocktails at a synagogue in Lviv (causing minor damage), and engaged in other attempted vandalism against Jewish buildings. The government claims that these individuals were primarily motivated to "smear Ukraine's reputation". In 2019, the independent National Minority Rights Monitoring Group reported no instances of violence against Jews and 14 cases of antisemitic vandalism. The NMRMG credited this improvement to an improvement in police response to antisemitic incidents. Some Jewish community leaders have continued to protest perceived impunity for cases of antisemitic conduct. Jewish community leaders have criticized the government's inaction over protection of historical landmarks with significance to the Jewish community.

According to a 2019 survey published by Pew Research, 83 percent of Ukrainians have favorable opinions of Jews, compared with 11 percent who have unfavorable attitudes, an increase in favorability since the prior study in 2009. A study by Razumkov found 17.4 percent of respondents had a favorable attitude towards Judaism, with 47.6 undecided indifferent, 22.3 percent undecided, 11 percent opposed, and 2 percent stating that they had never heard of the religion. These numbers also represent an increase in favorable attitudes over prior surveys conducted in 2018 and 2016.

==== Assaults against other religious communities ====
Supporters of the far-right Ukrainian nationalist Freedom party have assaulted members of the UOC-MP and conducted vandalism against its property.

Jehovah's Witnesses reported multiple incidences of assault against their membership. They have also expressed concern that the government has not prosecuted people accused of assaulting their members.

Members of the UOC-MP have disrupted religious ceremonies held by Protestant groups in public spaces, accusing them of "desecrating" the area.

In 2017, there were many reports of vandalism against public religious monuments and buildings of various denominations, but especially Jewish and Roman Catholic ones.

==== Allegations of state discrimination against religious minorities before the full-scale invasion of Russia ====
The government has banned clergy affiliated with the UOC-MP from serving as chaplains in the National Guard, referring to them as clerics from religious groups whose centers were "located in an aggressor state."

Roman Catholics, UOC-KP members, UGCC members, and Muslims have reported instances of discrimination by the government.

Small religious groups report discriminatory treatment by local governments with regard to the allocation of land for religious buildings in Ivano-Frankivsk, Mykolaiv, Odesa, and Ternopil Oblasts as well as the City of Kyiv.

UGCC, UOC-MP, and Latter-Day Saints groups have reported difficulties in obtaining legal rights to property.

In 2015, the government of Volyn Oblast allowed the construction of a private industrial plant on the grounds of a Jewish cemetery. This was protested by the Union of Councils for Jews in the Former Soviet Union, and the national government ordered the government of Volyn Oblast to rectify the situation. As of the end of 2017, the plant is still operational.

Kyiv's Muslim community said the local government, which allocates land for cemeteries, had not acted on the community's request for additional free land for Islamic burials, which was their legal right. Muslim community leaders said it was running out of land for it burials.

== See also ==
- Religion in Ukraine

== Bibliography ==
- Elsner, Regina (2024): Escalating the Populist Approach: The Case of Russia and the Significance of History, in: Religious Freedom and Populism: The Appropriation of a Human Right and How to Counter It. Bielefeld: transcript. Retrieved 9 May 2024.
- Little, David (1991). Ukraine: The Legacy of Intolerance. US Institute of Peace Press. ISBN 978-1-878379-12-2.
- Vasin, Maksym (2024). The impact of the Russian invasion on faith-based communities in Ukraine. Institute for Religious Freedom.
- 2023 Report on International Religious Freedom: Ukraine. United States Department of State.
