= Willie Simmons (inmate) =

American man convicted of robbery

Willie Junior Simmons is an Alabama resident sentenced to life without parole for first-degree robbery in 1982 for wrestling a man to the ground to steal his wallet, which contained US$9. Simmons, who had three prior nonviolent convictions, was prosecuted as a habitual offender under Alabama's Habitual Felony Offender Act (HFOA) and has been imprisoned in Atmore, Alabama, since 1982, originally at Holman Correctional Facility, and from the summer of 2021 at Fountain Correctional Facility, where he remained as of 2024, after 43 years.

== Early life ==
Simmons was born in 1957 and grew up poor in Enterprise, Alabama. After dropping out of high school, he was first arrested for grand larceny at the age of 17.

== Incident ==
In 1982, at the age of 25, Simmons wrestled down a man on the street and stole his wallet, containing $9. Simmons was arrested and convicted of first-degree robbery. Because he had three prior convictions, Alabama's HFOA at the time recommended that he be prosecuted as a habitual offender and sentenced to life in prison without the possibility of parole. All of Simmons' petitions for review and reconsideration of his sentence have been denied.

== Reaction ==
Simmons' sentence has attracted national attention. Several publications, including Essence magazine, NPR and the Washington Examiner, and celebrity activists such as Kim Kardashian have highlighted his story. Over three million people have signed an online petition on Change.org calling for his release. Citing Simmons' case as "an unjust and expensive failure," the Alabama chapter of the American Civil Liberties Union has called for the Alabama legislature to repeal the HFOA.
