= OpenPetition =

Free and non-profit online petition platform

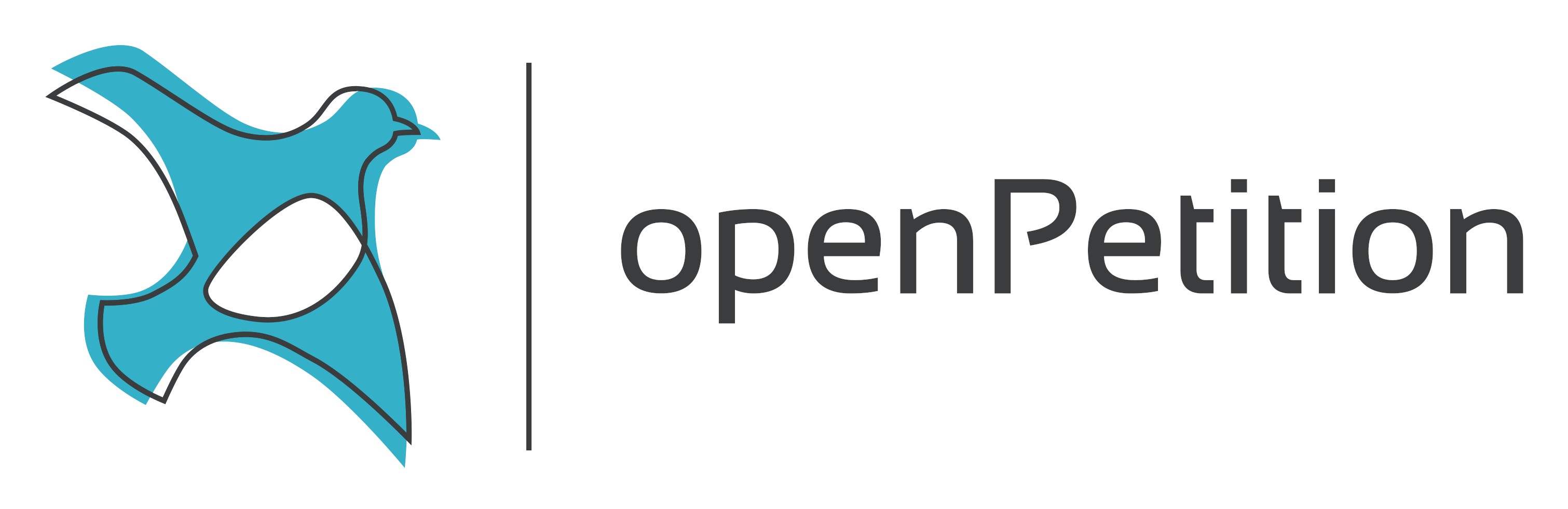
- Formation: 2010
- Founder: Jörg Mitzlaff
- Purpose: free online petitions
- Headquarters: Berlin, Germany
- Staff: 12
- Website: openpetition.org

openPetition is a free and non-profit online petition platform aimed at decision-makers in politics, business, and society. Founded in 2010, the goal of openPetition is to promote democracy and civic participation through online petitions and to contribute to a transparent dialogue between citizens and policymakers. openPetition has over 7 million users and is based in Berlin, Germany.

Citizens can use openPetition to advocate for and against local initiatives such as the unsuccessful attempt to ban fireworks for the Rhine in Flames event.

In August 2026, an openPetition was circulated protesting the Immanuel Clinic Bernau's plans to close the specialist department for gynecology and obstetrics.

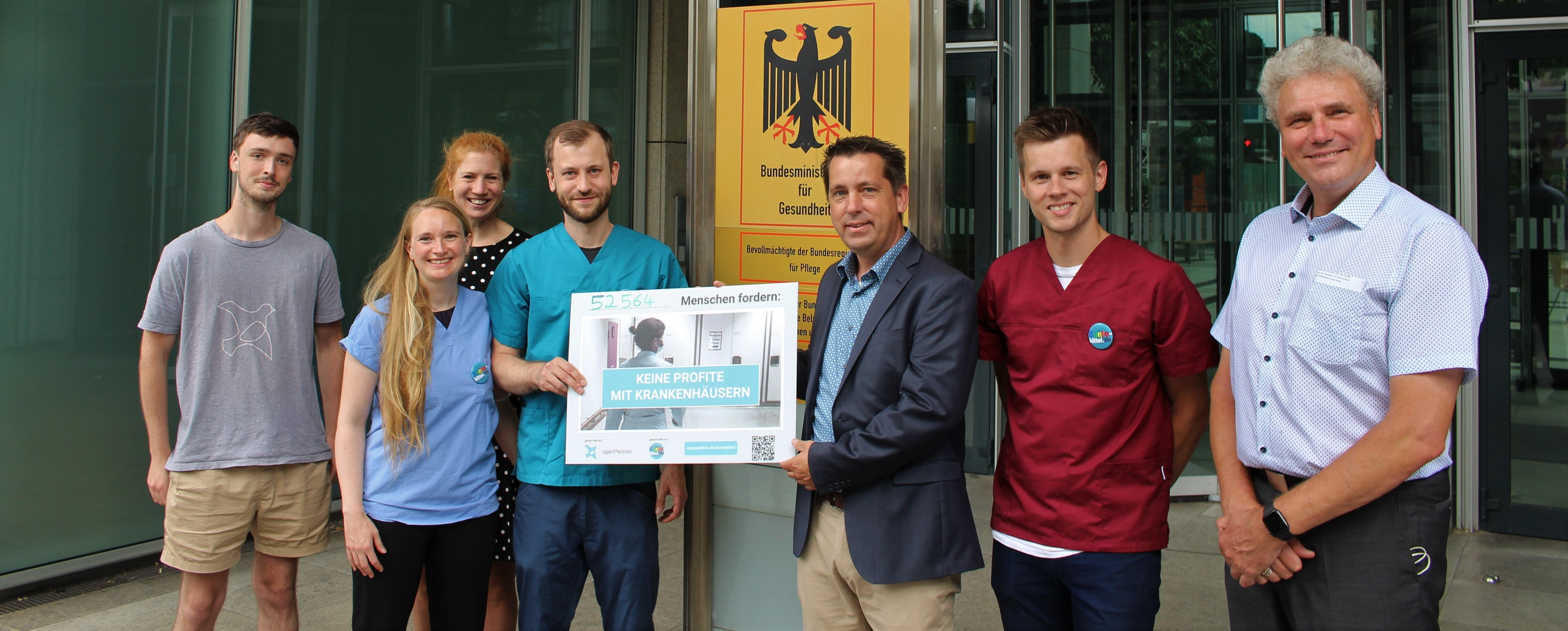
A petition with 52,564 signatures shared with the Federal Ministry of Health (Germany)

== External link ==
- openPetition Homepage
