= 96.1 FM =

FM radio frequency

The following radio stations broadcast on FM frequency 96.1 MHz:

== Argentina ==
- Pop Radio in Rosario, Santa Fe
- Radio María in Colón, Buenos Aires
- Radio María in Corrientes
- Radio María in Esquina, Corrientes
- Radio María in Crespo, Entre Ríos
- Radio María in Gualeguaychu, Entre Ríos

== Australia ==
- 2ONE in Sydney, New South Wales and Katoomba, New South Wales
- 4NNN in Sunshine Coast, Queensland
- 5SEF in Mount Gambier, South Australia
- ABC Classic in Shepparton, Victoria
- 6NOW in Perth, Western Australia

== Belize ==
- Ak'Kutan Radio at Blue Creek

Aurelio Sho-Community Radio Specialist Blue Creek Village Toledo District, Belize

- Founder of first Maya Community based Radio- Ak' Kutan Radio.

== Canada (Channel 241) ==
- CBCJ-FM in Timmins, Ontario
- CBCN-FM in North Bay, Ontario
- CBCT-FM in Charlottetown, Prince Edward Island
- CBF-FM-11 in Asbestos, Quebec
- CBM-FM-2 in Quebec City, Quebec
- CBRX-FM-2 in Sept-Iles, Quebec
- CFMY-FM in Medicine Hat, Alberta
- CFNR-FM-1 in Quesnel, British Columbia
- CFNR-FM-2 in Fort Nelson, British Columbia
- CFNR-FM-4 in Laxgalts'ap, British Columbia
- CFNR-FM-5 in Hartley Bay, British Columbia
- CFNR-FM-6 in Houston, British Columbia
- CHGG-FM in Limestone, Manitoba
- CHKG-FM in Vancouver, British Columbia
- CHMY-FM in Renfrew, Ontario
- CINB-FM in Saint John, New Brunswick
- CJEN-FM in Jenpeg, Manitoba
- CKIP-FM in Grand'Terre, Newfoundland and Labrador
- CKPX-FM in Kispiox, British Columbia
- CKRW-FM in Whitehorse, Yukon
- CKX-FM in Brandon, Manitoba
- VF2072 in Good Hope Indian Reserve, British Columbia
- VF2073 in Quesnel Reserve, British Columbia
- VF2077 in Moberly Lake, British Columbia
- VF2078 in Lower Post, British Columbia
- VF2079 in Masset Indian Reserve, British Columbia
- VF2110 in Blueberry River, British Columbia
- VF2111 in Burns Lake, British Columbia
- VF2112 in Doig River, British Columbia
- VF2113 in Fort Ware, British Columbia
- VF2114 in Iskut, British Columbia
- VF2115 in Kincolith, British Columbia
- VF2116 in Kitimat, British Columbia
- VF2118 in Kitwancool, British Columbia
- VF2120 in Telegraph Creek, British Columbia
- VF2133 in Atlin, British Columbia
- VF2162 in Halfway River, British Columbia
- VF2164 in Takla Landing, British Columbia
- VF2170 in Port Simpson, British Columbia
- VF2227 in Klemtu, British Columbia
- VF2228 in Nemaiah Valley, British Columbia
- VF2233 in Bella Coola, British Columbia
- VF2235 in Williams Lake, British Columbia
- VF2237 in Anahim Lake, British Columbia
- VF2238 in Redstone Flat Indian Reserve, British Columbia
- VF2271 in Aiyansh, British Columbia
- VF2272 in Alkali Lake, British Columbia
- VF2273 in McLeod Lake, British Columbia
- VF2276 in Dog Creek, British Columbia
- VF2279 in Ingenika, British Columbia

== China ==
- CNR Music Radio in Lhasa

== Greece ==
- Minore 96.1 in Thessaloniki
- Marconi Radio in Volos

== Ireland ==
- Cork's 96FM (north County Cork)
- Midlands 103 in Castlepollard

== Malaysia ==
- 988 FM in Kedah, Perlis & Penang
- Era in Kuching, Sarawak
- Suria in Kuantan, Pahang

== Mexico ==
- XEUN-FM in Mexico City
- XHACA-FM in Acapulco, Guerrero
- XHECS-FM in Manzanillo, Colima
- XHEOH-FM in Ciudad Camargo, Chihuahua
- XHEOO-FM in Tepic, Nayarit
- XHESW-FM in Ciudad Madera, Chihuahua
- XHEZAR-FM in Puebla, Puebla
- XHGPE-FM in Guadalupe, Zacatecas
- XHOB-FM in San Luis Potosí, San Luis Potosí
- XHON-FM in Tampico, Tamaulipas
- XHPLPM-FM in La Piedad, Michoacán
- XHPPLY-FM in Playa del Carmen, Quintana Roo
- XHPSJL-FM in San Juan de los Lagos, Jalisco
- XHSANR-FM in San Rafael, Veracruz
- XHSIBM-FM in Ixhuatlán De Madero, Veracruz
- XHSIC-FM in Córdoba, Veracruz
- XHTAM-FM in Ciudad Victoria, Tamaulipas
- XHTGZ-FM in Tuxtla Gutiérrez, Chiapas
- XHUAS-FM in Culiacán, Sinaloa
- XHXC-FM in Taxco, Guerrero

== Nigeria ==
- Lagos Traffic Radio in Lagos, Nigeria

== Philippines ==
- DWXT in Tarlac City, Tarlac
- DXSP in Surigao City, Surigao
- DYIB in Tanjay, Negros Oriental
- DXSF in San Francisco, Agusan Del Sur
- DWJR in Calabanga, Camarines Sur
- DXSY in Ozamiz, Misamis Occidental

== Romania ==
- Kiss FM (Romania) in Bucharest

== Sri Lanka ==
- Hiru FM (Also on 96.3 MHz)

== Taiwan ==
- Alian Radio in Miaoli and Chiayi

== Trinidad & Tobago ==
- WEFM (Trinidad and Tobago)

== United Kingdom ==
- BBC Radio Cumbria in Morecambe Bay
- Greatest Hits Radio South Yorkshire in Rotherham and Sheffield
- Heart East in Colchester
- Original 106 in Central and East Fife

== United States (Channel 241) ==
- KACR-LP in Alameda, California
- KAGG in Madisonville, Texas
- KANS in Emporia, Kansas
- KBEX in Dalhart, Texas
- KBPT-LP in Bishop, California
- KBRP-LP in Bisbee, Arizona
- KBTQ in Harlingen, Texas
- KCDF-LP in Houston, Texas
- KCEL in Mojave, California
- KCTX-FM in Childress, Texas
- KCWD in Harrison, Arkansas
- KDOL-LP in Livingston, Texas
- KEXU-LP in Oakland, California
- KEYE in Perryton, Texas
- KFOO in Opportunity, Washington
- KIBT in Fountain, Colorado
- KICX-FM in Mccook, Nebraska
- KINI in Crookston, Nebraska
- KIOX-FM in Edna, Texas
- KIRP-LP in Sugar Land, Texas
- KISO in Omaha, Nebraska
- KITO-FM in Vinita, Oklahoma
- KIXX in Watertown, South Dakota
- KJTZ-LP in Alameda, California
- KKLX in Worland, Wyoming
- KKTX in Kilgore, Texas
- KLKY in Stanfield, Oregon
- KLPX in Tucson, Arizona
- KLRQ in Clinton, Missouri
- KMRK in Odessa, Texas
- KMRX in El Dorado, Arkansas
- KMXG in Clinton, Iowa
- KNKR-LP in Hawi, Hawaii
- KNOM in Nome, Alaska
- KNWM in Madrid, Iowa
- KORQ in Winters, Texas
- KPEA-LP in Sausalito, California
- KPQN in Roswell, New Mexico
- KQHT in Crookston, Minnesota
- KQPR in Albert Lea, Minnesota
- KRQB in San Jacinto, California
- KRVE in Brusly, Louisiana
- KSLY in San Luis Obispo, California
- KSME in Greeley, Colorado
- KSQQ in Morgan Hill, California
- KSRV-FM in Ontario, Oregon
- KSTR in Montrose, Colorado
- KTRU-LP in Houston, Texas
- KUIM in Bethel, Alaska
- KWFI-FM in Aberdeen, Idaho
- KWRK in Window Rock, Arizona
- KXJR in Chama, New Mexico
- KXXM in San Antonio, Texas
- KXXO in Olympia, Washington
- KXXY in Oklahoma City, Oklahoma
- KYDO in Campo, California
- KYKZ in Lake Charles, Louisiana
- KYMX in Sacramento, California
- KYPZ in Fort Benton, Montana
- KYTO in Shingletown, California
- KYYZ in Williston, North Dakota
- KZEL in Eugene, Oregon
- KZRC in Bennington, Oklahoma
- WAEL in Maricao, Puerto Rico
- WBBB in Raleigh, North Carolina
- WBUB-LP in Portsmouth, New Hampshire
- WCBF in Elmira, New York
- WCFI-LP in Cuyahoga Falls, Ohio
- WCTO in Easton, Pennsylvania
- WDEV in Warren, Vermont
- WDKE (FM) in Coleraine, Minnesota
- WEJZ in Jacksonville, Florida
- WHBX in Tallahassee, Florida
- WHNN in Bay City, Michigan
- WHQC in Shelby, North Carolina
- WIHW-LP in Dover, Delaware
- WIVG in Tunica, Mississippi
- WJMC-FM in Rice Lake, Wisconsin
- WJSY-LP in Newport, Vermont
- WJVC in Center Moriches, New York
- WKFM in Huron, Ohio
- WKKQ in Barbourville, Kentucky
- WKST in Pittsburgh, Pennsylvania
- WKWS in Charleston, West Virginia
- WKZQ in Forestbrook, South Carolina
- WLKG in Lake Geneva, Wisconsin
- WLNT-LP in Loudon, Tennessee
- WLXO in Stamping Ground, Kentucky
- WLXR in Tomah, Wisconsin
- WLZA in Eupora, Mississippi
- WMAX in Holland, Michigan
- WMQR in Broadway, Virginia
- WTSS in Buffalo, New York
- WMTR in Archbold, Ohio
- WODZ in Rome, New York
- WOHK in Ashtabula, Ohio
- WPKF in Poughkeepsie, New York
- WQHR in Presque Isle, Maine
- WQKS in Montgomery, Alabama
- WQLK in Richmond, Indiana
- WQQB in Rantoul, Illinois
- WRKH in Mobile, Alabama
- WROJ-LP in St. Cloud, Minnesota
- WROX in Exmore, Virginia
- WRXK in Bonita Springs, Florida
- WSOX in Red Lion, Pennsylvania
- WSRS in Worcester, Massachusetts
- WSTO in Owensboro, Kentucky
- WTCX in Ripon, Wisconsin
- WTMP in Dade City, Florida
- WTTH in Margate City, New Jersey
- WVLF in Norwood, New York
- WWID-LP in Orlando, Florida
- WWKS in Charlotte Amalie, Virgin Islands
- WWPW in Atlanta, Georgia
- WXFL in Florence, Alabama
- WZPP-LP in Hollywood, Florida
