= Dadan Sivunivut =

Canadian Indigenous media company

Dadan Sivunivut (Dadan is Southern Tutchone for "Our Peoples" and Sivunivut is "Our Future" in Inuktitut) is an Indigenous multimedia content creation and distribution company based in Winnipeg, Canada. It was established in December 2019 by Aboriginal Peoples Television Network, Inc as "an arms-length, independent company with the responsibility to manage and expand the group of companies that had been established in the previous 12 years under the APTN umbrella". The companies transferred from APTN to Dadan Sivunivut included First Peoples Radio, which operated ELMNT FM radio stations CFPT-FM in Toronto and CFPO-FM in Ottawa, the All Nations Network (ANN) which uses the Xfinity streaming service in the United States; Nagamo publishing, a music rights agency devoted to Indigenous artists; and Red Music Rising (RMR), a music talent agency also devoted exclusively to the Indigenous musical community; Animiki See Digital Production which produces Indigenous television and digital media content; and ASD (Animiki See Distribution) which distributes Indigenous content internationally including scripted and unscripted programs, feature films, documentaries and series in factual entertainment, current affairs, kids, animation, lifestyle, comedy and drama.

== History ==
In 2008, AnimikiSee Digital Productions (ASDP) and AnimikiSee Distribution (ASD) were established. ASDP was established to help unknown Indigenous producers get recognized and give them the funding for their productions, it is now is a big production house that produces original Indigenous productions and is also now a production service provider to other small independent Indigenous producers who need support from a production. ASD takes the content and brings it to international markets. In 2014, an initiative to create an American Indigenous television station named All Nations Network (ANN) and was modeled after Canada's APTN, ANN eventually launched on Xfinity, Comcast's streaming service. In 2017, APTN licensed two radio stations under a not-for-profit corporation called First Peoples Radio (FPR), it is branded as ELMNT FM and 30% of the music is from Indigenous musicians/artists. And in 2019, APTN launched two companies to support Indigenous music, Red Music Rising (a music talent agency for Indigenous artists) and Nagamo (a music rights agency for Indigenous artists) and are supported by allies like Bedtracks with Nagamo and Coalition Music with Red Music Rising.

== First Peoples Radio ==
On June 14, 2017, a subsidiary of APTN, First Peoples Radio Inc. (FPR), was granted licences by the CRTC to operate radio stations in Toronto and Ottawa aimed at urban Indigenous populations in those cities. The Ottawa station will broadcast on 95.7 FM and the Toronto station will use 106.5 FM. Both frequencies had previously been allocated to Aboriginal Voices Radio which had its licences revoked in 2015. FPR had also applied for licences in Edmonton, Calgary, and Vancouver but the CRTC granted these to other applicants.

First Peoples Radio Inc had originally announced that its two radio stations, CFPT-FM in Toronto and CFPO-FM in Ottawa, were to go on the air by June 2018 but later delayed its soft launch until October 24, 2018. FPR will produce and share programming with the Missinipi Broadcasting Corporation in Saskatchewan and Native Communications Incorporated in Manitoba and is also in talks with the Aboriginal Multi-Media Society, which has been granted radio licences in Edmonton and Calgary, and Northern Native Broadcasting (Terrace), which operates an Indigenous radio station in Terrace, British Columbia, and has been granted a licence to operate a radio station in Vancouver, about potential programming partnerships.

The stations first went on the air on October 24, 2018, at noon, branded as Elmnt FM.

In 2019, APTN established Dadan Sivunivut as "an arms-length, independent company with the responsibility to manage and expand the group of companies that had been established in the previous 12 years under the APTN umbrella", including First Peoples Radio.

In May 2024, the CRTC rejected an application by First Peoples Radio requesting that $2 million in tangible benefits funding being paid by Stingray Group be redirected for two years to support CFPT-FM Toronto and its Ottawa sister station CFPO-FM. FPR chairman Jean LaRose said the application was a last ditch effort to keep the stations operational due to the impact the COVID-19 pandemic has on advertising revenue. Staff at the stations had been cut from 26 to 6 leaving no on-air personalities. As a result of the CRTC decision "we have to see just how far we can go and decide whether we have to close in the coming months if we’re not seeing growth in advertising revenue,” said LaRose.

Both stations ceased operations on September 1, 2025. In February 2026, the CRTC issued a formal call for new applications to serve indigenous communities in Toronto and Ottawa with new radio stations.
