= Aboriginal Peoples Television Network =

Canadian television network

- Country: Canada
- Broadcast area: National
- Headquarters: Winnipeg, Manitoba

Programming
- Languages: English, French
- Picture format: 1080i HDTV (downscaled to letterboxed 480i for the SDTV feed)

Ownership
- Owner: Aboriginal Peoples Television Network Inc.

History
- Launched: January 21, 1992; 34 years ago
- Former names: Television Northern Canada (1992–1999)

Links
- Website: www.aptntv.ca

Availability

Terrestrial
- Whitehorse, YT: CHWT-TV 10
- Yellowknife, NT: CHTY-TV 11
- Other Areas: See Below

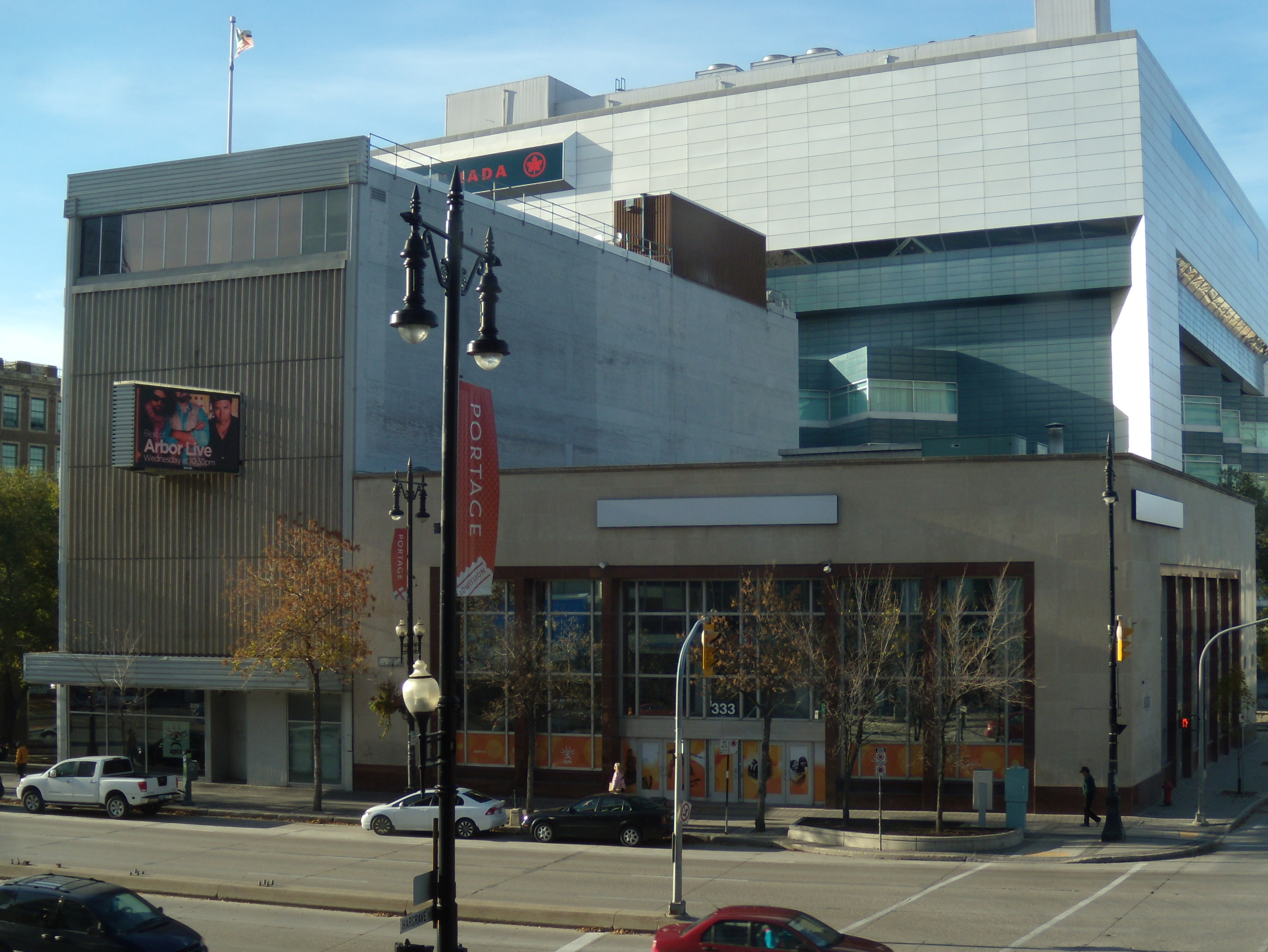
APTN building on Portage Avenue in Winnipeg, Manitoba

Aboriginal Peoples Television Network (APTN; French: Réseau de télévision des peuples autochtones, Inuktitut: ᑕᓚᕖᓴᒃᑯᑦ ᓄᓇᖃᖅᑳᖅᓯᒪᔪᑦ ᐃᓄᖏᑦ, romanized: Talaviisakkut nunaqaqkaaqsimajut inungit) is a group of Canadian specialty television channels; the channels broadcast programming produced by or highlighting Indigenous peoples in Canada, including arts, cultural, documentary, entertainment, and news and current affairs programming. Its headquarters are located at 399 Portage Avenue in Downtown Winnipeg.

Established in 1992 as Television Northern Canada (TVNC) to broadcast in Canada's northern territories, TVNC received a CRTC licence as a television network in 1999—requiring that it be carried by all television providers nationwide. It relaunched as APTN on September 1, 1999.

APTN was previously structured as a regionalized service, being carried on terrestrial television in Northern Canada and the Inuit communities of Newfoundland and Labrador and Quebec, national North, East, and West feeds on television providers, and a national high definition feed. APTN HD was initially a straight simulcast of the East feed, but was later restructured to allow more flexibility in scheduling.

Historically, APTN has carried programming in English and French, as well as programming produced in Indigenous languages and subtitled in either English or French. In September 2024, APTN restructured its operations into two channels, with Indigenous language programming spun off onto the new channel APTN Languages (APTNL).

== History ==
=== Establishment ===
Logo while under the name Television Northern Canada (TVNC)

In 1980, the Canadian Radio-Television and Telecommunications Commission (CRTC) issued the Therrien Committee Report. In that report, the committee concluded that northern Indigenous peoples had increasing interest in developing their own media services and that the government has a responsibility to ensure support in broadcasting of Indigenous cultures and languages. The committee recommended measures to enable northern native people to use broadcasting to support their languages and cultures.

The Canadian government created the Northern Broadcasting Policy, issued on March 10, 1983. It laid out principles to develop Northern native-produced programming. The policy included support for what was called the Northern Native Broadcast Access Program, a funded program to produce radio and/or television programs in First Peoples' languages to reflect their cultural perspectives.

Soon after the program's creation, problems were recognized in the planned program distribution via satellite. In January 1987, Canadian aboriginal and Northern broadcasters met in Yellowknife, Northwest Territories to form a non-profit consortium to establish a Pan-Northern television distribution service. In 1988, the Canadian government gave the organizers $10 million to establish the network. The application for the new service, initially known as Television Northern Canada (TVNC), was approved by the CRTC in 1991. The network officially launched on over-the-air signals to the Canadian territories and far northern areas of the provinces on January 21, 1992.

=== National expansion and re-launch ===
After several years broadcasting in the territories, TVNC began lobbying the CRTC to amend their licence to allow TVNC to be broadcast nationally; they promoted the "uniqueness" and "significance" of a national Aboriginal service. On February 22, 1999, the CRTC granted TVNC a licence for a national broadcast network.

On September 1, 1999, the network also re-branded as the Aboriginal Peoples Television Network (APTN). It was added to all television providers across Canada. APTN was the first national public television network for indigenous peoples. The licensing gave APTN the same status as CBC Television, Radio-Canada and TVA. All Canadian cable and satellite television providers have been required to include it in their basic service. However, many cable companies outside the Arctic placed it above channel 60 on their systems, rendering it inaccessible to older cable-ready television sets that do not go above channel 60. The CRTC considered requiring cable companies to move APTN to a lower channel, but decided in 2005 that it would not do so.

In March 2008, APTN launched a high definition channel known as APTN HD; initially, APTN HD was a straight simulcast of APTN's Eastern cable feed, complying with the requirement that a specialty channel's HD simulcast must be 95% identical in programming and scheduling to its standard-definition feeds. In May 2017, the CRTC amended APTN's licence so that APTN HD's programming would no longer necessarily have to mirror the scheduling of the SD feeds, as long as 95% of its programming had aired at some point on one of APTN's SD feeds. The network argued that this change would allow it more flexibility in scheduling programming on APTN HD to reach a broader audience.

In 2019, APTN launched APTN Lumi, a streaming service distributing APTN programming on the internet and streaming television devices.

=== Transition to two-channel service ===
In June 2023, as part of a CRTC licence renewal, APTN proposed a restructuring of its linear services. It proposed a switch to two national feeds in high definition, with one predominantly carrying English- and French-language programming, and the other predominantly airing programming in Indigenous languages. APTN stated that the new structure would allow it to significantly increase its output of Indigenous-language programming to as many as 157.5 hours per-week, and provide more airtime to language groups that were underrepresented under its existing schedule and structure.

In May 2024, the CRTC approved the licence renewal and distribution changes, which took effect September 1, 2024: APTN was split into channels, branded as APTN and APTN Languages. APTN carries English and French-language programming (with the CRTC requiring a minimum of 20 hours per-week of French programming), while APTN Languages carries at least 100 hours of programming per-week in at least 15 Indigenous languages, along with additional airings of its English and French-language news and public affairs programming. To facilitate the new service, the CRTC also approved an increase in APTN's wholesale carriage fee from $0.35 per-subscriber to $0.38.

In October 2025, APTN launched the free ad-supported streaming television (FAST) channel "APTN Beyond", which carries APTN library programming with a focus on paranormal and spiritual themes. The following month, APTN Lumi was rebranded as "APTN+".

== Programming ==
APTN primarily airs programming highlighting Indigenous peoples in Canada, including arts and cultural programs, factual programming such as documentaries and docuseries, drama and comedy series, and news and current affairs programming. The channel also occasionally broadcasts mainstream feature films; in 2002, the network experimented with adding a sweepstakes known as Bingo and a Movie during commercial breaks.

APTN primarily broadcasts programming produced in English, French, and Indigenous languages, such as Cree and Inuktitut. All Indigenous-language programming is presented with subtitles in either English or French.

Programs which have aired on APTN include:

- Acting Good
- APTN National News
- APTN Contact
- Arbor Live!
- Bears' Lair
- Blackstone
- Bro'Town
- Bones of Crows
- Bordertown
- By The Rapids
- The Candy Show
- Cashing In
- Caution: May Contain Nuts
- Chuck and the First Peoples Kitchen
- Cooking With the Wolfman
- Cultural Craftsmanship: Moccasins
- D dot H
- Dr. Savannah: Wild Rose Vet
- The Deerskins
- Delmer & Marta
- DJ Burnt Bannock
- Don't Even
- First Across the Line
- First Contact
- First Music and Arts
- Finding Our Talk: A Journey Through Aboriginal Languages the world's first series in Mohawk language, three seasons (2001, 2002, 2009)
- Friday Night Thunder
- Fugget About It
- Future History
- Get Your Fish On
- Gespe'gewa'gi: The Last Land
- Ghost Hunters of the Grand River
- Going Native
- Guides and Gurus
- Guilt Free Zone
- Hard Rock Medical
- Haudenosaunee Canoe Journey
- Horse Warriors
- Icons
- Inconvenient Indian
- Jason
- Little Big Community
- Little Bird
- Maamuitaau
- Making A Scene
- Medicine Woman
- Merchants of the Wild
- Michif Country
- Mixed Blessings
- Moccasin Flats
- Mohawk Girls
- Moosemeat & Marmalade
- My TV
- Nations at War
- Native New Yorker
- nîpawistamâsowin: We Will Stand Up
- North of 60
- North of North
- Northern Exposure
- On The Front Line
- One Dish One Spoon
- One With Nature
- La piqure
- Petroglyphs to Pixels
- Pow Wow Chow
- Queen of the Oil Patch
- Querencia
- Quest Out West: Wild Food
- Rabbit Fall
- Red Earth Uncovered
- Rez Bluez
- Secret History
- Shadow of the Rougarou
- Shortland Street
- Skindigenous
- Spirit Talker
- Storytellers in Motion
- Tales from the Rez
- The Feather News
- The Other Side
- The Sharing Circle
- Treaty Road
- Tribal
- Warriors: TKO
- Water Worlds
- Wentworth
- Wild Archaeology
- Wild Rose Vets
- Yukon Harvest

=== Children's programming ===
APTN airs children's programming, primarily as part of the APTN Kids block and branding. This block ranges from ages 3-11.

Original programming

- Anaana's Tent
- Anash and the Legacy of the Sun-Rock
- Animism: The Gods' Lake
- Artie the Ant a.k.a. The Adventures of Artie the Ant
- Bizou
- CG Kids
- Chic Choc
- Chums
- Coyote's Crazy Smart Science Show
- Doggy Day School
- The Adventures of Dudley the Dragon (both English and French dubs)
- The Eggs
- Fire Quest
- Fruity Tales
- Guardians Evolution
- Indigenous Art Adventures
- Inuk
- Kagagi: The Raven
- La Crosse Goals
- Lil Glooscap and the Legends of Turtle Island
- The Link
- Little Bear
- Louis Says
- Missy Milly
- Mouki
- Nehiyawetan
- The New Adventures of Lucky Luke
- Planet Echo
- Qanurli
- The Raccoons
- Raven Tales
- renegadepress.com
- Road Scholars
- Stories of Our Elders
- Takuginai
- Tamanevugut
- Tiga Talk
- Tipi Tales
- That's AWSM!
- The Nature Show
- Total Drama: Pahkitew Island
- Wakanheja
- Wapos Bay
- Warrior Up!
- Wawatay Kids TV
- Wumpa's World
- Yvon of the Yukon

=== Sports programming ===
On March 24, 2019, APTN simulcast a Sportsnet-produced NHL game between the Montreal Canadiens and Carolina Hurricanes with commentary in Plains Cree, as part of the Rogers Hometown Hockey package. As a tie-in for the broadcast, Sportsnet also originated that week's Hometown Hockey on-location broadcast from Enoch Cree Nation 135 outside of Edmonton. On December 13, 2019, APTN and Rogers announced that they would broadcast six Hometown Hockey games per-season in the language over the next three years. After a hiatus, the broadcasts returned in 2022 during the 2021–22 NHL season, with most of the games now drawn from Hockey Night in Canada broadcasts. APTN began to add a package of Inuktitut broadcasts in 2025.

== Budget ==
In 2023, APTN had an annual budget of $47 million.

== Distribution ==
APTN's service previously consisted of four feeds: separate national cable feeds for Eastern (Ontario and east), Western Canada (Manitoba and west), and Northern Canada, as well as a national HD feed. The terrestrial feed, the successor to the original TVNC, was available over-the-air in Canada's far northern areas. It consisted of flagship station CHTY-TV in Yellowknife, Northwest Territories, semi-satellite CHWT-TV in Whitehorse, Yukon, and numerous low-powered rebroadcasters across the Northwest Territories, Yukon, Nunavut, Alberta, Quebec and Newfoundland and Labrador.

On August 31, 2011, APTN shut down 39 low-power television repeaters across the Northwest Territories and Yukon, representing nearly half of its over-the-air transmitters. Although this discontinuation was conducted on the same day as Canada's digital transition deadline in certain mandatory markets, these over-the-air transmitters were not subject to this deadline. None of the mandatory markets for digital transition were located the Northwest Territories or Yukon. APTN's 2013 CRTC licence renewal did not include any over-the-air transmitters.

In November 2016, CEO Jean La Rose told the Winnipeg Free Press that APTN was negotiating carriage for a U.S. service. He noted that there was a high level of interest among Native Americans for programming relevant to their communities.

Over-the-air repeaters of APTN (Alberta)
City of licence	Channel	Callsign	Notes
Chateh	13	CKCA-TV	

Over-the-air repeaters of APTN (Newfoundland and Labrador)
City of licence	Channel	Callsign	Notes
Goose Bay	12	CHTG-TV	Has application to convert to digital as CHTG-DT on VHF 7
Hopedale	12	CH4153	
Makkovik	12	CH4151	
Nain	12	CH4154	
Postville	12	CH4152	
Rigolet	12	CH4155	

Over-the-air repeaters of APTN (Northwest Territories)
City of licence	Channel	Callsign	Notes
Fort Good Hope	12	CH4200	
Fort McPherson	10	CH4205	
Fort Simpson	14	CH4202	
Fort Smith	10	CH4206	
Hay River	12	CH4160	
Inuvik	13	CH4221	
Norman Wells	12	CH4220	
Ulukhaktok	13	CH2553	
Yellowknife	11	CHTY	

Over-the-air repeaters of APTN (Nunavut)
City of licence	Channel	Callsign	Notes
Arctic Bay	11	CH4196	
Arviat	7	CH4158	
Baker Lake	12	CH4156	
Cambridge Bay	13	CH2550	
Chesterfield Inlet	6	CH4213	
Clyde River	6	CH4172	
Coral Harbour	4	CH4197	
Gjoa Haven	13	CH2552	
Hall Beach	12	CH4214	
Igloolik	12	CH4201	
Iqaluit	10	CH4161	
Kimmirut	6	CH4198	
Kinngait	12	CH4157	
Kugaaruk	13	CH2554	
Nanisivik	11	CH4178	
Pangnirtung	12	CH4162	
Pond Inlet	12	CH4163	
Rankin Inlet	12	CH4265	
Resolute	12	CH4208	
Sanikiluaq	12	CH4217	
Taloyoak	13	CH2555	
Whale Cove	10	CH4219	

Over-the-air repeaters of APTN (Quebec)
City of licence	Channel	Callsign	Notes
Akulivik	12	CH4189	
Aupaluk	11	CH4182	
Inukjuak	11	CH4191	
Ivujivik	11	CH4190	
Kangiqsualujjuaq	12	CH4183	
Kangiqsujuaq	12	CH4185	
Kangirsuk	12	CH4184	
Kuujjuaq	12	CH4195	
Kuujjuarapik	7	CH4194	
Povungnituk	7	CH4192	
Salluit	7	CH4193	
Tasiujaq	12	CH4187	
Umiujaq	6	CH4188	

Over-the-air repeaters of APTN (Yukon)
City of licence	Channel	Callsign	Notes
Dawson City	9	CH4261	
Upper Liard	11	CH4167	
Watson Lake	5	CH4169	
Whitehorse	11	CHWT	

The Eastern Canada cable feed operated as the national feed until the Western Canada feed began service on October 2, 2006.

== Advertising policy ==
APTN will avoid stereotypes and clichés when they choose advertisers.

== Former subsidiaries ==
APTN formed a number of subsidiary media companies which, in 2019, were spun off as a new company Dadan Sivunivut, "an arms-length, independent company with the responsibility to manage and expand the group of companies that had been established in the previous 12 years under the APTN umbrella".

=== First Peoples Radio ===
On June 14, 2017, a subsidiary of APTN, First Peoples Radio Inc. (FPR), was granted licences by the CRTC to operate radio stations in Toronto and Ottawa aimed at urban Indigenous populations in those cities. The Ottawa station will broadcast on 95.7 FM and the Toronto station will use 106.5 FM. Both frequencies had previously been allocated to Aboriginal Voices Radio which had its licences revoked in 2015. FPR had also applied for licences in Edmonton, Calgary, and Vancouver but the CRTC granted these to other applicants.

First Peoples Radio Inc had originally announced that its two radio stations, CFPT-FM in Toronto and CFPO-FM in Ottawa, were to go on the air by June 2018 but later delayed its soft launch until October 24, 2018. FPR will produce and share programming with the Missinipi Broadcasting Corporation in Saskatchewan and Native Communications Incorporated in Manitoba and is also in talks with the Aboriginal Multi-Media Society, which has been granted radio licences in Edmonton and Calgary, and Northern Native Broadcasting (Terrace), which operates an Indigenous radio station in Terrace, British Columbia, and has been granted a licence to operate a radio station in Vancouver, about potential programming partnerships.

The stations first went on the air on October 24, 2018 at noon, branded as Elmnt FM.

In 2019, ownership of First Peoples Radio was transferred to Dadan Sivunivut. On September 1, 2025, both stations shut down.

=== Expansion into the United States ===
APTN launched a similar outlet, All Nations Network, in the United States, which has been under the umbrella of Dadan Sivunivut since 2019. APTN had previously aired works produced in the United States, such as the full-length documentary film Skydancer, directed by Katja Esson, about the community of Akwesasne and its ironworkers. It was aired on both APTN and PBS in the United States in October 2012, after winning awards at film festivals.

== See also ==
- CBC North
- World Indigenous Television Broadcasters Network
- Aboriginal Canadian personalities
- Taiwan Indigenous Television
