= Janet Panic =

- Birth name: Janet Blythe Pruden
- Born: June 17, 1970 (age 55); Brockville, Ontario, Canada
- Genres: Folk, rock, pop folk
- Occupation(s): Singer-songwriter, musician, radio and tv producer, voice talent
- Instrument(s): Vocals, guitar, banjo, percussion
- Years active: 1994–present
- Website: janetpanic.net

Janet Panic (born June 17, 1970) is a Métis singer, guitarist, and songwriter. She has released a number of albums of original music as a member of the band Phew (1994–1995), 10 Ft. Henry (1996–1997) and under her own name. Panic is best known for the 10 Ft. Henry songs, "I Can't Get Enough", "Shove It" and "Fish" which received considerable Canadian college radio airplay and the song "Blink" from 2001's The Girl Who Passed for Normal, which has also received regular Canadian airplay. She has also been active in First Nations media, both as a producer and as a broadcast journalist.

== Early life ==
Janet was born to Dr. Barry Pruden, a chemical engineer, and Norma Pruden an early childhood educator. She has one sibling, a brother, Alexander Pruden.

The family followed the oil industry around Canada, moving 13 times over the course of her childhood. Janet left home at 17 finishing high school on her own in Calgary, Alberta. She attended Concordia University in Montreal, Quebec in 1988, majoring in Art History with a minor in Music. Discovering an interest in music, she switched her major to music and began to consider a career in music.

At Concordia Janet met Dragan Panic, a fellow musician, whom she would later marry and divorce. The couple moved to Vancouver, British Columbia together in 1992 where Janet took a job at Punch Lines Comedy Club and met Canadian comedian Brent Butt. From 2000 through 2002, together with Butt and Jamie Hutchinson, Janet operated a club called The Comedy Store. The club closed with Brent Butt's departure to work on Canadian sitcom, Corner Gas.

== As media producer ==
In 2005 Ms. Panic joined the crew of APTN television series Beyond Words, working as associate producer, interviewer and camera person and was featured in one of the episodes called Voices Pure And Simple.

In 2007 worked as associate producer on APTN program entitled MyTV, a First Nations youth music magazine.

In 2009 teamed up with (producer and guitarist) Stevie Salas and Brandon Friesen creating a new APTN series, Arbor Live, and she worked on that program for its first season, but left after the first season citing creative differences. Panic appeared as a featured performer on the second season.

In 2010 Janet Panic joined Aboriginal Voices Radio, a Canadian national radio network where she sits as a member of the board, acts as assistant music programmer and interviews significant members of the Canadian Aboriginal community for a weekly broadcast.

In 2018, following the replacement of the network, Panic joined First Peoples Radio's CFPT-FM in Toronto to host evenings.

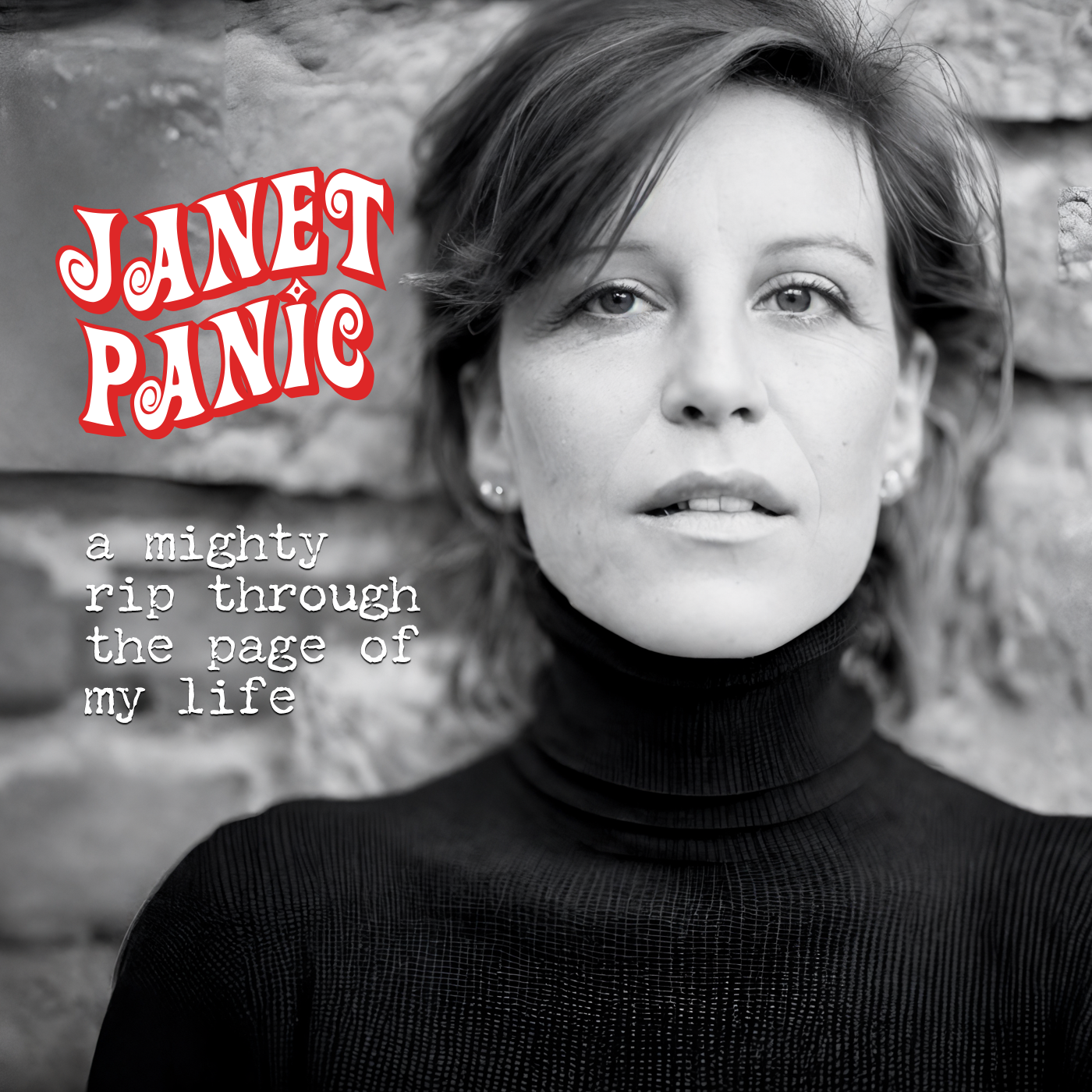
Album cover art from a mighty rip through the page of my life, Janet Panic

== As musician ==
From 1993 through 1995, Janet formed her first band called The Phew, with Dragan Panic, guitar, Martin White, bass, Aggie Richichi, drums, which drew comparisons to No Doubt. Phew released an EP called Phew and a full-length CD entitled Dramastically.

After the breakup of Phew, Janet and husband Dragan Panic formed a new band called 10 Ft. Henry, named after a famous punk music venue in Calgary. 10 Ft. Henry released one eponymous EP and one full-length CD entitled Oh Oh. The band achieved some popularity, placing several songs on Canadian College radio – "I Can't Get Enough", "Shove It" and "Fish", touring across Canada several times and shooting a video for the song "Fish" produced by Triton Films.

Janet and Dragan separated in 1998 and 10 Ft. Henry disbanded.

Janet released an EP of 6 songs entitled Little EP in 1998.

Over the summers of 2000 and 2001, Janet earned her living busking at Granville Island Public Market in Vancouver and began work on her next album, The Girl Who Passed for Normal, produced by John Shepp, Stephan Sigerson, Jeff Dawson, Daniel Powter and Shawn McKay.

One of the songs, I Miss My Sweet Embrace, co written by Comedian Richard Lett, was awarded a MuchFACT grant and a video was shot, directed by Neill Blomkamp.

Recorded an album with Arbor Records in 2008, produced by Canadian guitarist and producer Derek Miller, entitled Out on a Limb, which has not been released because the label shut down amid some controversy. A video for the song " Out On A limb" was produced by APTN's First Tracks and Big Soul Productions in June 2009.

On March 6, 2009, Janet performed at the 16th Annual National Aboriginal Achievement Awards, broadcast nationally in Canada on the Global Television Network and APTN.

In June 2010 Janet Panic appeared at The Dreaming Festival in Woodford on the Sunshine Coast of Australia along with Stevie Salas.

In August 2010 Janet appeared as the musical guest for episode 308 of Nehiyawetan, entitled Winter Solstice, which aired in 2011 on APTN.

On November 26, 2010, Janet performed at the Canadian Aboriginal Music Awards hosted in Hamilton Ontario and broadcast nationally on the Global Television Network.

On June 21, 2011, Janet Panic performed at the Comox Valley National Aboriginal Day celebrations.

Janet Panic was nominated in the category of Best Aboriginal Songwriter at the 2011 Canadian Folk Music Awards.

Panic's album Samples won Best Folk / Acoustic CD at the 2012 Aboriginal People's Choice Music Awards.

The Samples album was also nominated for a 2013 Juno Award in the Aboriginal Album of the Year category.

Beginning in 2010 Janet Panic became involved with autism awareness organization ANCA and has hosted and performed at their International Naturally Autistic People (INAP) Awards. She is now a spokesperson for the program and is scheduled to appear at the INAP Convention and Awards in October 2013.

On October 14 and 15, 2023, Janet Panic performed as part of the Covering Joni concerts at The Raven's Cry Theatre in Sechelt, BC.

In February 2024, Janet Panic released the album A Mighty Rip Through The Page of My Life. The album features Panic, her husband Will Mason on bass, Nashville drummer Craig Wright, among others. Songs were co-written with husband Will Mason, Panic's father, Barry Pruden, and her brother-in-law.

== Discography ==
Year	Album
1994	Phew
1995	Dramastically (album)
1996	10 Ft Henry
1997	Oh Oh (album)
1999	Little EP
2001	The Girl Who Passed for Normal (album)
2006	Acoustic demo
2009	Live
2010	Out on a Limb
2011	Samples (album)
2013	Most of What Follows is True (album)
2024	A Mighty Rip Through the Page of My Life" (album)
