= DWLV =

DWLV is the callsign of Bicol Broadcasting System's two stations in Naga, Camarines Sur:

- DWLV-AM
- DWLV-FM, branded as BBS FM
