= CFNR =

CFNR may refer to:

- CFNR-FM, a radio station (92.1 FM) licensed to Terrace, British Columbia, Canada
- California Northern Railroad (reporting mark CFNR)
- University of the Philippines Los Baños College of Forestry and Natural Resources
