= Oil on Ice =

- Theatrical release poster
- Directed by: Bo Boudart; Dale Djerassi
- Written by: Stephen Most
- Produced by: Bo Boudart; Dale Djerassi
- Narrated by: Peter Coyote
- Cinematography: Bo Boudart
- Edited by: Rhonda Collins
- Music by: William Susman
- Release date: May 31, 2004 (Telluride Mountainfilm)
- Running time: 60 min
- Country: United States
- Language: English

Oil on Ice is a 2004 documentary film directed by Bo Boudart and Dale Djerassi. It explores the Arctic Refuge drilling controversy in the Arctic National Wildlife Refuge (ANWR) and the impact of oil and gas development on the land, wildlife, and lives of the Gwich'in Athabascan Indians and Inupiat Eskimos.

== Cast ==
The film was narrated by Peter Coyote and features interviews with and footage of environmentalists Amory Lovins, Celia Hunter, Sarah James, Norma Kassi, former Alaska Governor Tony Knowles, former Alaska Senator Ted Stevens, California Senator Barbara Boxer, former Sierra Club director Carl Pope, Ken Whitten, David Klein, former Fairbanks North Star Borough Mayor Jim Whitaker, former North Slope Borough Mayor George N. Ahmaogak, and Inupiaq activist and former Nuiqsut mayor Rosemary Ahtuangaruak.

== Production ==
Oil on Ice was sponsored by Northern Alaska Environmental Center (NAEC) and was filmed on location in Alaska, San Francisco, and Washington, DC. To promote and market the film, Steve Michelson engaged fourteen non-profit organizations, including the Sierra Club, members of which hosted thousands of house parties to screen and distribute materials about the film, and to promote grassroots efforts to prevent ANWR drilling.

=== Release ===
The film premiered at Mountainfilm in Telluride on May 31, 2004, and was released on DVD on September 6, 2005. The soundtrack CD Oil on Ice by William Susman, featuring cellist Joan Jeanrenaud, was released on October 16, 2007.

== Reception ==
FilmCritic.com reviewer Eric Meyerson described the film as "unabashed counter-propaganda to the pro-drilling forces" seeking access to wilderness land. He credits its professional production and its "powerful story, with astonishing wildlife photography and fascinating and tragic tales of the plights of local fishermen and native tribes." Meyerson found the interviews with Gwich'in Indian Adeline Peter Raboff "particularly affecting." He noted that the film is "as one-sided as the O'Reilly Factor" in that it "failed to address any positive economic impacts that the oil industry has had on Alaskans." But he termed the film "well-made counter-propaganda. If anything, Oil on Ice is worth seeing just to see exactly what ExxonMobil and CononcoPhillips are getting ready to tear into."

Russell Engebretson, writing for DVDVerdict, wrote of its "beautiful Alaskan wildlife cinematography, including one truly stunning shot of a grazing Caribou herd that must have numbered in the thousands. For contrast, we get an aerial view of the massive, grotesque Prudhoe Bay drilling operation that abuts ANWR to the west." He noted that while the "wilderness scenery is delightful, there is ample interview material as well." Of the many interviewees, he found that two, Pope and Lovins, "drag down the film", and that Lovins "steers the film away from its central thesis — the exploitation of ANWR." Engebretson felt that the documentary erred in two ways: "by lionizing people who don't deserve such treatment", and "in presenting [John] Kerry as a foe of Big Oil". Summarizing, he found the film to be "a good, basic introduction (from an anti-drilling point-of-view) to the oil extraction debate."

== Awards ==
Oil on Ice received several awards: the 2004 International Documentary Association Pare Lorentz Award for best representing the "democratic sensibility, activist spirit and lyrical vision" of Pare Lorentz, the 2005 Missoula International Wildlife Film Festival Festival Prize, the 2005 Moondance International Film Festival Calypso Award for feature documentary and Seahorse Award for best film score, and the 2006 Park City Film Music Festival Gold Medal for Excellence in the category Documentary, Jury Choice: Best Impact of Music.

== See also ==
- Being Caribou
