= Luis Enrique Mercado =

Mexican politician and journalist (1952–2020)

- Born: 19 January 1952; Mexico City, Mexico
- Died: 28 December 2020 (aged 68); Mexico City, Mexico
- Occupation: Politician
- Political party: PAN

Luis Enrique Mercado Sánchez (19 January 1952 – 28 December 2020) was a Mexican journalist and politician from the National Action Party.

== Biography ==
Mercado began his career in journalism in El Universal and founded in 1988 El Economista.

He later started Zacatecas radio station XHGPE-FM 96.1 "La Voz".

From 2009 to 2012, he served as Deputy of the LXI Legislature of the Mexican Congress representing Zacatecas.

Mercado died from COVID-19 on 28 December 2020, at the age of 68.
