= Native New Yorker =

Native New Yorker may refer to:

- A person who was born in or spent their formative years in New York state
- Native New Yorker (film)
- "Native New Yorker" (song)
