= Pow Wow Chow =

Pow Wow Chow may refer to:

- Pow Wow Chow, a 1984 Native American cookbook
- Pow Wow Chow, a Canadian television series which premiered in 2024.
