= Anash and the Legacy of the Sun-Rock =

- Created by: Carol Geddes
- Starring: Jess Arfi; Colin Van Loon
- Composer: Donovan Reimer
- Country of origin: Canada

Production
- Executive producer: Josh Miller
- Producer: Carol Geddes
- Cinematography: John Spooner
- Editor: Doug Forbes
- Production companies: Panacea Entertainment; Sun Rock Productions

Original release
- Network: Aboriginal Peoples Television Network
- Release: 2007

Anash and the Legacy of the Sun-Rock is a half-hour children's show produced by Panacea Entertainment for the Aboriginal Peoples Television Network, an aboriginal television network in Canada. It was part of the APTN Kids lineup. A mid-1800s, animated children's show based on Tlingit cultural stories about maintaining principles.

== Cast ==
- Jess Arfi as Anash, an orphan and warrior on a quest to reunite the separated parts of the mythical Sun-Rock
- Colin Van Loon as Kole, his servant and adopted brother.

== Streaming ==
As of October 2019 the series has been released online on the Canada Media Fund's Encore+ YouTube channel.
