= William Susman =

American composer and pianist

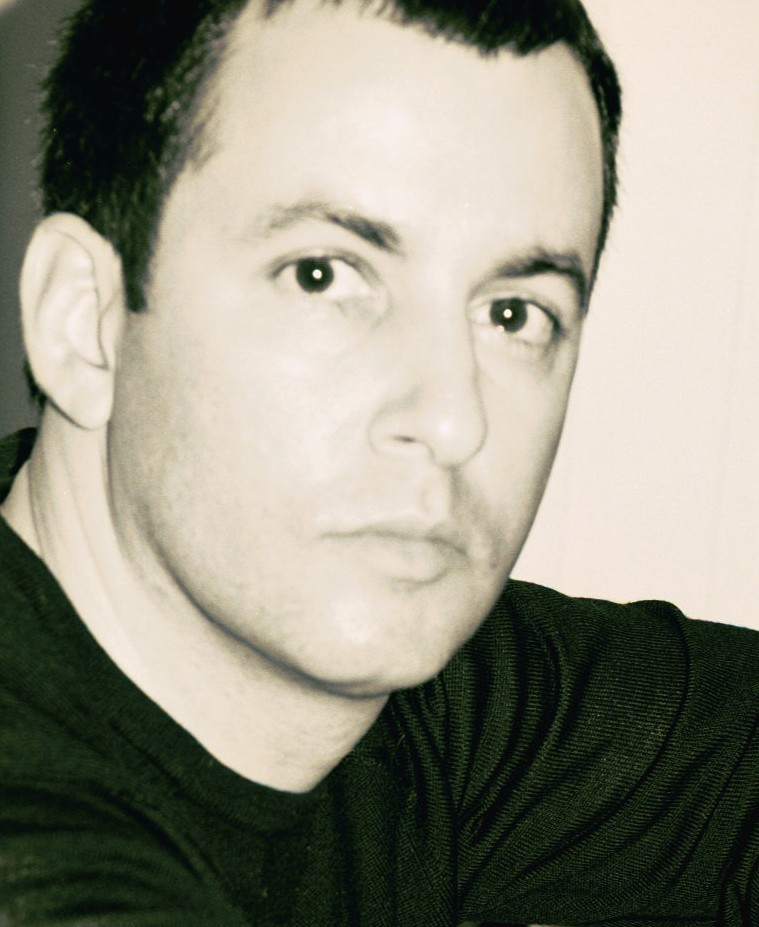
- Born: William Joseph Susman; August 29, 1960 (age 66); Chicago, United States
- Education: University of Illinois; Stanford University
- Occupations: Composer, pianist, film producer
- Years active: 1983–present
- Website: www.susmanmusic.com

William Joseph Susman (born August 29, 1960) is an American composer of concert and film music and a pianist. He has written orchestral and chamber music as well as documentary film scores.

== Music ==
Susman's music blends isorhythm and hocketing with montuño and clave rhythms in a fusion that combines both the complexity of Western classical tradition and the syncopation and polyrhythms of Afro-Cuban music. In addition to performances of his music in the U.S. and Europe, his compositions have been broadcast, for example his piano concerto on WQXR, in New Sounds on WNYC, Echoes on NPR and Concertzender.

He founded the record label Belarca Records to distribute his material and the work of other living composers.

== Influences ==
Susman's earliest orchestral works were influenced by Iannis Xenakis and György Ligeti. He is interested in algorithmic composition, following his composition teacher Herbert Brun at the University of Illinois and John Chowning at The Center For Computer Research in Music and Acoustics at Stanford University. His microtonal compositions were influenced by Ben Johnston. He also studied piano with Pauline Lindsey (a student of Artur Schnabel), Steve Behr (pianist with Louis Armstrong) and Alan Swain.

== Awards ==
- ASCAP Foundation Young Composer Award for Trailing Vortices
- ASCAP Foundation Raymond Hubbell Award for Movement for Orchestra
- BMI Student Composer Award for Pentateuch
- Fromm Music Foundation at Harvard for Trailing Vortices
- Gaudeamus International Musicweek for Trailing Vortices
- International Documentary Association Pare Lorenz Award, for Oil on Ice
- KUCYNA/ALEA III International Composers Competition for Twisted Figures
- Percussive Arts Society for Exchanges

== Works ==
Orchestra

- In A State of Patterns (2018)
- Piano Concerto (2011)
- Snow Lion of Peace (2009)
- Zydeco Madness: To the Forgotten of Hurricane Katrina (2006)
- Angels of Light (1991)
- Uprising (1989)
- Trailing Vortices (1986)
- Pentateuch (1984)
- Openings (1982)
- Movement for Orchestra (1980)

Chamber ensemble

- The Heavens Above for Two Brass Quintets (2023)
- Seven Scenes for Four Flutes (2011)
- Camille (2010)
- Clouds and Flames (2010)
- Native New Yorker (2005)
- Three Different Keyboards (2001)
- The Starry Dynamo (1994)
- Exposé (1989)
- Twisted Figures (1987)
- Streamlines (1984)
- For Three Trombones (1983)

Wind quintet

- Six Minutes Thirty Seconds (1995)

Brass quintet

- The Heavens Above (1998)

Vocal/Choral

- Facing a New Normal (2022)
- Salaam Alaykum, Shalom Alaychem (2011) SATB
- Eternal Light (2010) SATB
- Scatter My Ashes (2009)
- Living These Seasons (2009) SATB & piano
- Moving in to an Empty Space (1992)
- Interlude (1984)
- Two Songs (1983)
- Elie (1983) SATB
- Three Songs (1981)

Percussion

- Haskalah for marimba and organ (2017)
- Material Rhythms for percussion quartet (2010)
- Amores Montuños for flute & marimba (2008)
- Marimba Montuño for marimba (2002)
- Floating Falling for cello and timpani (1987)
- Exchanges for percussion soloist and winds (1982)

String quartet

- String Quartet No. 6: Isolation Songs (2020)
- String Quartet No. 5: Dancing on Air (2013)
- String Quartet No. 4: Zydeco Madness (2006)
- String Quartet No. 3: Patterns of Change (1997)
- String Quartet No. 2: Up to the Sky (1988)
- String Quartet No. 1: Streams (1984)

Piano Trio

- Clouds and Flames (2010)

Piano

- Loud Harmonies - Book I (2024) A set of 22 piano pieces
- Quiet Rhythms - Book IV (2013) A set of 22 piano pieces
- Quiet Rhythms - Book III (2012) A set of 22 piano pieces
- Quiet Rhythms - Book II (2010) A set of 22 piano pieces
- Quiet Rhythms - Book I (2010) A set of 22 piano pieces
- Piano Montuño (2004)
- Uprising (1988)

Solo and duo

- Zydeco Madness for accordion (2005)
- Duo Montuño for clarinet & piano (2004)
- Duo Montuño for alto sax & piano (2004)
- Duo Montuño for viola and piano (2004)
- Motions of Return for flute & piano (1996)
- For Cello (1984)
- Halilah for viola (1983)
- Nnyl for trombone (1983)
- Turbulence for flute (1983)
- Violin Study (1983)

Electronic

- Waves for piano and computer-generated sound (version with notated piano part) (1982)
- Waves for Any number of improvisers and computer-generated sound (1982)

Film music

- Game Day (2017)
- People of the Graphic Novel (2012)
- Joann Sfar Draws from Memory (2012)
- When Medicine Got It Wrong (2009)
- Balancing Acts: A Jewish Theater in the Soviet Union (2008)
- Making the Man (2007)
- Fate of the Lhapa (2007)
- Native New Yorker (2005)
- Oil on Ice (2004)
- Asphyxiating Uma (2002)
- Deep Under the Ice (2000) aka NASA Explores Under the Ice
- Daydream Believer (1998)
- Alaska's Arctic Wildlife (1997)
- Indonesia (1996)
- The Philippines (1996)
- Southern Africa Safari (1995)
- Discovering the Amazon and the Andes (1994)
- The Elephant Seals of Ano Nuevo (1994)
- Exploring Tropical Australia (1993)
