= XHSIC-FM =

Radio station in Córdoba, Veracruz, Mexico

- Córdoba, Veracruz; Mexico
- Frequency: 96.1 FM
- Branding: La Bestia Grupera

Programming
- Format: Regional Mexican

Ownership
- Owner: Grupo Radiorama; (XHSIC, S.A. de C.V.)
- Operator: Grupo Audiorama Comunicaciones

History
- First air date: November 21, 1988 (concession)

Technical information
- ERP: 25 kW
- HAAT: -59.7 m
- Transmitter coordinates: 18°53′47″N 96°56′17″W

Links
- Webcast: Listen live
- Website: www.radiorama.mx/aradios.php?id=249

XHSIC-FM is a radio station on 96.1 FM in Córdoba, Veracruz. It is owned by Grupo Radiorama, although it is originally operated by Grupo Audiorama Comunicaciones and carries its Regional Mexican format known as La Bestia Grupera.

== History ==
XESIC-AM received its concession on November 21, 1988. It was owned by Marco Aurelio Moncada Krauss and broadcast with 1,000 watts on 670 kHz. Moncada Krauss had been fighting for a station for years, placing a bid on what had been designated "XERFC" on 1410 kHz in 1973. It soon was operated by Grupo ACIR under the names Radio Festival, Radio ACIR, and Radio Felicidad.

Grupo Radiorama assumed control and ownership of many ACIR stations in July 2009. The station was originally known as Romántica 670 and then Vox 67.

XESIC migrated to FM in 2010 and renamed itself Tu Recuerdo in 2012. In 2015, it switched to the current La Bestia Grupera brand.
