= XHPLPM-FM =

Radio station in La Piedad, Michoacán, Mexico

- La Piedad, Michoacán; Mexico
- Frequency: 96.1 FM
- Branding: El Kuino FM

Programming
- Format: Regional Mexican

Ownership
- Owner: Grupo Radiofónico ZER; (Rodrigo Rodríguez Reyes)

History
- First air date: December 2019
- Call sign meaning: La Piedad Michoacán

Technical information
- Class: A
- ERP: 3 kW
- HAAT: 64.9 meters
- Transmitter coordinates: 20°21′29″N 102°02′04″W

Links
- Webcast: Listen live
- Website: grupozer.mx

XHPLPM-FM is a radio station on 96.1 FM in La Piedad, Michoacán. It is owned by Grupo Radiofónico ZER and known as El Kuino FM, carrying a Regional Mexican format.

== History ==
XHPLPM was awarded in the IFT-4 radio auction of 2017. The initial winning bidder, Tecnoradio, paid $15.5 million pesos for the frequency, but was later disqualified nationwide. Rodrigo Rodríguez Reyes, the third-place bidder, had signed up to be eligible to win stations if other bidders were disqualified and came away with the La Piedad station for $9.5 million pesos. The station officially came to air in December 2019.
