= El Economista (Mexico) =

Mexican newspaper

- Type: Daily newspaper
- Founded: 1989; 37 years ago
- Language: Spanish
- Website: www.eleconomista.com.mx

El Economista is a Mexican business and economics newspaper. Founded in 1988, it publishes from Monday to Friday in five columns. One of its most distinctive features is the unusual tone of pink-orange paper it is printed on.

It was founded in Mexico City on December 5, 1988, by journalists Luis Enrique Mercado and Martín Casillas de Alba. Mercado, a specialist in economic journalism who had previously worked at El Universal, served as the newspaper's general director from its founding until 2008. Casillas de Alba, an engineer and editor who had created his own publishing house and the cultural magazine La Plaza, acted as editorial director from 1988 to 1994, overseeing the newspaper's cultural coverage.

== Contents ==
Recently, El Economista has tried to renew itself. It now includes several add-ins such as monthly or weekly supplements covering important business and personal finance issues like: Mutual Funds, Real Estate, Entrepreneurship, Health, Fashion, Construction and Transport.

From Monday to Friday the newspaper prints an Editorial Column, From Europe, a digest of The New York Times, La Plaza (sports, showbiz and cultural section), the usual Market Information, a Personal Finance section, Small Businesses, a Column by an academic of respected business schools (ITAM, ITESM, IPADE, Universidad Anáhuac, and so on) Finance, Economics, National Politics and Local Politics. Finally, the editorial page.

Some of the editorialists include Ricardo Medina, Maricarmen Cortés, Luis Mercado and Isaac Katz.

== See also ==
- List of newspapers in Mexico
