= XHEOH-FM =

Radio station in Ciudad Camargo, Chihuahua

- Camargo, Chihuahua; Mexico
- Frequency: 96.1 FM
- Branding: La Jefa

Programming
- Format: Grupera

Ownership
- Owner: Salayandia García family; (Radio XEOH-AM de Camargo, S.A. de C.V.)

History
- First air date: March 25, 1976 (concession)

Technical information
- Licensing authority: CRT
- Class: B1
- ERP: 25 kW
- HAAT: 6.9 m (23 ft)
- Transmitter coordinates: 27°39′50″N 105°11′14″W

Links
- Webcast: Listen live
- Website: lajefaradiocamargo.com.mx

XHEOH-FM is a radio station on 96.1 FM in Camargo, Chihuahua, Mexico. The station is owned by 10 members of the Salayandia García family and carries a grupera format known as La Jefa.

== History ==
XHEOH began as XEOH-AM 1270, receiving its concession on March 25, 1976. It was owned by Belém Arriaga Muro. By the 1990s, XEOH had moved to 750 kHz.

It migrated to FM in 2011.
