= Tiga Talk =

- Logo
- Created by: Irene Green, Hilary Pryor
- Starring: Irene Green; Art Napoleon; Kate-La Faith Hanuse; Gabriel Paul; Shauntelle Dick-Charleson; Isaac Elijah; Kyra Heberlein; Calvin Cooke; Brian Culp (puppeteer); Ingrid Hansen (puppeteer); Steve Barker (puppeteer); Rob Hunter (puppeteer)
- Opening theme: Composed by Ry Moran
- Country of origin: Canada
- No. of seasons: 4
- No. of episodes: 43 (list of episodes)

Production
- Executive producers: Irene Green; Hilary Pryor
- Producers: Irene Green; Hilary Pryor
- Running time: 30 minutes

Original release
- Network: APTN
- Release: November 19, 2008

Tiga Talk! is a Canadian children's television series featuring a wolf cub puppet called Tiga. Produced for the Aboriginal Peoples Television Network in Canada, the show uses puppets and live-action stories to explore First Nations culture.

== Cast ==
- Irene Green as Kokum
- Art Napoleon as Dad
- Kate-La Faith Hanuse as Jodie
- Michaela Fraser as Kimmie
- Gabriel Paul as Jason
- Shauntelle Dick-Charleson as Alice
- Isaac Elijah as Jack
- Kyra Heberlein as Tessa
- Calvin Cooke as Kyle

=== Puppeteers ===
- Brian Culp - Tiga the Wolf
- Ingrid Hansen - Gertie the Gopher
- Steve Barker operates Gavin the Canada Goose
- Rob Hunter

=== Location ===
Tiga Talk was filmed at various locations, including the city of Victoria, Little Raven pre-school, Kuper Island First Nations and Nitinat Lake.

== Episodes ==
There are four seasons of Tiga Talk!: six episodes in 2008, thirteen episodes in 2009, thirteen episodes in 2010, and eleven episodes in 2011.

=== Season 1: (2008) ===
1. Shh is For Sharing
2. Fuh is For Friends
3. SSS is For Smiling
4. Guh is For Growing
5. LLL is For Listening
6. CCC is For Caring

=== Season 2: (2009) ===
1. Dreams
2. Birthdays
3. Keep Trying
4. Dwellings
5. Dance
6. Safety
7. Food
8. Food Preparation
9. Exercise
10. Spring
11. Summer
12. Fall
13. Winter

=== Season 3: (2010) ===
1. Building
2. Appreciate the World We See
3. Listen to the World
4. Remembering the Past
5. Keep Smiling
6. Competition
7. Dressing Up
8. Making Music
9. Trees
10. Babies
11. Treasures
12. Giving Gifts
13. Camping

=== Season 4: (2011) ===
1. Laughter
2. Hands and Feet
3. Tiga and Hiccups
4. Moving
5. Do It On My Own
6. I Feel Left Out
7. Where Is It?
8. I Want A Pet
9. What Shall I Wear
10. Who's That?
11. Cook Out!
