= Being Caribou =

- Directed by: Leanne Allison; Diana Wilson
- Written by: Leanne Allison; Diana Wilson
- Produced by: Tracey Friesen
- Starring: Leanne Allison; Karsten Heuer
- Edited by: Janice Brown
- Music by: Dennis Burke
- Distributed by: National Film Board of Canada
- Release date: June 2, 2005
- Running time: 72 minutes
- Country: Canada
- Language: English

Being Caribou is a 2005 documentary film that chronicles the travels of husband and wife Karsten Heuer and Leanne Allison following the migration of the Porcupine caribou herd, in order to explore the Arctic Refuge drilling controversy. The journey lasted 5 months, starting from the community of Old Crow, Yukon on April 8, 2003 and ending on September 8, 2003. The film is produced by the National Film Board of Canada.

Karsten Heuer documented this trek with Leanne Allison, which was also their honeymoon, in his book Being Caribou: Five Months on Foot with an Arctic Herd. The book was published in 2005.

== Plot ==
Allison, an environmentalist, and Heuer, a wildlife biologist, follow a herd of 120,000 caribou on foot, across 1,500 kilometres (900 Miles) of Arctic tundra, in order to raise awareness of threats to the caribou's survival. At stake is the herd's delicate habitat, which is threatened by proposed petroleum and natural gas development in the herd's calving grounds in Alaska's Arctic National Wildlife Refuge.

== Awards ==
Winner of approximately 20 awards and honours, including a Gemini Award and Most Popular Canadian Film at the Vancouver International Film Festival.

== See also ==
- Oil on Ice
