= Chic Choc ! =

Canadian French-language teen television series

Chic Choc ! was a Canadian French-language television magazine for First Nations teenagers in Quebec, broadcast on the Aboriginal Peoples Television Network (APTN) from 2007 to 2010 and made up of 39 episodes of about 22 minutes. It was hosted by singer and musician Christian Laveau and singer and actress Mélanie Napartuk, who is from Nunavik. The show shown the teenage life of young Aboriginal teenagers of Quebec, by going through interviews, testimonials and short biographies.

In 2008, the Academy of Canadian Cinema and Television awarded Chic Choc the Prix du Multiculturalisme at the 23rd Prix Gémeaux. However, original producer Attraction Images (then called Cirrus Communications), who first created the show along with TV producer Léa Pascal (they formed Nikan Productions to manage the rights), lost interest to do a second season, causing the show to go on hiatus. But a year later, Christian Laveau, one of the two hosts, decided to self-produce the show through his Wendake, Quebec-based company, Andawa Productions, according to his own résumé and thus, retrieved the rights from Attraction Images in order to do so. The now redesigned show returned on the-air in 2009 and was renewed a second year in 2010, this time with co-executive producer Joanne Couture. The show then ended permanently, but the show website (www.chicchoc.tv) remained active. After Chic Choc ended, Laveau remained active in television production through Andawa Productions and produced a TV documentary series named La Vie est Hockey (Life Is Hockey), still for APTN, which aired in 2013. Also in 2013, he recorded an album of original Aboriginal-language songs called Sondawka with the help of musician-producer Gilles Sioui.

== Format and content ==
The series was aimed at First Nations teenagers aged 13 to 17 who spoke on camera about life, their future, what motivated them and what they wanted to change. Each episode was built around a theme such as love, health, solidarity, humour or tradition, using testimonials, sport and community challenges, vox pops and music videos. At its launch La Tribune reported that topics ranged from homosexuality and entrepreneurship to comics and tradition.
