= Rez Bluez =

Rez Bluez is a show which showcases the best of the best in Aboriginal Blues talent. First produced for the Aboriginal Peoples Television Network, an aboriginal television network in Canada. Rez Bluez won the 2008 Best Television Program/Promotion of Aboriginal Music award from Aboriginal Peoples Choice Music Awards.
