= Bizou (TV series) =

Canadian children's television series

Bizou is a 2007 Canadian animated preschool television series. It teaches children about animals and Aboriginal life through the eyes of an Aboriginal princess named Bizou. Bizou is produced by Jerry Co Animation and 9 Story Entertainment and distributed by Picture Box Distribution. It is shown on Aboriginal Peoples Television Network (aptn) in Canada and First Nations Experience (FNX) in the United States.

== Episodes ==
#	Title
1	"Bizou and the Black Bear"
2	"Bizou and the Turtle"
3	"Bizou and the Moose"
4	"Bizou and the Owl"
5	"Bizou and the Rabbit"
6	"Bizou and the Coyote"
7	"Bizou and the Raven"
8	"Bizou and the Hermit Thrush"
9	"Bizou and the Seal"
10	"Bizou and the Wolf"
11	"Bizou and the Porcupine"
12	"Bizou and the Raccoon"
13	"Bizou and the Beaver"
14	"Bizou and the Polar Bear"
15	"Bizou and the Bullfrog"
16	"Bizou and the Salmon"
17	"Bizou and the Grouse"
18	"Bizou and the Red Fox"
19	"Bizou and the Bald Eagle"
20	"Bizou and the Killer Whale"
21	"Bizou and the Skunk"
22	"Bizou and the Deer"
23	"Bizou and the Chipmunk"
24	"Bizou and the Duck"
25	"Bizou and the Wolverine"
26	"Bizou and the Weasel"
27	"Bizou and the Groundhog"
28	"Bizou and the Muskrat"
29	"Bizou and the Crow"
30	"Bizou and the Canada Goose"
31	"Bizou and the Otter"
32	"Bizou and the Red-Tailed Hawk"
33	"Bizou and the Trout"
34	"Bizou and the Caribou"
35	"Bizou and the Horse"
36	"Bizou and the Mole"
