= XHPSJL-FM =

Radio station in San Juan de los Lagos, Jalisco

- San Juan de los Lagos, Jalisco; Mexico
- Frequency: 96.1 FM
- Branding: San Juan FM

Programming
- Format: Regional Mexican

Ownership
- Owner: Grupo Radiofónico ZER; (Arnoldo Rodríguez Zermeño)

History
- First air date: April 2019
- Call sign meaning: San Juan de los Lagos

Technical information
- Licensing authority: CRT
- Class: A
- ERP: 1.5 kW
- HAAT: −9.1 m (−30 ft)
- Transmitter coordinates: 21°15′03.4″N 102°19′52.7″W

XHPSJL-FM is a radio station on 96.1 FM in San Juan de los Lagos, Jalisco. It is owned by Grupo Radiofónico ZER and carries a Regional Mexican format known as San Juan FM.

== History ==
XHPSJL was awarded in the IFT-4 radio auction of 2017. The initial winning bidder, Tecnoradio, paid $12.5 million pesos for the frequency, but was later disqualified nationwide. Arnoldo Rodríguez Zermeño, the third-place bidder, had signed up to be eligible to win stations if other bidders were disqualified and came away with the San Juan de los Lagos station for $3.1 million pesos. The station officially came to air in April 2019 as the second commercial radio station for San Juan de los Lagos.
