= DWLV-AM =

Radio station in Naga, Camarines Sur, Philippines

DWLV
- Naga; Philippines
- Broadcast area: Camarines Sur and surrounding areas
- Frequency: 603 kHz
- Branding: DWLV 603

Programming
- Languages: Bicolano, Filipino
- Format: News, Public Affairs, Talk

Ownership
- Owner: Bicol Broadcasting System
- Sister stations: 91.9 BBS FM; 96.5 Radyo Kafuerte

Technical information
- Licensing authority: NTC
- Class: C/D/E
- Power: 10,000 watts

DWLV (603 AM) is a radio station owned and operated by Bicol Broadcasting System. The station's studio and transmitter are located at the BBS Bldg., Balatas Rd., Brgy. Balatas, Naga, Camarines Sur.
