= XHECS-FM =

Radio station in Manzanillo, Colima

- Manzanillo, Colima; Mexico
- Frequency: 96.1 FM
- Branding: La Mejor

Programming
- Format: Regional Mexican
- Affiliations: MVS Radio

Ownership
- Owner: Radio Manzanillo, S.A. de C.V.

History
- First air date: September 9, 1953

Technical information
- ERP: 25 kW
- Transmitter coordinates: 19°05′14.5″N 104°18′00″W

Links
- Website: lamejor.com.mx/manzanillo

XHECS-FM is a radio station on 96.1 FM in Manzanillo, Colima. The station is owned by Radio Manzanillo and affiliated to MVS Radio, and carries a Regional Mexican format known as La Mejor.

== History ==
On March 7, 1952, Julio Romo Valdivia applied for and received a new AM radio station in Manzanillo on 1400 kHz, XECS-AM. XECS signed on September 9, 1953, though on 1520 kHz, broadcasting with 200 watts using surplus World War II equipment. "Radio Manzanillo" was the first station in town. In 1957, XECS was moved to 960 kHz, broadcasting with 1,000 watts and began operating at night. The concession was transferred to Radio Manzanillo in 1985. Another power increase to 5,000 watts, accompanied by one final frequency change to 690 kHz, took place in the early 1990s.

XECS migrated to FM in 2011 as XHECS-FM 96.1. The XHECS callsign had previously belonged to a station located in Encinillas, Chihuahua, that changed its calls to XHCHI-FM in the late 2000s.
