= KZRC =

- Bennington, Oklahoma; United States
- Broadcast area: Durant, Oklahoma
- Frequency: 96.1 MHz
- Branding: Mix 96

Programming
- Format: Hot adult contemporary
- Affiliations: Premiere Networks; United Stations Radio Networks

Ownership
- Owner: Robert Sullins; (Keystone Broadcasting Corporation)

History
- First air date: 2013

Technical information
- Licensing authority: FCC
- Facility ID: 6348
- Class: A
- ERP: 6,000 watts
- HAAT: 100 meters (330 ft)
- Transmitter coordinates: 33°53′22.2″N 96°09′08.6″W
- Translator: 104.1 K281DH (Durant)

Links
- Public license information: Public file; LMS
- Webcast: Listen live
- Website: mix961.net

KZRC (96.1 FM) is a radio station licensed to Bennington, Oklahoma. The station broadcasts a hot adult contemporary format and is owned by Robert Sullins, through licensee Keystone Broadcasting Corporation.
