= CFPT-FM =

Indigenous radio station in Toronto, Canada

Coordinates: 43°38′56.04″N 79°22′54.12″W

- Toronto, Ontario; Canada
- Broadcast area: Greater Toronto Area
- Frequency: 106.5 MHz (HD Radio)
- Branding: 106.5 Elmnt FM

Programming
- Format: Indigenous Peoples' radio (Talk, Pop, Rock and R&B)

Ownership
- Owner: First Peoples Radio
- Sister stations: CFPO-FM

History
- First air date: October 24, 2018
- Last air date: September 1, 2025
- Call sign meaning: First Peoples Toronto

Technical information
- Class: B1
- ERP: 988 watts (average); 2,600 watts (peak)
- HAAT: 297.7 meters (977 ft)

Links
- Website: Archived official website

CFPT-FM (106.5 MHz, 106.5 Elmnt FM) was an Indigenous radio station in Toronto, Ontario. Owned by First Peoples Radio, a subsidiary of Dadan Sivunivut, it broadcast music and talk programming targeting the First Nations community, with the former focusing upon both contemporary and indigenous musicians. The station launched on October 24, 2018 as a replacement for the city's Voices Radio station. It ceased operations on September 1, 2025.

== History ==
In June 2017, the Canadian Radio-television and Telecommunications Commission (CRTC) awarded licences for five new Indigenous radio stations in Calgary, Edmonton, Ottawa, Vancouver, and Toronto to replace the Voices Radio network (whose licenses were revoked in 2015 due to long-term compliance issues). The Ottawa (CFPO-FM) and Toronto licences were awarded to First Peoples Radio, a subsidiary of APTN, with the Toronto station inheriting Voices Radio's 106.5 FM frequency.

In June 2018, it was announced that the two First Peoples Radio stations would brand as Elmnt FM, and air a mixture of music and talk programming, including popular pop, rock, and R&B music. At least 25% of the music played by the station will be by indigenous Canadian musicians. Métis musician Janet Panic was announced as the Toronto station's evening host.. Mohawk musician Julian Taylor was hired in May 2018 as the host of The Cruise and then the Afternoon Drive Show.

The station officially launched on October 24, 2018 as CFPT-FM.

In January 2022, broadcasters Mark Strong and Jemeni joined the station as cohosts of its morning show.

In May 2024, the CRTC rejected an application by First Peoples Radio requesting that $2 million in tangible benefits funding being paid by Stingray Group be redirected for two years to support CFPT-FM Toronto and its Ottawa sister station CFPO-FM. FPR chairman Jean LaRose said the application was a last ditch effort to keep the stations operational due to the impact the COVID-19 pandemic has on advertising revenue. Staff at the stations had been cut from 26 to 6 leaving no on-air personalities. As a result of the CRTC decision "we have to see just how far we can go and decide whether we have to close in the coming months if we’re not seeing growth in advertising revenue,” said LaRose.

On August 30, 2025, First Peoples Radio announced that it would be ceasing operations, resulting in the shutdown of both CFPT-FM and Ottawa 's sister station, CFPO-FM, on September 1, 2025 at 12am.

The CRTC officially revoked CFPT-FM's license on October 2, 2025.

On February 18, 2026, the CRTC issued call applications for new Indigenous radio stations to serve Ottawa (95.7 MHz) and Toronto (106.5 MHz).
