= CFNR-FM =

First Nations radio station in British Columbia, Canada

Terrace, British Columbia; Canada
- Broadcast area: Central and Northern British Columbia
- Frequency: 92.1 MHz
- Branding: CFNR Network, Classic Rock

Programming
- Format: Classic rock music, First Nations-oriented news, sports and cultural programming

Ownership
- Owner: Northern Native Broadcasting (Terrace)

History
- Call sign meaning: Canada's First Nations Radio

Technical information
- Class: B
- ERP: 180 watts (peak); 43 watts (average)
- HAAT: 446 metres (1,463 ft)
- Transmitter coordinates: 54.5178°N 128.473°W
- Repeaters: (see article)

Links
- Website: cfnrfm.ca

CFNR-FM is a Canadian radio station based in Terrace, British Columbia, owned and operated by Northern Native Broadcasting (Terrace). The station operates at 92.1 FM from the station headquarters in Terrace. The programming reflects and is broadcast to over 70 First Nations communities in northern and central British Columbia and has an audience of over 150,000 listeners. Programming of CFNR-FM is distributed to numerous repeater stations in the region.

The station describes its music programming as classic rock format. Programming includes cultural events such as the Hobiyee celebrations in Vancouver and Nisga'a territory, National Indigenous Peoples Day, and cultural sports broadcasts such as the annual All-Native Tournament and the Junior all Native Basketball Tournaments.

== History ==
CFNR received approval on July 20, 1992, Northern Native Broadcasting was granted a licence for an English-language and Native-language station at Terrace. The same year, CFNR received approval to operate a number of transmitters in northern British Columbia. In 1993, CFNR received approval to add more transmitters. In 1994, CFNR received approval to add a transmitter at Terrace.

On June 14, 2017, the CRTC granted CFNR's owner, Northern Native Broadcasting (Terrace), a license to operate a station in Vancouver at 106.3 MHz FM to serve the urban Indigenous population in that city. The frequency was previously licensed to Aboriginal Voices Radio Network which had its license revoked in 2015 for non-compliance issues. The station's call letters will be CJNY-FM.

== Locations ==
Communities in which CFNR-FM is broadcast, with their FM frequencies (in MHz) and call sign (where known):

Rebroadcasters of CFNR-FM
City of licence	Identifier	Frequency	Power	Class	RECNet	CRTC Decision
Alexandria	VF2173	97.1 FM	8 watts	VLP	Query	
Alkali Lake	VF2272	96.1 FM	39 watts	LP	Query	
Atlin	VF2133	96.1 FM	8 watts	VLP	Query	
Bella Bella	VF2232	97.1 FM	10 watts	VLP	Query	
Bella Coola	VF2233	96.1 FM	10 watts	VLP	Query	
Blueberry River	VF2110	96.1 FM	8 watts	VLP	Query	
Decker Lake	VF2236	97.1 FM	10 watts	VLP	Query	
Burns Lake	VF2111	96.1 FM	16 watts	LP	Query	
Fort Nelson	CFNR-FM-2	96.1 FM	8 watts	VLP	Query	
Canyon City	VF2226	98.1 FM	10 watts	VLP	Query	
Cheslatta	VF2230	95.1 FM	10 watts	VLP	Query	
Dease Lake	VF2066	97.1 FM	2 watts	VLP	Query	
Dog Creek	VF2276	96.1 FM	8 watts	VLP	Query	
Doig River	VF2112	96.1 FM	8 watts	VLP	Query	
Fort Babine	VF2231	98.1 FM	6 watts	VLP	Query	
Fort Ware	VF2113	96.1 FM	8 watts	VLP	Query	
Gitanyow (formerly Kitwancool)	VF2118	96.1 FM	8 watts	VLP	Query	
Kitseguecla	VF2135	97.1 FM	8 watts	VLP	Query	
Good Hope Lake	VF2072	96.1 FM	2 watts	VLP	Query	
Halfway River	VF2162	96.1 FM	8 watts	VLP	Query	
Hartley Bay	CFNR-FM-5	96.1 FM	8 watts	VLP	Query	Under Consideration
Hazelton	VF2163	98.1 FM	26 watts	LP	Query	
Iskut	VF2114	96.1 FM	8 watts	VLP	Query	
Kincolith	VF2115	96.1 FM	8 watts	VLP	Query	
Kitwanga	VF2165	98.1 FM	8 watts	VLP	Query	
Kitamaat Village	VF2116	96.1 FM	8 watts	VLP	Query	
Kitkatla	VF2117	98.1 FM	8 watts	VLP	Query	
Klemtu	VF2227	96.1 FM	10 watts	VLP	Query	
Laxgalts'ap	CFNR-FM-4	96.1 FM	8 watts	VLP	Query	
Lower Post	VF2078	96.1 FM	8 watts	VLP	Query	
Masset	VF2079	96.1 FM	2 watts	VLP	Query	
McLeod Lake	VF2273	96.1 FM	8 watts	VLP	Query	
Prince Rupert	VF2119	98.1 FM	22 watts	LP	Query	
Moberly	VF2077	96.1 FM	31 watts	LP	Query	
Smithers	VF2169	95.1 FM	12 watts	LP	Query	2008-74
Nautley	VF2274	98.1 FM	49 watts	LP	Query	
Fort St. James	VF2064	97.1 FM	8 watts	VLP	Query	
Nemaiah Valley	VF2228	96.1 FM	10 watts	VLP	Query	
New Aiyansh	VF2271	96.1 FM	8 watts	VLP	Query	
Port Simpson	VF2170	96.1 FM	8 watts	VLP	Query	
Redstone Flat	VF2238	96.1 FM	10 watts	VLP	Query	
Skidegate	VF2171	97.1 FM	8 watts	VLP	Query	
Stoney Creek	VF2234	98.1 FM	10 watts	VLP	Query	
Williams Lake	VF2235	96.1 FM	43 watts	LP	Query	
Tache	VF2166	98.1 FM	8 watts	VLP	Query	
Takla Landing	VF2164	96.1 FM	8 watts	VLP	Query	
Telegraph Creek	VF2120	96.1 FM	8 watts	VLP	Query	
Topley	VF2229	95.1 FM	10 watts	VLP	Query	
Tsay Keh Dene	VF2279	96.1 FM	10 watts	VLP	Query	
Anahim Lake	VF2237	96.1 FM	11 watts	LP	Query	
Houston	CFNR-FM-6	96.1 FM	3 watts	VLP	Query	2016-126
Quesnel	CFNR-FM-1	96.1 FM	6 watts	VLP	Query	

On August 7, 2009, CFNR-FM applied to the CRTC to add a transmitter at Hazelton/Seely Mountain at 96.1 MHz. This application was approved on December 14, 2009.

On October 25, 2013, CFNR-FM received approval to change the authorized contours of VF2073 Quesnel by increasing the transmitter's average effective radiated power from 1.6 to 6.5 watts (non-directional antenna) and the effective height of antenna above average terrain from 81 to 236.2 metres, and by relocating the transmitter site. The change in site was due to frequent vandalism acts committed on the site, which resulted in violations that occurred beyond the station's control, such as the transmitter broadcasting an empty carrier.

On May 21, 2015, CFNR-FM received approval to operate a low-power FM rebroadcasting transmitter at Fort Nelson at 96.1 MHz with an effective radiated power (ERP) of 8 watts (non-directional antenna with an effective height of antenna above average terrain (EHAAT) of 36.7 metres).

On December 8, 2015, CFNR-FM received approval to operate a low-power FM rebroadcasting transmitter at Hartley Bay at 96.1 MHz with an effective radiated power (ERP) of 8 watts (non-directional antenna with an effective height of antenna above average terrain (EHAAT) of -66.8 metres).

=== Future transmitters ===
- Metlakatla - 98.1 MHz
- Toosey Indian Reserve - 96.1 MHz
