= Pow Wow Chow (TV series) =

Pow Wow Chow is a Canadian television series, which premiered in 2024 on APTN. The series profiles Bob Chiblow and Shawn Adler, two First Nations chefs who spend each summer travelling across Canada to sell street food, such as frybread tacos and fried fish, on the pow-wow circuit.

The series was produced by InterINDigital and SandBay Entertainment, and premiered May 9, 2024, on APTN.
