= WBUB-LP =

- Portsmouth, New Hampshire; United States
- Frequency: 96.1 MHz
- Branding: The Branch 96.1 FM

Programming
- Format: Contemporary Christian music

Ownership
- Owner: Cultural Media Connection

Technical information
- Licensing authority: FCC
- Facility ID: 194496
- Class: LP1
- ERP: 15 watts
- HAAT: 71 meters (233 ft)
- Transmitter coordinates: 43°03′11.3″N 70°46′02.2″W

Links
- Public license information: LMS
- Webcast: Listen live
- Website: www.thebranch961.com

WBUB-LP (96.1 FM, "The Branch 96.1 FM") is a radio station licensed to serve the community of Portsmouth, New Hampshire. The station is owned by Cultural Media Connection and airs a contemporary Christian music format.

The station was assigned the WBUB-LP call letters by the Federal Communications Commission on February 7, 2014.
