= XHGPE-FM =

Radio station in Guadalupe, Zacatecas

- Guadalupe, Zacatecas; Mexico
- Broadcast area: Zacatecas metropolitan area
- Frequency: 96.1 FM
- Branding: La Voz Radio

Programming
- Format: Talk

Ownership
- Owner: ImagenZac; (Rate Cultural y Educativa de México, A.C.)

History
- First air date: 2019
- Call sign meaning: GuadaluPE

Technical information
- Licensing authority: CRT
- Class: A
- ERP: 2 kW
- HAAT: 143.6 m (471 ft)
- Transmitter coordinates: 22°45′48.45″N 102°33′43.6″W

Links
- Website: XHGPE-FM on Facebook

XHGPE-FM is a talk station on 96.1 FM in Guadalupe, Zacatecas. It is known as La Voz and owned by Rate Cultural y Educativa de México, A.C., for the ImagenZac group which includes the Imagen de Zacatecas newspaper.

== History ==
XHGPE-FM was approved by the IFT on December 14, 2016. Testing began on April 11, 2019, but full-time regular programming did not commence until August 28. The station broadcasts music, talk shows, and news provided by the newspaper's reporters.
