= KDOL-LP =

- Livingston, Texas; United States
- Frequency: 96.1 MHz

Programming
- Format: Country

Ownership
- Owner: Lake Livingston Broadcasting

Technical information
- Licensing authority: FCC
- Facility ID: 134491
- Class: L1
- ERP: 6 watts
- HAAT: 123.5 meters (405 ft)
- Transmitter coordinates: 30°41′38″N 94°56′12″W

Links
- Public license information: LMS

KDOL-LP (96.1 FM) is a radio station licensed to Livingston, Texas, United States. The station is currently owned by Lake Livingston Broadcasting.
