= Douglas Waller =

American journalist (born 1949)

Douglas C. Waller is an author, lecturer, and former correspondent for Time magazine and Newsweek.

== Biography ==
Douglas Waller was born on June 30, 1949, in Norfolk, Virginia, and holds a B.A. in English from Wake Forest University as well as an M.A. in Urban Administration from the University of North Carolina at Charlotte.

Waller describes himself as a veteran correspondent, author, and lecturer. From 1994 to 2007, Waller served in TIME Magazine's Washington Bureau, where he covered foreign affairs as a diplomatic correspondent. He came to TIME in 1994 from Newsweek, where he reported on major military conflicts. Waller joined Newsweek in 1988, after serving as a legislative assistant on the staffs of Senator William Proxmire and Representative Edward J. Markey.

In a review posted online on June 25, 2015, Kirkus Reviews described his book Disciples as "one of the more interesting spy books this year." In the October 3–4, 2015 "Five Best" column in The Wall Street Journal Books section, Waller presented his personal choice of what he considered to be the five best works on American espionage in World War II.

== Private life ==
Waller and his wife, Judy, live in Raleigh, North Carolina.

== Bibliography ==
=== Reports ===
- SDI: Progress and Challenges, with Douglas M. Cook and James T. Bruce, III. (March 17, 1986).

Staff report submitted to Senator William Proxmire, Senator J. Bennett Johnston and Senator Lawton Chiles.

=== Books ===
- The Strategic Defense Initiative, Progress and Challenges: A Guide to Issues and References, with Douglas M. Cook and James T. Bruce, III. Claremont, Calif.: Regina Books (1987). ISBN 0941690245. 172 p.
- Congress and the Nuclear Freeze: An Inside Look at the Politics of a Mass Movement. Amherst: University of Massachusetts Press (1987). ISBN 0870235591.
- Commandos: The Making of America's Secret Soldiers, from Training to Desert Storm. New York: Simon & Schuster (1994). ISBN 0-671-78717-9.
- Air Warriors: The Inside Story of the Making of a Navy Pilot. New York: Simon & Schuster (1998). ISBN 0-440-23531-6.
- Big Red: The Three-Month Voyage of a Trident Nuclear Submarine. New York: HarperCollins (2001). ISBN 0-380-82078-1.
- A Question of Loyalty: Gen. Billy Mitchell and the Court-Martial that Gripped the Nation. New York: HarperCollins Publishers (2004). ISBN 0-06-050547-8.
- Wild Bill Donovan: The Spymaster Who Created the OSS and Modern American Espionage. New York: Free Press (2011). ISBN 1-4165-6744-5.
- Disciples: The World War II Missions of the CIA Directors Who Fought for Wild Bill Donovan. New York: Simon & Schuster (2015). ISBN 978-1451693720.
- Lincoln's Spies: Their Secret War to Save a Nation. New York: Simon & Schuster (2019). ISBN 978-1501126840.
- The Determined Spy: The Turbulent Life and Times of CIA Pioneer Frank Wisner. Penguin Publishing (2025).

=== Reviews and criticism of Waller's work ===
- Menand, Louis (Mar. 14, 2011). "Books: Wild Thing." The New Yorker, vol. 87, no. 4. pp. 69–72.
