= CFPO-FM =

Indigenous radio station in Ontario, Canada

- Ottawa, Ontario; Canada
- Broadcast area: National Capital Region
- Frequency: 95.7 MHz
- Branding: 95.7 ELMNT FM

Programming
- Format: Indigenous Peoples radio (Talk, Pop, Rock and R&B)

Ownership
- Owner: First Peoples Radio
- Sister stations: CFPT-FM

History
- First air date: October 24, 2018
- Last air date: September 1, 2025
- Call sign meaning: First Peoples Ottawa

Technical information
- Class: B1
- ERP: 9,100 watts
- HAAT: 117.4 metres (385 ft)

Links
- Website: Archived official website

CFPO-FM (95.7 FM, 95.7 ELMNT FM) was an indigenous peoples' radio station in Ottawa. Owned by First Peoples Radio, a subsidiary of Dadan Sivunivut, it broadcast music and talk programming targeting the First Nations community. Music was both from mainstream and indigenous artists.

CFPO-FM had an effective radiated power (ERP) of 9,100 watts. The transmitter was atop Tower C at Place de Ville on Queen Street at Lyon Street in Ottawa. The station ceased operations on September 1, 2025.

== History ==
On June 14, 2017, the CRTC awarded licences for five new Indigenous radio stations in Calgary, Edmonton, Ottawa, Toronto and Vancouver. The new stations would replace the Voices Radio network (whose licenses were revoked in 2015 due to long-term compliance issues). The Ottawa (CFPO-FM) and Toronto (CFPT-FM) licences were awarded to First Peoples Radio, a subsidiary of APTN, with the Ottawa station inheriting Voices Radio's 95.7 FM frequency.

In June 2018, it was announced that the two First Peoples Radio stations would brand as Elmnt FM, and air a mixture of music and talk programming, including pop, rock and R&B music. At least 25% of the music played by the station will be by indigenous Canadian musicians.

The station officially launched on October 24, 2018, as CFPO-FM.

The 95.7 MHz FM frequency in Ottawa had previously been used by Voices Radio's CKAV-FM-9 since the 2000s until it left the air in 2014.

In May 2024, the CRTC rejected an application by First Peoples Radio requesting that $2 million in tangible benefits funding being paid by Stingray Group be redirected for two years to support CFPO-FM and its Toronto sister station CFPT-FM. FPR chairman Jean LaRose said the application was a last ditch effort to keep the stations operational due to the impact the COVID-19 pandemic has on advertising revenue. Staff at the stations had been cut from 26 to 6 leaving no on-air personalities. As a result of the CRTC decision "we have to see just how far we can go and decide whether we have to close in the coming months if we’re not seeing growth in advertising revenue,” said LaRose.

On August 30, 2025, First Peoples Radio announced that it would be ceasing operations, as a result shutting down both CFPO-FM and Toronto sister station CFPT-FM on September 1, 2025, at 12am.

The CRTC revoked CFPO-FM's license on October 2, 2025.

Shortly after the revocation of CFPO-FM's license in early October 2025, the 95.7 MHz frequency became available to a community radio station, CJRO-FM to serve the comunities in eastern rural Ottawa.

On February 18, 2026, the CRTC issued call applications for new Indigenous radio stations to serve Ottawa (95.7 MHz) and Toronto (106.5 MHz).
