= DWLV-FM =

Radio station in Naga, Camarines Sur, Philippines

BBS FM (DWLV)
- Naga; Philippines
- Broadcast area: Camarines Sur and surrounding areas
- Frequency: 91.9 MHz
- Branding: 91.9 BBS FM

Programming
- Languages: Bicolano, Filipino, English
- Format: Classic Hits, News, Talk

Ownership
- Owner: Bicol Broadcasting System
- Sister stations: DWLV 603; 96.5 Radyo Kafuerte

History
- First air date: 2004
- Former call signs: DZLR (2004–2015)
- Former names: Mixx FM (2004–2015)

Technical information
- Licensing authority: NTC
- Power: 10,000 watts

DWLV (91.9 FM), broadcasting as 91.9 BBS FM, is a radio station owned and operated by Bicol Broadcasting System. The station's studio and transmitter are located at the BBS Bldg., Balatas Rd., Brgy. Balatas, Naga, Camarines Sur.

== History ==
The station was established in 2004 as Mixx FM airing a mass-based format, with news and talk in the morning. In 2017, it rebranded as BBS FM and switched to a classic hits format, albeit retaining its news and talk programming.
