= KXXO =

Radio station in Olympia, Washington

- Olympia, Washington; United States
- Broadcast area: South Puget Sound
- Frequency: 96.1 MHz
- Branding: X96.1

Programming
- Language: Spanish
- Format: Latin pop, adult contemporary

Ownership
- Owner: 3 Cities, Inc. (sale pending to Bustos Media)
- Operator: Bustos Media

History
- First air date: January 16, 1990

Technical information
- Licensing authority: FCC
- Facility ID: 67027
- Class: C
- ERP: 37,000 watts
- HAAT: 717 meters (2,352 ft)
- Transmitter coordinates: 46°58′22.4″N 123°8′22.5″W

Links
- Public license information: Public file; LMS
- Webcast: Listen live
- Website: www.kxxo.com

KXXO (96.1 FM, "X96.1") is a radio station licensed to Olympia, Washington. Owned by 3 Cities, Inc. and operated by Bustos Media under a transitional local marketing agreement, it broadcasts a Latin pop and adult contemporary format serving the South Puget Sound region of Washington, including Tacoma.

== History ==
After a week of signal testing and stunting with nature sounds, the station officially signed on at 7 a.m. on January 16, 1990, with an adult contemporary format as "Mixx 96.1." The station was owned by Dave Rauh and Toni Holm, formerly of KAOS, doing business as 3 Cities, Inc..

KXXO was originally located in downtown Olympia at Washington Street and State Avenue in the Rockway-Leland Building; operations remained at the site until its sale in 2025. The station, as described by Holm, was meant to provide "soft rock for the Great Northwest". Reaching 85,000 watts, broadcasts reached from British Columbia to northern Oregon.

In August 2025, 3 Cities announced that it would sell the station to Bustos Media for $1.5 million. The purchase made KXXO the company's fifth station in the Seattle-Tacoma market. On October 27, 2025, Bustos Media took over operations of the station; programming was converted to a predominantly-Spanish language format branded as X96.1. The new format features a mix of Latin pop and English-language adult contemporary music.

== Programming ==
In 2009, Dick Pust, formally a long-time radio host at Olympia's KGY radio station, began anchoring a weekend show at KXXO. The interview program was known as “Your Community.”
