= DWBN =

Radio station in Naga, Camarines Sur

Radyo Kafuerte (DWBN)
- Naga; Philippines
- Broadcast area: Camarines Sur and surrounding areas
- Frequency: 96.5 MHz
- Branding: 96.5 Radyo Kafuerte

Programming
- Languages: Bicolano, Filipino
- Format: News, public affairs, talk

Ownership
- Owner: Bicol Broadcasting System
- Operator: Camarines Sur Provincial Government
- Sister stations: DWLV 603; 91.9 BBS FM

History
- First air date: 2025

Technical information
- Licensing authority: NTC
- Power: 10 kW

96.5 Radyo Kafuerte (DWBN 96.5 MHz) is an FM station owned by Bicol Broadcasting System and operated by the provincial government of Camarines Sur. Its studio is located at the 4th Floor, Annelle Bldg., Biak na Bato, Brgy. Tabuco, Naga, Camarines Sur, and its transmitter is located at Sipocot.
