= Moondance International Film Festival =

Annual film festival held in Boulder, USA

- Location: Boulder, Colorado
- Founded: 1999
- Website: moondancefilmfestival.com

The Moondance International Film Festival is an American independent annual film festival that takes place in the fall. Founded in 1999, it has usually been held in Boulder, Colorado, and occasionally in Los Angeles and New York City.

The festival honors filmmakers, writers and composers who actively increase awareness, provide multiple viewpoints, address complex social issues, and strengthen ties between international audiences. Some of its initial intentions were to give a cinematic voice to nonviolent conflict resolution; women and their stories, particularly those told from their perspective or with a female sensitivity; and inspirational and educational stories about environmental issues. According to the festival's website, the festival and festival entrants are "independent, mostly uncensored (except for gratuitous violence), totally unfettered, often irreverent, and definitely not beholden to any special interests. We select films, written works and music with these criteria: a unique story, well-told."

== Inception ==
The festival was founded in 1999, following the events of the Columbine High School massacre, by Elizabeth English, a film technician and Boulder, Colorado resident. The intention was for the festival to be an empowering outlet for underrepresented storytelling and for people to share their perspectives in a fresh and non-violent way. English's desire was "to make a ... difference in the world and make the audience a part of that." The festival also offers an opportunity for writers, composers and filmmakers to participate in workshops with professionals and to receive a consultation.

English named the festival Moondance as a complementary contrast to the Sundance Film Festival, where in 22 years no women filmmakers had won. In its first year, the Moondance festival was only open to women, but it has subsequently been open to all.

Past sponsors of the festival have included Jodie Foster, the Writers Guild of America West, Celestial Seasonings and Oprah Winfrey's O magazine.

== Awards ==
=== Spirit of Moondance Award ===
Women writers and filmmakers. Men may be co-writers or co-filmmakers, but the entry must be submitted by a woman.

=== Seahorse Award ===
Male writers and filmmakers. Women may be co-writers or co-filmmakers, but the entry must be submitted by a man.

=== Sandcastle Award ===
Male and female writing or filmmaking teams where both men and women or a man and woman work as a team on the project.

=== Gaia Award ===
To encourage and inspire contemplative, meditative, spiritual and inspirational films and scripts. The award is presented to the person who seeks to elucidate and improve the spiritual quality of all life on the planet, and contributes to the betterment of the world spirit.

=== Columbine Award ===
Work which reflects non-violent conflict resolution, alternatives to violence, or show why violent resolution to conflict is counter-productive. The submitted material may not contain gratuitous violence.

=== Dolphin Award ===
Young people 18 years of age or younger, male or female. Moondance accepts submissions for this award in the genres of short narrative, documentary, multi-media, music videos, or animation video film, as well as short screenplays, short stories or short stageplays.

=== Starfish Award ===
Comedy projects submitted by writers and filmmakers.

=== Colorado Ocean Award ===
Projects created by Colorado writers, filmmakers and composers.

=== Abyss Award ===
For well-made and meaningful thriller, horror or supernatural films, written works & film scores.

=== Atlantis Award ===
Writers, filmmakers and composers who have submitted projects, in any category, from a foreign country outside the U.S.

=== DGA Director Award ===
Presented to the filmmaker whose film is screened at Moondance and who is selected by both the Directors Guild of America and the Moondance executive director.

=== Audience Favorite Awards ===
Films receiving the highest audience votes.

=== Calypso Award ===
To encourage a spirit of enterprise in saving the environment, habitats and wildlife by creative individuals from around the world. Presented to the person who expands knowledge of our world, seeks to improve our quality of all life on the planet, and contributes to the betterment of humankind.

=== Neptune Award ===
Male or female writer or filmmaker, over the age of 75, who has created either a single work of the highest quality or a body of quality work, and who continues to strive for excellence in his or her career in the entertainment industry, and who inspires and encourages others by his or her example.

=== Cinema Pioneer Award ===
Special recognition of a living pioneer in early cinema; a person who had a significant role in contributing a body of work to the silent-film era, either as a writer, director, producer, cinematographer, film editor, actor or actress.

=== Living Legacy Award ===
To honor and recognize women in the film industry who have contributed most to insuring that women's work is recognized and appreciated for its worth, who help women achieve success in film, and who have themselves contributed a vital body of work, and who and continue to contribute to this vital effort.

== See also ==
- Lilith Fair
