= Northern Native Broadcasting =

Non-profit Indigenous communications company in British Columbia

Northern Native Broadcasting is a non-profit Indigenous communications company in British Columbia which owns and operates radio stations whose music and primary content is intended to be of interest to Indigenous peoples in Canada.

The company founded and owns CFNR-FM in Terrace, British Columbia, and a series of rebroadcasting transmitters, branded as the CFNR Network, that gives the station, which has been on the air since 1992, coverage throughout the British Columbia Interior in northern and central British Columbia, to an audience of over 150,000 listeners in 70 communities.

== CJNY-FM ==
In 2017, the company was awarded a license for a Class B Native station in Vancouver, CKUR-FM at 106.3 MHz, which was to commence broadcasting in June 2018 and will be heard in Greater Vancouver and the Lower Mainland. The frequency was previously used by the Aboriginal Voices Radio Network until its license was revoked in 2015.

According to the station's application to the CRTC, "the primary objective of the CKUR programming day is to reflect – through information and entertainment – the social, political, economic, and cultural concerns of the Aboriginal communities in Vancouver and throughout the Lower Mainland area. It is also intended to act as a cultural link between Vancouver First Nations peoples and their more remote home Nations." Its music programming will focus on highlighting Indigenous performers as well as blues, and Canadian-centric roots rock, and classic hits. According to a media release: "CKUR will provide an aboriginal perspective in Vancouver radio reflecting the values and cultures of the three primary First Nations communities in the broadcast area – Squamish Nation, Tsleil-Waututh Nation and the Musqueam Indian Band".

The callsign was later changed as CJNY-FM as Northern Native Broadcasting named the new station "The Journey". Eventually, after repeatedly extending CJNY-FM's construction permit from ISEDC, CJNY-FM began their signal test on December 5, 2022 and launched on March 3, 2023.
