= Aboriginal Voices Radio Network =

Former Canadian indigenous radio network

Voices Radio (CKAV-FM)
- Toronto, Ontario; Canada
- Broadcast area: Toronto, Calgary, Edmonton, Vancouver

Programming
- Format: Adult contemporary

Ownership
- Owner: Aboriginal Voices Radio Inc.

History
- First air date: 2002
- Last air date: November 2016
- Former call signs: CFIE-FM (2002–2006)
- Former names: Aboriginal Voices Radio Network (2002–2014)

Links
- Website: www.voicesradio.ca www.aboriginalvoices.com www.avrradio.com (All dead links)

Aboriginal Voices Radio Network (rebranded as Voices Radio in 2014) was a Canadian radio network, which primarily broadcast music programming and other content of interest to aboriginal people. As of June 2015, the network operated stations in Toronto, Ontario (where its studios and offices were located); Calgary and Edmonton in Alberta; and Vancouver, British Columbia. All of its stations were licensed as rebroadcasters of its flagship station, CKAV-FM in Toronto. The network's administrative office was located in Ohsweken, Ontario, on the Six Nations Indian reserve near Brantford. The stations' music programming consisted mainly of adult contemporary music (including both mainstream and indigenous artists), along with specialty programs focusing on aboriginal-oriented content.

On June 25, 2015, the Canadian Radio-television and Telecommunications Commission revoked Voices Radio's broadcast licences effective July 25, 2015, citing a long-term history of non-compliance with conditions of their licences. The CRTC issued a call for applications for new radio services in the markets vacated by the network, with special priority given to new First Nations services. The suspension was stayed on July 23, 2015, by the Federal Court of Appeal, pending the outcome of a request for a leave to appeal the CRTC's decision. The stay was lifted on November 10, 2016, when AVR lost its appeal and the network left the air shortly afterwards.

== History ==
Aboriginal Voices Radio Network (AVR) was founded in 1998 by a group of high-profile aboriginal Canadians, including actor Gary Farmer, playwright, novelist and author Tomson Highway, filmmaker Alanis Obomsawin and actress/producer Jennifer Podemski. The brand descended from Aboriginal Voices magazine, edited by Farmer, which published from 1993 to 1999, and Aboriginal Voices Festival which ran annually in Toronto from 1998 to 2000. Other founders and key contributors to creation of the network included project manager and training coordinator Brian Wright-McLeod, Christopher Spence and Andre Morriseau (production and programming), John Matthews and Mark MacLeod (licensing), Robert Templeton and J. Robert Wood (corporate funding), Elaine Bomberry, David Deleary, Sherman Maness, Nicole Robertson, Minnie Two Shoes and Doug Bingley (strategic advice). The network's original scope was to feature programming produced primarily by and for Aboriginal people in Canada, featuring music and personalities from around the world.

AVR's first station, CFIE-FM in Toronto, was licensed by the CRTC in 2000. CFIE changed its callsign to CKAV in 2006. AVR had previously operated on 106.3 FM (JUMP FM) for a short 6 day period in 1998 during the Aboriginal Voices Festival at Harbourfront Centre in Toronto. The network faced technical and logistical problems which have prevented it from launching some of its stations; and the original found here and management were forced out by 2004. The network had applied to the CRTC for extensions five or six times as of the end of 2005. Since then, however, the network had moved forward with most of the approved licenses.

In 2009, the network surrendered its licenses for transmitters in Kitchener, Ontario (CKAV-FM-8, 102.5 MHz) and Montreal (CKAV-FM-10, 106.7 MHz). On August 20, 2009, the CRTC approved an application by Canadian Hellenic Cable Radio (CHCR) to amend the broadcasting licence for its station in Montreal at 106.3 MHz, a second adjacent frequency to CKAV-FM-10 at 106.7 FM, requiring AVR to find an alternative frequency in the event of any interference with the signal of CKAV-FM-10. As of January 2011, CHCR's station, CKIN-FM, has signed on at 106.3 MHz. Another broadcaster, Evanov Communications, has since filed an application for a new station at 106.7 serving the western suburb of Hudson in January 2012; that station, since becoming CHSV-FM, was approved in October 2012.

AVR's outlet in Ottawa, CKAV-FM-9 95.7 MHz was on air until early October 2014, but has been silent since that time. It never returned to air, though it was still listed on its website among the other stations broadcasting.

In December 2014, AVR renamed itself to Voices Radio, as its scope expanded out of the aboriginal realm and more into music from mainstream artists, generally bent towards adult contemporary. In February 2015, Voices Radio began to air old-time radio programs from the United States, nightly from 10 pm to 12 Midnight local time.

=== Loss of broadcast licensing ===
On March 11, 2015, Voices Radio applied with the CRTC to renew all five station licences (including the closed Ottawa outlet), which were to expire on August 31, 2015. On June 25, 2015, the CRTC denied the renewals, revoked their broadcast licenses, and ordered Voices Radio to cease broadcasting by July 25, 2015. The commission cited repeated, long-term failures by Voices Radio to adhere to the requirements of its licenses, such as a failure to broadcast a sufficient amount of local news content in each of its markets that reflects stories of interest to their respective aboriginal communities, and failing to submit annual financial and business reports, program logs, and tapes of broadcast days to the CRTC. The CRTC intends to hold a call for applications for new aboriginal-focused broadcasters to take on CKAV's frequencies. The CRTC's suspension of license in all the network's cities, except for Ottawa, was suspended on July 23, 2015, pending an application by the station for a leave to appeal the CRTC's decision. The appeal was heard on November 8, 2016, and on November 10, the Federal Court of Appeal issued a ruling upholding the CRTC's revocation of AVR's licence.

=== Successors ===
In August 2015, the CRTC issued a call for new licenses to replace Voices Radio in Toronto, Vancouver, Calgary, Edmonton and Ottawa. On February 23, 2016, the CRTC announced that they had received twelve applications for the new stations: two applications for stations in Vancouver, three for Calgary, three for Edmonton, two for Toronto and two for Ottawa. The five organizations that applied were the Aboriginal Multi-Media Society (owner of Alberta's CFWE radio network), Wawatay Native Communications Society, Northern Native Broadcasting (Terrace), VMS Media Group, and First Peoples Radio—a subsidiary of the Aboriginal Peoples Television Network).

The licenses for Voices Radio remained in effect, pending results of their appeal, though the CRTC subsequently announced that Voices Radio's outlets in Calgary and Edmonton had ceased operations, leaving Toronto and Vancouver as being the only stations in the Voices Radio group still broadcasting as of February 2016. As the license revocation was upheld, the remaining stations surrendered their licenses in November 2016.

First Peoples Radio was granted licenses to operate stations in Toronto (CFPT-FM) and Ottawa (CFPO-FM) on AVR's former frequencie and went on the air October 2018 branded as ELMNT FM. After years of financial difficulties, both stations ceased operations on September 1, 2025.

Northern Native Broadcasting (Terrace) was awarded AVR's former Vancouver frequency and would broadcast as CKUR-FM, and AVR's former frequencies in Edmonton and Calgary were awarded to the Aboriginal Multi-Media Society. The new Calgary station, CJWE-FM, signed on in June 2018 with a similar format to CFWE; CIWE-FM Edmonton began full broadcasting in February 2021.

== Stations ==
These four stations were on the air at the time of their license revocation:

- Toronto - CKAV-FM 106.5 MHz
- Vancouver - CKAV-FM-2, 106.3 MHz
- Calgary - CKAV-FM-3 88.1 MHz (ceased operation prior to license revocation)
- Edmonton - CKAV-FM-4 89.3 MHz (ceased operation prior to license revocation)

=== Ceased operation prior to 2015 ===
- Kitchener - CKAV-FM-8, 102.5 MHz (on-air from 2008-2009)
- Ottawa - CKAV-FM-9, 95.7 MHz (on-air 2008-2014)
- Montreal - CKAV-FM-10, 106.7 MHz (on-air from 2008-2009). In 2003, the station previously applied for 100.1 MHz, but was denied that frequency, due to new station CJEB-FM in Trois-Rivières being awarded the frequency.

=== Licensed but never launched ===
Both stations were approved by the CRTC in May 2007 and slated for launch in 2009, but never commenced broadcasting. As of 2022, these frequencies remain unoccupied.

- Regina - 96.1 MHz
- Saskatoon - 102.9 MHz

In 2003, Aboriginal Voices Radio was also approved to broadcast on 850 kHz in Abbotsford, British Columbia, following the conversion of Rogers Communications's CKSR to 107.1 MHz. That station never signed on, and the 850 AM frequency remains vacant.
