= 89.9 FM =

FM radio frequency

The following radio stations broadcast on FM frequency 89.9 MHz:

== Argentina ==
- Del Sol Viale in Viale, Entre Ríos
- LRS872 Aire Libre in Acebal, Santa Fe
- M90 in Rosario, Santa Fe
- Master in Resistencia, Chaco
- Onda Latina in San Carlos Centro, Santa Fe
- Popular in Joaquín V. González, Salta
- Profesional in Salta
- Radio Con Vos in Buenos Aires
- Radio María in Bahía Blanca, Buenos Aires
- Radio María in Goya, Corrientes
- Radio María in Villaguay, Entre Ríos

== Australia ==
- 2VTR in Sydney
- Kiss 90 FM former radio station in Melbourne
- 3TSC in Melbourne
- VL2NI in Burnt Pine, Norfolk Island

== Brazil ==
- 89 FM (ZYC 428) in Fortaleza, Ceará

== Canada (Channel 210) ==
- CBCU-FM in Chapleau, Ontario
- CBE-FM in Windsor, Ontario
- CBFX-FM-4 in Rouyn, Quebec
- CBLR-FM in Parry Sound, Ontario
- CBPQ-FM in Coquihalla, British Columbia
- CBPR-FM in Revelstoke, British Columbia
- CBTE-FM in Crawford Bay, British Columbia
- CBTU-FM in Tumbler Ridge, British Columbia
- CBTX-FM in Bella Bella, British Columbia
- CBVX-FM-1 in Sainte-Anne-de-Beaupre, Quebec
- CFBS-FM in Lourdes-Blanc-Sablon, Quebec
- CFHL-FM in Lansdowne House, Ontario
- CFMR-FM in Meander River, Alberta
- CFNK-FM in Pinehouse Lake, Saskatchewan
- CFWE-FM in Lac La Biche, Alberta
- CHEE-FM in Tobermory, Ontario
- CHEI-FM in South Baymouth, Ontario
- CHII-FM in Brabant, Saskatchewan
- CHIO-FM in Wapekeka, Ontario
- CHIX-FM in Seine River, Ontario
- CHLR-FM in Rigolet, Newfoundland and Labrador
- CHNS-FM in Halifax, Nova Scotia
- CHPN-FM in La Loche, Saskatchewan
- CHTN-FM-2 in St. Edward, Prince Edward Island
- CHWR-FM in Whitesand, Ontario
- CIHT-FM in Ottawa, Ontario
- CIRA-FM-2 in Trois-Rivières, Quebec
- CITK-FM in Obedjiwan, Quebec
- CJAZ-FM in Pelican Narrows, Saskatchewan
- CJBC-FM-2 in Paris, Ontario
- CJCF-FM in Cumberland House, Saskatchewan
- CJCK-FM in Schefferville, Quebec
- CJHL-FM in Hopedale, Newfoundland and Labrador
- CJKX-FM-1 in Sunderland, Ontario
- CJLR-FM in La Ronge, Saskatchewan
- CJLR-FM-1 in Montreal Lake, Saskatchewan
- CJLR-FM-7 in Meadow Lake, Saskatchewan
- CJPL-FM in Postville, Newfoundland and Labrador
- CJPS-FM in Cat Lake, Ontario
- CKCA-FM in Chateh/Assumption, Alberta
- CKFC-FM in North Spirit Lake, Ontario
- CKFN-FM in Ogoki Post, Ontario
- CKID-FM in Constance Lake, Ontario
- CKKE-FM in Mingan, Quebec
- CKKI-FM in Kahnawake, Quebec
- CKMT-FM in Attawapiskat, Ontario
- CKRG-FM in Toronto, Ontario (defunct)
- CKSB-FM in Winnipeg, Manitoba
- CKTC-FM in Red Deer, Alberta
- CKWN-FM in Peawanuck/Winisk, Ontario
- CKWT-FM in Sioux Lookout, Ontario
- CKYW-FM in Summer Beaver, Ontario
- CKZY-FM in Lac Seul/Kejick Bay, Ontario
- VF2084 in Cadotte Lake, Alberta
- VF2085 in Conklin, Alberta
- VF2087 in Fort Chipewyan, Alberta
- VF2090 in John D'Or Prairie, Alberta
- VF2092 in Loon Lake, Alberta
- VF2093 in Zama Lake, Alberta
- VF2176 in Boyer River, Alberta
- VF2177 in Bushe River, Alberta
- VF2178 in Chard/Janvier Reservation, Alberta
- VF2179 in Child Lake, Alberta
- VF2180 in Desmarais/Wabasca, Alberta
- VF2182 in Fort McKay, Alberta
- VF2183 in Goodfish Lake, Alberta
- VF2186 in North Tallcree Reservation, Alberta
- VF2187 in Paddle Prairie, Alberta
- VF2188 in Peavine, Alberta
- VF2191 in South Tallcree Reservation, Alberta
- VF2192 in Sturgeon Lake, Alberta
- VF2201 in Kemano, British Columbia
- VF2241 in Anzac, Alberta
- VF2242 in Beaver Lake, Alberta
- VF2243 in Duncan's Band, Alberta
- VF2244 in Buffalo Lake Settlement, Alberta
- VF2251 in Heart Lake, Alberta
- VF2252 in Horse Lake, Alberta
- VF2254 in Kikino, Alberta
- VF2255 in Peerless Lake, Alberta
- VF2256 in Sandy Lake, Alberta
- VF2257 in Trout Lake, Alberta
- VF2258 in Whitefish/Atikameg, Alberta
- VF2281 in Kangiqsualujjuaq, Quebec
- VF2299 in Fond du Lac Reserve, Saskatchewan
- VF2301 in Shoal Lake Reserve, Saskatchewan
- VF2372 in Moosonee, Ontario
- VF2383 in Cauvet, Quebec
- VF2527 in Sicamous, British Columbia
- VF2553 in Trail, British Columbia
- VF2569 in Merritt, British Columbia
- VF7077 in Regina, Saskatchewan
- VF7301 in Brandon, Manitoba

== China ==
- CNR Music Radio in Haikou
- CNR The Voice of China in Harbin and Ulanqab
- SMG Voice Of Changjiang-River Delta Radio

== Malaysia ==
- BFM 89.9
- Fly FM in Penang and Taiping, Perak
- Sabah FM in Kota Kinabalu, Sabah
- TraXX FM in Kuching, Sarawak

== Mexico ==
- XHCCBB-FM in Puerto Vallarta, Jalisco
- XHCTN-FM in La Trinitaria, Chiapas
- XHCB-FM in Ciudad Juárez, Chihuahua
- XHEIN-FM in Cintalapa de Figueroa, Chiapas
- XHEPC-FM in Zacatecas, Zacatecas
- XHHN-FM in Nogales, Sonora
- XHHU-FM in Martínez de la Torre, Veracruz
- XHIB-FM in Caborca, Sonora
- XHITC-FM in Celaya, Guanajuato
- XHJQ-FM in Parras de la Fuente, Coahuila
- XHLP-FM in La Piedad, Michoacán
- XHRA-FM in Guadalajara, Jalisco
- XHRB-FM in Cozumel, Quintana Roo
- XHPEAH-FM in Tapachula, Chiapas
- XHSOL-FM in Mexicali, Baja California
- XHTQS-FM in Tequisquiapan, Querétaro
- XHTXP-FM in Tuxtepec, Oaxaca
- XHUPES-FM in Culiacán, Sinaloa
- XHURI-FM in Urique-Creel, Chihuahua

== Japan ==
- JOIV-FM in Kobe, Hyogo

== Netherlands ==
- 3FM in West-Terschelling, Friesland

== Philippines ==
- DWTM in Metro Manila
- DYKI in Cebu City
- DXGN in Davao City
- DWFX in Legazpi City
- DXZB-FM in Zamboanga City

== United States (Channel 210) ==
- KACV in Amarillo, Texas
- KAIG in Dodge City, Kansas
- KAUF in Kennett, Missouri
- KAWZ in Twin Falls, Idaho
- KAYP in Burlington, Iowa
- KBDE (FM) in Temple, Texas
- KBFT (FM) in Nett Lake, Minnesota
- KBGA in Missoula, Montana
- KBNL in Laredo, Texas
- KBSK in McCall, Idaho
- KBYA in Afton, Wyoming
- KCRH in Hayward, California
- KCRW in Santa Monica, California
- KCVG in Hastings, Nebraska
- KCVY in Cabool, Missouri
- KDAQ in Shreveport, Louisiana
- KDFC in Angwin, California
- KDLG-FM in Dillingham, Alaska
- KDLI in Del Rio, Texas
- KDPR in Dickinson, North Dakota
- KDVI in Devils Lake, North Dakota
- KEFR in Le Grand, California
- KEUW in Torrington, Wyoming
- KEWR-FM in Cedar Rapids, Iowa
- KFER in Santa Cruz, California
- KFLV (FM) in Wilber, Nebraska
- KFRS in Soledad, California
- KFRY in Pueblo, Colorado
- KGHP in Gig Harbor, Washington
- KGNA in Arnold, Missouri
- KGNV (FM) in Washington, Missouri
- KGPR in Great Falls, Montana
- KGRG in Auburn, Washington
- KGRJ in Chamberlain, South Dakota
- KHCF in Morgan Hill, California
- KHIS in Jackson, Missouri
- KHSG in Garberville, California
- KINU in Kotzebue, Alaska
- KIPL in Lihu'e, Hawaii
- KJCU in Fort Bragg, California
- KJEM in Pullman, Washington
- KJIH in Manhattan, Kansas
- KJRC in Rapid City, South Dakota
- KJTA in Flagstaff, Arizona
- KJTW in Jamestown, North Dakota
- KKJA in Redmond, Oregon
- KKWE in White Earth, Minnesota
- KLGS in College Station, Texas
- KLKI in Bullhead City, Arizona
- KLVA in Superior, Arizona
- KLXA in Alexandria, Louisiana
- KMCV in High Point, Missouri
- KMOJ in Minneapolis, Minnesota
- KMWC in Bethany, Missouri
- KORU in Garapan-Saipan, Northern Marianas Islands
- KPCO-FM in Cooper, Texas
- KPCY-LP in Lake Providence, Louisiana
- KPLW in Wenatchee, Washington
- KPRE in Vail, Colorado
- KQAC in Portland, Oregon
- KQNV in Fallon, Nevada
- KQVI-FM in Cedar Lake, Texas
- KQXB in Breckenridge, Texas
- KRBX in Caldwell, Idaho
- KRGM in Marshall, Minnesota
- KRJE in Hawkeye, Iowa
- KRPR in Rochester, Minnesota
- KRPS in Pittsburg, Kansas
- KSJY in Saint Martinville, Louisiana
- KTAD in Sterling, Colorado
- KTHF in Hammon, Oklahoma
- KTLZ in Cuero, Texas
- KTMH in Montrose, Colorado
- KTPR in Stanton, Texas
- KTSW in San Marcos, Texas
- KUAC in Fairbanks, Alaska
- KUDA in Bonneville, Wyoming
- KUKL (FM) in Kalispell, Montana
- KUNM in Albuquerque, New Mexico
- KVMN in Cave City, Arkansas
- KWAR in Waverly, Iowa
- KWCN in Pinedale, Wyoming
- KWHA in West Helena, Arkansas
- KWKL in Grandfield, Oklahoma
- KXIR in Freeland, Washington
- KXPE-LP in Austin, Texas
- KXSW in Sisseton, South Dakota
- KXUW in Alta, Wyoming
- KYCM in Alamogordo, New Mexico
- KYEP-LP in Eagle Pass, Texas
- KYMS in Rathdrum, Idaho
- KYPC in Colstrip, Montana
- KYPM in Livingston, Montana
- KZIC in Hondo, Texas
- WAKD in Sheffield, Alabama
- WAPJ in Torrington, Connecticut
- WATI in Vincennes, Indiana
- WAYW in New Johnsonville, Tennessee
- WBWA in Buffalo, New York
- WCBU in Peoria, Illinois
- WCDE in Elkins, West Virginia
- WCGV in Cambridge Springs, Pennsylvania
- WCMD in Barre, Vermont
- WCNO in Palm City, Florida
- WCXB in Benton Harbor, Michigan
- WDAV in Davidson, North Carolina
- WDJD in Aitken, Minnesota
- WDPG in Greenville, Ohio
- WDVX in Clinton, Tennessee
- WEGT in Greensburg, Indiana
- WERU in Blue Hill, Maine
- WEVL in Memphis, Tennessee
- WGLG in Swanton, Vermont
- WHLP in Hanna, Indiana
- WHPL in West Lafayette, Indiana
- WHRJ in Washington Court House, Virginia
- WHSA in Brule, Wisconsin
- WHSF in Rhinelander, Wisconsin
- WHWG in Trout Lake, Michigan
- WJCT in Jacksonville, Florida
- WJPH in Woodbine, New Jersey
- WJTF in Panama City, Florida
- WJWJ in Beaufort, South Carolina
- WKCR in New York City
- WKDS in Kalamazoo, Michigan
- WKVO in Georgetown, Kentucky
- WKWR in Key West, Florida
- WLCA in Godfrey, Illinois
- WLHS in West Chester, Ohio
- WLJN in Traverse City, Michigan
- WLKL in Mattoon, Illinois
- WMAB in Mississippi State, Mississippi
- WMLG in Guayanilla, Puerto Rico
- WMRL in Lexington, Virginia
- WMTB in Emmitsburg, Maryland
- WNJM in Manahawkin, New Jersey
- WNRS in Sweet Briar, Virginia
- WOEL in Elkton, Maryland
- WOMB in Ellettsville, Indiana
- WOPG in Esperance, New York
- WORT in Madison, Wisconsin
- WPIR in Culpeper, Virginia
- WQTQ in Hartford, Connecticut
- WRIM in Cookeville, Tennessee
- WRRD in Greensboro, Georgia
- WRRO in Edon, Ohio
- WRVO in Oswego, New York
- WRVS in Elizabeth City, North Carolina
- WSCB in Springfield, Massachusetts
- WSOF in Madisonville, Kentucky
- WSUF in Noyack, New York
- WSWS (FM) in Smithboro, Illinois
- WTBB in Gadsden, Alabama
- WTHS in Holland, Michigan
- WTLR in State College, Pennsylvania
- WTSU in Montgomery-Troy, Alabama
- WUCF in Orlando, Florida
- WUTD-FM in Utuado, Puerto Rico
- WVFL in Fond du Lac, Wisconsin
- WVIA in Scranton, Pennsylvania
- WVKJ in Dublin, New Hampshire
- WVNP in Wheeling, West Virginia
- WVRU in Radford, Virginia
- WVWV in Huntington, West Virginia
- WWNO in New Orleans, Louisiana
- WWSP in Stevens Point, Wisconsin
- WWVT-FM in Ferrum, Virginia
- WXLG in North Creek, New York
- WXTR in Tappahannock, Virginia
- WYBV in Wakarusa, Indiana
- WYFR-LP in Fairhope, Alabama
- WZCO in Chadbourn, North Carolina
- WZTN in Cornersville, Tennessee

== Costa Rica ==
- TIRB-FM in San José, Centro
