= Cave City High School =

Location
- 620 North Main Street; Cave City, Arkansas 72521; United States
- Coordinates: 35°56′50″N 91°32′55″W

Information
- School type: Public comprehensive
- Status: Open
- School district: Cave City School District
- CEEB code: 040405
- NCES School ID: 050405000148
- Teaching staff: 63.67 (on FTE basis)
- Grades: 9–12
- Enrollment: 359 (2023-2024)
- Student to teacher ratio: 5.64
- Education system: ADE Smart Core
- Classes offered: Regular, Advanced Placement (AP)
- Colors: Red and white
- Athletics: Football, Volleyball, Golf, Basketball, Tennis, Baseball, Softball, Track, Cheer
- Athletics conference: 4A Region 3
- Mascot: Caveman
- Team name: Cave City Cavemen
- Accreditation: ADE
- Feeder schools: Cave City Middle School (7–8)
- Website: www.cavecity.k12.ar.us

Cave City High School is a comprehensive public high school located in the fringe town of Cave City, Arkansas, United States. The school provides secondary education for students in grades 9 through 12. It is one of three public high schools in Sharp County, Arkansas and the sole high school administered by the Cave City School District.

== Academics ==
Cave City High School is accredited by the Arkansas Department of Education (ADE). The assumed course of study follows the Smart Core curriculum developed by the ADE. Students complete regular (core and elective) and career focus coursework and exams and may take Advanced Placement (AP) courses and exams with the opportunity to receive college credit.

== Extracurricular activities ==
The Cave City High School mascot and athletic emblem is the Caveman with red and white serving as the school colors.

=== Athletics ===
The Cave City Cavemen compete in interscholastic activities within the 4A Classification via the 4A Region 3 Conference, as administered by the Arkansas Activities Association. The Cavemen field teams in football, golf (boys/girls), tennis (boys/girls), basketball (boys/girls), baseball, softball, track and field (boys/girls), and cheer.
