= KPCO =

KPCO may refer to:

- KPCO-FM, a radio station (89.9 FM) licensed to serve Cooper, Texas, United States
- KRAC, a radio station (1370 AM) licensed to serve Red Bluff, California, United States, which held the call sign KPCO from 1968 to 2009
