= University of Wisconsin–Stevens Point =

Public university in Stevens Point, Wisconsin, US

- Former names: Stevens Point Normal School (1894–1927); Central State Teachers College (1927–1951); Wisconsin State College–Stevens Point (1951–1964); Wisconsin State University–Stevens Point (1964–1971)
- Type: Public university
- Established: 1894; 132 years ago
- Parent institution: Universities of Wisconsin System
- Accreditation: HLC
- Chancellor: Robert Brinkmann
- Faculty: 450
- Students: 8,251 (2024)
- Location: Stevens Point, Wisconsin, U.S. 44°31′30″N 89°34′05″W
- Campus: 406 acres (164 ha); Urban
- Other campuses: Marshfield, Wausau
- Colors: Purple and gold
- Nickname: Pointers
- Sporting affiliations: NCAA Division III – WIAC
- Mascot: Stevie Pointer
- Website: www.uwsp.edu

The University of Wisconsin–Stevens Point (UW–Stevens Point or UWSP) is a public university in Stevens Point, Wisconsin, United States. Established in 1894, it is part of the University of Wisconsin System. UW-Stevens Point grants associate, baccalaureate, and master's degrees, as well as doctoral degrees in audiology, educational sustainability, and physical therapy. The 406-acre (164 ha) main campus includes the 280-acre (113 ha) Schmeeckle Reserve, 15 academic buildings, and 13 residence halls. UWSP also has two branch campuses located in Wausau and Marshfield.

UW-Stevens Point is organized into five colleges with over 200 undergraduate programs in 125 majors and 89 minors and 25 graduate programs.

UW-Stevens Point has a long history of pioneering new educational fields. UWSP was one of the first schools in the US to educate young women in “domestic science” or home economics, the first university in the US to offer a major in environmental conservation, and the first in the world to offer wellness as a college degree program.

The UW-Stevens Point Pointers compete in 12 intercollegiate sports in NCAA Division III and have won 13 championships.

== History ==
=== Establishment ===
The Wisconsin State Constitution, ratified in 1848, called for a state university as well as a teacher training department in that school. Thus, the University of Wisconsin–Madison was established, yet a teacher training department did not start officially till 1852. In 1857 a Normal School Board of Regents was established to allocate funds to institutions in the state that supported teacher training. Madison's teacher training program (called the Normal Department) separated and rejoined the university twice (1860 and 1863) due to fluctuating Civil War-era interest in teacher education. After a final 1868 split, limited funds furnished to universities that provided teacher education meant many did not invest in this field. The solution identified by the Normal School Board of Regents was to establish Normal Schools around the state for the sole purpose of teacher education. The first regional Normal Schools were established in 1866 in Platteville and Whitewater.

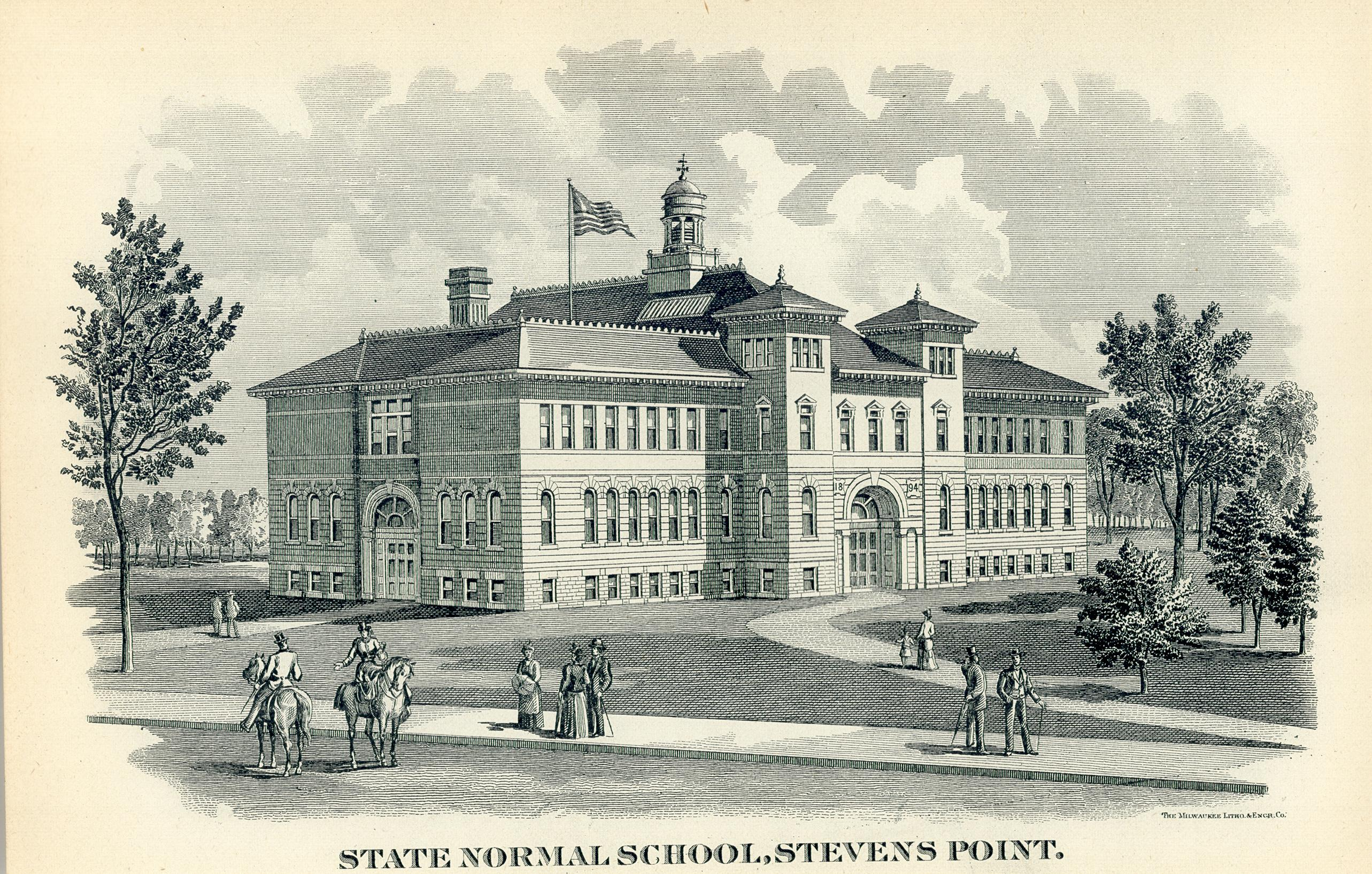
An early drawing of the campus

In 1891, the Board of Regents authorized the establishment of a sixth normal school to serve the northern half of the state. Many cities wished to have the normal school, but the ultimate contenders were Stevens Point and Wausau. On July 21, 1893, at 3 p.m. the Board of Regents voted for the site. Shortly after midnight, a telegram from Madison confirmed that Stevens Point was the home of the new normal school.

After securing land and funding from the City of Stevens Point and Portage County and winning the right to host the new normal school, Stevens Point Normal School opened on September 17, 1894, with 201 students. In addition to teacher preparation, "domestic science" (home economics) and conservation education were offered; the latter formed the basis for the College of Natural Resources.

The board of regents selected Theron B. Pray as the first president of the university and allowed the hiring of 12 more faculty members.

=== 20th century to present ===
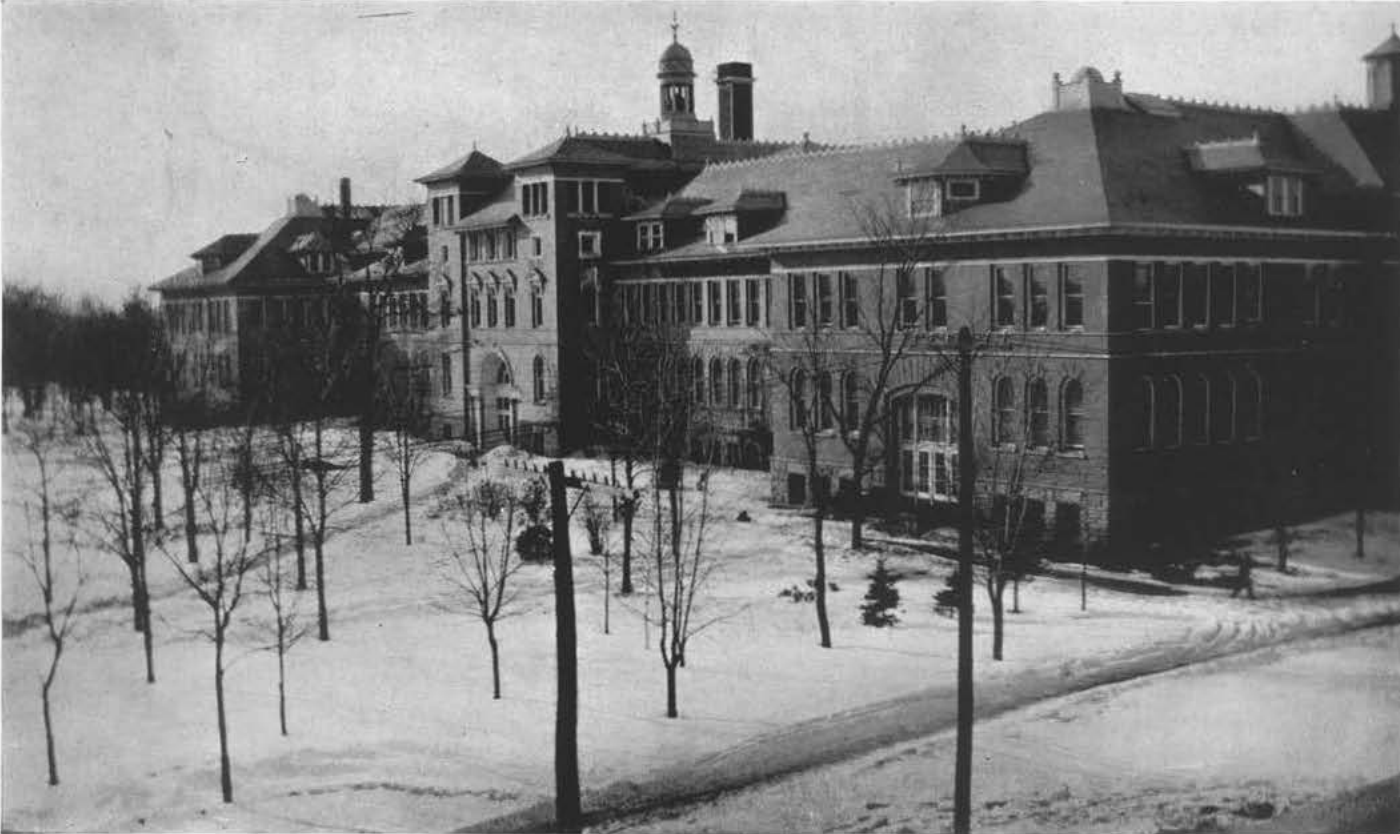
Old Main as seen in 1917 with both wings added

Early 20th-century enrollment growth spurred campus expansion, including west and east wings added to Old Main in 1901 and 1914 respectively, and a domestic science cottage named Sims Cottage in 1915. In 1913, the state authorized the first dormitory in the normal school system, Nelson Hall, completed in 1915. The Orthman Rural Demonstration School was built in 1923, and a training school, now the Communication Arts Center, was approved in 1926. The domestic science cottage and the rural demonstration school were both demolished in the 1950s.

In 1927, Stevens Point Normal School became Central State Teachers College, offering four-year degrees. Peter J. Michelsen developed the music program starting in 1931, with the first bachelor of music degree in the state college system approved in 1959. In 1946, a conservation education major, the first in the U.S., was established which eventually developed into the College of Natural Resources.

When post-World War II enrollment became less centered on teacher training and more focused on liberal arts education, the Wisconsin State Legislature intervened, changing the school's name in 1951 to Wisconsin State College–Stevens Point with the authority to grant bachelor of arts and bachelor of science degrees. In the same year, the College of Letters and Science was established.

The 1950s and 1960s saw significant construction due to increased enrollment, and the institution became Wisconsin State University–Stevens Point in 1964, offering graduate degrees, with the College of Fine Arts also established that year. In 1967, a student "beer riot" occurred in response to potential legal drinking age changes, which included a bonfire downtown and looting of a beer truck. In 1968, the Northwoods battalion ROTC unit was formed. In 1969, an International Studies program, the first in the university system, was established. Student protests against the Vietnam War included a Nelson Hall "sit-in" in 1970. The College of Natural Resources and the College of Professional Studies were also created in 1970. In 1971, the school became part of the University of Wisconsin system, adopting its current name.

In 1974, Lee S. Dreyfus began his tenure as chancellor, a position he held until his election as Wisconsin's governor, an honor he celebrated with his 1979 inauguration on Old Main's front lawn. The university expanded its reach in 1985 with the establishment of the Treehaven field station. A unique moment in the campus's history occurred in 1995, when the Jacksonville Jaguars, as part of the 'Cheese League', conducted their training camp on campus.

As the 21st century approached, the university demonstrated a growing commitment to environmental stewardship, forming a sustainability task force in 2007 with the goal of achieving carbon neutrality. However, the university also faced challenges, including the 2009 resignation of Chancellor Linda Bunnell following a student vote of no-confidence stemming from a reported automobile accident and allegations of driving under the influence. More recently, in 2022, the university's commitment to ecological education was bolstered by the donation of an 11-acre property, which became the Bob Engelhard Restoration Ecology Field Laboratory.

=== Chancellors and presidents ===
List of UWSP's chancellors and presidents:

Presidents and Chancellors of the University of Wisconsin–Stevens Point since founding in 1894
Order	Term start	Term end	President/Chancellor	Notes
1	1894	1906	Theron B. Pray	
2	1906	1926	John F. Sims	
3	1926	1930	Robert D. Baldwin	
4	1930	1938	Frank S. Hyer	
5	1938	1939	Phillip H. Falk	
6	1939	1940	Ernest T. Smith	
7	1940	1962	William C. Hansen	
8	1962	1967	James H. Albertson	
9	1967	1967	Gordon Haferbecker	
10	1967	1977	Lee S. Dreyfus	Was the first Chancellor of UWSP after the merge of the UW System in 1971.
11	1977	1979	John B. Ellery	
12	1979	1989	Phillip Marshall	
13	1989	1989	Howard Thoyre	
14	1989	1995	Keith R. Sanders	
15	1995	1996	Howard Thoyre	
16	1996	2003	Tom George	
17	2003	2004	Virginia Helm	
18	2004	2009	Linda Bunnell	
19	2009	2010	Mark Nook	
20	2010	2021	Bernie Patterson	
21	2021	2025	Thomas J. Gibson	
22	2025	2026	Pratima Gandhi	
23	2026	Present	Robert Brinkmann	

== Campus ==
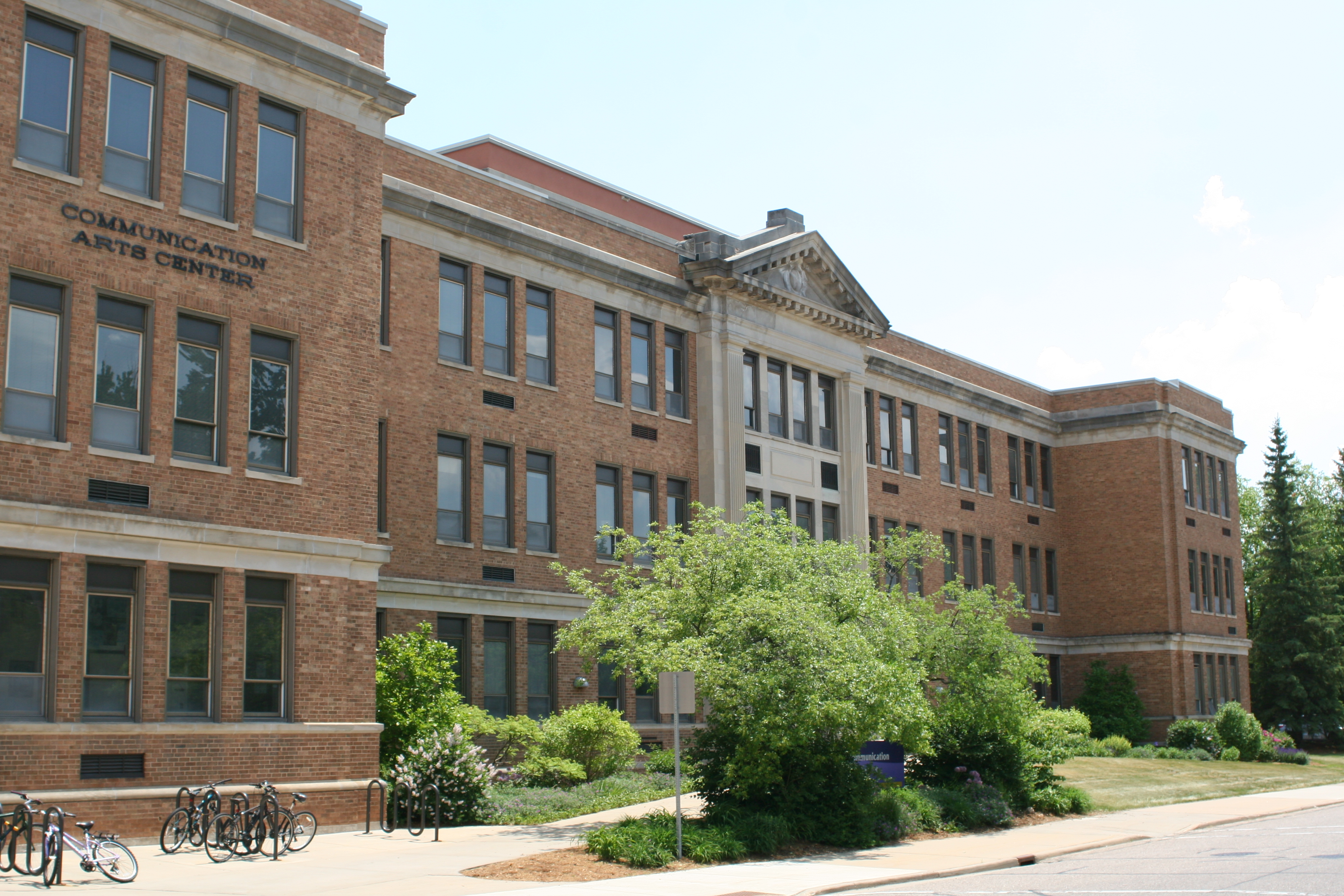
The Communication Arts Center, the headquarters for the WWSP-FM trivia contest, Pointer Studios, and the Pointer Newspaper.

The Main Campus of the university is in Stevens Point, Wisconsin, a block north of State Route 66 and southwest of Interstate 39/U.S. Route 51. It is a 406-acre (164 ha) campus with 43 buildings, including a 280-acre (113 ha) nature preserve and 25-acre (10.1 ha) lake.

The Greek community on campus consists of four sororities and four fraternities. All the Greek organizations meet and collaborate as one, known as the Inter-Greek Council. The sororities on campus are Delta Phi Epsilon, Gamma Phi Delta Sorority, Phi Omega, and Sigma Delta Rho. The fraternities on campus are Phi Sigma Phi, Sigma Tau Gamma, Phi Mu Alpha Sinfonia, and Theta Xi.

The 280-acre Schmeeckle Reserve, a nature reserve, is on campus and has 5 miles of trails and a 24-acre man made lake, Lake Joanis. It is managed by the College of Natural Resources.

Housed within the Chemistry Biology Building is a Tropical Conservatory which is home to 400 different species and cultivars from Central and South America, Africa, Asia and the Pacific islands.

UW-Stevens Point also has two additional campuses. UW-Stevens Point at Wausau and UW-Stevens Point at Marshfield. The UW-Stevens Point at Marshfield campus was formed in 1963 and is 114-acres in a quiet residential area. The UW-Stevens Point at Wausau campus was formed in 1933 and is located in an urban area.

=== Satellite locations ===
The university has three off-site field stations: Central Wisconsin Environmental Station (CWES) at Amherst Junction, Treehaven near Tomahawk, and the Northern Aquaculture Demonstration Facility at Bayfield. CWES is on 200 acres near Sunset Lake, 17 miles east of Stevens Point. Treehaven is between Tomahawk and Rhinelander, Wisconsin on 1,400 acres. The Northern Aquaculture Demonstration Facility is at 36445 State Highway 13, 1.5 miles west of Red Cliff on Highway 13, near Lake Superior.

=== Old Main ===
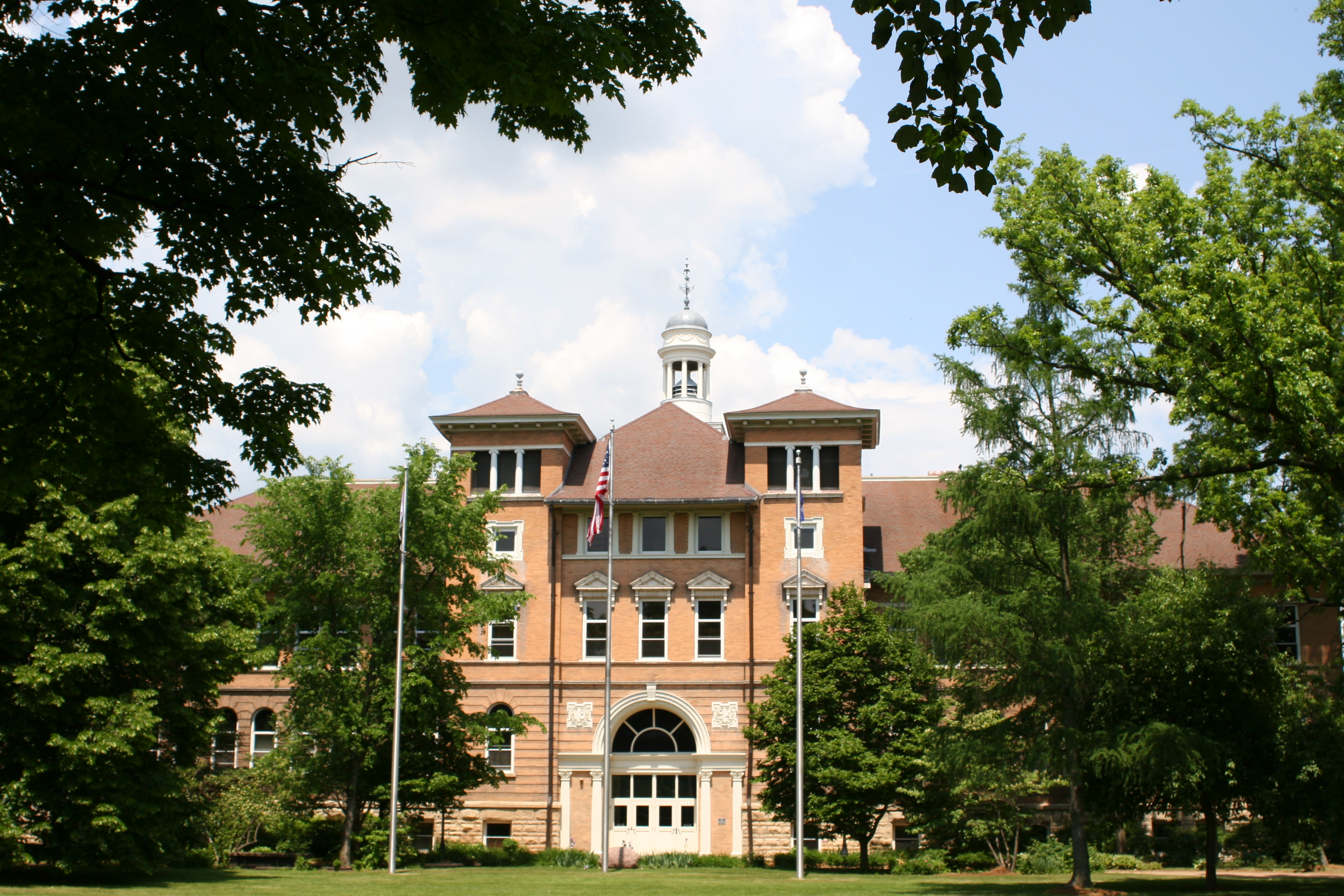
Old Main is the icon of the campus. It is the oldest building on campus, constructed in 1894. It is listed on the National Register of Historic Places.

The iconic cupola atop the "Old Main" building is the current logo for the university. Built in 1894, it was the first building on campus. It was designed by Dwight H. Perkins of Perkins and Selby of Chicago in the Renaissance Revival Style, and is listed on the National Register of Historic Places. It currently houses University Administration.

In 1901, a west wing was added to the building to house home economics, the Rural Education Department, and the Music Department. In 1914, an east wing was added to the building to relocate home economics. In 1971, the university's Bureau of Facilities Management deemed Old Main as "obsolete", recommending its demolition. There were multiple efforts to save the building from demolition, including listing Old Main on the National Register of Historic Places in 1976. In 1979 the university was awarded funds to modernize the interior and remove both the east and west wings, thus saving Old Main. A formal rededication was held in October 1980.

=== Nelson Hall ===
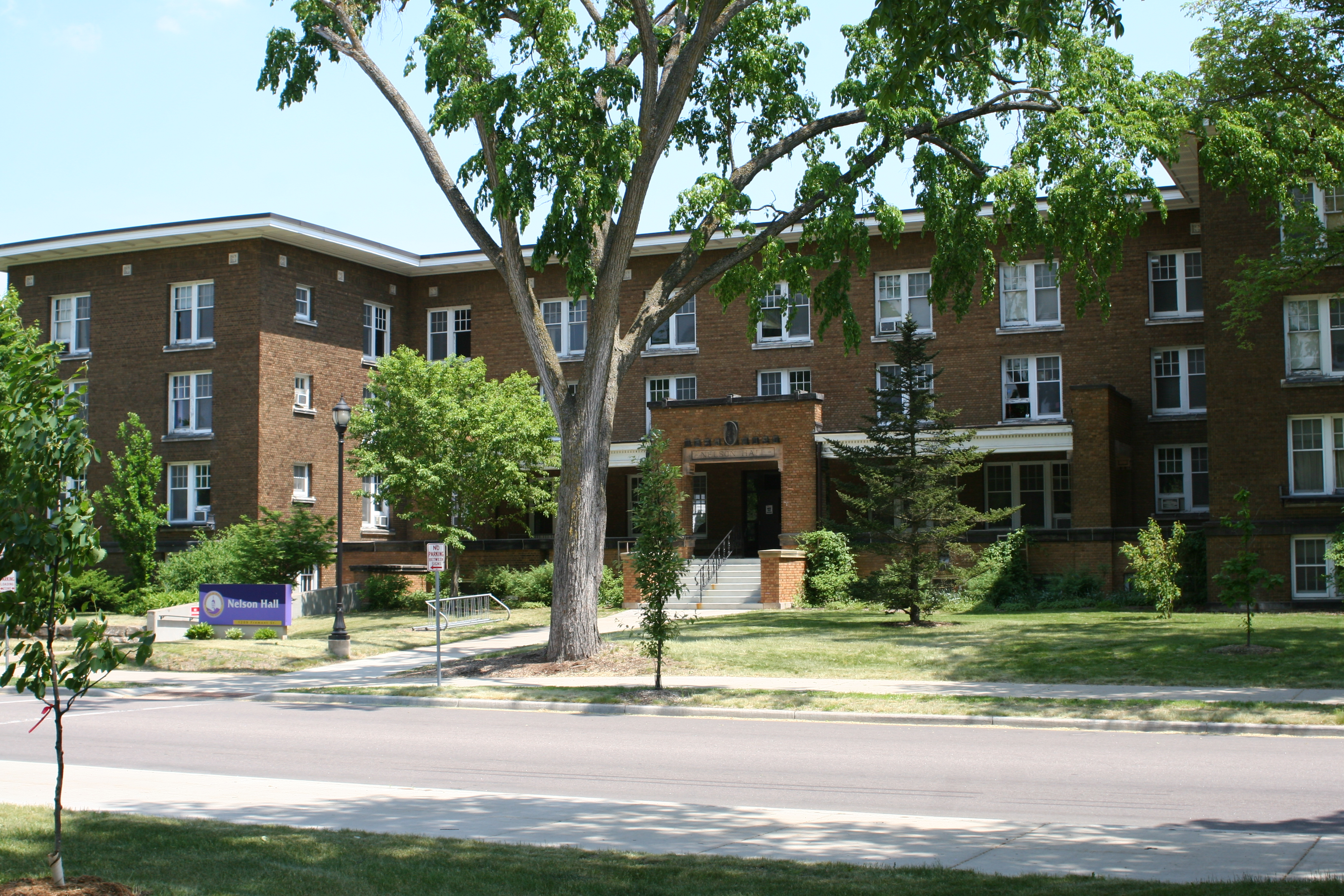
Nelson Hall, constructed in 1915, is the second oldest building on campus. It is listed on the National Register of Historic Places.

Nelson Hall is the third oldest building on campus and the second oldest still standing. Built in 1915 and designed by the Milwaukee firm of Henry Van Ryn and Gerrit de Gellecke, it is listed on the National Register of Historic Places. Since it was built, the residence has housed women students, the Student Army Training Corps organizing for World War I, trainees for World War II and the ROTC. Nelson Hall remains as the oldest existing dormitory building of the former State Normal School system. Nelson Hall, as of 2020 has been the home of the Closet and the Backpack for students to access free clothing, cookware and school supplies. Since UWSP has a goal of being more sustainable this is also a donation center for people to recycle the clothing, cookware and school supplies that they no longer have use for. https://www.uwsp.edu/campus-life/sustainability/

Nelson Hall is named for George B. Nelson who, at the time, was a regent of the State Normal School System. Nelson fought with legislators who were opposed to spending the $100,000 to build the hall.

=== Museums ===
The UW-Stevens Point campus is home to the Olson Museum of Natural History. The earliest mention of a museum at UWSP goes back to the founding of the campus and the construction of the Normal School Old Main Building in 1894. Currently, the museum is divided into 10 areas of natural history: Anthropology, Botany, Entomology, Geology, Herpetology, Ichthyology, Mammalogy, Ornithology, Parasitology, and Paleontology. A Noteworthy specimen includes the only Wisconsin fossil of the extinct elk-moose (Cervalces scotii) found by a farmer in Bevent. In 2024, the museum was renamed the Olson Museum of Natural History in honor of Don and Judi Olson, an alumni couple who donated $450,000 to the museum.

Many of UW-Stevens Point's collections are among the most heavily utilized teaching and research collections in the state.

The campus also holds the Edna Carlsten Art Gallery which exhibits local, national, and international artists, hosts community events, and contributes to overseeing and maintaining a permanent collection of fine art and design works.

=== Native American history ===
The UW-Stevens Point campus currently sits atop a Native American burial site. Recently, historic research showed the campus encompasses what was at one point a Native American camp and burial ground of the Ho-Chunk, Menominee, Ojibwe and Potawatomi. In the 1860s, scarlet fever devastated a diverse group of Native Americans who were living outside of Stevens Point after being forced out of their ancestral homelands by settlement. The deceased were buried on this site. A mural was dedicated on May 5, 2023, that memorializes Native Americans buried on campus as well as the annual Pow Wow.

== Academics ==
The University of Wisconsin–Stevens Point offers over 200 undergraduate programs in 125 majors and 89 minors. These programs are housed within five colleges:

- College of Fine Arts and Communication, which includes opportunities in the visual and performing arts;
- College of Letters and Science, which includes disciplines in the natural and social sciences, mathematics, computing and humanities;
- College of Natural Resources, with disciplines such as forestry and wildlife ecology; and
- College of Professional Studies, featuring business and economics, health-related fields and the School of Education
- University College, which houses the Academic and Career Advising Center, Critical Thinking Center, Disability Resource Center, General Education Program, Office of International Education, Tutoring-Learning Center, University Honors Program and University Library.

The University of Wisconsin–Stevens Point also offers 25 graduate programs with 21 masters degrees, and 4 doctoral degrees.

For 2026, U.S. News & World Report ranked UW-Stevens Point 54th among regional universities in the Midwestern United States and 15th in public regional universities in the Midwestern United States.

=== Research ===
UWSP is a Research Colleges and Universities (RCU) university, meaning it on average spends at least $2.5 million on research & development per year. UWSP secured $6.89 million in new research funding in 2024, most of which funded research projects in the College of Letters and Science and the College of Natural Resources. Both the College of Letters and Science and the College of Natural Resources hold annual research symposiums on campus.

== Student life ==
UW-Stevens Point is home to 13 residence halls which are divided into three quads. The first quad established at the university was the Allen Quad, which consists of May Roach, Pray-Sims, Smith, and Hyer Halls, as well as the Suites@201. The Allen Residence Center is located near the Allen quad and originally served as the university's first dining hall. The Allen quad has two halls for upperclassmen: the Suites@201 and Hyer Hall. The Suites@201 is an apartment-style residence hall and Hyer Hall is available to students who are 21 years of age or older prior to the start of the fall semester.

North DeBot Quad consists of Burroughs, Knutzen, Thomson, and Watson Halls. South DeBot Quad consists of Baldwin, Hansen, Neale, and Steiner Halls. The North DeBot and South DeBot quads are divided by the DeBot Dining Center which serves as the main dining center on campus.

WWSP-FM is the University of Wisconsin–Stevens Point's alternative radio station. Operating at 30,000 watts, WWSP broadcasts commercial free on 89.9FM year-round. '90FM' is the largest student-run radio station in the Midwest; the station hosts the world's largest trivia contest, which was founded in 1969 and has since become a tradition for the university and the community.

== Athletics ==
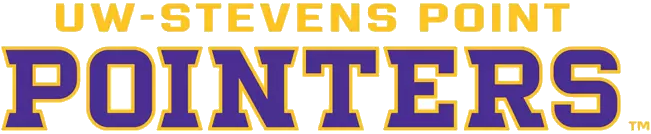
UWSP athletics wordmark

Student athletes in 24 sports at UW-Stevens Point participate in the NCAA Division III. The teams are members of the Wisconsin Intercollegiate Athletic Conference (WIAC). The mascot of UW-Stevens Point is Stevie Pointer.

The university fields athletics teams in baseball, basketball, cross country, football, golf, ice hockey, lacrosse (women's only), soccer, softball, swimming and diving, tennis, track and field, volleyball, and wrestling.

== Notable alumni ==
- Andrea Anders, television actress
- Margaret Ashmun, teacher and writer
- Jenny Baeseman, polar researcher
- James Baumgart, politician
- Kirk Baumgartner, football player
- Tim Bedore, comedian
- Kathi Bennett, women's head basketball coach
- Bob Bostad, football coach
- Carlos Castillo-Chavez, professor of mathematics and biology
- Arthur J. Crowns, politician
- Dorothy Davids, American educator, educational services administrator, and Native American and women's rights activist
- Steven E. Day, U.S. Coast Guard Rear Admiral
- Jake Dickert, football coach
- Michael Dombeck, former U.S. Forest Service Chief
- Lawrence Eagleburger, former U.S. Secretary of State (attended)
- R. Michael Ferrall, politician
- J. P. Feyereisen, baseball player
- Ted Fritsch, football player
- Arnold Gesell, American psychologist
- Herbert J. Grover, educator and politician
- William C. Hansen, educator and politician
- David Helbach, politician
- Brian Idalski, Olympic ice hockey coach
- Kathy Kinney, television actress
- Dale Klapmeier, Cirrus Aircraft co-founder and former CEO
- Greg Koch, guitarist
- Anton C. Krembs, politician
- Clint Kriewaldt, football player
- Melvin Laird, former U.S. Secretary of Defense (attended)
- Henry Leck, choral clinician and professor of music
- John A. List, economist
- Edwin A. Loberg, U.S. Air Force Officer
- Max Maxfield, politician
- Scott May, baseball player
- Pete McCann, guitarist
- Mark Michie, U.S. National Guard Brigadier General
- Scott D. Berrier, U.S. Army Lieutenant General
- Lewis T. Mittness, politician
- H. J. Mortensen, politician
- William Murat, politician
- Michael P. Nelson, professor of environmental philosophy and ethics
- John M. Noel, entrepreneur and philanthropist
- Laura Osnes, actress (attended)
- Jim Pekol, musician
- Terry Porter, basketball player and coach
- Ryan Ramczyk, football player
- Bary Rose, football player
- Patrick Rothfuss, author
- Marlin D. Schneider, politician and teacher, longest serving member of the Wisconsin State Assembly, 1971-2011
- Lolita Schneiders, politician
- Donna J. Seidel, politician
- Albert D. Shimek, politician
- Brad Soderberg, men's head basketball coach
- Mary Lou E. Van Dreel, politician
- Daniel P. Vrakas, politician
- Jordan Zimmermann, baseball player

== Notable faculty ==
- Dick Bennett (athletics department, 1976–1985), head basketball coach; later coached at the University of Wisconsin and Washington State University
- J. Baird Callicott (philosophy department, 1965–1994), Distinguished Research Professor at the University of North Texas; co-founder of the academic environmental philosophy and ethics discipline
- Louie Crew, English professor at Rutgers University
- George Corneal, basketball, track and football coach
- Lee Sherman Dreyfus (chancellor, 1967–1978), 40th Governor of Wisconsin
- Eddie Kotal, head football, basketball, track and field, and boxing coach; former NFL player
- Michael P. Nelson (philosophy department, 1992–2004), environmental philosophy and ethics professor at Oregon State University; co-founder and director of the Conservation Ethics Group
- Helen Parkhurst (director of the Department for the Training of Primary Teachers, 1913–1915), originator of the Dalton Plan; known as "one of only 100 great educators for all time," with her name being among Socrates and Maria Montessori
- Benjamin Percy, writer of short stories, essays, comics, and screenplays
- Jon H. Roberts, historian and professor of history (later taught at Boston University ) author of Darwinism and the Divine in America: Protestant Intellectuals and Organic Evolution, 1859–1900
- Patrick Rothfuss, writer of epic fantasy; books include The Name of the Wind, which won the 2007 Quill Award, and its sequel, The Wise Man's Fear, which topped The New York Times Best Seller list
