= Evening Shade School District =

Defunct school district in Arkansas, United States

Evening Shade School District No. 24

Location
- Evening Shade, Arkansas United States

District information
- Grades: K-12
- Closed: July 1, 2004

Evening Shade School District No. 24 was a school district headquartered in Evening Shade, Arkansas. It had elementary (K-4) and high school (5-12) divisions.

On July 1, 2004, it was annexed into the Cave City School District.
