= Mark Michie =

American military personnel

Mark Michie is a brigadier general in the Wisconsin Army National Guard.

== Biography ==
Michie graduated from the University of Wisconsin–Stevens Point in 1985. He is a resident of Harshaw, Wisconsin.

== Career ==
Michie enlisted in the Wisconsin Army National Guard in September 1980. He was commissioned an officer in 1983. Later, he was deployed to serve in the Iraq War.

In 2007, Michie graduated from the United States Army War College. The following year, he assumed command of the 157th Maneuver Enhancement Brigade. He became Land Component Commander in 2012 and was promoted to brigadier general in 2013.

Awards Michie has received include the Bronze Star Medal, the Meritorious Service Medal, the Army Commendation Medal, the Army Achievement Medal, the Army Reserve Components Achievement Medal, the National Defense Service Medal, the Iraq Campaign Medal, the Global War on Terrorism Service Medal, the Humanitarian Service Medal and the Armed Forces Reserve Medal.
