= 157th Maneuver Enhancement Brigade =

Formation of the Wisconsin Army National Guard

157th Maneuver Enhancement Brigade 57th Field Artillery Brigade
- 157th Maneuver Enhancement Brigade shoulder sleeve insignia
- Active: 1917–1967; 1978–2008; 2008-present
- Country: United States
- Branch: United States Army National Guard
- Type: Maneuver Enhancement Brigade
- Role: Combat Support
- Part of: Wisconsin Army National Guard
- Garrison/HQ: Wisconsin National Guard Armory - Milwaukee
- Nickname: "Iron Brigade"
- Engagements: World War I

Insignia
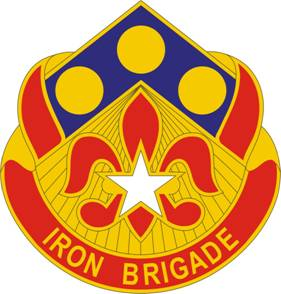
- Distinctive Unit Insignia

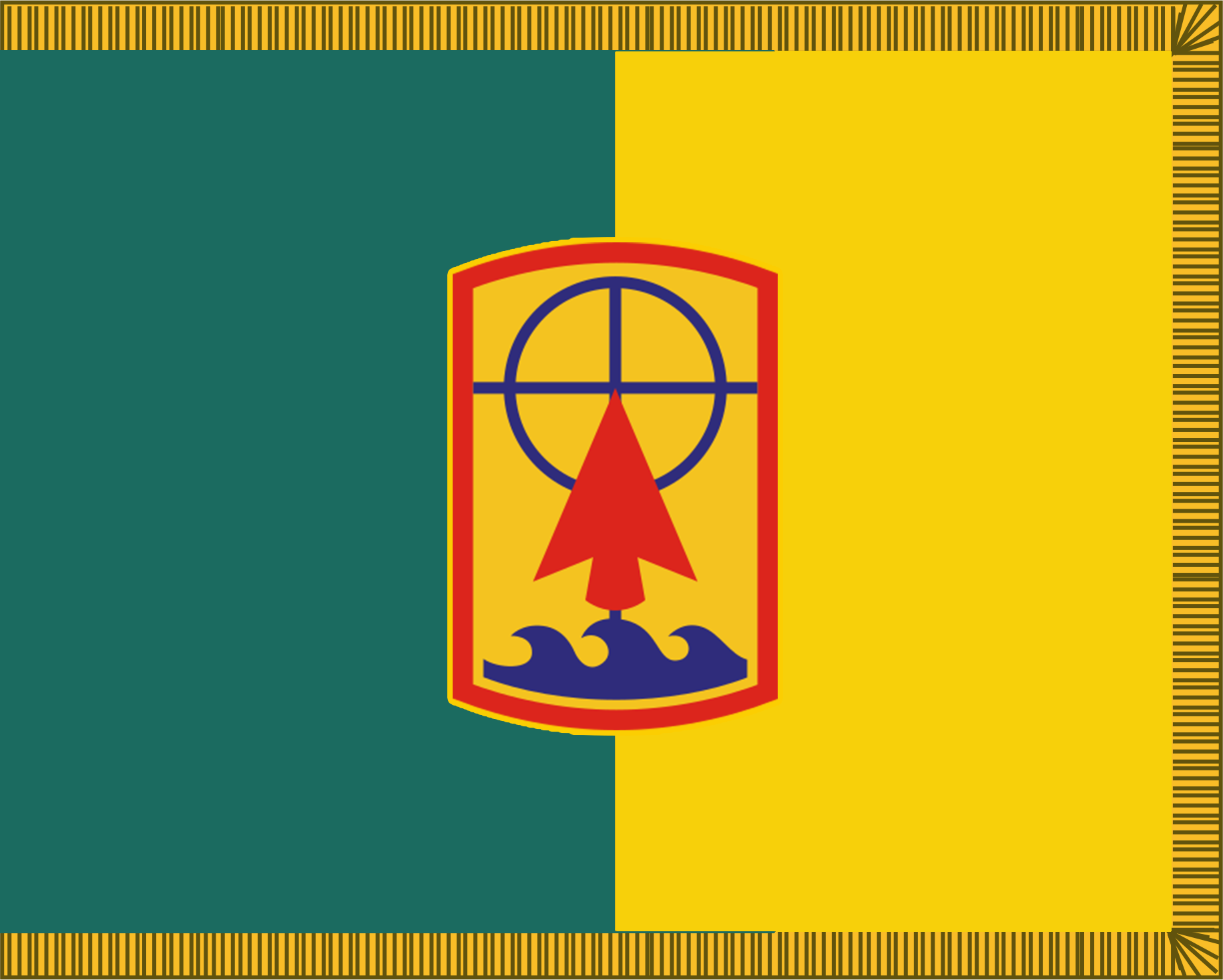
- 157th Maneuver Enhancement Brigade Flag

The 157th Maneuver Enhancement Brigade, also known as the Iron Brigade, is based out of Milwaukee, Wisconsin. It was formerly known as the 57th Field Artillery Brigade, at which time its subordinate organizations included the 1st Battalion, 126th Field Artillery Regiment and the 1st Battalion, 121st Field Artillery Regiment from the Wisconsin Army National Guard, plus the 1st Battalion, 182nd Field Artillery Regiment of the Michigan Army National Guard. Not to be confused with the famous "Iron Brigade" of the Civil War, its nickname was traditionally given to crack artillery units in the Civil War. It was during World War I that the 57th Field Artillery Brigade earned its nickname as it spent many hours at the front and fired more artillery rounds than any brigade in the American Army.

== History ==
=== 20th century ===
==== World War I era ====
Part of the 32nd Infantry Division, the unit was organized under War Department orders of 18 July 1917, from National Guard troops from Wisconsin and Michigan. Brigadier General William G. Haan, while acting as Division Commander, was also in command of the 57th Field Artillery Brigade. The 119th Field Artillery, composed largely of Michigan artillery and cavalry troops, was commanded by Major Chester B. McCormick, later promoted to the rank of colonel. The 120th Field Artillery was made up almost entirely from troops of the 1st Wisconsin Cavalry, and the commanding officer of the latter organization. Colonel Carl Penner, continued in command. The 1st Wisconsin Field Artillery Regiment became the 121st Field Artillery, the heavy artillery regiment of the 57th Field Artillery Brigade. The Commanding Officer of the Wisconsin Artillery, Colonel Philip C. Westfahl, became Commander of the new regiment.

==== World War II service ====
In 1940, President Franklin Roosevelt established the Mojave Anti-Aircraft Range, a military reservation of approximately 1,000 square miles (2,600 km^{2}) in the area of the present Fort Irwin. In 1942, the Mojave Anti-Aircraft Range was renamed Camp Irwin, in honor of Maj. Gen. George LeRoy Irwin, commander of the 57th Field Artillery Brigade during World War I. Two years later, Camp Irwin was deactivated and placed on surplus status.

==== Kosovo service ====
Starting in November 2011, 157th MEB deployed to Kosovo as the headquarters of Multi-National Battle Group-East in support of the NATO KFOR (Kosovo Forces) mission. The 157 returned successfully.

=== 21st century ===
==== Iraq service ====
On 22 April 2006 the 1-121st FA left for Camp Shelby in Mississippi for two months for pre-mobilization training. After their training concluded the 1-121st FA was then deployed to Kuwait and portions of Iraq. During their deployment two battalion soldiers were killed in action. Cpl. Steven Castner died 24 July 2006 after a roadside bomb attack hit his convoy near Tallil, Iraq.

==== Afghanistan service ====
The 951st Engineer Company of the 724th Engineer Battalion deployed to Afghanistan in February 2009 as part of the 276th Engineer Battalion, Virginia Army National Guard, to provide route clearance operations for Coalition forces. During this deployment the 276th completed 1090 missions and received the Valorous Unit Award while sustaining the loss of only one soldier to enemy fire. Sgt. Ryan C. Adams of 3rd Platoon, 951st Engineer Company, died on 2 October from wounds sustained from an RPG attack on his vehicle.

The 229th Engineer Company of the 724th Engineer Battalion deployed to Southern Afghanistan in September 2012, and expanded mobility for American and Afghan forces through numerous route improvement projects and base expansions.

On 16 January 2013, Bravo Battery of the 121st FA deployed to Afghanistan.

On 17 May 2014, Alpha Battery of the 1-121 FA deployed overseas to Afghanistan in support of coalition forces.

==== Modern era redesignation ====
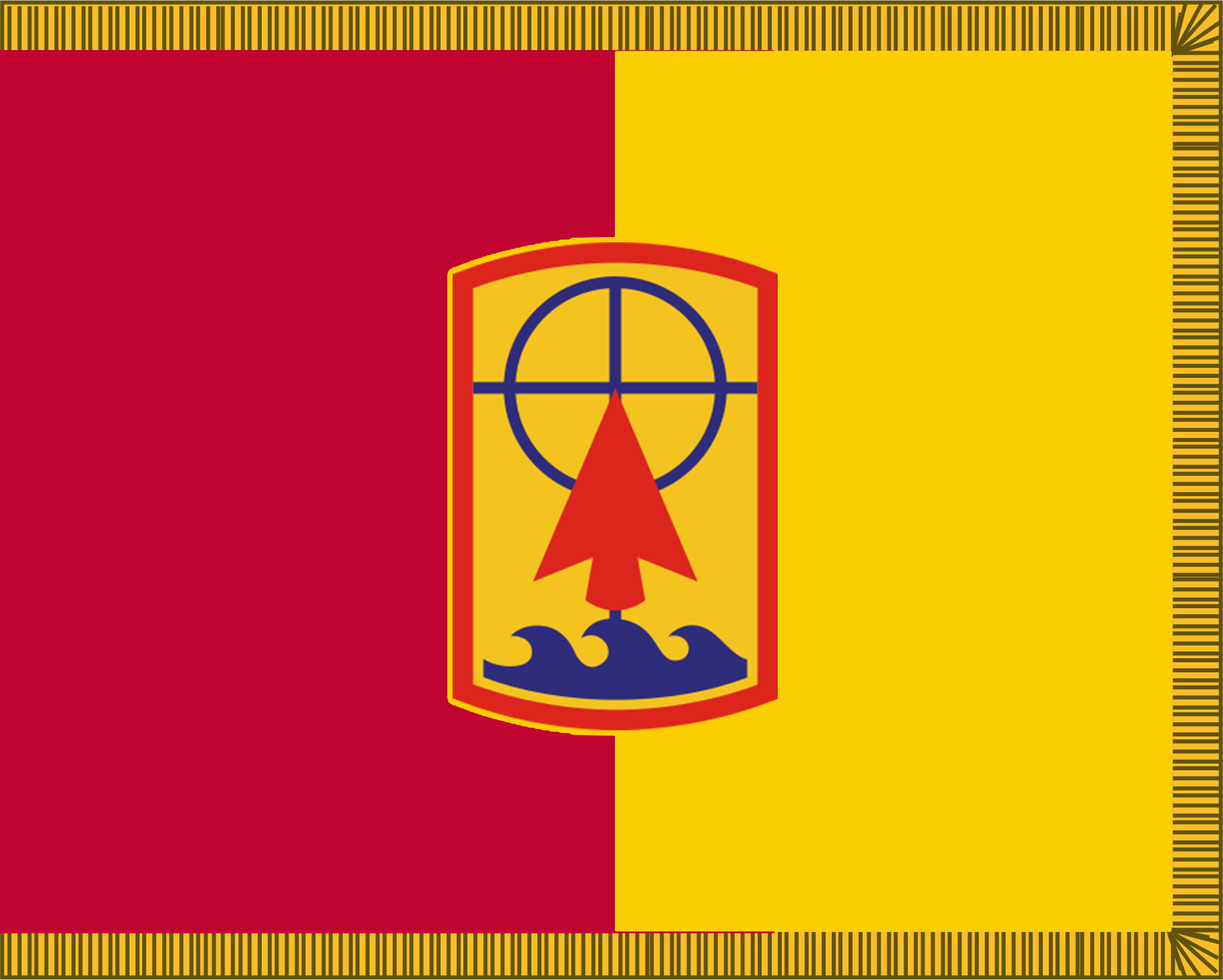
57th Field Artillery Brigade Flag

During the early 1960s, the unit was assigned the Little John. On 30 December 1967, the 32nd Infantry Division was deactivated and National Guard units realigned. Along with the 32nd Infantry Division, the 32nd Infantry Division Artillery was redesignated as the 257th Field Artillery Group. On 30 September 1978, the 257th Field Artillery Group was redesignated as the 57th Field Artillery Brigade; a designation which had previously existed until the 32nd Division was reorganized into the then-standard triangular (three regiment) division in 1942 and the 32nd Division Artillery created.

As a part of the strategic transformation, the 57th Field Artillery Brigade was transformed from a Field Artillery Brigade to the 157th Maneuver Enhancement Brigade (MEB).

The previous HHB, 57th Field Artillery Brigade transformed into HHC, 157th MEB. This unit almost doubled in size while the headquarters remained in Milwaukee, Wisconsin. This is a newly designed, multifunctional command and control organization.

Unit Mission: The Maneuver Enhancement Brigade (MEB) enables, enhances, and protects the operational and tactical freedom of action of the support force. It received and integrates mission tailored forces to Brigade Combat Teams (BCT) and support brigades. It commands and controls forces necessary to conduct security and functional operations in a designated area of operations (AO) in order to enable force application, focused logistics, battle space awareness, and protection.

A new unit, 357th Network Support Company (NSC), is headquartered in Two Rivers, Wisconsin. The primary mission for the NSC is to provide communication support to all units within the CSB. This unit mainly comprised the previous Detachment 1 HHB 57th FA Brigade.

The 1st Battalion, 126th Field Artillery Regiment (Paladin) will transform into the 257th Brigade Support Battalion (BSB) and will be headquartered in Oak Creek, WI. The primary mission for the BSB is to provide service support to all assigned units within the CSB. The BSB has a Distribution Company in Whitewater and a Maintenance Company in Kenosha, Wisconsin.

A new unit, the 457th Chemical Company, is headquartered in Burlington, Wisconsin. Their mission is to provide chemical detection and decontamination for the CSB.

The 1st Battalion, 121st Field Artillery Regiment, which maintains Multiple Launch Rocket Systems, (MLRS) will convert to High Mobility Artillery Rocket System (HIMARS), with their headquarters located in Milwaukee, WI, and their firing batteries located in Racine (Battery A), Plymouth (Battery B), and Sussex (Battery C).

A new unit, 108th Forward Support Company (FSC), to be headquartered in Sussex, WI, was formed by the direct support MLRS maintenance team (Detachment 2, 107th Maintenance Company) and the service support of the 1st Battalion, 121st Field Artillery Regiment. Their primary mission is to provide service support to a HIMARS battalion.

On 3 February 2008, 0930 hours Change of Command of this Brigade was passed from Col. Dominic A. Cariello to Col. Mark Michie. Colonel Michie was assigned to Joint Forces Headquarters in Madison. He graduated from the US Army War College graduate course in Carlisle, PA, in June 2007, having spent 11 months at the Army's Senior Service College.

In March 2008, the 264th Engineer Group (Chippewa Falls, WI) cased its flag and de-activated. The 724th Engineer Battalion, along with 9 modular units, will fall under the command and control of the 157th MEB.

In 2012, 1-121 FA BN A Btry (Racine, WI) was combined with C Btry (Sussex, WI) resulting from a MTOE change changing the Battalion from 3 × 6 (six guns per Battery) to 2 × 8 (eight guns per Battery). The combining left the Racine armory vacant and kept the A Btry designation now based out of Sussex, WI.

In 2022, the 157th HSC Company deployed to Djibouti in support of Operation Enduring Freedom - Horn of Africa. They functioned as the main staff element of Combined Joint Task Force - Horn of Africa from the fall of 2022 to the summer of 2023.

== Current units ==
- Headquarters and Headquarters Company (HHC): Milwaukee
- 1st Battalion, 121st Field Artillery Regiment (HIMARS) High Mobility Artillery Rocket System (1-121st FAR)
  - Headquarters and Headquarters Battery (HHB): Oak Creek
  - Battery A: Hartford
  - Battery B: Plymouth
  - 108th Forward Support Company (108th FSC) (HIMARS) High Mobility Artillery Rocket System: Sussex
- 257th Brigade Support Battalion (257th BSB)

All units under the 257th Brigade Support Battalion except for the 32nd Military Police Company and the 357th Brigade Signal Company were disbanded effective August 2019.

  - Headquarters and Headquarters Detachment (HHD): Oak Creek (disbanded)
  - Company A (Distribution): Whitewater (disbanded)
  - Company B (Support Maintenance): Kenosha (disbanded)
- 32nd Military Police Company (32nd MPC)(-): Kenosha (formerly Milwaukee)
  - Detachment 1, 32nd Military Police Company (1-32nd MPC): Oconomowoc
- 357th Brigade Signal Company (357th BSC): Milwaukee (formerly Two Rivers)
- 724th Engineer Battalion
  - Headquarters and Headquarters Company (HHC): Chippewa Falls
  - Company A, Forward Support Company (A-FSC): Hayward
  - 106th Engineer Detachment (Quarry Team): Tomah
  - 229th Engineer Company (-) (Horizontal): Prairie du Chien
    - Detachment 1, 229th Engineer Company: Richland Center
  - 824th Engineer Detachment (Concrete): Baraboo
  - 829th Engineer Company (-) (Vertical): Chippewa Falls
    - Detachment 2, 829th Engineer Company: Ashland
  - 924th Engineer Detachment (Facilities): Chippewa Falls
  - 949th Engineer Detachment (Survey and Design Team): Chippewa Falls
  - 950th Engineer Company (-) (Clearance): Superior
    - Detachment 1, 950th Engineer Company: Spooner
  - 951st Engineer Company (-) (Wheeled Sapper): Tomahawk
    - Detachment 1, 951st Engineer Company: Rhinelander
