= Crystal River Tourist Camp =

- U.S. National Register of Historic Places
- U.S. Historic district
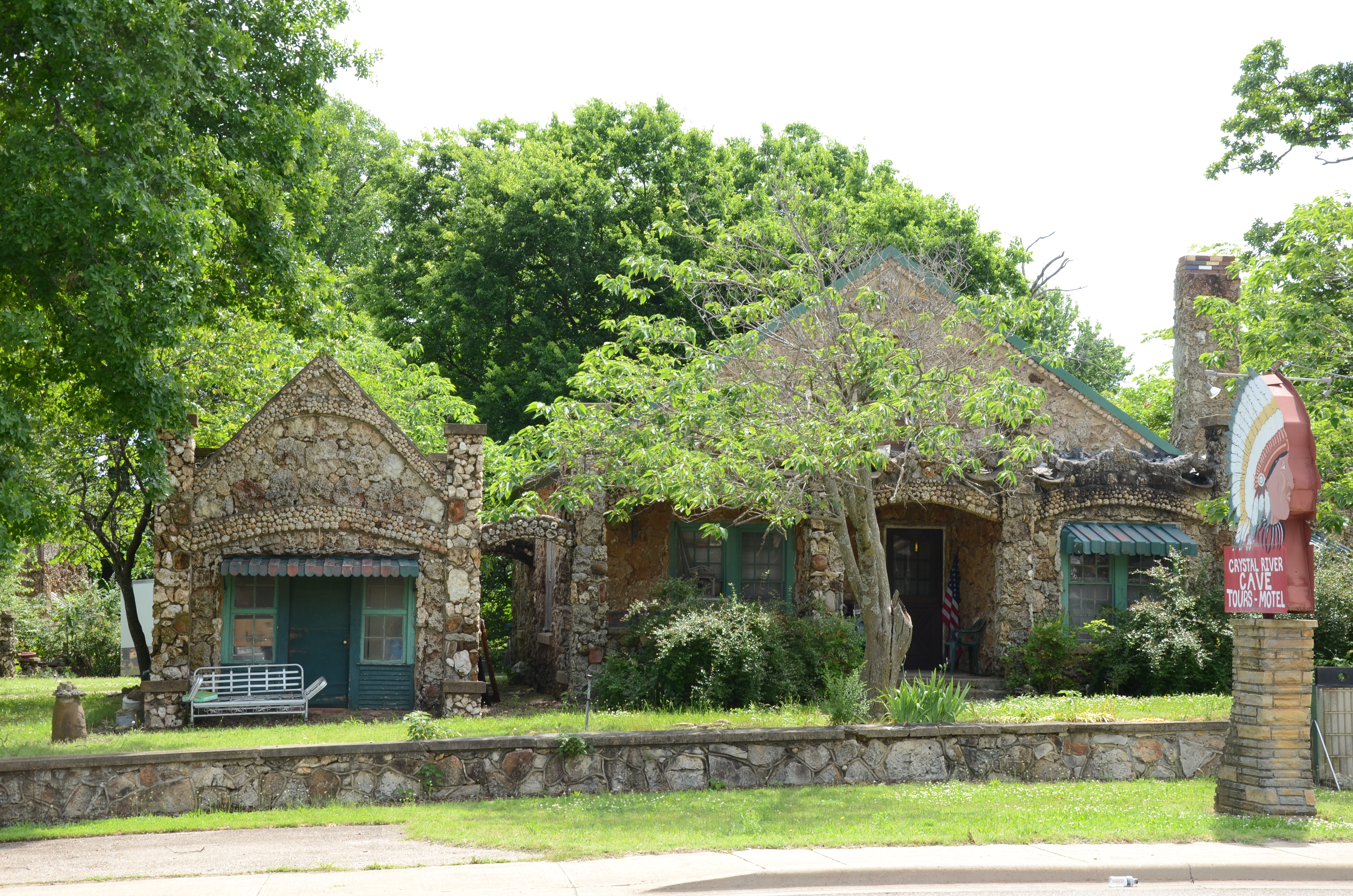

- Location within Arkansas Location within the United States
- Location: 206 North Main, Cave City, Arkansas
- Coordinates: 35°56′36″N 91°32′52″W
- Area: 2.2 acres (0.89 ha)
- Built by: Prince Matlock
- Architectural style: Ozark fieldstone
- NRHP reference No.: 91000620
- Added to NRHP: June 6, 1991

Crystal River Tourist Camp (formerly Crystal River Cave Court, today Cave Courts Motel) is a motor inn built in 1932 in Cave City, Arkansas. It is the oldest operating motor court in the state. It is built of fieldstones from the Ozarks.

== History ==
Prince Matlock built the motel in 1932 by setting thousands of rocks from the area. He used geodes and quartz as decorative rocks and created many designs of crosses and animals to add to the rock walls. Underneath the motel is a large cave for which Cave City is named. The subterranean Crystal River runs through the cave's five chambers.

== Today ==
The motel was abandoned for several years before being purchased and restored. It is now reopened as the Cave Courts Motel.

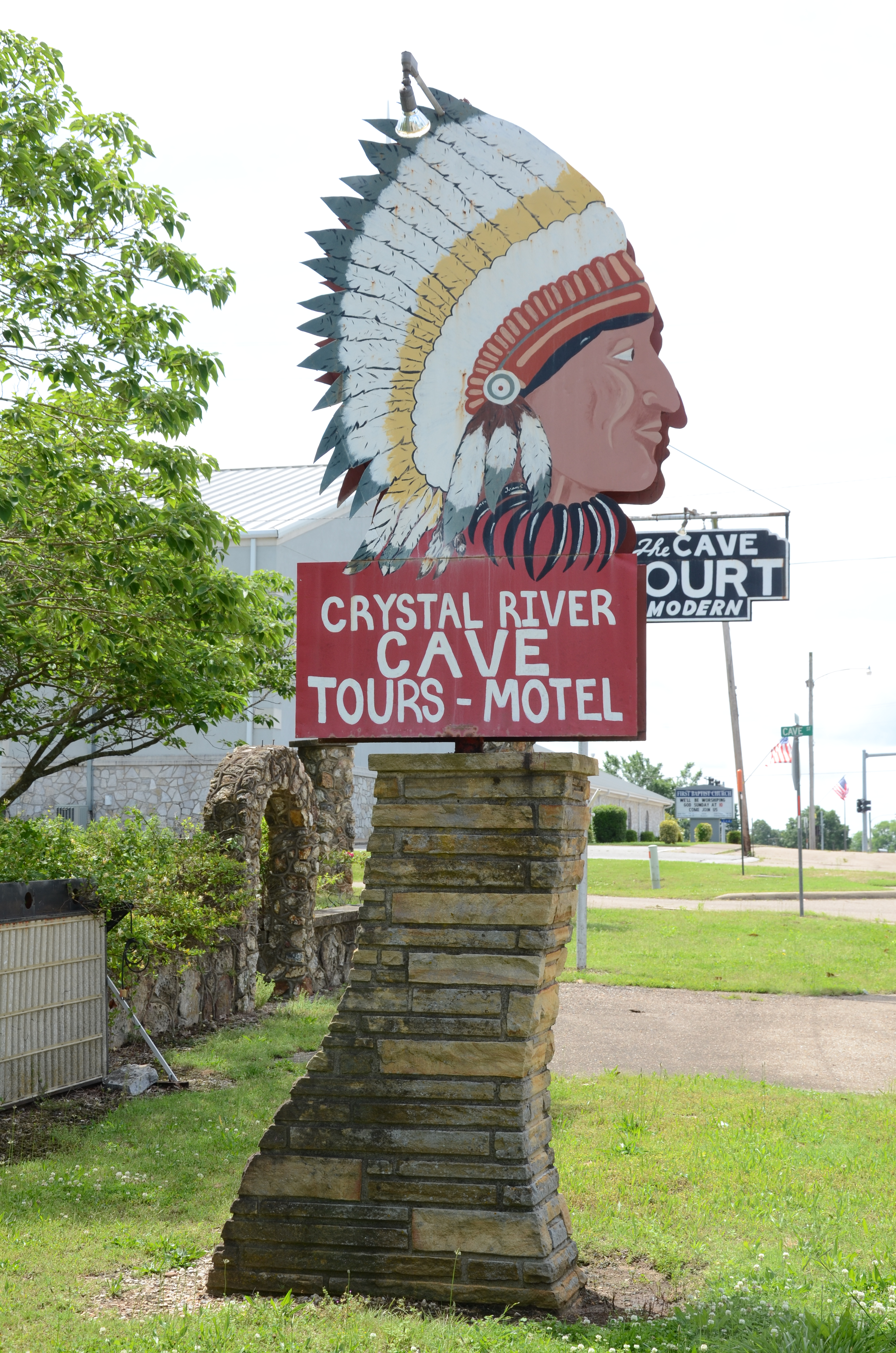
Tourist Camp sign

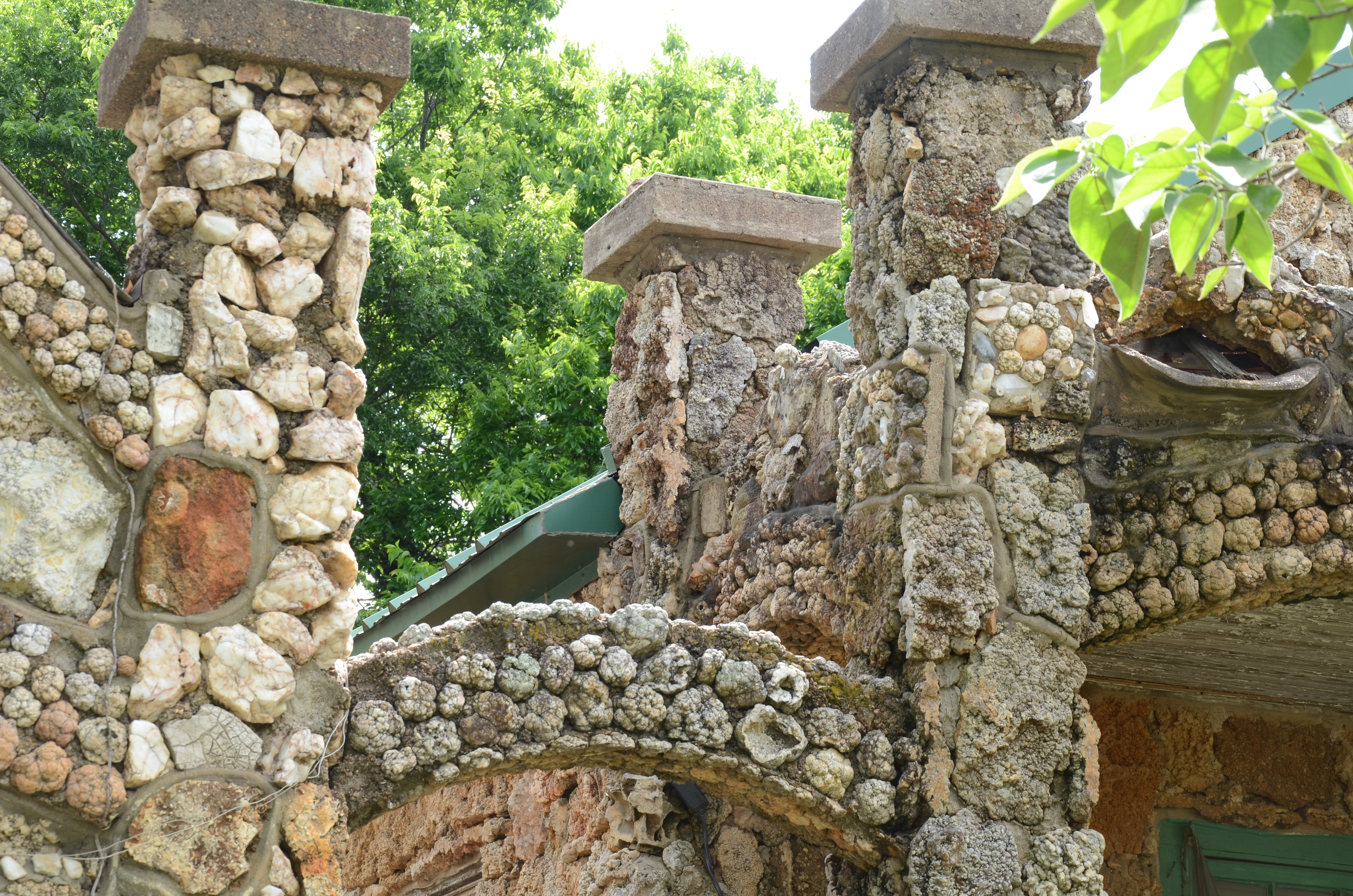
Fieldstone building detail

== See also ==
- List of motels
- National Register of Historic Places listings in Sharp County, Arkansas
