= Aboriginal Multi-Media Society =

Canadian media organization

The Aboriginal Multi-Media Society (AMMSA) is an Aboriginal publisher in Canada. AMMSA was established in 1983 under the Alberta Societies Act and launched its first publication in March 1983 – simply titled AMMSA. The name of this publication was later changed to Windspeaker in March 1986.

== Publications ==
AMMSA abandoned producing paper products, making the decision to set up a news website.

=== History ===
AMMSA published a number of monthly publications listed below

- Windspeaker – Featuring national content; publishing from March 1983 - 2016

AMMSA published the following provincial publications on a monthly basis:

- Alberta Sweetgrass – News and events from Indigenous communities in Alberta

Published monthly from December 1993 - 2016

- Ontario Birchbark - News and events from Indigenous communities in Ontario

Published monthly from January 2000 -2016

- Raven's Eye - News and events from Indigenous communities in British Columbia and the Yukon

Published monthly from March 1997 - 2016

- Saskatchewan Sage - News and events from Indigenous communities in Saskatchewan

Published monthly from October 1996 - 2016

AMMSA digitized all of the published articles in its paper products dating back to 1983 and makes them available online as part of an archive of 20,000+ news and information articles. These archives have grown to more than 30,000 articles.

== Radio ==
AMMSA operates networks of First Nations community radio stations in Alberta under the Windspeaker Radio banner: its flagship network CFWE broadcasts a mix of country music and community programming presented in Indigenous languages such as Cree and Dene. The network's studios were originally in Lac La Biche, but are now based in Edmonton. A new transmitter in Edmonton was licensed by the CRTC in 2008, and became the CFWE network's primary station when it launched in July 2009.

On June 14, 2017, the CRTC approved bids by the organization for the former Aboriginal Voices Radio Network frequencies in Calgary and Edmonton; CJWE-FM launched in 2018 with a similar format to the CFWE network, while CIWE-FM launched in Edmonton in 2021 with a free-form format.
