= XHIB-FM =

Radio station in Caborca, Sonora, Mexico

- Caborca, Sonora; Mexico
- Frequency: 89.9 FM
- Branding: La Que Manda

Programming
- Format: Regional Mexican

Ownership
- Owner: Radiovisa; (XEIB-AM, S.A. de C.V.)

History
- First air date: March 27, 1989 (concession)

Technical information
- Licensing authority: CRT
- Class: B1
- ERP: 12.36 kW
- HAAT: 16.7 m (55 ft)
- Transmitter coordinates: 30°42′30″N 112°09′03″W

Links
- Webcast: Listen live
- Website: radiovisa.tv

XHIB-FM is a radio station in Caborca, Sonora, Mexico. Broadcasting on 89.9 FM, XHIB is owned by Radiovisa and known as La Que Manda.

== History ==
XEIB-AM received its concession on March 27, 1989. It was owned by María Esther Núñez Herrera and operated as a 250-watt daytimer on 1170 kHz, with power later raised to 1,000 watts.

XEIB was cleared to move to FM in 2011.
