= XHEPC-FM =

Radio station in Zacatecas, Zacatecas

- Zacatecas, Zacatecas; Mexico
- Frequency: 89.9 FM
- Branding: Sonido Estrella

Programming
- Format: Adult contemporary

Ownership
- Owner: Sonido Estrella, S.A. de C.V.

History
- First air date: February 15, 1977; 2012 (FM)
- Former frequencies: 890 AM; 1240 AM

Technical information
- Licensing authority: CRT
- Class: B1
- ERP: 8.5 kW
- HAAT: 169.26 m (555.3 ft)
- Transmitter coordinates: 22°45′46″N 102°33′46″W

Links
- Website: sonidoestrella.net

XHEPC-FM is a radio station on 89.9 FM in Zacatecas, Zacatecas. The station is known as Sonido Estrella.

== History ==
XHEPC began as XEPC-AM 1240, which signed on February 15, 1977, and received its concession that November. It was owned by José Jesús Jaquez Acuña. XEPC would later move to 890 kHz.

The station migrated to FM in 2012. Ownership was transferred in 2015 to a company owned by nine members of the Jaquez Bermúdez family.
