= XHJQ-FM =

Radio station in Parras, Coahuila

- Parras, Coahuila; Mexico
- Frequency: 89.9 MHz
- Branding: La Explosiva

Programming
- Format: Regional Mexican

Ownership
- Owner: Radio Difusión Comercial, S.A.

History
- First air date: October 5, 1959 (concession)

Technical information
- Licensing authority: CRT
- Class: AA
- ERP: 6 kW
- HAAT: −98.1 m (−322 ft)
- Transmitter coordinates: 25°26′15″N 102°11′00″W

Links
- Webcast: laexplosivafm.hol.es

XHJQ-FM is a radio station on 89.9 FM in Parras, Coahuila. It is owned by Radio Difusión Comercial and known as La Explosiva, and carries a Regional Mexican format.

== History ==
XEJQ-AM received its concession on October 5, 1959. It was a daytimer on 1500 kHz, owned by Luis Spota Saavedra. By the 1980s, XEJQ was owned by José Rodolfo Milmo y Garza and had increased its power to 400 watts from 250.

In December 2011, it was cleared for operation on FM, allowing it to operate 24 hours a day, 7 days a week. In 2015, Milmo y Garza sold the station to Radio Difusión Comercial, S.A.
