= XHITC-FM =

Radio station in Celaya, Guanajuato, Mexico

- Celaya, Guanajuato; Mexico
- Frequency: 89.9 FM
- Branding: Radio Tecnológico de Celaya

Programming
- Format: University radio

Ownership
- Owner: Instituto Tecnológico de Celaya; (Patronato Pro-Estación Radiodifusora del Instituto Tecnológico de Celaya, A.C.)

History
- First air date: April 14, 1978 (on AM); March 22, 2014 (on FM)
- Former call signs: XEITC-AM
- Former frequencies: 1210 kHz; 1200 kHz
- Call sign meaning: Instituto Tecnológico de Celaya

Technical information
- Class: AA
- ERP: 6 kW
- Transmitter coordinates: 20°32′14.3″N 100°49′07.8″W

Links
- Webcast: Listen live
- Website: sites.google.com/itcelaya.edu.mx/xhitc/inicio

XHITC-FM is the radio station of the Instituto Tecnológico de Celaya in Celaya, Guanajuato, Mexico. It broadcasts on 89.9 FM and carries a college and cultural radio format under the name "Radio Tecnológico de Celaya".

== History ==
The Instituto Tecnológico de Celaya had lobbied for a radio station since the late 1960s, with the authorization being awarded in 1974. However, the station had no equipment. It was not until April 14, 1978, as part of ITC's 20th anniversary celebrations, when XEITC-AM 1200 hit the air for the first time. The transmitter was donated by XEFG-AM.

The station moved to 1210 kHz in the early 2000s in order to increase power from 250 watts and to avoid interference to WOAI, which broadcasts on 1200 AM in San Antonio, Texas.

However, its largest move was its migration to FM, as XHITC-FM on 89.9 MHz with 6 kW ERP. The FM station debuted on March 22, 2014.
