= CJWE-FM =

First Nations radio station in Calgary

- Calgary, Alberta; Canada
- Broadcast area: Calgary Metropolitan Region
- Frequency: 88.1 MHz (HD Radio)
- Branding: CJWE

Programming
- Format: Country/First Nations community radio
- Subchannels: HD2: CKER-FM simulcast HD3: CIWE-FM simulcast

Ownership
- Owner: Aboriginal Multi-Media Society
- Sister stations: CFWE-FM

History
- First air date: June 2018
- Call sign meaning: Disambiguation of CFWE

Technical information
- Class: C
- ERP: 100,000 watts
- HAAT: 298.6 metres (980 ft)
- Repeaters: CJWE-FM-1 103.5 Lethbridge; CJWE-FM-2 106.3 Medicine Hat

Links
- Webcast: Listen Live
- Website: cjwe.ca

CJWE-FM (88.1 MHz) is a First Nations radio station in Calgary, Alberta. Owned by the Aboriginal Multi-Media Society, it broadcasts programming targeting southern Alberta's First Nations communities, including mainstream country music, and specialty shows featuring indigenous music or presented in Indigenous languages. It is similar in format to its sister radio network CFWE, which focuses primarily on northern Alberta's First Nations communities.

In combination with the full-powered rebroadcasters CJWE-FM-1 in Lethbridge (103.5 FM), and CJWE-FM-2 in Medicine Hat (106.3 FM), CJWE has terrestrial coverage across the Treaty 7 territory.

== History ==
Following the collapse of the Aboriginal Voices Radio Network (which broadcast on 88.1 MHz in Calgary as CKAV-FM-3), the CRTC pursued new applicants for indigenous radio stations to fill its frequencies. The Aboriginal Multi-Media Society (owner of the indigenous network CFWE) was granted stations in Calgary and Edmonton.

The Calgary station, named CJWE-FM, began testing its signal in April 2018, and officially launched in June. The station features similar programming to its Edmonton-based counterpart CFWE, including a mix of mainstream country music, and specialty programs targeting Southern Alberta's indigenous communities in the Blackfoot, Cree, Nakoda, and T'suutina languages.

In December 2018, the CRTC granted approval for the AMMSA to convert the CFWE rebroadcaster CFWE-FM-2 (Piikani 147) to a rebroadcaster of CJWE, as it would broadcast content of greater relevance to the region.

In May 2022, the CRTC granted approval for the AMMSA to add a new, 100,000-watt rebroadcaster in Lethbridge on 103.5 FM, which would operate as CJWE-FM-1. The following year, the CRTC also approved a 100,000-watt rebroadcaster serving Medicine Hat on 106.3 FM; in combination with its Calgary and Lethbridge transmitters, this would give CJWE full coverage across the Treaty 7 territory. CJWE-FM-1 and CJWE-FM-2 signed on in January and March 2024 respectively.

== HD Radio ==
CJWE broadcasts in the HD Radio format. The station's subchannels include simulcasts of multicultural and First Nations radio stations from Edmonton, including CKER-FM on HD2, and sister station CIWE-FM's freeform Raven Radio Network on HD3.
