= XHEIN-FM =

Radio station in Cintalapa de Figueroa, Chiapas

- Cintalapa, Chiapas; Mexico
- Frequency: 89.9 FM
- Branding: Extremo Grupero

Programming
- Format: Regional Mexican

Ownership
- Owner: Radio Núcleo; (XEIN, La Voz del Valle, S.A. de C.V.)

History
- First air date: April 19, 1976 (concession); 2010 (FM)

Technical information
- ERP: 25 kW
- Transmitter coordinates: 16°41′27.38″N 93°42′33.71″W

Links
- Website: radionucleo.com/cintalapa/

XHEIN-FM is a radio station on 89.9 FM in Cintalapa, Chiapas. The station is owned by Radio Núcleo and carries a Regional Mexican format known as Extremo Grupero.

== History ==
XHEIN began as XEIN-AM 810, with a concession awarded on April 19, 1976. The station was moved to 560 in the 1990s before receiving an approval to migrate to FM in 2010.
