= XHTXP-FM =

Radio station in Tuxtepec, Oaxaca

San Juan Bautista Tuxtepec, Oaxaca; Mexico
- Frequency: 89.9 MHz
- Branding: Radio Cuenca

Programming
- Format: Cultural

Ownership
- Owner: Asociación de Medios de Comunicación Comunitaria, A.C.

History
- First air date: February 2018
- Call sign meaning: TuXtePec

Technical information
- Class: A
- ERP: 3 kW
- Transmitter coordinates: 18°04′52.2″N 96°07′28.43″W

Links
- Website: XHTXP-FM on Facebook

XHTXP-FM is a radio station on 89.9 FM in San Juan Bautista Tuxtepec, Oaxaca. XHTXP is owned by Asociación de Medios de Comunicación Comunitaria, A.C. and is known as Radio Cuenca.

== History ==
AMCC applied for the permit for Radio Cuenca in 2007. It was not awarded until December 14, 2016, and it took the station another year to come to air, signing on in February 2018. The concessionaire is owned by a group of civil associations and institutions, including the Instituto Tecnológico de Tuxtepec.
