= XHCTN-FM =

Radio station in La Trinitaria, Chiapas, Mexico

- La Trinitaria, Chiapas; Mexico
- Frequency: 89.9 FM
- Branding: Brisas de Montebello

Programming
- Format: Public radio

Ownership
- Owner: Government of the State of Chiapas

History
- First air date: August 13, 2003
- Call sign meaning: Ciudad La TriNitaria

Technical information
- ERP: .254 kW
- Transmitter coordinates: 16°07′08″N 92°03′06″W

Links
- Webcast: Listen live
- Website: radiotvycine.chiapas.gob.mx

XHCTN-FM is a radio station on 89.9 FM in La Trinitaria, Chiapas in Mexico. It is part of the state-owned Radio Chiapas state network and is known as Brisas de Montebello.

XHCTN signed on August 13, 2003.
