= Cave City School District =

School district in Arkansas, United States

Location
- 711 North Main Street; Cave City, Arkansas 72521 United States

District information
- Grades: PK–12
- Accreditation: Arkansas Department of Education
- Schools: 5
- NCES District ID: 0504050

Students and staff
- Students: 1,416
- Teachers: 104.19 (on FTE basis)
- Student–teacher ratio: 13.59

Other information
- Website: www.cavecity.k12.ar.us

Cave City School District is a public school district based in Cave City, Arkansas, United States. The Cave City School District provides early childhood, elementary and secondary education for more than 1,400 prekindergarten through grade 12 students at its five facilities within Sharp County. It serves Cave City and Evening Shade.

Cave City School District is accredited by the Arkansas Department of Education (ADE). Its high school was nationally recognized as a bronze medalist in the Best High Schools Report 2012 developed by U.S. News & World Report.

== History ==
On July 1, 2004, the Evening Shade School District was annexed into the Cave City School District.

== Schools ==
Secondary schools:

- Cave City High School—serving grades 9 through 12.
- Cave City Middle School—serving grades 7 and 8.

Elementary schools:

- Cave City Intermediate School—serving grades 5 and 6.
- Cave City Elementary School—serving kindergarten through grade 4.
- Evening Shade Math & Science Academy—grades pre-kindergarten through grade 4.
