= CIWE-FM =

First Nations radio station in Edmonton, Alberta, Canada

- Edmonton, Alberta; Canada
- Broadcast area: Edmonton Metropolitan Region
- Frequency: 89.3 MHz (HD Radio)
- Branding: Raven Radio Network

Programming
- Format: Freeform radio; First Nations community radio
- Subchannels: HD2: Indigenous adult hits "CUZIN Radio"; HD3: Same as HD2

Ownership
- Owner: Aboriginal Multi-Media Society
- Sister stations: CFWE-FM-4

History
- First air date: February 1, 2021
- Call sign meaning: Disambiguation of CFWE

Technical information
- Class: C
- ERP: 100,000 watts
- HAAT: 153.7 metres (504 ft)
- Transmitter coordinates: 53°38′44.88″N 114°0′14.4″W
- Translator: CJWE-HD3 Calgary

Links
- Webcast: Listen Live; Listen Live (HD2 and HD3)
- Website: ravenradio.ca

CIWE-FM (89.3 MHz, "Raven Radio Network") is a radio station in Edmonton, Alberta. Owned by the Aboriginal Multi-Media Society (AMMSA), it broadcasts a freeform format targeting Central Alberta's First Nations communities.

== History ==
Following the collapse of the Aboriginal Voices Radio Network (which broadcast on 89.3 MHz in Edmonton as CKAV-FM-4), the CRTC pursued new applicants for indigenous radio stations to fill its frequencies. The Aboriginal Multi-Media Society, owner of the Edmonton-based CFWE radio network, was granted licenses in Calgary and Edmonton. While the Calgary station would air a country music format in the mold of CFWE, AMMSA founder Bert Crowfoot described the Edmonton station as a freeform station that would play "anything but country". As with the other AMMSA stations, its schedule would include specialty programming presented in Indigenous languages, and featuring Indigenous music.

AMMSA prioritized constructing the Calgary station, CJWE-FM, which went on air in April 2018. The wait would be nearly three years longer in Edmonton; CIWE had been planned to launch in April 2020, but the COVID-19 pandemic in Alberta prompted AMMSA to seek a one-year extension. Its transmission tower, named for long-time AMMSA board member Noel McNaughten, is located 40 kilometres (25 mi) north of Spruce Grove.

The station began test broadcasts on January 11, 2021. On February 1, 2021, CIWE officially launched as 89.3 The Raven; it primarily plays classic rock and pop hits, as well as genre- and decade-based specialty shows (such as blues rock, hip hop, and R&B). Indigenous programming is carried in the Cree, Dene, Nakota, and Michif languages.
