= Jim Pekol =

American musician

James Brian Pekol (born May 4, 1961) is an American musician originally from Wausau, Wisconsin.

He graduated from the University of Wisconsin–Stevens Point with a degree in Bachelor of Music Education with an emphasis in saxophone. He then taught Grade 5-8 instrumental music for 19 years in the Wisconsin public schools. He started playing in the Wausau Concert Band in 1979, and has been the conductor since 2005. He also performs vocally and instrumentally in numerous professional and community groups.

A published composer and arranger, Pekol has written for many diverse types of groups, including band and orchestra, as well as arrangements for Jazz, Dixieland, and dance bands.

While growing up in Wausau, he was educated in the Wausau School system and began his performing career as a piano player with the "Swingin' Scots", a middle school Dixieland band under the direction of John Muir Middle School band director Raymond "Bud" Rozelle. While in high school he began playing clarinet, sax, trumpet, accordion, and piano in some of the local polka/dance bands, including the "Greiner Brothers Orchestra" (1976-1984) and the "Jerry Goetsch Orchestra" (1985-1992).

In 1979 Pekol formed his own Slovenian-style polka band in which he played the on accordion, with John Greiner on piano and later Denis Burgess on drums and Marilyn Baer on banjo. This band was known for its Slovenian beat, variety of music and well-blended vocal harmonies. The band appeared in a Trucktoberfest TV commercial for Brickner Motors of Wausau, performed as the house band at the Telemark Ski Lodge in Cable, WI, and performed with "America's Polka King" Frank Yankovic from 1986 to 1996.

Pekol and his wife Marilyn have two sons, Brian and Bob. Brian is also a professional musician in Minneapolis.
