= KSDA-FM =

Seventh-Day Adventist radio station in Agana Heights, Guam

Joy FM (KSDA-FM)
- Hågat; Guam
- Broadcast area: Guam
- Frequency: 91.9 MHz
- Branding: Joy FM

Programming
- Language: English
- Format: Religious

Ownership
- Owner: Good News Broadcasting Corporation

History
- First air date: 1987
- Former names: Adventist World Radio-Asia; Joy 92
- Call sign meaning: Seventh-day Adventist Church

Technical information
- Licensing authority: FCC
- Class: C2
- ERP: 3,800 watts
- HAAT: 305 meters
- Transmitter coordinates: 13.433128°N 144.712796°E

Links
- Public license information: Public file; LMS
- Website: joyfmradio.net

KSDA-FM (91.9 FM), on-air as JOY FM, is a radio station owned and operated by the Good News Broadcasting Corporation. Licensed to Agana Heights in Hågat, Guam, it airs a religious format.

KSDA began as "Adventist World Radio-Asia" (AWR-Asia) in 1987 and continues to broadcast on shortwave from Agat, Guam to various countries in Asia. In 1990, AWR launched a local FM station at 91.9 MHz. KSDA-FM first broadcast from AWR's Agat studio, and later from Agana Heights.

When AWR shifted its mission away from local broadcasting, KSDA-FM's operation was passed on to the church's Guam-Micronesia Mission in the early 1990s. In 2000, Good News Broadcasting Corporation (GNBC), a non-profit 501-c3 organization composed of members from various Adventist entities on Guam, received KSDA-FM's license from AWR.

The FM station was known as JOY 92 until mid-2008, when GNBC secured a construction permit for a transmitter on Saipan. The Saipan transmitter KORU rebroadcasts the Guam station on 89.9 MHz, necessitating the name change.

== See also ==
- List of radio stations in Guam
- Media ministries of the Seventh-day Adventist Church
