= CHLR (AM) =

Former radio station in New Brunswick, Canada

- Moncton, New Brunswick; Canada
- Frequency: 1380 kHz

Programming
- Language: French

Ownership
- Owner: Radio-Aboiteaux Ltée.

History
- First air date: 1981
- Last air date: January 2, 1985

Technical information
- Power: 10,000 watts

CHLR was a French-language private radio station in Moncton, New Brunswick, Canada, which broadcast at 1380 kHz on the AM band from 1981 to 1985.

== History ==
In 1980, Rufino Landry on behalf of a company to be incorporated (would be known as Radio-Aboiteaux ltée), received approval by the Canadian Radio-television and Telecommunications Commission (CRTC) to operate a new French-language AM radio station at Moncton. CHLR would be the first private French radio station in Moncton with a power of 10,000 watts. Also the same year, a competing application by Edward J. McGrath (English, 1400 kHz, 10,000 watts) was denied on the grounds, since Moncton could not support two new stations. In 1984, CHLR was authorized to become an affiliate of the network operated by Télémédia Communications Inc.

Most of CHLR's staff was laid off in November of the same year due to financial difficulties.

From its inception, CHLR had difficulty attracting sufficient audience and revenues to make the undertaking viable. Hence, Radio-Aboiteaux ltée made a proposal in bankruptcy which was accepted by its creditors and the court. CHLR 1380 left the air on January 2, 1985. Ali LeBouthilier, president of the company said they would apply for a new format and hoped to return to the air within three to six months.

In 1986, Radio-Aboiteaux's original shareholders, Rufino Landry and Alie LeBouthillier, along with four new investors applied to for a licence to operate a new English-language AM station offering a contemporary music service to listeners between 12 and 49 years of age. It would broadcast on the 1380 kHz frequency (former CHLR) with 10,000 watts. At the CRTC hearing, the applicant expressed a "desire to serve the needs of the francophone population in south-eastern New Brunswick" but the commission was not convinced that its proposed experimental bilingual programming approach "to test audience reaction" would result in the provision of French-language programming responsive to the needs of the community. In arriving at this determination, the Commission took into account Radio-Aboiteaux's previous unsuccessful attempt to establish a French-language radio service and did not consider that a further period of experimentation was warranted under the circumstances. After assessing all of the information contained in the application and the applicant's responses at the hearing, the commission was not convinced that the Contemporary music format or overall programming proposed by Radio-Aboiteaux represented a real alternative to the service already provided by CKCW. Radio-Aboiteaux Ltée's application was denied.

The call sign CHLR is now assigned to a radio station in Rigolet, Newfoundland and Labrador as CHLR-FM. Therein, CHLR-FM has no relation with the former CHLR at Moncton.
