= WLKL =

- Mattoon, Illinois; United States
- Broadcast area: Mattoon/Neoga, Illinois
- Frequency: 89.9 MHz
- Branding: "89.9 The Max Alternative"

Programming
- Format: Alternative Rock

Ownership
- Owner: Lake Land College; (Community College District #517)

History
- First air date: 1975
- Call sign meaning: W LaKe Land College

Technical information
- Licensing authority: FCC
- Facility ID: 12868
- Class: A
- Power: 1,300 Watts
- HAAT: 62 meters (203 ft)
- Transmitter coordinates: 39°25′7.0″N 88°22′55.0″W

Links
- Public license information: Public file; LMS
- Webcast: WLKL Webstream
- Website: WLKL Online

WLKL (89.9 FM, The Max Alternative) is a college radio station broadcasting an alternative music format. Licensed to Mattoon, Illinois, United States, the station serves the Mattoon/Neoga area. The station is owned by Lake Land College through its licensee Community College District #517.
