= CFWE =

First Nations radio network in Alberta, Canada

- Edmonton, Alberta; Canada
- Broadcast area: Alberta
- Frequency: 98.5 MHz (HD Radio)
- Branding: CFWE

Programming
- Format: Country; First Nations community radio

Ownership
- Owner: Aboriginal Multi-Media Society
- Sister stations: CJWE-FM, CIWE-FM

History
- First air date: 1987 in Lac La Biche

Technical information
- Class: C1
- ERP: 100,000 watts
- HAAT: 153.7 metres (504 ft)

Links
- Webcast: Listen Live
- Website: cfweradio.ca

CFWE (98.5 FM) is a radio network based in Edmonton, Alberta. Owned by the Aboriginal Multi-Media Society, it broadcasts programming targeting northern Alberta's First Nations communities, including mainstream country music, and specialty shows featuring Indigenous music or presented in native languages such as Cree and Dene.

The network broadcasts from studios in Edmonton, alongside its originating station CFWE-FM-4. It operates a network of rebroadcasters to serve the province of Alberta and its First Nations reserves.

== History ==
Owned by the Aboriginal Multi-Media Society, the station received approval from the Canadian Radio-television and Telecommunications Commission in 1987 to launch on 89.9 FM in Lac La Biche. Transmitters were later added at many other communities in northern Alberta.

CFWE-FM is a founding member of the Western Association of Aboriginal Broadcasters (WAAB). WAAB Members include Northern Native Broadcasting (BC), Northern Native Broadcasting (Yukon), Missinipi Broadcasting Corporation (Saskatchewan) and Native Communications Incorporated (Manitoba). WAAB members meet regularly to develop program ideas, share resources and work to promote Aboriginal broadcasting throughout western and northern Canada.

In 2008, AMMSA received approval from the CRTC to add new transmitters at Edmonton and Fort McMurray, with the Edmonton station becoming the de facto originating station of the network. The new transmitters, CHWE-FM-4 in Edmonton (physically located in the suburb of Spruce Grove) and CHWE-FM-5 in Fort McMurray, broadcast on 98.5 MHz and 94.5 MHz respectively.

On November 7, 2012, the AMMSA received approval to supersede CFWE-FM Lac La Biche and four low-power rebroadcasters serving nearby reserves with a new 19.6 kW signal on 90.5 MHz in Lac La Biche. In 2016, CHWE-FM-4's power was increased from 9.3 kW to 100 kW. In September 2017, the AMMSA received approval to add a 100,000 watt transmitter at 105.7 MHz in Grande Prairie, which superseded low-power transmitters serving the Horse Lake Reserve and Duncan's Band Reserve.

In June 2018, CFWE launched a new sister station in Calgary, CJWE-FM, taking the place of the former Aboriginal Voices Radio Network station. It carries a similar format, but with a focus on southern Alberta Treaty 7 communities. In December 2018, the CRTC granted a request for CFWE-FM-2 (Piikani 147) to switch to CJWE, as its programming would be more relevant to the area.

In May 2019, the CRTC approved a new transmitter in Red Deer.

In February 2021, CFWE launched a second sister station on another former Aboriginal Voices frequency in Edmonton, CIWE-FM; the station carries a freeform format as 89.3 The Raven.

In May 2026, CFWE's Edmonton frequency 98.5 FM began broadcasting in HD Radio.

== Programming ==
Radio Bingo airs on Monday, Thursday, and Saturday nights, with proceeds being used to help support the AMMSA and its broadcasting activities. AMMSA CEO Bert Crowfoot stated that the program was popular enough that North Alberta residents often chose to not schedule meetings on Monday or Thursday evenings so they wouldn't miss it.

== Rebroadcasters ==
The station has an extensive network of rebroadcasters throughout the province.

| Call sign | Frequency | City of License |
|---|---|---|
| CFWE-FM-1 | 91.7 FM | Joussard |
| CFWE-FM-2 | 89.3 FM | Peigan Reserve |
| CFWE-FM-3 | 96.7 FM | Moose Hills |
| CFWE-FM-4 | 98.5 FM HD1 | Edmonton |
| CFWE-FM-5 | 94.5 FM | Fort McMurray |
| CFWE-FM-6 | 90.5 FM | Lac La Biche |
| CFWE-FM-7 | 105.7 FM | Grande Prairie |
| VF2084 | 89.9 FM | Cadotte Lake |
| VF2085 | 89.9 FM | Conklin |
| VF2087 | 89.9 FM | Fort Chipewyan |
| VF2090 | 89.9 FM | John D'Or Prairie |
| VF2091 | 90.5 FM | Little Buffalo |
| VF2092 | 89.9 FM | Loon Lake |
| VF2176 | 89.9 FM | Boyer River |
| VF2177 | 89.9 FM | Bushe River |
| VF2178 | 89.9 FM | Janvier |
| VF2179 | 89.9 FM | Child Lake |
| VF2180 | 89.9 FM | Wabasca-Desmarais |
| VF2182 | 89.9 FM | Fort McKay |
| VF2186 | 89.9 FM | Tall Cree North |
| VF2187 | 89.9 FM | Paddle Prairie |
| VF2188 | 89.9 FM | Peavine |
| VF2190 | 88.7 FM | Slave Lake |
| VF2191 | 89.9 FM | Tall Cree South |
| VF2192 | 89.9 FM | Sturgeon Lake |
| VF2241 | 89.9 FM | Anzac |
| VF2243 | 89.9 FM | Duncan's |
| VF2251 | 89.9 FM | Heart Lake |
| VF2252 | 89.9 FM | Horse Lake |
| VF2255 | 89.9 FM | Peerless Lake |
| VF2256 | 89.9 FM | Sandy Lake |
| VF2257 | 89.9 FM | Trout Lake |
| VF2258 | 89.9 FM | White Fish Lake |

|-
