= Goodfish Lake, Alberta =

Coordinates: 54°19′20.24″N 111°50′45.30″W

Location of Goodfish Lake Alberta

Goodfish Lake is an Indian reserve in northern Alberta within the Goodfish reserve of the Whitefish Lake First Nation. It is located 12 kilometres (7.5 mi) east of Highway 36, 109 kilometres (68 mi) west of Cold Lake.
