= WCDE =

Air 1 affiliate station at Davis and Elkins College in Elkins, West Virginia

- Elkins, West Virginia; United States
- Broadcast area: Metro Elkins
- Frequency: 89.9 MHz
- Branding: Air1

Programming
- Format: Christian worship
- Affiliations: Air1

Ownership
- Owner: Davis and Elkins College; (Board of Trustees, Davis and Elkins College)

History
- First air date: 1975
- Former frequencies: 90.3 MHz (1975–2015)
- Call sign meaning: W College of Davis & Elkins

Technical information
- Licensing authority: FCC
- Facility ID: 4298
- Class: A
- Power: 260 watts
- HAAT: -105 Meters
- Transmitter coordinates: 38°55′52.0″N 79°50′49.0″W

Links
- Public license information: Public file; LMS
- Webcast: Listen Live
- Website: air1.com

WCDE (89.9 FM) is a Christian worship formatted broadcast radio station licensed to Elkins, West Virginia & serves Metro Elkins with programming from the Air1 radio network. WCDE is owned and operated by Davis and Elkins College.
