= CITK-FM =

Coordinates: 48°39′18″N 74°56′27″W

- Obedjiwan, Quebec; Canada
- Frequency: 89.9 MHz

Programming
- Format: First Nations community radio

Ownership
- Owner: Corporation Tepatcimo Kitotakan

History
- First air date: February 23, 1994

Technical information
- Licensing authority: CRTC
- ERP: 23 watts (average); 50 watts (peak)
- HAAT: 19.5 metres (64 ft)

Links
- Website: atikamekw.ca/radio-citkfm

CITK-FM is a First Nations community radio station that operates at 89.9 FM in Obedjiwan, Quebec, Canada.

Owned by Corporation Tepatcimo Kitotakan, the station received CRTC approval in 1994.
