= Radio Norfolk 89.9FM =

Coordinates: 29°02′02″S 167°57′10″E

Radio Norfolk
- Australia
- Broadcast area: Norfolk Island
- Frequencies: 89.9FM & 1566AM

Ownership
- Owner: Norfolk Island Radio Ltd

Radio Norfolk (callsign: VL2NI) is a community radio station serving Norfolk Island, a South Pacific island.

== History ==
Radio broadcasting began as a means of announcing incoming aircraft during World War II. During the 1960s and 1970s, the station provided primarily shipping and aircraft news.

In the early days of radio on Norfolk Island, the station was situated in the administration buildings in Kingston, inside the new military barracks (now the office of the Norfolk Island Administrator). The station's studios were damaged by fire in the 1970s, and since then Radio Norfolk has been housed in its current premises in New Cascade Road, close to Burnt Pine.

In 1999, Radio Norfolk installed a 10-metre satellite dish to continue to receive and relay overseas TV and radio services on their own dedicated frequencies, and re-transmit other services overnight while the local station was closed.

In 1991, the Norfolk Island Broadcasting Service (which includes both television and radio services on Norfolk Island) became an additional full member of the Asia-Pacific Broadcasting Union.

In 2025 Radio Norfolk transitioned from being a government-owned and operated station to a community radio station run by Norfolk Island Radio Ltd.
