= KWCN =

- Pinedale, Wyoming; United States
- Frequency: 89.9 MHz

Programming
- Format: Variety

Ownership
- Owner: WCN, Inc.

History
- First air date: 2012

Technical information
- Licensing authority: FCC
- Facility ID: 176230
- Class: A
- ERP: 75 watts
- Transmitter coordinates: 42°50′39″N 109°55′23″W
- Translator: K234BI 94.7 (Big Piney)

Links
- Public license information: Public file; LMS

KWCN (89.9 FM) is a radio station broadcasting a variety format. Licensed to Pinedale, Wyoming, United States, the station is currently owned by WCN, Inc.

== Translators ==
In addition to the main station, KWCN is relayed by two additional translators to widen its broadcast area.

| Call sign | Frequency | City of license | FID | ERP (W) | Class | FCC info |
|---|---|---|---|---|---|---|
| K234BI | 94.7 FM | Big Piney, Wyoming | | 97 | D | |
| K286AI | 105.1 FM | Bondurant, Wyoming | | 250 | D | |
