= CKKE-FM =

Coordinates: 50°17′26″N 64°01′46″W

- Mingan, Quebec; Canada
- Frequency: 90.1 MHz
- Branding: Radio Kapetatshimut

Programming
- Format: First Nations community radio

Ownership
- Owner: Corporation de radio montagnaise de Mingan

History
- First air date: March 1980
- Former frequencies: 89.9 MHz (1980–1991)

Technical information
- ERP: 10 watts
- HAAT: 11 metres (36 ft)

Links
- Website: www.ekuanitshit.com/radio-kapetatshimut

CKKE-FM is a First Nations community radio station that operates at 89.9 FM in Mingan, Quebec, Canada.

The station originally began broadcasting in March 1980 at 90.1 FM until it received CRTC approval to move to its current frequency in 1991.

CKKE is owned by Corporation de Radio montagnaise de Mingan.
