= WVKJ =

- Dublin, New Hampshire; United States
- Frequency: 89.9 MHz
- Branding: WVKJ Radio

Programming
- Format: Religious
- Affiliations: VCY America

Ownership
- Owner: The Kingdom Christian Ministries

History
- Call sign meaning: "A Voice for King Jesus"

Technical information
- Licensing authority: FCC
- Facility ID: 174121
- Class: A
- ERP: 4,500 watts
- HAAT: 115 meters (377 ft)
- Transmitter coordinates: 42°53′58″N 72°7′16″W

Links
- Public license information: Public file; LMS
- Website: kingdomchristianministries.org/about/our-ministries/wvkj/

WVKJ (89.9 FM) is a radio station licensed to serve the community of Dublin, New Hampshire. The station is owned by The Kingdom Christian Ministries, and airs a religious format.

The station was assigned the WVKJ call letters by the Federal Communications Commission on May 10, 2011.
