= KFER =

Radio station in Santa Cruz, California

- Santa Cruz, California; United States
- Broadcast area: Santa Cruz, California
- Frequency: 89.9 MHz
- Branding: Aware FM

Programming
- Format: Religious

Ownership
- Owner: Santa Cruz Educational Broadcasting Foundation

Technical information
- Licensing authority: FCC
- Facility ID: 59064
- Class: A
- ERP: 200 watts
- HAAT: 8 meters (26 ft)
- Transmitter coordinates: 37°0′44.8″N 121°58′28.8″W

Links
- Public license information: Public file; LMS

KFER (89.9 FM) is a radio station broadcasting a Religious format. Licensed to Santa Cruz, California, United States, it serves the Santa Cruz area. The station is currently owned by Santa Cruz Educational Broadcasting Foundation. It goes under the branding of Aware FM.
