= DWFX =

Radio station in Legazpi, Philippines

- Legazpi; Philippines
- Broadcast area: Albay and surrounding areas
- Frequency: 89.9 MHz

Programming
- Format: Silent

Ownership
- Owner: Radio Mindanao Network

History
- First air date: December 2010
- Last air date: February 2024
- Former names: Fox 89.9 (December 2010–February 2024)
- Call sign meaning: Fox

Technical information
- Licensing authority: NTC

DWFX (89.9 FM) is a radio station owned and operated by Radio Mindanao Network.

It was formerly known as Fox 89.9 under Radio Sorsogon Network from its inception in December 2010 to February 2024, when it went off air.
