= CJPL-FM =

First Nations community radio station in Postville, Newfoundland and Labrador

Coordinates: 54°54′32″N 59°46′16″W

- Postville, Newfoundland and Labrador; Canada
- Frequency: 89.9 MHz

Programming
- Format: First Nations community radio

Ownership
- Owner: Postville Radio Society Inc.

History
- First air date: 1987

Technical information
- ERP: 17 watts
- HAAT: 9 metres (30 ft)

CJPL-FM is a First Nations community radio station that operates at 17 watts on 89.9 FM in Postville, Newfoundland and Labrador, Canada.

The station was licensed in 1987.
