= WVRU-FM =

- Radford, Virginia; United States
- Broadcast area: Radford, Virginia
- Frequency: 89.9 MHz
- Branding: Public Radio WVRU

Programming
- Format: Public radio, jazz and talk
- Affiliations: NPR; PRX; BBC World Service

Ownership
- Owner: Radford University

History
- First air date: October 27, 1978
- Call sign meaning: Virginia Radford University

Technical information
- Licensing authority: FCC
- Facility ID: 54450
- Class: A
- Power: 500 watts
- HAAT: 5 meters (16 ft)
- Transmitter coordinates: 37°08′26.0″N 80°33′11.0″W

Links
- Public license information: Public file; LMS
- Webcast: Listen live
- Website: radford.edu/content/wvru/home.html

WVRU-FM (89.9 MHz) is a non-commercial radio station licensed to Radford, Virginia, United States. Owned by Radford University, the station plays jazz music, adult album alternative and world music. It airs National Public Radio (NPR) and Public Radio Exchange (PRX) news and talk shows afternoons and weekends, and runs the BBC World Service overnight.

== History ==
The station signed on the air on October 27, 1978. Its original call sign was WRRC.

On June 1, 1981, the station changed its call letters to the current WVRU-FM.

== Programming ==
WVRU-FM is a full-service public radio station, airing nationally and locally produced music and public affairs programming. It is a network affiliate of National Public Radio (NPR), American Public Media (APM) and the Public Radio Exchange (PRX).

WVRU-FM airs NPR programs World Cafe, Alt.Latino, Mountain Stage, Conversations From the World Cafe and All Songs Considered. From PRX, it carries Afropop Worldwide, Studio 360 and PRI's The World. The station also airs some independently created public affairs and music programs.
