= WSCB =

- Springfield, Massachusetts; United States
- Broadcast area: Springfield, Massachusetts
- Frequency: 89.9 MHz
- Branding: WSCB 89.9 The Birthplace

Programming
- Format: College radio

Ownership
- Owner: Springfield College; (The President & Trustee of Springfield College)

History
- First air date: November 29, 1958
- Call sign meaning: "Springfield College Broadcasting"

Technical information
- Licensing authority: FCC
- Facility ID: 66279
- Class: A
- ERP: 100 watts
- HAAT: 11 meters (36 ft)
- Transmitter coordinates: 42°5′59.00″N 72°33′30.00″W

Links
- Public license information: Public file; LMS
- Webcast: Listen live
- Website: wscbthebirthplace.wordpress.com

WSCB (89.9 FM; "The Birthplace") is a student-run campus radio station at Springfield College in Springfield, Massachusetts. It features an eclectic mix of music as well as news and sports talk from a variety of disc jockeys. WSCB's programming comes from students, faculty, and staff on the Springfield College campus.
