= CHLR-FM =

First Nations radio station in Newfoundland and Labrador, Canada

Coordinates: 54°10′35″N 58°25′56″W

- Rigolet, Newfoundland and Labrador; Canada
- Frequency: 89.9 MHz

Programming
- Format: First Nations community radio

Ownership
- Owner: Rigolet Radio Society Inc.

History
- First air date: 1986

Technical information
- ERP: 17 watts
- HAAT: 9 metres

CHLR-FM is a First Nations community radio station that operates at 89.9 FM in Rigolet, Newfoundland and Labrador, Canada.

The station was licensed in 1986.

CHLR was a former callsign of an unrelated radio station in Moncton, New Brunswick, from 1981 to 1985.
