= WCNO =

Radio station in Palm City, Florida

- Palm City, Florida; United States
- Broadcast area: West Palm Beach - Palm Beach County - Treasure Coast
- Frequency: 89.9 MHz
- Branding: WCNO 89.9

Programming
- Format: Christian talk and teaching - Christian music

Ownership
- Owner: National Christian Network, Inc.

History
- First air date: April 9, 1990
- Call sign meaning: Christian Network

Technical information
- Licensing authority: FCC
- Facility ID: 47554
- Class: C1
- ERP: 100,000 watts
- HAAT: 187 meters (614 ft)
- Transmitter coordinates: 27°7′20″N 80°23′21″W

Links
- Public license information: Public file; LMS
- Webcast: Listen live
- Website: www.wcno.com

WCNO (89.9 FM) is a non-commercial, listener-supported radio station licensed to Palm City, Florida, and serving West Palm Beach, Palm Beach County and Florida's Treasure Coast. It airs a Christian talk and teaching radio format, with some Christian music, and is owned by the National Christian Network, Inc. The studios and offices are on SW Mapp Road in downtown Palm City.

WCNO has an effective radiated power (ERP) of 100,000 watts, the maximum for most American FM stations. The transmitter is off Florida State Road 714, west of Interstate 95 near Port St. Lucie.

== Programming ==
WCNO airs a mix of local and national Christian talk and teaching programs. Hosts include Chuck Swindoll, Joyce Meyer, R.C. Sproul, David Jeremiah, J. Vernon McGee and Charles Stanley. When teaching shows are not scheduled, WCNO plays soft Christian music.

== History ==
On April 9, 1990, the station first signed on the air. Since its founding, it has been owned by the National Christian Network and has broadcast a Christian radio format.
