= WOEL-FM =

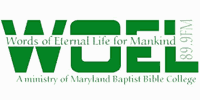
- Elkton, Maryland; United States
- Frequency: 89.9 MHz

Programming
- Format: Religious

Ownership
- Owner: Maranatha Bible Institute, Inc.

Technical information
- Licensing authority: FCC
- Facility ID: 39897
- Class: A
- ERP: 3,000 watts
- HAAT: 79.0 meters
- Transmitter coordinates: 39°35′35.00″N 75°51′49.00″W

Links
- Public license information: Public file; LMS
- Webcast: Listen live
- Website: Official website

WOEL-FM (89.9 FM) is a radio station broadcasting a Religious format in Elkton, Maryland. The station is currently owned by Maranatha Bible Institute, Inc. The FM station, Maryland Baptist Bible College, and Maryland Baptist Church Academy (grades K-12) are all ministries of Maranatha Baptist Church in Elkton.

WOEL signed on in 1978 on 88.3 MHz. Due to interference with WPVI Channel 6 in Philadelphia, WOEL was moved to 89.9 MHz in 1983.

Past and current programs aired by WOEL include productions by Bob Jones University, The Gospel Hour with Oliver B. Greene, Creation Moments, The People's Gospel Hour with Perry F. Rockwood, Keys to Family Living with Jack Palmer, and Unshackled from the Pacific Garden Mission. Live church services are also broadcast from Maranatha Baptist Church. The music is conservative and traditional.

In the 1980s, WOEL was rebroadcast on two translators, one in Waynesboro, Pennsylvania and one in Easton, Maryland on 90.7 MHz. Both translators are now off the air.

The transmitter is located at the corner of the Old Elk Neck Road and Jones Chapel Road, southwest of Elkton.
