= KBNL =

Radio station in Laredo, Texas

Coordinates: 27.6577996°N 99.5863438°W

- Laredo, Texas; United States
- Broadcast area: Laredo, Texas; Nuevo Laredo, Tamaulipas
- Frequency: 89.9 FM
- Branding: Manantial FM

Programming
- Format: Spanish Christian

Ownership
- Owner: Inspiracom; (World Radio Network, Inc.)

Technical information
- Licensing authority: FCC
- Facility ID: 73750
- Class: C
- ERP: 100,000 Watts
- HAAT: 184 m (604 ft)

Links
- Public license information: Public file; LMS
- Website: KBNL

KBNL (branded as Radio Manantial) is a Christian Spanish Talk format FM radio station that serves the Laredo, Texas, United States and Nuevo Laredo, Tamaulipas, Mexico border area.
