= KORU =

Radio station in Garapan, Saipan, Northern Mariana Islands

KORU (Joy FM)
Simulcasts KSDA-FM, Agat, Guam
- Garapan, Saipan, Northern Mariana Islands; United States
- Frequency: 89.9 MHz
- Branding: "Joy FM"

Programming
- Format: Religious
- Affiliations: Seventh-day Adventist Church

Ownership
- Owner: Good News Broadcasting Corporation
- Sister stations: KSDA-FM

Technical information
- Licensing authority: FCC
- Facility ID: 172880
- Class: C2
- ERP: 1,800 watts
- HAAT: 455.0 meters (1,492.8 ft)
- Transmitter coordinates: 15°11′06″N 145°44′30″E

Links
- Public license information: (Joy FM) Public file; LMS
- Website: joyfmradio.net

KORU, (89.9 FM) branded as Joy FM is a radio station licensed to Garapan, Saipan, Northern Mariana Islands. The station is currently owned by Good News Broadcasting Corporation, and simulcasts the signal from KSDA-FM.
