= Cave City, Arkansas =

- City
- Location of Cave City in Independence County and Sharp County, Arkansas.
- Coordinates: 35°56′53″N 91°33′3″W
- Country: United States
- State: Arkansas
- Counties: Independence, Sharp
- Townships: Barren (Independence); Cave (Sharp)
- Settled: 1890
- Founder: James Andrew Laman and John William Laman

Area
  - Total: 2.56 sq mi (6.62 km^{2})
  - Land: 2.56 sq mi (6.62 km^{2})
  - Water: 0 sq mi (0.00 km^{2})
- Elevation: 653 ft (199 m)

Population (2020)
  - Total: 1,922
  - Estimate (2025): 1,987 ▲
  - Density: 751.7/sq mi (290.23/km^{2})
- Time zone: UTC-6 (Central (CST))
  - Summer (DST): UTC-5 (CDT)
- ZIP code: 72521
- Area code: 870
- FIPS code: 05-12280
- GNIS feature ID: 2404007
- Website: www.cavecity.us

Cave City is a city in Independence and Sharp counties in the U.S. state of Arkansas. The population was 1,922 at the 2020 U.S. Census. The city was named for a large cave underneath the Crystal River Tourist Camp, which is the oldest motor court in Arkansas. Cave City is known for its award-winning "world's sweetest" watermelons and holds an annual watermelon festival in July.

== History ==
On March 14, 2025, a devastating EF3 tornado hit the city, causing severe and widespread damage to homes and businesses. Mayor Jonas Anderson issued a state of emergency and a curfew during the overnight hours of March 15. Arkansas governor Sarah Huckabee Sanders visited Cave City the following morning as well to tour the damage.

== Geography ==
Cave City is located at 35°56′53″N 91°33′3″W (35.948087, -91.550952). The town is centered on, and partially located above, the Crystal River, an underground body of water located in the multi-room Crystal River Cave, for which the town is named. The beginning and ending of the water source has never been determined.

According to the United States Census Bureau, the city has a total area of 1.2 square miles (3.1 km^{2}), all land.

=== List of highways ===
- U.S. Highway 167
- Arkansas Highway 58
- Arkansas Highway 230

== Demographics ==
Historical population
Census	Pop.	Note	%±
1910	278		—
1920	243		−12.6%
1930	296		21.8%
1940	427		44.3%
1950	442		3.5%
1960	540		22.2%
1970	807		49.4%
1980	1,634		102.5%
1990	1,503		−8.0%
2000	1,946		29.5%
2010	1,904		−2.2%
2020	1,922		0.9%
2025 (est.)	1,987	▲	3.4%
U.S. Decennial Census; 2014 Estimate

=== 2020 census ===
Cave City racial composition
Race	Number	Percentage
White (non-Hispanic)	1,711	89.02%
Black or African American (non-Hispanic)	53	2.76%
Native American	16	0.83%
Asian	8	0.42%
Other/Mixed	81	4.21%
Hispanic or Latino	53	2.76%

As of the 2020 census, Cave City had a population of 1,922. The median age was 37.1 years. 25.3% of residents were under the age of 18 and 18.3% of residents were 65 years of age or older. For every 100 females there were 87.9 males, and for every 100 females age 18 and over there were 84.7 males age 18 and over.

0.0% of residents lived in urban areas, while 100.0% lived in rural areas.

There were 760 households in Cave City, including 554 families. Of all households, 35.4% had children under the age of 18 living in them, 39.2% were married-couple households, 17.4% were households with a male householder and no spouse or partner present, and 35.0% were households with a female householder and no spouse or partner present. About 30.2% of all households were made up of individuals and 15.3% had someone living alone who was 65 years of age or older.

There were 854 housing units, of which 11.0% were vacant. The homeowner vacancy rate was 3.1% and the rental vacancy rate was 7.4%.

=== 2000 census ===
At the 2000 census there were 1,904 people in 751 households, including 504 families, in the city. The population density was 752.7 inhabitants per square mile (290.6/km^{2}). There were 838 housing units at an average density of 326.1 per square mile (125.9/km^{2}). The racial makeup of the city was 0.3% Black, 96.9% white or European, 0.1% Asian, and 1.5% from two or more races. 2.5% of the population were Hispanic or Latino of any race.

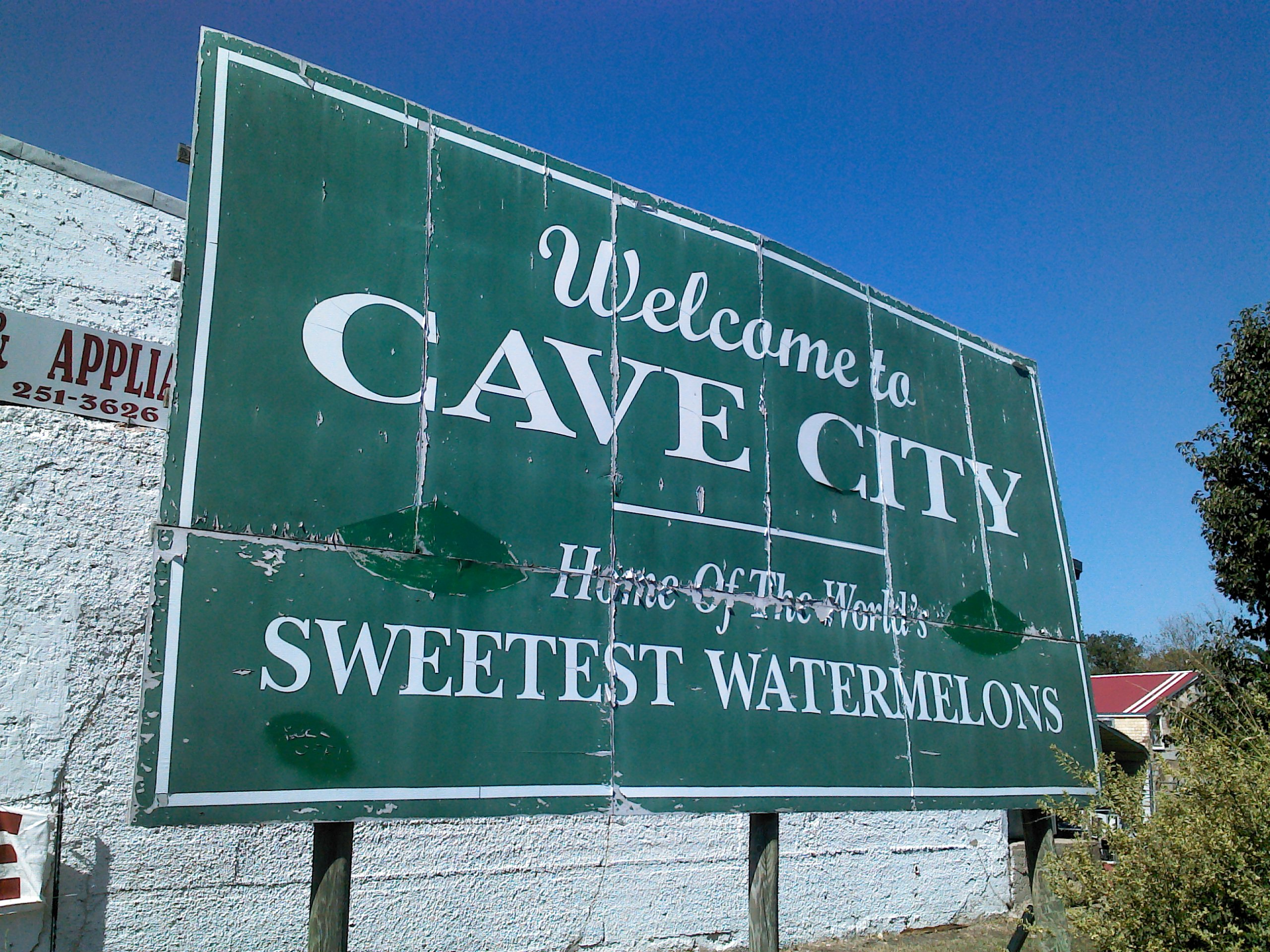
The Cave City welcome sign boasts that the town is the "Home of the World's Sweetest Watermelon".

Of the 751 households 34.8% had children under the age of 18 living with them, 49% were married couples living together, 14.5% had a female householder with no husband present, and 32.9% were non-families. 29.6% of households were one person and 14.7% were one person aged 65 or older. The average household size was 2.45 and the average family size was 3.01.

The age distribution was 31.1% under the age of 18, 5.4% from 19 to 24, 24.9% from 25 to 44, 20.8% from 45 to 64, and 18% 65 or older. The median age was 35.8 years. For every 100 females, there were 79.9 males. 31.4% of the male population and 40.3% of females were 18 and over.

The median household income was $23,163 and the median family income was $27,292. Males had a median income of $21,397 versus $17,424 for females. The per capita income for the city was $11,925. About 17.0% of families and 21.3% of the population were below the poverty line, including 26.3% of those under age 18 and 15.6% of those age 65 or over.

== Education ==
Students in the area can attend the Cave City School District.
