= WWSP =

- Stevens Point, Wisconsin; United States
- Frequency: 89.9 MHz
- Branding: 90fm Your Only Alternative

Programming
- Format: Alternative

Ownership
- Owner: Board of Regents, University of Wisconsin System

History
- First air date: September 27, 1968 (58 years ago)
- Former call signs: WSUS-FM (1968–1972)

Technical information
- Licensing authority: FCC
- Facility ID: 4286
- Class: C2
- ERP: 30,000 watts
- HAAT: 97.9 meters
- Transmitter coordinates: 44°28′55.00″N 89°40′35.00″W

Links
- Public license information: Public file; LMS
- Webcast: Listen live
- Website: Official website

WWSP (89.9 FM) is a student-operated radio station broadcasting from Stevens Point, Wisconsin. The station is owned by the Board of Regents of the University of Wisconsin System. The station broadcasts on an alternative format and features alternative and independent music, sports, and talk programming.

Each April the station hosts a trivia contest run by local radio personalities David A. Colthurst and Jim "Oz" Oliva to raise funds for the station. Billing itself as "The World's Largest Trivia Contest," the contest regularly draws 12,000 players with local, national, and international participants.

== Early Radio Projects at UW-Stevens Point ==
=== WLBL Programming (1931-1950) ===
Prior to the launch of WSUS-FM, several attempts at a college radio station launch existed. The first college-related programming launched in 1931 on WLBL, in Wausau, Wisconsin. Early programming was limited to a one hour segment on Fridays. Programming ended in 1933 due to larger fiscal decisions within the Wisconsin Educational Communications Board. Following the 1933 hiatus, a new radio studio was constructed within the Central State Teacher's College Laboratory School (now the UW-Stevens Point Communication Arts Center); the studio was originally planned to replace an art room on the 3rd floor, but was instead constructed on the north end of the 1st floor. The new Stevens Point studio went live in 1938 with the capability of broadcasting from a variety of campus locations including the college's band room. Broadcasting on WLBL ended July 1st, 1950 after the station was acquired by the Wisconsin Department of Agriculture; the transmitter phone line was cut, and the station was relocated to Auburndale, Wisconsin.

=== Closed-Circuit FM Station (1960-1963) ===
Following the closure of WLBL, the university (now Wisconsin State College-Stevens Point) began the process of implementing a new closed-circuit radio program throughout campus as part of the academic curriculum. Initially using the call sign WDSN, the station broadcast from the Old Main basement to Delzell, Steiner, and Nelson halls beginning in 1960. Following the addition of new residence halls, the station changed to the call sign WCSC. In the mid-1960s, the station ceased broadcasting. The station faced issues such as outdated equipment; former DJ Bob Changon reminisced in a 1994 Pointer article that the equipment at the station was already twenty years old during his involvement in the early 1960s.

== History ==
=== Organization (1967-1972) ===
==== Debut (1967-68) ====
In 1967, faculty within the drama department began correspondence with the Federal Communications Commission to open a non-commercial, educational radio station at the university. Initially, the program was intended to supplement the drama curriculum. With support from chancellor Lee Sherman Dreyfus, the station acquired a 10-watt transmitter from Wisconsin State University-Whitewater (University of Wisconsin-Whitewater). Permission to construct a 75-foot, Type BFE-10C tower was granted on the condition that construction would be completed by August 21st, 1968. Legal notice of the tower's construction was published in September, 1967. The new station was announced as WSER in the Pointer on September 13th,1967; programming was to include rock 'n' roll, jazz, and classical programming, Associated Press newswires, and broadcasts of off campus events. Although slated to open fall 1967, the opening date was postponed to September of 1968 because of equipment manufacturing delays. The first organizational meeting for the new station, now designated as WSUS-FM occurred in February of 1968.

==== WSUS-FM (1968-1972) ====
On September 22nd, 1968 the new WSUS station went live for the first time under a temporary license marking the first time radio programming was hosted on campus since WCSC's operations ceased in the early 1960s. Early programming consisted of educational content for youth, music, and a nightly sign-off prayer from a local clergyman. The station received a permanent license from the Federal Communications Commission (FCC) in January 1969.

=== 90FM (1972- ) ===
==== Early Years (1972-1990) ====
Following the restructure of the Wisconsin State University system to the Universities of Wisconsin System, WSUS-FM changed its call letters to WWSP after the in April 1972. WWSP continued to air during the school year. The station adopted several practices to keep funding early on, including an annual telethon (now WWSP Radiothon), and underwriting. In 1980, 90FM found itself in controversy with upper administration over its underwriting practices; Chancellor Phillip Marshall saw the practices as a form of advertising, which violated the station's educational, non-commercial license. 90FM was allowed to keep practices. A series of technical changes were made at the station throughout the mid-1980s. Station power increased from 300 watts to 3,610 watts and a new computer system was introduced to the studio.

==== Modern History (1990- ) ====
90FM continues to operate as the Wausau-Stevens Point market's sole alternative radio station. The station operates using mostly physical media with live personalities. The station currently operates at 30,000 watts and covers a 60-mile broadcast radius in Central Wisconsin.

== WWSP Trivia ==
=== History ===
90FM Trivia debuted in 1970 on the WSUS-FM platform as a fundraiser for the station. In 1979, media personalities Jim "Oz" Oliva and John Eckendorf began writing the contest. During this time, the contest gained notoriety as the "World's Largest Trivia Contest." In 2006, the documentary Trivia Town was produced. In 2020, the contest was cancelled due to the COVID-19 pandemic. In 2022, Club Wisconsin host and UW-Stevens Point alum David Colthurst took over writing the contest. Another major upset occurred in 2025; network issues with a new VoIP phone system led to a delay in the contest and a temporary move to an online-form based answer submission. On March 14th, 2026, a new phone system test was conducted during the Saturday Morning Freakshow.

=== Rules ===
WWSP Trivia is a 54-hour contest held in April. During the contest, the following rules are in effect:

- Eight questions are asked per hour
- Teams are given two songs to answer their question
- Only one answer may be submitted per team
- All teams that answer correctly receive an equal share of the 2,000 points, with a minimum of 5 points and a maximum of 500 points
- Running questions are given at specific locations in Stevens Point; teams are asked to gather information within running distance of the meeting site
- Each trivia stone may be found following a group of clues. These clues lead people through Stevens Point and the countryside. Each time a stone is found, the team's copy of the "New Trivia Times" will be stamped. One stamp is worth 50 points, two stamps are worth 150 points, and three stamps are worth 300 points.
- All rules are subject to change, per the contest writer [Oz]
- Awards are given to places 1-10

In addition to this, a 24/7 complaint line is active during the entirety of the contest.

List of Trivia Contests
Year	Theme	Winner
1996	Trivia 27: What a Long, Strange Trip It's Been	
1997	Trivia 28: Mission Trivia	Operation Kubark: Kent Meets Hike
1998	Trivia 29	No Easy Trivia When Oz Reads Kerouac
1999	Trivia 30: Trivia Like It's 1999	CNOF54: Runnin' Outta Time
2000	Trivia 31	Being Bud Somerville
2004	Trivia 35: Thanks for the Contest	Knights of Neek
2005	Trivia 36: Keep On Trivia	Work the Net
2006	Trivia 37: The Odd Contest	Oddly Enough It's Network
2007	Trivia 38: Trivia Returns	Tin Man
2008	Trivia 39: Trivia Invasion	Network
2009	Trivia 40: Here's Looking At You, Kid	The Usual Suspects...Network
2010	Trivia 41: The Dark Side of the Contest	
2011	Trivia 42: Vitalovetriviamin For Health	The Anti-Social Network
2012	Trivia 43: Trivia Grit!	
2013	Trivia 44	Dad's Computers: 35 Years of Trivia
2014	Trivia 45	Dad's Computers: Never Say Die
2015	Trivia 46: Guardians of the Contest	Dad's Computers
2016	Trivia 47: Not Your Father's Contest	Festivus For the Rest of Us
2017	Trivia 48: The Royalty of Contests	Festivus For The Rest of Us
2018	Trivia 49: Trivia Rush of 49	Festivus For The Rest of Us
2020	Retro Trivia 2020	Contest cancelled due to COVID-19 Pandemic
2021	Trivia 51: Raid on Trivia 51	Mom's Computers
2022	Trivia 52: The Stacked Deck	Dads Computers: G'Bye Yellow Brick Road
2023	Trivia 53: The Trivia Life For Me	Festivus For The Rest of Us
2024	Trivia 54: Very Superstitious	Dad's Computers
2025	Trivia 55: No Limits	Dad's Computers: Potassium Power
2026	Trivia 56: The Love Contest	Dad's Computers: The Grateful Dad

Vault scores available from 1997 onward only.
