= KPCO-FM =

- Cooper, Texas; United States
- Frequency: 89.9 MHz

Programming
- Format: Spanish religious

Ownership
- Owner: Iglesia Cristiana Ebenezer

Technical information
- Licensing authority: FCC
- Facility ID: 174838
- Class: A
- ERP: 100 watts
- HAAT: 66.6 metres (219 ft)
- Transmitter coordinates: 33.3675°N 95.6736°W

Links
- Public license information: Public file; LMS
- Webcast: Listen Live
- Website: Official Website

KPCO-FM (89.9 FM) is a radio station licensed to serve the community of Cooper, Texas. The station is owned by Iglesia Cristiana Ebenezer, and airs a Spanish religious format.

The station was assigned the KPCO-FM call letters by the Federal Communications Commission on May 11, 2011.
