= List of radio stations in Utah =

The following is a list of FCC-licensed radio stations in the U.S. state of Utah, which can be sorted by their call signs, frequencies, cities of license, licensees, and programming formats.

== List of radio stations ==
Call sign	Frequency	City of license	Owner	Format
KAAJ-LP	103.9 FM	Monticello	First Baptist Church	Contemporary Christian
KAAZ-FM	106.7 FM	Spanish Fork	iHM Licenses, LLC	Mainstream rock
KAGJ	88.9 FM	Ephraim	Snow College	Variety
KALL	700 AM	North Salt Lake	Broadway Media LS, LLC	Sports (ESPN)
KANN	1120 AM	Roy	Faith Communications Corporation	Contemporary Christian
KARB	98.3 FM	Price	Eastern Utah Broadcasting Company	Country
KAZZ	1400 AM	Parowan	Canyon Media Group, Inc.	Sports (ISN)
KBDX	92.7 FM	Blanding	San Juan Record Inc	Classic hits
KBEE	98.7 FM	Salt Lake City	Radio License Holding CBC, LLC	Adult contemporary
KBER	101.1 FM	Ogden	Radio License Holding CBC, LLC	Mainstream rock
KBJA	1640 AM	Sandy	United Broadcasting Company, Inc.	Talk
KBJF	90.5 FM	Nephi	CSN International	Christian (CSN International)
KBLQ-FM	92.9 FM	Logan	Sun Valley Radio, Incorporated	Adult contemporary
KBLU-LP	92.3 FM	Logan	Aggie Radio	Variety
KBYU-FM	89.1 FM	Provo	Brigham Young University	Classical
KBZN	97.9 FM	Ogden	Capitol Broadcasting, Inc.	Adult contemporary
KCEU	89.7 FM	Price	USU Eastern	Public radio
KCHG	88.7 FM	Cedar City	Calvary Chapel Cedar City, Inc.	Christian
KCIN	94.9 FM	Cedar City	Townsquare License, LLC	Country
KCLS	101.5 FM	Leeds	Canyon Media Group, LLC	Adult contemporary
KCPX	1490 AM	Spanish Valley	AZED 5 Communications, LLC	News Talk Information
KCUA	92.5 FM	Maeser	Country Gold Broascasting, Inc.	Adult hits
KCUT-LP	102.9 FM	Moab	Tunnel Vision Music	Rock
KCYN	97.1 FM	Moab	AZED 5 Communications, LLC	Country
KDUT	102.3 FM	Randolph	Alpha Media Licensee LLC	Regional Mexican
KDXU	890 AM	St. George	Townsquare License, LLC	News Talk Information
KDYL	1060 AM	South Salt Lake	Radio Activo 3 LLC	Spanish variety
KEGH	107.1 FM	Woodruff	Aerostar Communications, LLC	Spanish adult contemporary
KENZ	94.9 FM	Provo	Radio License Holding CBC, LLC	Top 40 (CHR)
KEYP	91.9 FM	Price	Biblical Ministries Worldwide	Christian
KEYR	91.7 FM	Richfield	Biblical Ministries Worldwide	Christian
KEYV	91.7 FM	Vernal	Biblical Ministries Worldwide	Christian
KEYY	1450 AM	Provo	Biblical Ministries Worldwide	Religious
KEZB	90.7 FM	Beaver	Beaver Radio	Christian
KFDJ	90.5 FM	Glendale	Advance Ministries Inc. d/b/a New Life Christian School	Christian
KFUR-LP	101.1 FM	St. George	Latinos Unidos Broadcasting	Regional Mexican
KGNT	103.9 FM	Smithfield	Frandsen Media Company, LLC	Classic hits
KHPD-LP	104.5 FM	Hurricane	City of Hurricane	
KHQN	1480 AM	Spanish Fork	Sace Broadcasting Corporation	Krishna Radio
KHTB	101.9 FM	Ogden	Radio License Holding CBC, LLC	Top 40 (CHR)
KIFX	98.5 FM	Naples	Evans Broadcasting, Inc.	Adult contemporary
KIHU	1010 AM	Tooele	Relevant Radio, Inc.	Catholic
KIXR	1400 AM	Provo	Sanpete County Broadcasting Co.	Sunday music/Talk
KIYK	107.3 FM	St. George	Townsquare License, LLC	Country
KJJC	1230 AM	Murray	Northwest Capital Corporation	Conservative talk
KJMY	99.5 FM	Bountiful	iHM Licenses, LLC	Hot adult contemporary
KKAT	860 AM	Salt Lake City	Radio License Holding CBC, LLC	Talk
KKLV	107.5 FM	Kaysville	Educational Media Foundation	Contemporary Christian
KKNB-LP	92.7 FM	Kanab	Kane County Sherriffs Office	
KKUT	93.7 FM	Mount Pleasant	Sanpete County Broadcasting Co.	Country
KLCY	105.5 FM	Vernal	Ashley Communications, Inc.	Country
KLGL	94.5 FM	Salina	Matrix Media, LLC	Hot adult contemporary
KLGN	1390 AM	Logan	Sun Valley Radio, Inc.	Sports
KLGU	90.3 FM	St. George	Educational Media Foundation	Contemporary Christian (K-Love)
KLO-FM	103.1 FM	Coalville	KLO Broadcasting Co.	Soft adult contemporary
KMES	1430 AM	Ogden	El Sembrador Ministries	Catholic
KMGR	99.1 FM	Nephi	Sanpete County Broadcasting Company	Soft adult contemporary
KMTI	650 AM	Manti	Sanpete County Broadcasting Company	Country
KMXD	100.5 FM	Monroe	Sanpete County Broadcasting Co.	Country
KNAH	101.5 FM	Oakley	Broadway Media LS, LLC	Country
KNEU	1250 AM	Roosevelt	Country Gold Broadcasting, Inc.	Country
KNIT	1320 AM	Salt Lake City	Hi-Line Radio Fellowship, Inc.	Christian talk and teaching
KNKL	88.1 FM	Tremonton	Educational Media Foundation	Contemporary Christian (K-Love)
KNRS	570 AM	Salt Lake City	iHM Licenses, LLC	News Talk Information
KNRS-FM	105.9 FM	Centerville	iHM Licenses, LLC	News Talk Information
KOAL	750 AM	Price	Eastern Utah Broadcasting Co.	News Talk Information
KODJ	94.1 FM	Salt Lake City	iHM Licenses, LLC	Classic hits
KOGN	1490 AM	Ogden	Positivia Radio, Inc.	Regional Mexican
KOHS	91.7 FM	Orem	Alpine School District Orem High School	Alternative
KONY	99.9 FM	St. George	Canyon Media Corporation	Country
KOSL	1550 AM	West Valley City	Barry Wood dba KRGO LLC	Oldies
KOUO-LP	92.9 FM	Orderville	Kane County Sherriffs Office	
KOVO	960 AM	Provo	Broadway Media LS, LLC	Sports (ESPN)
KPCW	91.7 FM	Park City	Community Wireless of Park City, Inc.	News Talk Information
KPGR	88.1 FM	Pleasant Grove	Alpine School District	Variety
KPGX	103.5 FM	Navajo Mountain	Across Nations	
KPLD	105.1 FM	Kanab	Canyon Media Corporation	Hot adult contemporary
KPUT	92.9 FM	Mona	Alex Media, Inc.	Alternative
KPVO	99.9 FM	Fountain Green	Iglesia Pentecostal Víspera del Fin	Spanish/Contemporary Christian
KQUT-LP	100.3 FM	St. George	Utah Local Radio	Variety
KRCL	90.9 FM	Salt Lake City	Listeners Community Radio of Utah, Inc.	Variety
KREC	98.1 FM	Brian Head	Townsquare License, LLC	Adult contemporary
KRPX	95.3 FM	Wellington	Eastern Utah Broadcasting Company	Hot adult contemporary
KRQX-FM	98.9 FM	Hurricane	Redrock Broadcasting, Inc.	Classic hits
KRSP-FM	103.5 FM	Salt Lake City	Bonneville International Corporation	Classic rock
KSFI	100.3 FM	Salt Lake City	Bonneville International Corporation	Adult contemporary
KSGO	1450 AM	St. George	Canyon Media Corporation	Conservative talk
KSL	1160 AM	Salt Lake City	Bonneville International Corporation	News Talk Information
KSL-FM	102.7 FM	Midvale	Bonneville International Corporation	News Talk Information
KSLL	1080 AM	Price	AJB Holdings, LLC	Country
KSOP-FM	104.3 FM	Salt Lake City	KSOP, Inc.	Country
KSUB	590 AM	Cedar City	Townsquare License, LLC	News Talk Information
KSUU	91.1 FM	Cedar City	Southern Utah University	Alternative
KSVC	980 AM	Richfield	Sanpete County Broadcasting Company	News Talk Information
KSVN	730 AM	Ogden	Azteca Broadcasting Corporation	Regional Mexican
KTCE	92.1 FM	Payson	Moenkopi Communications, Inc.	Hot adult contemporary
KTMP	1340 AM	Heber City	Sanpete County Broadcasting Co.	Country
KTUB	1600 AM	Centerville	Alpha Media Licensee LLC	Regional Mexican/Spanish sports
KUAA-LP	99.9 FM	Salt Lake City	Utah Arts Alliance	World Ethnic
KUAO	88.7 FM	North Ogden	Educational Media Foundation	Christian Worship (Air 1)
KUBL-FM	93.3 FM	Salt Lake City	Radio License Holding CBC, LLC	Country
KUDD	105.1 FM	American Fork	Broadway Media LS, LLC	Top 40 (CHR)
KUER-FM	90.1 FM	Salt Lake City	University of Utah	Public radio
KUEU	90.5 FM	Logan	University of Utah	Public radio
KUFR	91.7 FM	Salt Lake City	Family Stations, Inc.	Religious
KUHU	88.1 FM	Monticello	University of Utah	Public radio
KUKV	90.9 FM	Vernal	Educational Media Foundation	Contemporary Christian (K-Love)
KUMT	107.9 FM	Randolph	Brigham Young University	Talk
KUOU	89.3 FM	Roosevelt	University of Utah	Public radio
KUQU	93.9 FM	Enoch	University of Utah	Public radio
KURR	103.1 FM	Hildale	Media Advisors, LLC	Top 40 (CHR)
KUSK	88.5 FM	Vernal	Utah State University of Agriculture and Applied Science	Public radio
KUSL	89.3 FM	Richfield	Utah State University of Agriculture and Applied Science	Public radio
KUSR	89.5 FM	Logan	Utah State University of Agriculture and Applied Science	Public radio
KUST	88.7 FM	Moab	Utah State University of Agriculture and Applied Science	Public radio
KUSU-FM	91.5 FM	Logan	Utah State University of Agriculture and Applied Science	Public radio
KUTC	95.7 FM	Gunnison	Sanpete County Broadcasting Company	Classic rock
KUTN	96.7 FM	Levan	Sanpete County Broadcasting Co.	Oldies
KUTQ	102.3 FM	La Verkin	Redrock Broadcasting, Inc.	Country
KUTR	820 AM	Taylorsville	Truth Broadcasting Corporation	Contemporary Christian
KUTU	91.3 FM	Santa Clara	Utah Tech University	Variety
KUUB	88.3 FM	Salt Lake City	University of Utah	News Talk Information
KUUU	92.5 FM	South Jordan	Broadway Media LS, LLC	Rhythmic Adult Contemporary (days)/Rhythmic Contemporary (evenings)
KUXU	88.5 FM	Monroe	University of Utah	Public radio
KVEL	920 AM	Vernal	Ashley Communications, Inc.	News Talk Information
KVFX	94.5 FM	Logan	Sun Valley Radio, Inc.	Top 40 (CHR)
KVNU	610 AM	Logan	Sun Valley Radio, Inc.	News Talk Information
KVWJ-LP	94.9 FM	Hyrum	Alumni Records, Inc.	
KWBR-LP	105.7 FM	St. George	Association of Community Resources and News	Smooth jazz
KWLO	1580 AM	Springville	Iglesia Pentecostal Víspera del Fin	Spanish/Contemporary Christian
KWSA	100.1 FM	Price	AJB Holdings, LLC	Adult hits
KWUT	97.7 FM	Elsinore	Sanpete County Broadcasting Company	Country
KXBN	92.1 FM	Cedar City	Townsquare License, LLC	Top 40 (CHR)
KXEU	95.5 FM	Ballard	Hi-Line Radio Fellowship, Inc.	Christian
KXRK	96.3 FM	Provo	Broadway Media LS, LLC	Alternative rock
KXRQ	94.3 FM	Roosevelt	Uinta Broadcasting, L.C.	Hot adult contemporary
KXUT-LP	101.7 FM	Logan	Wasatch Radio	Country
KYFO-FM	95.5 FM	Ogden	Bible Broadcasting Network, Inc.	Conservative religious
KYMV	100.7 FM	Woodruff	Broadway Media LS, LLC	Adult hits
KZEZ	1490 AM	Santa Clara	Canyon Media Group, LLC	Oldies
KZHK	95.9 FM	St. George	Marvin Kent Frandsen	Classic rock
KZHT	97.1 FM	Salt Lake City	iHM Licenses, LLC	Top 40 (CHR)
KZMU	90.1 FM	Moab	Moab Public Radio, Inc.	Free Form Music, Local News
KZNS	1280 AM	Salt Lake City	Larry H. Miller Communications Corporation	Sports (FSR)
KZNS-FM	97.5 FM	Coalville	Larry H. Miller Communications Corporation	Sports (FSR)
KZYN	104.1 FM	Toquerville	Redrock Broadcasting, Inc.	Adult hits

== Defunct ==
- KCVD-LP
- KEMR
- KEPH
- KGVU
- KHKR
- KHUN
- KLGU-LP
- KLLB
- KNAK
- KNFL
- KOBY
- KSOP
- KSOS
- KTKK
- KWDZ
- KXOL
