= KXOL =

KXOL may refer to:

- KXOL (Utah), a defunct radio station (1660 AM) formerly licensed to serve Brigham City, Utah, United States
- KXOL-FM, a radio station (96.3 FM) licensed to serve Los Angeles, California, United States
- KMNY, a radio station (1360 AM) licensed to serve Hurst, Texas, United States, which used the call sign KXOL from 1947 to 1985
