= KNFL =

KNFL may refer to:

- KNFL (AM), a radio station (740 AM) licensed to serve Fargo, North Dakota, United States
- KNFL (Utah), a defunct radio station (1470 AM) formerly licensed to serve Tremonton, Utah, United States
- KDBI (AM), a defunct radio station (730 AM) formerly licensed to serve Boise, Idaho, United States, which held the call sign KNFL from 2013 to 2017
- Naval Air Station Fallon (ICAO code KNFL)
