= KOEZ =

KOEZ may refer to:

- KOEZ (FM), a radio station (104.1 FM) licensed to serve Ames, Iowa, United States
- KFUR-LP, a radio station (101.1 FM) licensed to serve St. George, Utah, United States, which held the call sign KOEZ-LP from 2001 to 2013
