= KFMR =

KFMR may refer to:

- KFMR (FM), a radio station (97.3 FM) licensed to serve Central Heights–Midland City, Arizona; see List of radio stations in Arizona
- KXEU, a radio station (95.5 FM) licensed to serve Ballard, Utah, United States, which held the call sign KFMR from 2005 to 2018
- KZON, a radio station (95.1 FM) licensed to serve Sun City West, Arizona, United States, which held the call sign KFMR from 1996 to 2005
- KQOD, a radio station (100.1 FM) licensed to serve Stockton, California, United States, which held the call sign KFMR from 1980 to 1994
- KXSC (FM), a radio station (104.9 FM) licensed to serve Sunnyvale, California, which held the call sign KFMR from 1964 to 1979
