= KEMR =

KEMR may refer to:

- KEMR (AM), a radio station (1090 AM) licensed to serve Milan, New Mexico, United States
- KEMR (Utah), a defunct radio station (102.1 FM) formerly licensed to serve Castle Dale, Utah, United States
- KVVF, a radio station (105.7 FM) licensed to serve Santa Clara, California, United States, which held the call sign KEMR in 2002 and from 2003 to 2004
- KSOL, a radio station (98.9 FM) licensed to serve San Francisco, California, which held the call sign KEMR from 2002 to 2003
