= Karb (disambiguation) =

Karb or KARB may refer to:

- Karb, a 2015 Pakistani television series.
- KARB, a radio station in Utah, United States.
- George J. Karb (1858-1937), mayor of Columbus, Ohio, United States
- KARB, the ICAO code for Ann Arbor Municipal Airport in Michigan, United States

== See also ==
- Carb (disambiguation)
