= KUTU (FM) =

- Santa Clara, Utah; United States
- Broadcast area: St. George, Utah
- Frequency: 91.3 MHz
- Branding: 91.3 The Blaze

Programming
- Format: Variety; rhythmic contemporary

Ownership
- Owner: Utah Tech University
- Sister stations: KQUT-LP (leased)

History
- First air date: 2009
- Former call signs: KXDS (2009–2022)
- Call sign meaning: Utah Tech University

Technical information
- Licensing authority: FCC
- Facility ID: 173065
- Class: C3
- ERP: 380 watts
- HAAT: 565 meters (1,854 ft)
- Transmitter coordinates: 36°50′49″N 113°29′28″W

Links
- Public license information: Public file; LMS
- Website: radiodixie913.com

KUTU (91.3-FM, "91.3 The Blaze") is a college radio station broadcasting a Variety format. Licensed to Santa Clara, Utah, United States, the station is owned by Utah Tech University, formerly known as Dixie State University.

Radio programming was reinstated from Dixie State in 2009, when a preview of KXDS' programming aired on KURR (103.1 FM) ahead of the launch of the 91.3 facility. The station was known as "Classical 91" and aired a classical music format. The classical format was dropped in 2012 as part of changes to increase student involvement.

In 2017, the university entered into a 10-year lease to expand to operating a low-power station in St. George, KDXI-LP 100.3. That station changed its call sign to KQUT-LP on June 29, 2022, in advance of Dixie State University changing its name officially to Utah Tech University on July 1. After reaching an agreement with the owner of KUTU-CD, a television station in Oklahoma, KXDS became KUTU on September 26, 2022.
