= KLLB =

Radio station in West Jordan, Utah, United States (1982–2017)

- West Jordan, Utah; United States
- Broadcast area: Salt Lake City, Utah
- Frequency: 1510 kHz

Programming
- Format: Defunct (formerly Gospel)

Ownership
- Owner: United Security Financial, Inc.
- Sister stations: KBJA, KTKK

History
- First air date: 1982; 44 years ago
- Last air date: May 2, 2017; 9 years ago
- Former call signs: KZZI (1981–1990)

Technical information
- Facility ID: 68865
- Class: D
- Power: 10,000 watts day 1,000 watts critical hours
- Transmitter coordinates: 40°33′6″N 111°58′17″W

KLLB (1510 AM) was a Christian/Gospel formatted radio station licensed to West Jordan, Utah. The station served the Salt Lake City area. The station was owned by United Security Financial, Inc.

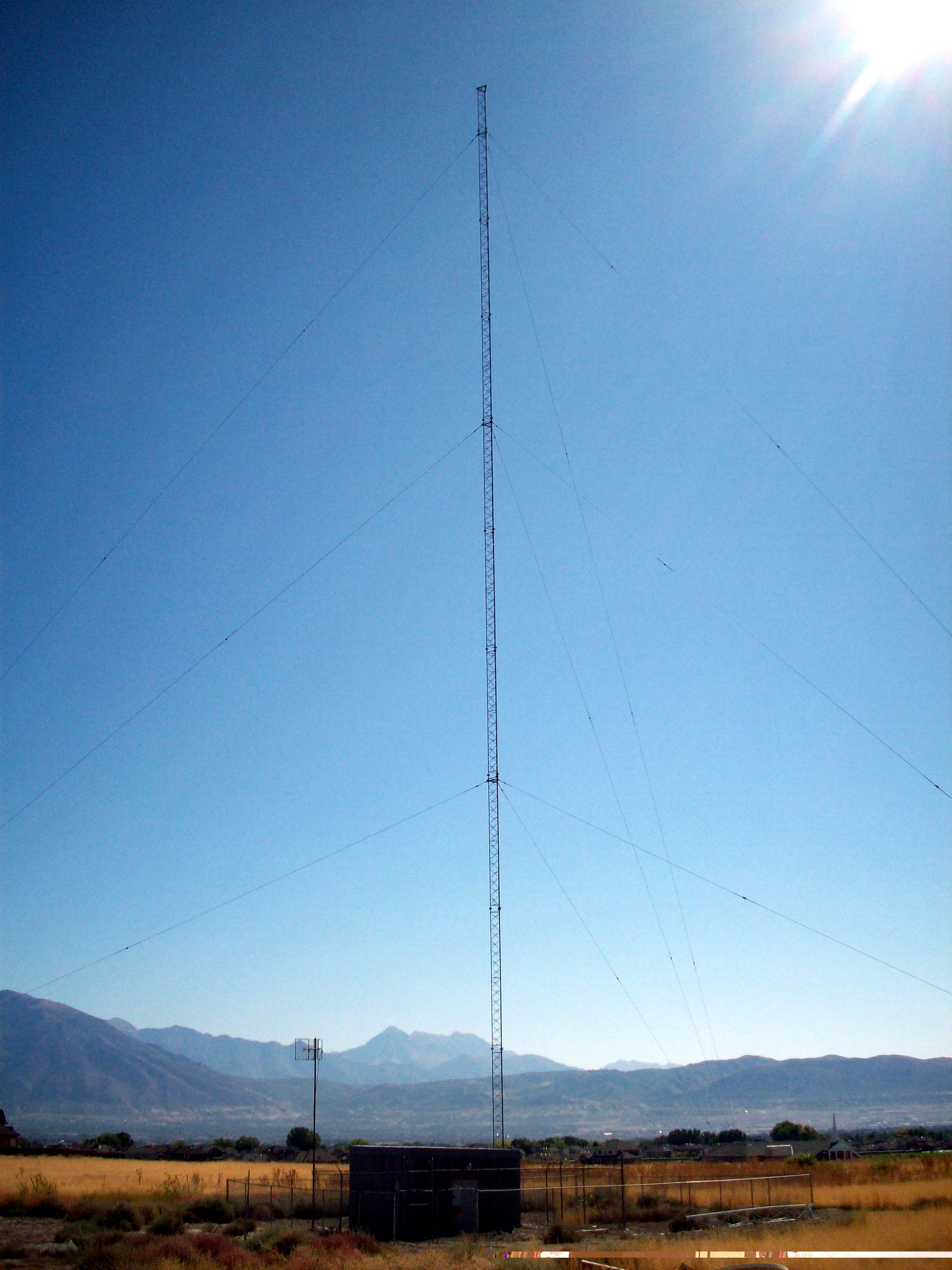
The KLLB tower in West Jordan, Utah.

The station signed off air every night, usually at or around local sunset. Other stations such as KGA from Spokane, Washington could be heard in its place. Because KGA was a Class A station until 2008, KLLB had to sign off at night to protect KGA's skywave service area from interference. Since the station's tower was constructed in the 1980s, a housing development had been built around the tower and ultimately a street will replace the land where the tower now stands. The station had applied for a construction permit to move its tower farther west near Utah State Route 111. This application has since been dismissed.

The station shared its tower with KTKK (630 AM) Sandy, Utah, whose tower was also coincidentally displaced due to a housing development. KTKK has since signed off the air.

== History ==
The station was assigned the call letters KZZI on December 7, 1981. The station began broadcasting in 1982. The first format on the station was Spanish Language Variety Music. The station switched to English Language talk radio, and at one point, adopted a Minnesota town (Madison, Minnesota) during a severe drought in the late 1980s. The station's listeners helped with a number of efforts. In December, 1987, Aryan Nations briefly broadcast an "Aryan Nations Hour" show but was canceled after station employees' lives were threatened and most of the station's sponsors pulled their advertising. The original owner sold the station in 1988, and it was sold again in 1990 to the final owner, United Security Financial, which is controlled by children of the late minister of the Faith Temple Church, known as "Mama." The studios were located in the basement of the church.

On February 15, 1990, the station changed its call sign to KLLB and adopted the gospel format. KLLB went silent on May 2, 2017; the tower was demolished in June. KLLB's license was surrendered on September 25, 2017, and cancelled on September 26 at the licensee's request.
