= KZYN =

Radio station in Toquerville, Utah

- Toquerville, Utah; United States
- Broadcast area: St. George, Utah; Mesquite, Nevada; Bunkerville, Nevada
- Frequency: 104.1 MHz
- Branding: 104.1 Jack FM

Programming
- Format: Adult hits
- Network: Jack FM
- Affiliations: Compass Media Networks

Ownership
- Owner: Redrock Media; (Redrock Broadcasting, Inc.)
- Sister stations: KCAY, KUTQ, KURR, KRQX-FM

History
- First air date: 2015 (as KSGX)
- Former call signs: KSGX (2015–2018)
- Call sign meaning: Zion National Park (former branding)

Technical information
- Licensing authority: FCC
- Facility ID: 198815
- Class: C1
- ERP: 14,000 watts
- HAAT: 610 meters (2,000 ft)
- Transmitter coordinates: 36°50′48″N 113°29′28″W
- Translator: (100.7 MHz) K264DD (Cedar City)

Links
- Public license information: Public file; LMS
- Webcast: Listen Live
- Website: 1041jackfm.net

KZYN (104.1 FM, "104.1 Jack FM") is a radio station licensed to Toquerville, Utah. Owned by Redrock Media, it broadcasts an adult hits format serving the St. George, Utah region.

== History ==
The station was assigned the KSGX call letters by the Federal Communications Commission on November 17, 2015.

On November 13, 2018, the station officially launched as adult album alternative Zion 104.1, adopting the call letters KZYN.

On April 6, 2026, KZYN flipped to adult hits as 104.1 Jack FM.
