= KMGR =

- Nephi, Utah; United States
- Broadcast area: Provo, Utah
- Frequency: 99.1 MHz
- Branding: Classy FM

Programming
- Format: Easy listening/Soft adult contemporary
- Affiliations: ABC News Radio

Ownership
- Owner: MId-Utah Radio; (Sanpete County Broadcasting Company)
- Sister stations: KKUT, KLGL, KMTI, KMXD, KUTC. KSVC, KWUT

History
- First air date: 1994
- Former call signs: KCDH (1988–1992); KYKN-FM (1992–2001); KFVR-FM (3/2001-10/2001); KCSL (2001–2002); KMDG (2002–2003); KUDE (2003–2017)
- Former frequencies: 103.9 MHz (1994–2016)

Technical information
- Licensing authority: FCC
- Facility ID: 72769
- Class: C1
- ERP: 100,000 watts
- HAAT: 297 meters
- Transmitter coordinates: 39°43′58″N 111°56′35″W
- Translators: 95.3 K237AE (Teasdale-Torrey); 96.7 K244DC (Panguitch); 102.3 K272BJ (Orderville); 102.7 K274AV (Rural Juab County); 103.9 K280CZ (Rural Garfield County)
- Repeaters: 95.7 KUTC-HD2 (Gunnison); 100.5 KMXD-HD2 (Monroe)

Links
- Public license information: Public file; LMS
- Webcast: Listen Live
- Website: midutahradio.com/kmgr/

KMGR (99.1 FM) is a radio station licensed to Nephi, Utah, United States. The station is broadcasting both easy listening and soft adult contemporary formats, and is an affiliate of ABC News Radio. It serves the Provo-Orem metropolitan area. The station is currently owned by Sanpete County Broadcasting Company.

== History ==
The station has had several call letters during its existence. The station started as a construction permit in 1988, not receiving its license to cover until 1994 as KYKN. KMGR itself switched frequencies from 103.9 to 99.1, as part of a complex swap of frequencies happening in Salt Lake City in 2016 and 2017.

The station has a construction permit to increase ERP to 100,000 watts, changing class type to C1; its present license is Class A. This would provide the station with coverage into Provo, Utah and parts of the southern Salt Lake valley.
