= KWUT =

- Elsinore, Utah; United States
- Broadcast area: Richfield, Utah
- Frequency: 97.7 MHz
- Branding: 97.7 The Wolf

Programming
- Format: Country
- Affiliations: Compass Media Networks

Ownership
- Owner: Douglas Barton; (Sanpete County Broadcasting Company)
- Sister stations: KKUT, KLGL, KMGR, KMTI, KMXD, KSVC, KUTC

History
- First air date: November 9, 1998 (as KRFD-FM)
- Former call signs: KRFD-FM (1998–1998); KSGI (1998–1999); KRFD (1999–2000); KACE (2000–2000); KMGR (2000–2000); KACE (2000–2000); KRFD (1999–2000); KLGL (2001–2005); KCYQ (2005–2010)

Technical information
- Licensing authority: FCC
- Facility ID: 137373
- Class: C
- ERP: 33,000 watts
- HAAT: 993 meters (3,258 ft)
- Transmitter coordinates: 38°32′30″N 112°03′31″W
- Translators: 94.3 K232AF (Orderville); 95.3 K237AD (Escalante); 98.1 K251AQ (Elsinore); 99.1 K256CD (Cedar City) (101.7 MHz) K269GH (Nephi); 101.9 K270BX (Milford); 102.9 K275BZ (Milford); 103.5 K278BZ (Marysvale); 105.9 K290BW (Parowan); 107.1 K296AR (Long Valley Junction)
- Repeater: 97.7 KWUT-FM2 (Beaver)

Links
- Public license information: Public file; LMS
- Webcast: Listen Live
- Website: midutahradio.com

KWUT (97.7 FM) is a radio station broadcasting a country music format. Licensed to Elsinore, Utah, United States, the station is currently owned by Douglas Barton, through licensee Sanpete County Broadcasting Company. KWUT's current branding is 97.7 The Wolf.

== History ==
According to the FCC call sign history, the station signed on with the call letters KRFD on November 9, 1999. On September 11, 1998, the station changed its call letters to KSGI, and then back to KRFD on November 1, 1999. On November 25, 2000, the station became KACE, and KMGR by December 31, 2000. On November 15, 2001 it switched to KACE and then back to KRFD on May 29, 2001. The station became KLGL on June 16, 2001. On August 8, 2005, the station flipped to KCYQ. The calls finally flipped again in the fall of 2010, to the current call letters.
