= KUTQ =

- La Verkin, Utah; United States
- Broadcast area: St. George, Utah
- Frequency: 102.3 MHz
- Branding: 102.3 Zion Country

Programming
- Format: Country
- Affiliations: Premiere Networks

Ownership
- Owner: Redrock Media; (Redrock Broadcasting, Inc.)
- Sister stations: KCAY, KZYN, KRQX-FM, KURR

History
- First air date: 2013 (as KCDC)
- Former call signs: KCDC (2009–2015)
- Call sign meaning: "Utah's Q" (former branding)

Technical information
- Licensing authority: FCC
- Facility ID: 166049
- Class: C0
- ERP: 13,500 watts
- HAAT: 1,035 meters (3,396 ft)
- Transmitter coordinates: 38°31′9″N 113°17′7″W

Links
- Public license information: Public file; LMS
- Webcast: Listen Live
- Website: 1023zioncountry.com

KUTQ (102.3 FM, "102.3 Zion Country") is a radio station licensed to La Verkin, Utah. Owned by Redrock Media, it broadcasts a country music format serving the St. George, Utah area.

== History ==
The station was originally licensed to Cohise Broadcasting as KCDC; in 2015, Redrock Media acquired the then-silent station for $375,000.

In November 2015, the station began on-air testing, and subsequently launched as New Country Q102.3 with the new calls KUTQ. The station later changed its branding to Coyote 102.3.

On March 31, 2025. KUTQ rebranded as 102.3 Real Country, pivoting from its previous hot country positioning to a gold-based presentation. On April 6, 2026, KUTQ rebranded again as 102.3 Zion Country. This came after sister station KZYN dropped its own "Zion" branding (after Zion National Park) in favor of Jack FM.
