= KKUT =

- Mount Pleasant, Utah; United States
- Broadcast area: Provo, Utah
- Frequency: 93.7 MHz (HD Radio)
- Branding: 93.7 The Wolf

Programming
- Format: Country
- Subchannels: HD2: Classic hits "The Peak"; HD3: Oldies "Flashback 96.7"
- Affiliations: Compass Media Networks

Ownership
- Owner: Mid-Utah Radio; (Sanpete County Broadcasting Co.)
- Sister stations: KLGL, KMGR, KMTI, KMXD, KUTC, KSVC, KWUT

History
- First air date: January 26, 1981 (as KKWZ)
- Former call signs: KKWZ (1981–1997); KCYQ (1997–2005); KLGL (2005–2012); KUTC (2012–2016)

Technical information
- Licensing authority: FCC
- Facility ID: 41895
- Class: C
- ERP: 48,000 watts
- HAAT: 709 meters (2326 feet)
- Transmitter coordinates: 39°51′15″N 111°42′20″W
- Translators: HD2: 92.9 K225AP (Heber City); HD3: 96.7 K244DH (Saratoga Springs); 98.3 K252DB (Provo); 103.3 K277CG (Parowan); 106.3 K292GM (Milford)
- Repeater: 93.7 KKUT-FM1 (Heber City)

Links
- Public license information: Public file; LMS
- Webcast: Listen Live; Listen Live (HD2); Listen Live (HD3)
- Website: hebervalleyradio.com flashback967.com (HD3)

KKUT (93.7 FM) is a radio station licensed to serve Mount Pleasant, Utah and serving the Provo metropolitan area. The station is owned by Mid-Utah Radio and licensed to Sanpete County Broadcasting Co. The format is known as 93.7 The Wolf. The station's transmitter is located southeast of Mount Pleasant, Utah, at an elevation of 2,896 meters (9,501 feet) above sea level near Nebo Loop Road. The station has been assigned these call letters by the Federal Communications Commission since March 1, 2016.

The current KKUT signed on October 1, 2013 using the nickname 'Sky FM', and has aired a hot adult contemporary format.

== History ==
The station was previously known as KKWZ, beginning on January 26, 1981. On April 18, 1997, the station changed its call sign to KCYQ, on August 8, 2005 to KLGL, on November 9, 2012 to KUTC, and on March 1, 2016 to the current KKUT.

Originally licensed to serve Richfield, Utah, the station was licensed to serve Mount Pleasant on August 21, 2013.

On September 19, 2016 KKUT changed their format from hot adult contemporary to country, branded as "93.7 The Wolf".

KKUT broadcasts in HD Radio.
