= Carb =

Carb or CARB may refer to:

- Carbohydrate, a simple molecule
- Carburetor, a device that blends air and fuel for an internal combustion engine
- California Air Resources Board, in the government of California, US

== See also ==
- Carb Day
- Karb (disambiguation)
