= KNEU =

Radio station in Roosevelt, Utah, USA

- Roosevelt, Utah; United States
- Broadcast area: Uintah Basin
- Frequency: 1250 kHz
- Branding: KNEU FM 93.5 & AM 1250

Programming
- Format: Country music

Ownership
- Owner: Country Gold Broadcasting, Inc.
- Sister stations: KIFX

Technical information
- Licensing authority: FCC
- Facility ID: 14062
- Class: D
- Power: 5,000 watts day 129 watts night
- Transmitter coordinates: 40°17′13″N 109°57′32″W
- Translators: K228FR (93.5 MHz, Roosevelt)

Links
- Public license information: Public file; LMS
- Website: Official Website

KNEU (1250 AM, "KNEU FM 93.5 & AM 1250") is a radio station broadcasting a country music format. Licensed to Roosevelt, Utah, United States of America, the station is currently owned by Evans Family Media

The call letters were formerly owned by the carrier current radio on-campus radio station at Northeast Missouri State University.

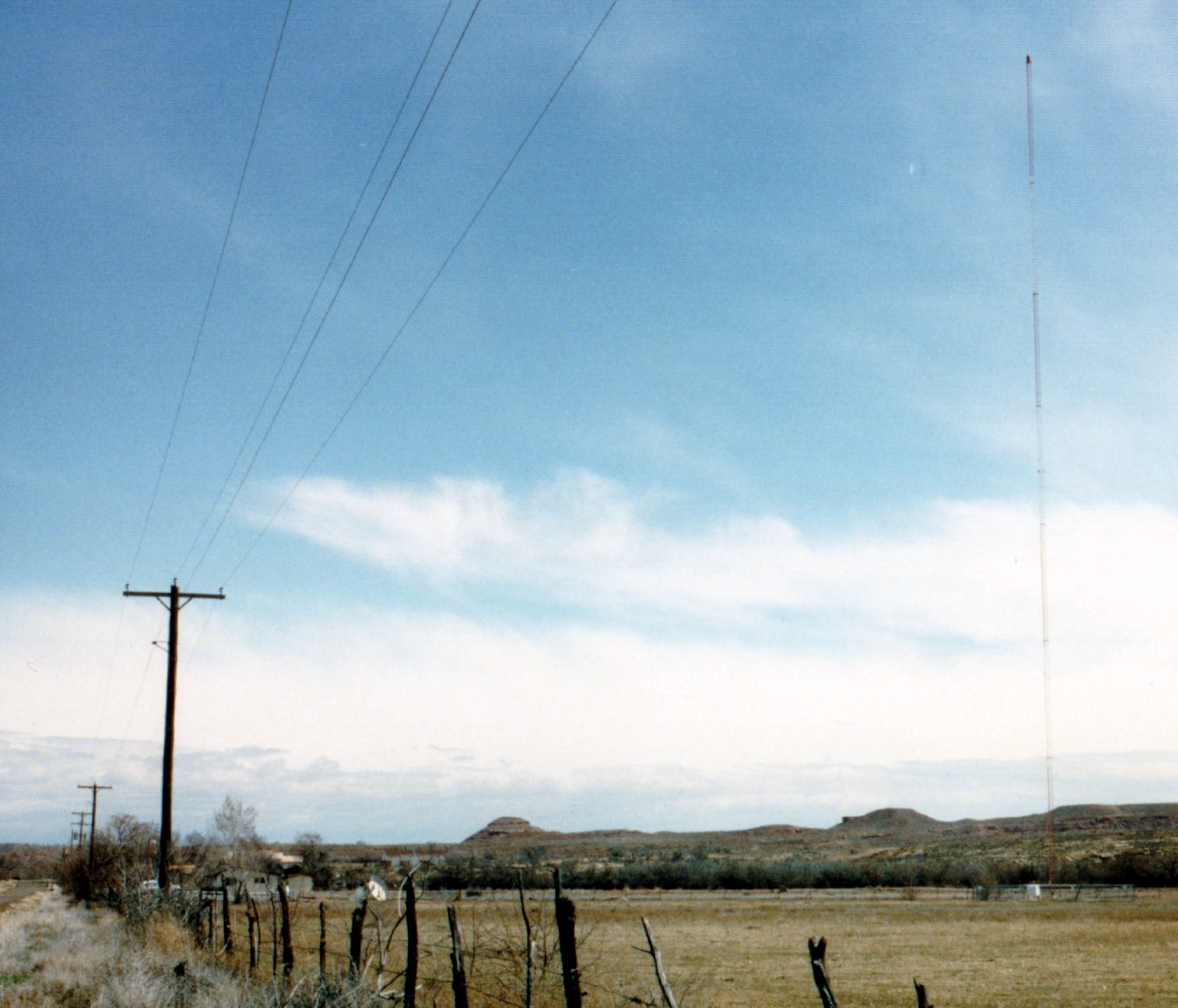
The radio tower for KNEU is actually located in Uintah County, near Ballard, Utah.
