= KRQX-FM =

Radio station in Hurricane, Utah

- Hurricane, Utah; United States
- Broadcast area: St. George, Utah; Mesquite, Nevada; Bunkerville, Nevada
- Frequency: 98.9 MHz
- Branding: 98.9 Kool FM

Programming
- Format: Classic hits
- Affiliations: Compass Media Networks; United Stations Radio Networks

Ownership
- Owner: Redrock Media; (G. Craig Hanson)
- Sister stations: KCAY; KZYN; KUTQ; KURR

History
- First air date: 1999 (as KBZB)
- Former call signs: KAXA (1997–1999); KBZB (1999–2010)

Technical information
- Licensing authority: FCC
- Facility ID: 78999
- Class: C1
- ERP: 14,500 watts
- HAAT: 620 meters (2,030 ft)
- Transmitter coordinates: 36°50′49″N 113°29′28″W

Links
- Public license information: Public file; LMS
- Webcast: Listen live
- Website: www.redrock.fm/kool-989/

KRQX-FM (98.9 MHz) is an American radio station licensed to serve the community of Hurricane, Utah. The station is owned by G. Craig Hanson, through licensee Redrock Broadcasting, Inc.

The station was assigned the KBZB call letters by the Federal Communications Commission on May 26, 1999. The station began regular broadcast operations in August 1999.

== Ownership ==
From August 1999 to January 2003, KBZB was owned and operated by broadcast engineer and consultant Mark C. Nolte. The station, branded as "98.9 The Buzz," carried a classic rock/oldies music format with a locally produced live morning show.

In February 2003, Gla-Mar Broadcasting LLC (Gregory Merrill, managing member) reached an agreement to purchase KBZB from Mark C. Nolte for a reported sale price of $429,000. At the same time, Gla-Mar entered into a time brokerage agreement to operate the station, pending FCC approval of the sale.

In November 2003, 3 Point Media-Nevada LLC reached an agreement to purchase KBZB from Gla-Mar Broadcasting for a reported sale price of $1.962 million. The principal owners of 3 Point Media-Nevada LLC are Chris Devine and Bruce Buzil. At the time of the announcement, 3 Points Media LLC owned 7 other radio stations but none in the Pioche market. This license transfer was approved by the FCC on January 26, 2004, but as of February 2008 the station is still listed in the FCC database as licensed to Gla-Mar Broadcasting LLC.

On September 29, 2006, the FCC issued a Notice of Apparent Liability for Forfeiture against Gla-Mar Broadcasting, LLC, for willful and repeated violations of FCC rules by failing to ensure the operational readiness of KBZB's Emergency Alert System equipment. The commission found Gla-Mar Broadcasting liable for forfeiture in the amount of $8,000.

According to documents filed with the FCC in December 2008, Gla-Mar Broadcasting stipulated that they are in default on a loan agreement with CBL Investments, LLC, and asked the FCC to assign the license of KBZB to CBL as partial extinguishment of that debt. CBL Investments, LLC is a part of a complex series of ownership agreements that are all associated with Simmons Media Group of Salt Lake City, Utah. The FCC approved the transfer on March 4, 2009 and the transaction was completed March 9, 2009.

Redrock Broadcasting acquired KRQX-FM from CBL Investments effective April 17, 2015, at a purchase price of $250,000.

On July 12, 2016 KRQX rebranded as "Kool 98.9", with no other changes.
