= KCPX =

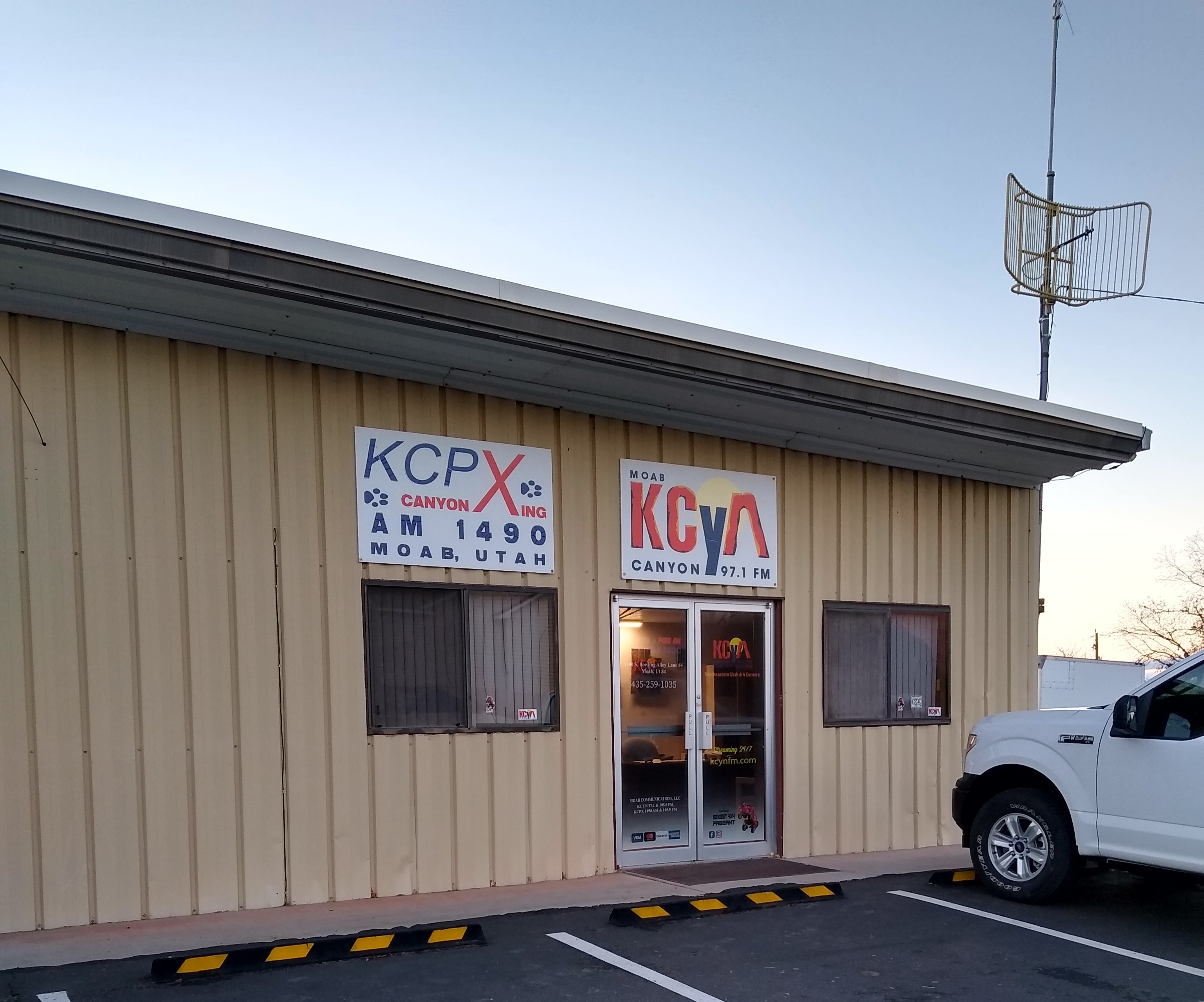
- KCPX and sister station KCYN in Moab
- Spanish Valley, Utah; United States
- Broadcast area: Moab, Utah
- Frequency: 1490 kHz
- Branding: The Point

Programming
- Format: News/talk
- Affiliations: Premiere Networks

Ownership
- Owner: William Craig Knott; (AZED 5 Communications, LLC)
- Sister stations: KCYN

History
- First air date: 2009
- Call sign meaning: Taken from the former KCPX radio in Salt Lake City, which had been owned by Columbia Pictures (ColPiX)

Technical information
- Licensing authority: FCC
- Facility ID: 160408
- Class: C
- Power: 1,000 watts
- Transmitter coordinates: 38°28′4″N 109°26′18″W
- Translator: 105.9 K290CS (Moab)

Links
- Public license information: Public file; LMS
- Website: kcynfm.com

KCPX (1490 AM) is a news/talk formatted broadcasting radio station. Licensed to Spanish Valley, Utah, United States, the station is currently owned by William Craig Knott, through licensee AZED 5 Communications, LLC.

Former logo

The station airs some of programs from a state-wide network. One of those programs is Western Life Radio which airs twice daily.

== History ==
The KCPX call letters have a long history in Utah. Originally, they were featured on a radio station in Salt Lake City, which broadcast on 1320. That station is now KNIT. KCPX originally started as a construction permit in 2004. KCPX came under new management in 2020.
