= KLGL =

Radio station in Salina, Utah

Coordinates: 39.3212°N 111.7704°W

- Salina, Utah; United States
- Broadcast area: Richfield, Utah
- Frequency: 94.5 MHz
- Branding: 94.5 The Eagle

Programming
- Format: Hot AC
- Affiliations: Compass Media Networks

Ownership
- Owner: Mid-Utah Radio; (Sanpete County Broadcasting Co.)
- Sister stations: KKUT, KMGR, KMTI, KMXD, KUTC, KSVC, KWUT

History
- First air date: 2012
- Call sign meaning: "Eagle"

Technical information
- Licensing authority: FCC
- Facility ID: 181075
- Class: C
- ERP: 66,000 watts
- HAAT: 718 meters (2,356 ft)
- Translators: 93.3 K255DB (Manti); 99.3 K257DL (Ticaboo); 100.1 K261BP (Rural Piute); 101.7 K269DQ (Orderville); 102.3 K272CI (Wayne County); 103.1 K276CU (Panguitch); 104.3 K282BD (Orderville); 106.3 K292EE (Hanksville); 106.3 K292DO (Rural Garfield)
- Repeater: 94.5 KLGL-FM1 (Nephi)

Links
- Public license information: Public file; LMS
- Webcast: Listen live
- Website: midutahradio.com

KLGL (94.5 FM) is a radio station licensed to Salina, Utah, and owned by Sanpete County Broadcasting Co. The station's format consists of modern adult contemporary music. KLGL is also heard on 10 translators throughout Utah.

The signal boasts an effective radiated power of 66,000 watts and is intended to serve a large region, with its total coverage area spanning at least ten counties in Central and Southern Utah.

== History ==
Prior to 2012: The KLGL call sign previously belonged to a station operating at 93.7 FM in nearby Richfield, Utah.
