= KMXD =

Radio station in Monroe–Richfield, Utah

- Monroe, Utah; United States
- Broadcast area: Richfield, Utah
- Frequency: 100.5 MHz (HD Radio)
- Branding: KVSC 980 AM & 100.5

Programming
- Format: Talk radio
- Subchannels: HD2: KMGR (Soft AC)
- Affiliations: Westwood One

Ownership
- Owner: Mid-Utah Radio; (Sanpete County Broadcasting Co.)
- Sister stations: KSVC, KKUT, KWUT, KLGL, KMGR, KUTC, KMTI

History
- First air date: 2008

Technical information
- Licensing authority: FCC
- Facility ID: 164258
- Class: C
- ERP: 33,000 watts (HD Radio)
- HAAT: 993 meters
- Transmitter coordinates: 38°23′7.9″N 112°19′59.7″W
- Translators: (98.1 MHz) K251BV (Nephi); (99.3 MHz) K257AZ (Richfield); (99.7 MHz) K259AR (Fillmore); HD2: (107.5 MHz) K298AW (Beaver)

Links
- Public license information: Public file; LMS
- Webcast: Listen live
- Website: midutahradio.com

KMXD (100.5 FM) is a radio station broadcasting a talk format, licensed to Monroe, Utah. The station is owned by Sanpete County Broadcasting Co.

KMXD's primary format is Talk, which is simulcast with its sister AM station, KSVC (980 AM), creating the branding "KSVC 980 AM & 100.5 FM." The station's programming is affiliated with Westwood One.

KMXD's sister station KMGR, which is carried on its HD2 channel, was involved in a significant shuffle of radio stations in the Salt Lake City market in 2016 and 2017.

KMXD started as a construction permit in 2005, earning its license to cover in 2008.
