= KOAL =

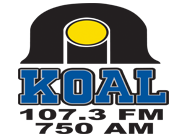
- Price, Utah; United States
- Broadcast area: Central Utah
- Frequency: 750 kHz (HD Radio)
- Branding: 107.3 FM 750 AM Newstalk Sports

Programming
- Format: News/Talk
- Affiliations: Motor Racing Network; Performance Racing Network

Ownership
- Owner: Eastern Utah Broadcasting Co.
- Sister stations: KARB, KRPX

History
- First air date: 1939
- Former call signs: KEUB (1936-1945)

Technical information
- Licensing authority: FCC
- Facility ID: 18389
- Class: B
- Power: 10,000 watts day 6,800 watts night
- Transmitter coordinates: 39°34′0.9″N 110°48′4.6″W
- Translator: 107.3 MHz (K297BV)

Links
- Public license information: Public file; LMS
- Webcast: Listen Live
- Website: www.castlecountryradio.com

KOAL (750 AM) is a radio station broadcasting a news/talk format. Licensed to Price, Utah, United States, the station is currently owned by Eastern Utah Broadcasting Co.

750 AM is a United States and Canadian clear-channel frequency.

== History ==
KOAL is one of the oldest radio stations in central Utah, signing on in 1936. The station's original call sign was KEUB, standing for Eastern Utah Broadcasting. KEUB was founded by three original owners: Jack Richards, Frank Carman, and Sam Weis. The call letters were changed from KEUB to KOAL in 1945. At sign on in 1936, the station was on 1450 AM, moving to 1230 with the call change in 1945. In 1996, the station moved to 750 allowing it to become a regional station. Its current format dates to 1992. Early formats included music, farm reports, and request shows. One of KOAL's on air staff, Bob Mullens, who later worked with the Deseret News went on to win a Pulitzer Prize for reporting. KOAL celebrated 80 years broadcasting in 2016.

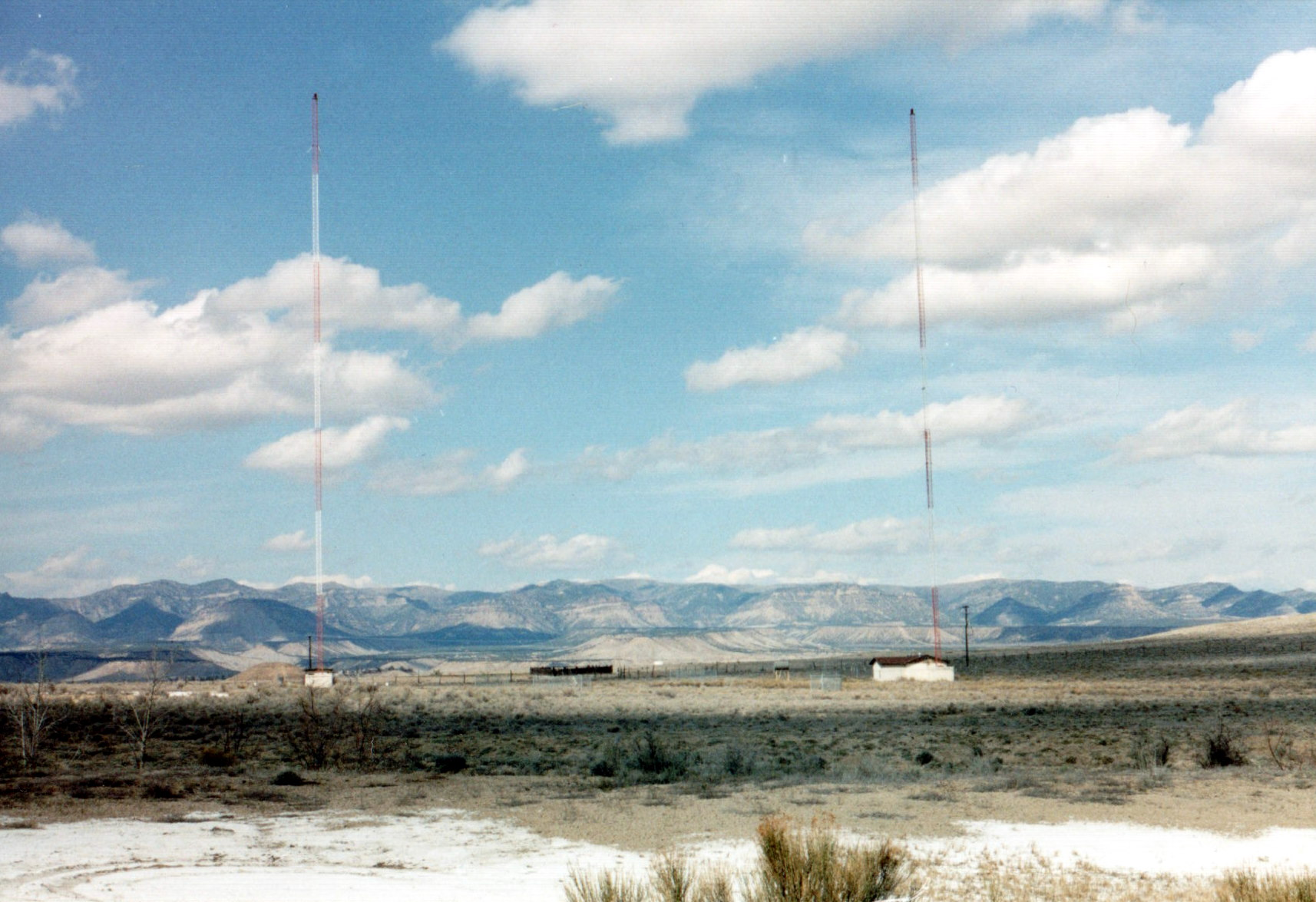
The radio towers for KOAL AM 750.

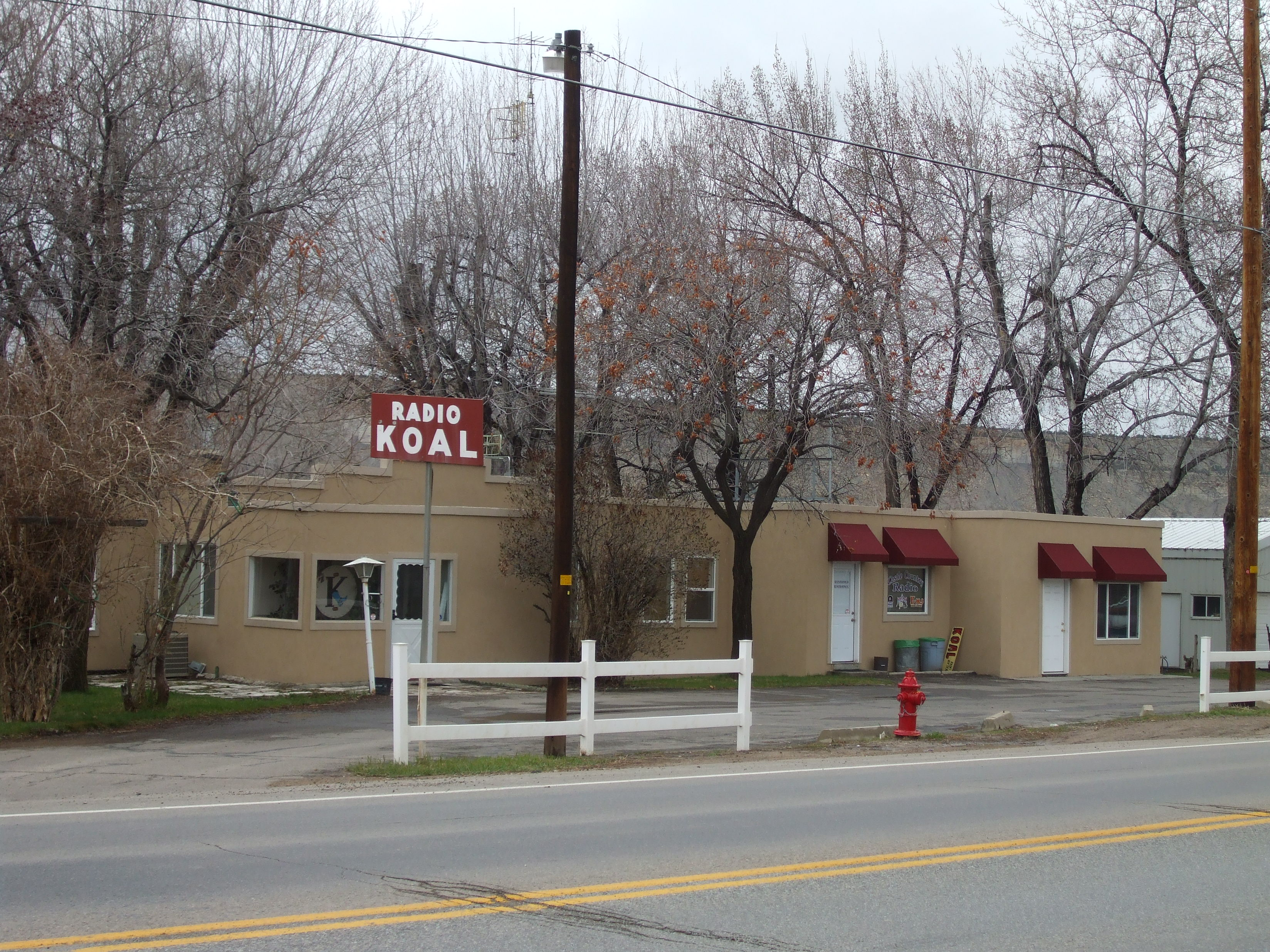
KOAL studio, in Carbonville, Utah
