= KMTI =

- Manti, Utah; United States
- Frequency: 650 kHz
- Branding: KMTI Country

Programming
- Format: Classic country
- Affiliations: Premiere Networks

Ownership
- Owner: Sanpete County Broadcasting Company
- Sister stations: KKUT, KLGL, KMGR, KMXD, KSVC, KUTC, KWUT

History
- First air date: 1975
- Call sign meaning: Manti

Technical information
- Licensing authority: FCC
- Facility ID: 59035
- Class: B
- Power: 10,000 watts (day); 900 watts (night)
- Transmitter coordinates: 39°17′38.9″N 111°38′15.7″W
- Translators: 95.1 K236BE (Manti); 100.9 K265FM (Nephi); 102.1 K271DB (Gunnison); 106.7 K294DH (Joseph)

Links
- Public license information: Public file; LMS
- Webcast: Listen live
- Website: midutahradio.com

KMTI (650 AM) is a radio station broadcasting a country music format. Licensed to Manti, Utah, United States, the station is currently owned by Sanpete County Broadcasting Company. KMTI shares ownership with several other local stations, including KSVC (980 AM) in Richfield, forming the primary source of regional news and information for Central Utah.

== History ==
The station was originally licensed and began broadcasting on the frequency 1340 kHz in 1975, which was changed to 1590 in 1979.

In November 1988, KMTI received a construction permit from the FCC to change its frequency to the current 650 kHz. This change allowed the station to increase its daytime power to 10,000 watts, greatly expanding its coverage across Central Utah.

In the late 1980s, before its full transition to Classic Country, KMTI's programming included Country music features and updates on the genre.

KMTI's low dial position and higher power allow it to travel farther distances. The station's skywave signal extends between 300 and 600 miles away. KMTI has previously conducted intentional DX (long-distance) tests to allow hobbyists, known as DXers, to log the station far outside its Central Utah service area. The station has been verified as far away as Minnesota.

KMTI is broadcasting on 95.1 FM via translator K236BE, licensed to Manti, on 100.9 FM via translator K265, licensed to Nephi, on 102.1 FM via translator K271DB, licensed to Gunnison, and on 106.7 FM via translator K294DH, licensed to Joseph.
