= KLCY =

- Vernal, Utah; United States
- Broadcast area: Uintah Basin
- Frequency: 105.5 MHz
- Branding: Eagle Country

Programming
- Format: Country

Ownership
- Owner: Ashley Communications, Inc.
- Sister stations: KVEL

History
- First air date: May 1, 1975
- Former call signs: ???? (1975–1980); KUIN-FM (1980–1987); KUIN (1987–1991); KLCY-FM (1991–2008)

Technical information
- Licensing authority: FCC
- Facility ID: 2935
- Class: C2
- ERP: 3,300 watts
- HAAT: 518 meters (1701 feet)
- Transmitter coordinates: 40°32′16″N 109°41′57″W

Links
- Public license information: Public file; LMS
- Webcast: Listen Live
- Website: basinnow.com/klcy

KLCY (105.5 FM) is a Country formatted radio station licensed to serve Vernal, Utah. The station is owned by Ashley Communications, Inc. It airs a country music format. The station is involved in a number of charitable and community projects.

== Translators ==
Call sign	Frequency	City of license	FID	ERP (W)	Class	FCC info
K280CZ	103.9 FM	Garfield County, Utah	23198	17	D	LMS
K286BL	105.1 FM	Vernal, Utah		10	D	
