= KTKK =

DKTKK
- Sandy, Utah; United States
- Broadcast area: Salt Lake City, Utah
- Frequency: 630 kHz
- Branding: K-Talk 630

Programming
- Format: Defunct (formerly News/Talk)

Ownership
- Owner: United Broadcasting; (United Broadcasting Company, Inc)
- Sister stations: KBJA

History
- First air date: 1960
- Last air date: May 1, 2017
- Former call signs: KSXX, KZJO
- Call sign meaning: "Talk"

Technical information
- Facility ID: 14890
- Class: B
- Power: 1,000 watts (day); 500 watts (night)
- Transmitter coordinates: 40°33′6″N 111°58′17″W

Links
- Webcast: Listen Live
- Website: ktalkmedia.com

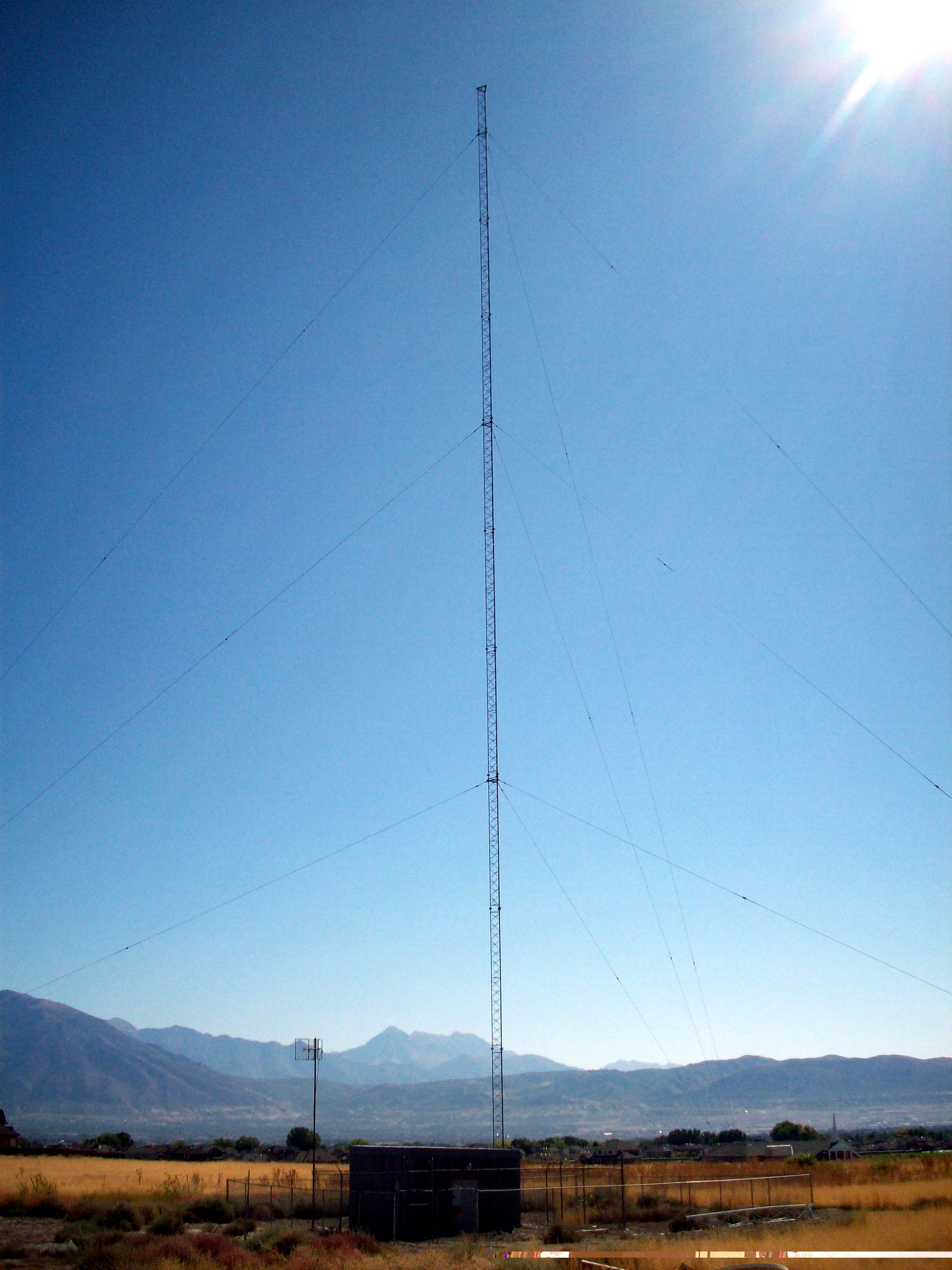
The radio tower for KTKK was located in West Jordan, Utah. It was shared with KLLB. It has since been demolished making way for a new street.

KTKK (630 AM) was a news/talk radio station broadcasting out of Sandy, Utah, to the Salt Lake City area. Called, "K-Talk 630", it was locally owned by United Broadcasting Company. The station featured local talk, including women's interest, political and other subjects live for over 18 hours every day.

In April 2017, the station began simulcasting on 1640 KBJA, also licensed to Sandy, just prior to a switch to exclusively broadcasting on 1640 full-time on May 1, 2017.

== History ==
The station had previously gone under several call signs in its past. At its inception, the station was known as KSXX. During the early 1960s, the station played music, becoming a talk station in 1965. It previously only operated during the day only, but was later allowed to continue broadcasting during the night in 1979 by construction of a four tower directional array. On June 21, 1982 the station changed its format and call sign to KZJO, broadcasting contemporary hits identifying itself as "63 Joe." Six months later, the station changed formats again, back to talk radio and on August 5, 1985, the station changed its call sign to KTKK.

The station's previous towers were displaced by a housing development. It later shared tower space with KLLB which broadcasts from a tower in South Jordan, Utah. Ironically, the KLLB tower might be demolished due to another housing development.

KTKK applied to the Federal Communications Commission (FCC) to move to new towers near North Salt Lake, Utah, but the application was dismissed. The station also had an application to change its community of license to Kearns, Utah, and reduce daytime and nighttime power levels. The station would also gain three towers for a directional array as opposed to the single tower it had in South Jordan.

On March 17, 1997 the FCC announced that eighty-eight stations had been given permission to move to newly available "Expanded Band" transmitting frequencies, ranging from 1610 to 1700 kHz, with KTKK authorized to move from 630 kHz to 1640 kHz.

The FCC's initial policy was that both the original station and its expanded band counterpart could operate simultaneously for up to five years, after which owners would have to turn in one of the two licenses, depending on whether they preferred the new assignment or elected to remain on the original frequency, although this deadline was extended multiple times. On May 1, 2017, KTKK permanently signed off, moving all programming to KBJA at 1640 AM. The KTKK license was surrendered on September 27, 2017, and cancelled by the FCC on September 28, 2017.

== Past hosts ==
- Van Hale
- Kathy Herman
- Herb Jepko
- G. Gordon Liddy
- Martin Davies
- Mills Crenshaw
- Barbara Jean Whiteley
- Mike Gallagher
- Mark Maxon
- Jim Kirkwood
- Jim Sumpter
- Paul Duane
- Craig Scott
- Donovan
- Donald Packard
- Bob Lesh
- Kay Henry
- S.P. Romney
