= KWSA =

- Price, Utah; United States
- Broadcast area: Price and Surrounding Area
- Frequency: 100.1 MHz
- Branding: 100.1 Jack FM

Programming
- Format: Adult hits
- Affiliations: Cumulus Media

Ownership
- Owner: Against the Wind Broadcasting, Inc.
- Sister stations: KSLL

History
- First air date: July 10, 1985 (as KPRQ)
- Former call signs: KPRQ (1985–2002)

Technical information
- Licensing authority: FCC
- Facility ID: 15528
- Class: A
- ERP: 3,000 watts
- HAAT: 41 meters
- Transmitter coordinates: 39°32′42″N 110°48′57″W

Links
- Public license information: Public file; LMS
- Webcast: Listen Live
- Website: 100.1 Jack FM

KWSA (100.1 FM) is a radio station broadcasting an adult hits format. Licensed to Price, Utah, United States, the station is currently owned by Jeff Wood and Against the Wind Broadcasting, Inc. and features programming from Cumulus Media.

== History ==
The station went on the air as KPRQ on July 10, 1985. On June 21, 2002, the station changed its call sign to the current KWSA.

On January 1, 2020, KWSA flipped from adult contemporary to adult hits and rebranded as "100.1 Jack FM". In August, 2025, the station's "Grand In Your Hand" promotion helped gather baby supplies for a pregnancy center.
