= KIFX =

- Naples, Utah; United States
- Frequency: 98.5 MHz
- Branding: The Fox FM 98.5

Programming
- Format: Adult contemporary
- Affiliations: ABC Radio, Citadel Broadcasting

Ownership
- Owner: Evans Broadcasting
- Sister stations: KNEU

History
- First air date: 1987-06-11 (as KBWL)
- Former call signs: KBWL (1987–1991)
- Call sign meaning: Fox

Technical information
- Licensing authority: FCC
- Facility ID: 20023
- Class: C2
- ERP: 3,200 watts
- HAAT: 515 meters (1,690 ft)
- Transmitter coordinates: 40°32′16″N 109°41′57″W

Links
- Public license information: Public file; LMS

KIFX (98.5 FM) is a radio station broadcasting an adult contemporary format. Licensed to Naples, Utah, United States, the station is currently owned by Evans Broadcasting, Inc. and features programming from ABC Radio.

== History ==
The station was known as KBWL, beginning on 11 June 1987. On 1 September 1991, the station changed its call sign to the current KIFX.
