= KDYL (AM) =

- South Salt Lake, Utah; United States
- Broadcast area: Salt Lake City, Ogden, Provo, Utah
- Frequency: 1060 kHz
- Branding: Radio 1060 AM "La Mejor"

Programming
- Format: Spanish Variety

Ownership
- Owner: Eric Palacios; (Radio Activo 3 LLC)
- Sister stations: KXLI; KADD

History
- First air date: September 2, 1967 (as KRSP)
- Former call signs: KRSP (1967–1990); KKDS (1990–2004)
- Call sign meaning: K-Dial (as in radio dial)

Technical information
- Licensing authority: FCC
- Facility ID: 27458
- Class: D
- Power: 10,000 watts day; 149 watts night
- Transmitter coordinates: 40°32′7.8″N 112°4′40.8″W

Links
- Public license information: Public file; LMS

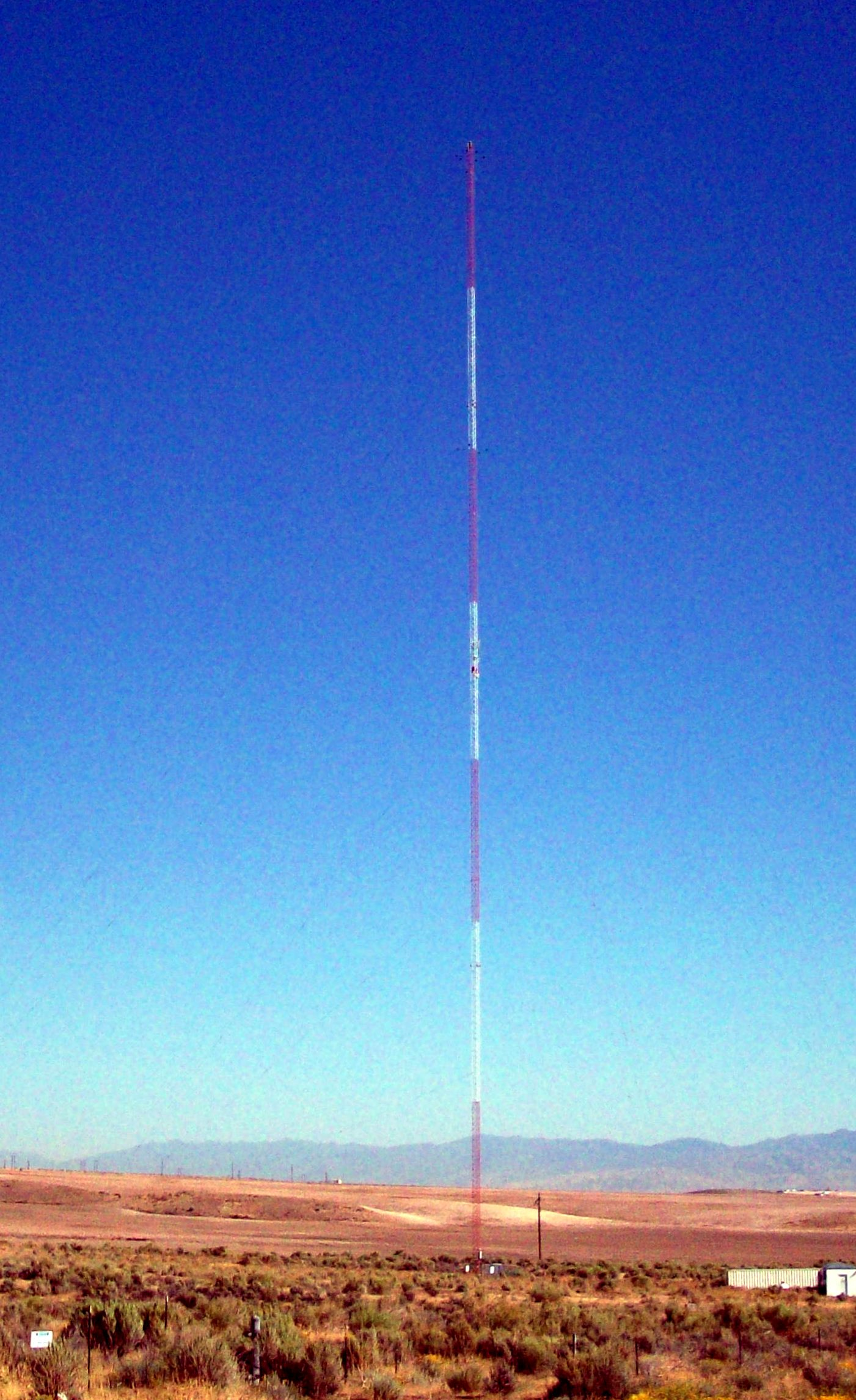
The radio tower for KDYL is located near the Bingham Canyon Mine.

KDYL (1060 kHz) is an AM radio station licensed to South Salt Lake, Utah broadcasting a Spanish variety format. The station is owned by Eric Palacios, through licensee Radio Activo 3 LLC.

The station broadcasts with 10,000 watts by day. Because AM 1060 is a clear channel frequency, after sunset KDYL must reduce power to 149 watts so it does not interfere with Class A stations XEEP, located near Mexico City, and KYW in Philadelphia. The transmitter is located off Bacchus Highway near Lark, Utah.

== History ==
=== Early years ===
The station began broadcasting on September 2, 1967, as KRSP. Until the mid-1980s, the station aired a contemporary hits format, simulcast with its FM sister station KRSP-FM. By 1986, the station had begun airing separate programming from KRSP-FM, carrying an oldies format, playing music from the 1950s and 1960s. The station was branded "Utah's Oldies Station".

=== Children's radio ===
On September 24, 1990, the station changed its call sign to KKDS It began broadcasting a children's radio format branded "The Imagination Station", with programming from the Orlando-based "Kids' Choice Broadcasting Network". KKDS was the first radio station aimed at children in the nation. The station later affiliated with the children's network Radio AAHS.

=== Adult standards ===
On November 12, 1997, the Radio AAHS affiliation ended, and the station began airing an adult contemporary and oldies format branded "All American Classics". By 2000, the station's format had changed to adult standards. In 2004, Holiday Broadcasting Co filed for the call sign KDYL, which had been used by a series of Salt Lake City-area stations beginning in 1922, and was previously held by AM 1280 while that station aired an adult standards format. On February 2, 2004, the station's call sign was changed to KDYL. In June 2005, KDYL began broadcasting the Jones Radio Networks' "Music of Your Life" adult standards format. Later, the station carried a syndicated adult standards format from Westwood One.

=== Real Oldies 1060 ===
Station's logo as Real Oldies 1060

On January 1, 2008, the station switched to an oldies format known as "Real Oldies" with live and local personalities, spotlighting hits from the mid-1950s through the mid-1960s. The change put the station in competition with 860 KKAT, which was an affiliate of Scott Shannon's True Oldies Channel. Unlike the True Oldies Channel, KDYL's playlist included only a small amount of post-1970 music. KKAT would eventually change formats, making KDYL the only pre-1970 oldies station in the Salt Lake metro area.

=== Oldies leaves Salt Lake AM radio ===
On March 4, 2013, KDYL changed formats to music, talk and news in Mandarin and English, with programming from China Radio International after Mountain View Broadcast began operating the station under a time brokerage agreement. In 2015, Mountain View Broadcast purchased the station from Holiday Broadcasting Co. for $712,000, which included $525,000 it had paid in brokerage fees over the previous two years.

On December 1, 2017, KDYL changed formats to music, talk and news in South Asian and English from Radio Desi USA, after SSS Broadcasting LLC began operating the station under a time brokerage agreement.

=== Spanish-language programming ===
On January 1, 2019, KDYL began simulcasting KFUR-LP from St. George, Utah, branded "Radio Unica", under a time brokerage agreement. The Radio Unica programming ended on January 1, 2020, after which KDYL broadcast soft rock classics, new age music, and classic hits for a short period of time. On April 23, 2020, KDYL went silent.

On November 18, 2020, an application for assignment of license was submitted to the FCC for approval after KDYL was sold. According to the asset purchase agreement filed with the FCC, the sale price for KDYL is $50,000. On January 8, 2021, the application for assignment of license was approved by the FCC. The sale of KDYL was consummated on April 9, 2021, and the license was voluntarily reassigned from Mountain View Broadcast, LLC, to Radio Activo 3, LLC. The assignment of license was granted by the FCC on April 11, 2021.

On June 18, 2021, KDYL returned to the air with a mixture of automated lite rock music and Spanish pop music. According to a recent post in a Utah radio discussion group, the station's new owner planned to air a Spanish language format on KDYL in the near future. On June 21, 2021, KDYL went silent again after testing over the Juneteenth weekend. As of February 25, 2022, KDYL remained off the air due to technical problems with the station's transmitter. However, there have been several reports of KDYL periodically testing its transmitter since November 12, 2021. On March 10, 2022, KDYL returned to the air with a Spanish language format. The station went silent again at the end of March 2022 because of lightning damage to transmitter power supplies, and it remains off the air as of May 5, 2022. On May 27, 2022, KDYL began broadcasting a Regional Mexican format branded as "Radio Unica 1060". It subsequently rebranded as Radio 1060 AM "La Mejor", with a Spanish variety Format.
