= KURR =

- Hildale, Utah; United States
- Broadcast area: St. George; Mesquite, Nevada
- Frequency: 103.1 MHz
- Branding: MIX 103.1

Programming
- Format: CHR/Top 40
- Affiliations: Premiere Networks

Ownership
- Owner: Redrock Media; (Media Advisors, LLC)
- Sister stations: KCAY, KZYN, KUTQ, KRQX-FM

Technical information
- Licensing authority: FCC
- Facility ID: 164147
- Class: C
- ERP: 100,000 watts
- HAAT: 595.0 meters (1,952.1 ft)
- Transmitter coordinates: 36°50′49″N 113°29′28″W
- Translator: 92.5 K223CN (Cedar City)

Links
- Public license information: Public file; LMS
- Webcast: Listen Live
- Website: mix1031.fm

KURR (103.1 FM) is a radio station broadcasting a CHR/Top 40 format. Licensed to Hildale, Utah, United States, until November 2008, the station relayed 99.9 KONY Country to the Hurricane, Utah area and then aired Christmas music; shortly after Christmas it started broadcasting Adult Hits under the moniker "George FM". As of February 2010, the station was named "Mix 103.1"
