= KQUT-LP =

Radio station in St. George, Utah

- St. George, Utah; United States
- Broadcast area: St. George area
- Frequency: 100.3 MHz
- Branding: Radio St. George

Programming
- Format: Variety

Ownership
- Owner: Utah Local Radio

History
- First air date: 2006
- Former call signs: KTIM-LP (2003–2015); KDXI-LP (2015–2022)
- Former frequencies: 101.9 MHz (2006–2012); 95.3 MHz (2012–2015)

Technical information
- Licensing authority: FCC
- Facility ID: 124360
- Class: L1
- ERP: 100 watts
- HAAT: -105 meters
- Transmitter coordinates: 37°7′45.00″N 113°35′46.00″W

Links
- Public license information: LMS
- Website: radiostgeorge.com

KQUT-LP (100.3 FM) is a low-power FM radio station in St. George, Utah, United States. It is owned by Utah Local Radio and leased to Utah Tech University, which operates it as a companion to university-owned KUTU (91.3 FM).

== History ==
The station went on the air as KTIM-LP on September 26, 2006, owned and operated by Wastecon Environmental Inc., a non-profit 501c3 environmental education organization.

On March 28, 2011, it was reported to the FCC that the station had gone silent for reasons unknown.

The station changed its call sign to KDXI-LP on February 26, 2015. The station went silent at that time to move its transmitter to Webb Hill. However, there was related infighting and a schism on Wastecon's board, including the possible replacement of the board without its knowledge; the president of Wastecon noted that he planned to relocate the station to Dixie State University.

Wastecon sold the station to Utah Local Radio effective August 30, 2016, for $2,500, the value of the station's equipment. In 2017, Utah Local Radio entered into a 10-year lease with Dixie State University, now Utah Tech University—owner of KUTU (91.3 FM)—to provide operating functions and allow for some student management; the format changed to a mix of classical and jazz music. The call sign changed to KQUT-LP on June 29, 2022, in advance of the renaming of Dixie State to Utah Tech on July 1.
