= KSLL =

- Price, Utah; United States
- Broadcast area: Central Utah
- Frequency: 1080 kHz
- Branding: True Country 104.9 & AM 1080

Programming
- Format: Country
- Affiliations: Citadel Media

Ownership
- Owner: Ajb Holdings, LLC
- Sister stations: KWSA

History
- First air date: 1980

Technical information
- Licensing authority: FCC
- Facility ID: 41579
- Class: D
- Power: 10,000 watts day; 5,000 watts critical hours
- Transmitter coordinates: 39°33′43″N 110°46′36″W
- Translator: 104.9 K285AB (Price)

Links
- Public license information: Public file; LMS
- Webcast: Listen Live
- Website: True Country 104.9 & 1080 AM

KSLL (1080 AM) is a radio station broadcasting a country music format. Licensed to Price, Utah, United States, the station serves the Central Utah area. The station is currently owned by Ajb Holdings, LLC.

KSLL's skywave signal has been reported in Salt Lake City, Utah and Green River, Wyoming KSLL's studios are shared with its sister KWSA on Main Street in Price.

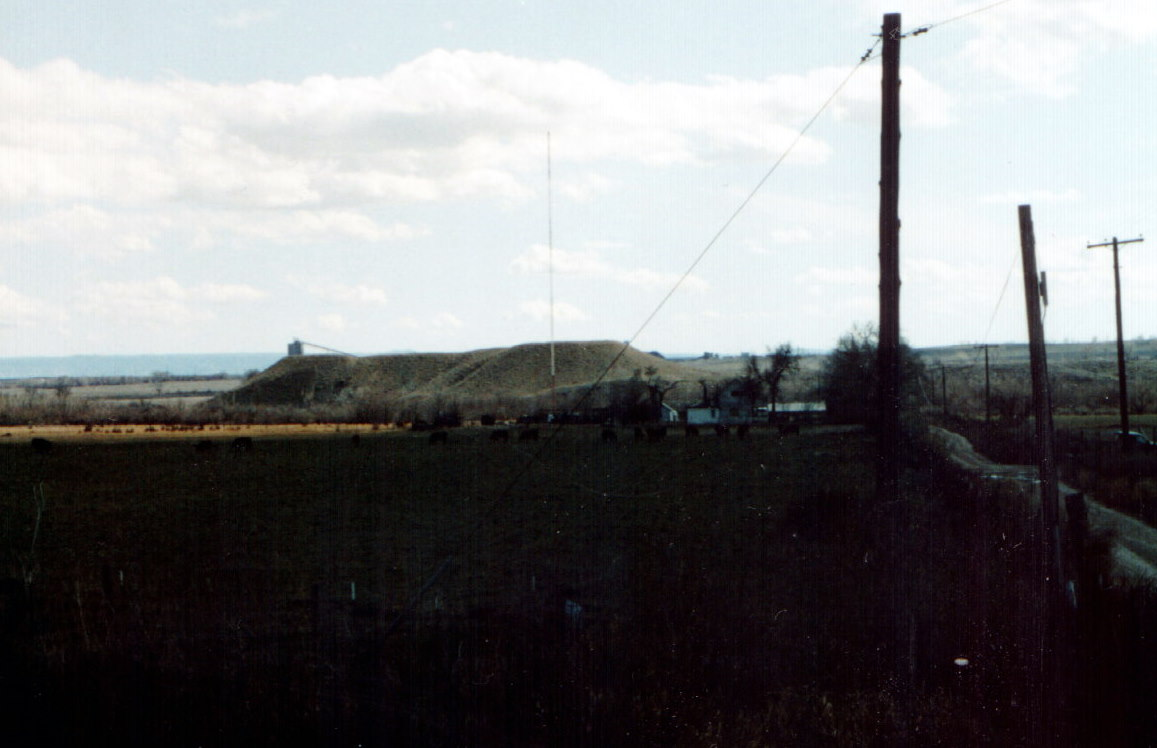
The broadcast tower for KSLL, located near Wellington, Utah.

KSLL was listed as one of the critical media outlets for emergencies in Carbon County in a 2018 Pre-Disaster mitigation plan.

1080 AM is a United States clear-channel frequency, on which KOAN in Anchorage, Alaska, KRLD in Dallas, Texas, and WTIC in Hartford, Connecticut share Class A status. KSLL must leave the air between sunset and sunrise to protect the nighttime skywave signals of the Class A stations.

== History ==
KSLL started as a construction permit for a station in South Salt Lake City, then known as KRPX. The station was then moved to Price, Utah, signing on in the mid-1980s.

== FM translator ==
The KSLL (1080 kHz) True Country signal is relayed to an FM translator; this translator provides the listener with the choice of FM 24 hours per day with stereophonic high fidelity sound.

Broadcast translator for KSLL
Call sign	Frequency	City of license	FID	ERP (W)	HAAT	Class	FCC info
K285AB	104.9 FM	Price, Utah	2439	250	614 m (2,014 ft)	D	LMS
