= Spanish Valley, Utah =

- CDP
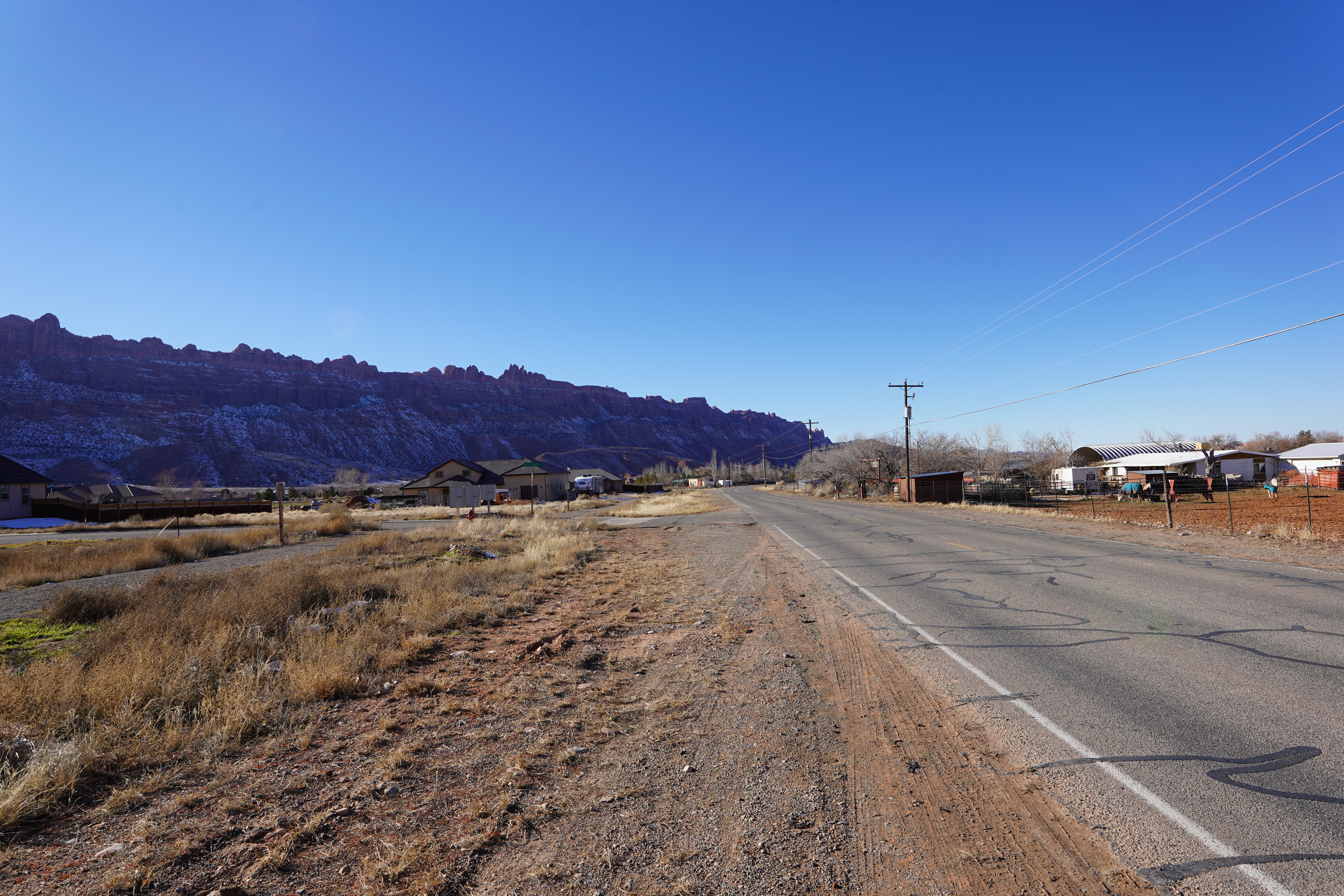

- Location in San Juan County and the state of Utah.
- Coordinates: 38°27′50″N 109°24′15″W
- Country: United States
- State: Utah
- County: San Juan

Area
  - Total: 14.2 sq mi (36.9 km^{2})
  - Land: 14.2 sq mi (36.9 km^{2})
  - Water: 0 sq mi (0.0 km^{2})
- Elevation: 5,131 ft (1,564 m)

Population (2020)
  - Total: 529
  - Density: 37.1/sq mi (14.3/km^{2})
- Time zone: UTC-7 (Mountain (MST))
  - Summer (DST): UTC-6 (MDT)
- FIPS code: 49-71455
- GNIS feature ID: 2408786

The United States Census Bureau defines Spanish Valley as a census-designated place (CDP) in San Juan County, Utah, United States. In common usage, Spanish Valley typically refers to the geographic valley that extends south of the city of Moab, most of which lies within Grand County, the northern neighbor of San Juan County. Maps of the area, for example, label the whole valley—not just the portion in San Juan County—as Spanish Valley. The population at the 2020 census was 529.

== Geography ==
According to the U.S. Census Bureau, the CDP has a total area of 14.3 square miles (36.9 km^{2}), all land.

== Demographics ==
Historical population
| Census | Pop. | Note | %± |
|---|---|---|---|
| 2010 | 491 | | — |
| 2020 | 529 | | 7.7% |

Returns from the 2010 census show that 491 people resided in the CDP that year. Estimates from the 2017 American Community Survey indicated that the area had a population of 594. American Community Survey data from between 2013 and 2017 indicates that the area had 185 housing units.

American Community Survey data from 2013 to 2017 indicated the area's median age in 2017 was 30.2 years, with a margin of error of 17.3 years. Seven years prior, the census showed that this figure was 54.9 years, with a margin of error of 8.3 years.

Five-year survey estimates from 2013 to 2017 showed that 96% of the residents (573 people) were White; the other 4% (21 people) were Hispanic or Latino.

The area's median income during the 2013 to 2017 time period is not available, but survey estimates showed that 11.9% of the population lived below the poverty level during that time.
