= KXEU =

- Ballard, Utah; United States
- Frequency: 95.5 MHz

Programming
- Network: Your Network of Praise

Ownership
- Owner: Hi-Line Radio Fellowship, Inc.

History
- First air date: 2008
- Former call signs: KFMR (2005–2018)

Technical information
- Licensing authority: FCC
- Facility ID: 164261
- Class: C2
- ERP: 890 watts
- HAAT: 506 meters (1,660 ft)
- Transmitter coordinates: 40°32′15.8″N 109°41′59.5″W

Links
- Public license information: Public file; LMS

KXEU (95.5 FM) is a radio station licensed to Ballard, Utah, United States. The station is owned by Hi-Line Radio Fellowship, Inc., and is part of its Your Network of Praise, a regional Christian radio network.

This station began broadcasting as KFMR in 2008 but immediately went off the air due to what it claimed were unfinalized programming plans. The station was sold from SkyWest Media to Cochise Media Licenses, owned by the original licensee's father, in 2009. To settle multiple violations involving stations with minimal on-air records, Cochise entered into a consent decree in 2017 whereby it surrendered nine radio stations, with KFMR going to Hi-Line Radio Fellowship.

== History ==
=== Launch ===
This station received its original construction permit for a new station at 95.7 MHz to serve the community of Marbleton, Wyoming, from the Federal Communications Commission on April 21, 2005. The new station was assigned the KFMR call sign by the FCC on August 19, 2005.

On April 8, 2008, the FCC authorized a change for the still-under construction station in broadcast frequency to 95.5 MHz and in community of license to Ballard, Utah—roughly 200 miles south of Marbleton, Wyoming. KFMR received its license to cover from the FCC on June 10, 2008.

=== Falling silent ===
On July 17, 2008, KFMR's owners notified the FCC that the station had fallen silent on June 10, 2008—the very day it had received its broadcast license—over programming issues. In their application, SkyWest Media requested authority to remain silent "until it has finalized and implemented its programming plans". The Commission granted this authority on December 18, 2008, with an expiration date of June 11, 2009. As a matter of law, if KFMR was unable to resume broadcasting within one year of going dark), it would be liable to forfeit its broadcast license.

On June 8, 2009, having been on the air briefly to beat the looming one-year deadline, the station reported to the FCC that it had fallen silent once again, this time on June 6, 2009, and this time for "financial" reasons. It requested a new authorization to remain silent and as of August 2009 the FCC has accepted this application for filing but taken no further action.

=== Proposed sale ===
In July 2009, SkyWest Media, LLC, reached an agreement to sell this station to Cochise Media Licenses, LLC, as part of a three-station deal in exchange for $552,000 in debt forgiveness. SkyWest Media is owned by Ted Tucker Jr. and Cochise Media Licenses is owned by his father, Ted Tucker Sr. This application was accepted for filing on July 13, 2009, but as of August 2009 the Commission had taken no further action on the application.

=== Planned surrender of license; donation ===
On May 26, 2017, the Federal Communications Commission released an order regarding two Consent Agreements reached with Cochise Broadcasting LLC and Cochise Media Licenses LLC to settle multiple violations at ten stations. Under the agreements nine licenses, including KFMR's, were to be surrendered.

Effective December 28, 2017, Cochise Media donated KFMR's license to Hi-Line Radio Fellowship, Inc. The station changed its call sign to KXEU on January 17, 2018.
