= KEYY =

Radio station in Provo, Utah

- Provo, Utah; United States
- Broadcast area: Salt Lake City metropolitan area
- Frequency: 1450 KHz
- Branding: Key Radio

Programming
- Format: Christian Radio
- Affiliations: Moody Broadcasting Network

Ownership
- Owner: Biblical Ministries Worldwide
- Sister stations: See § Repeaters and translators

History
- First air date: December 1949
- Former call signs: KNEU (1949–1952)
- Call sign meaning: "Key"

Technical information
- Licensing authority: FCC
- Facility ID: 5201
- Class: C
- Power: 1,000 watts unlimited
- Transmitter coordinates: 40°13′49″N 111°41′12″W
- Translator: See § Repeaters and translators
- Repeater: See § Repeaters and translators

Links
- Public license information: Public file; LMS
- Webcast: Listen Online
- Website: keyradio.org

KEYY (1450 AM) is a Christian radio station licensed to Provo, Utah, United States. The station is broadcasting via a translator on 91.3 FM in Provo as well. The station is owned by Biblical Ministries Worldwide, a Christian organization.

== History ==
The station began broadcasting in December 1949, and originally held the call sign KNEU. The station was owned by Mid-Utah Broadcasting. In 1952, the station's call sign was changed to KEYY. The station aired a MOR format in the early 1970s. By the mid-1970s, the station had adopted a top 40 format. By 1980, the station was airing an adult contemporary format. By 1983, the station had begun airing the Music of Your Life adult standards format. The station had returned to an adult contemporary format by 1985. In 1986, the station was donated to Touch Outreach Ministries, and in 1987 the station began airing its current Christian format. The station was sold to Biblical Ministries Worldwide the following year.

== Repeaters and translators ==
In 2010, KEYY began to be simulcast on 91.7 KEYR in Richfield, Utah and 91.9 KEYP in Price, Utah, and in 2011 it began to simulcast on 91.7 KEYV in Vernal, Utah. In 2016, Biblical Ministries Worldwide purchased 91.3 K217CL in Provo, Utah, which would begin simulcasting KEYY. In 2017, a translator for KEYY was licensed, broadcasting at 95.5 MHz in Payson, Utah.

Call sign	Frequency	City of license	Class	ERP (W)	Height (m (ft))
KEYP	91.9 FM	Price, Utah	C2	2,000	590 m (1,940 ft)
KEYR	91.7 FM	Richfield, Utah	C1	850	956 m (3,136 ft)
KEYV	91.7 FM	Vernal, Utah	C3	910	499 m (1,637 ft)

Broadcast translators for KEYY
Call sign	Frequency	City of license	FID	ERP (W)	HAAT	Class	FCC info
K217CL	91.3 FM	Provo, Utah	63467	250	−192 m (−630 ft)	D	LMS
K238CE	95.5 FM	Payson, Utah	156665	50	672 m (2,205 ft)	D	LMS
