= KVEL =

- Vernal, Utah; United States
- Frequency: 920 kHz

Programming
- Format: News/Talk
- Affiliations: Premiere Networks; Salem Radio Network; Townhall News; Westwood One

Ownership
- Owner: Ashley Communications, Inc.
- Sister stations: KLCY

History
- First air date: January 19, 1947

Technical information
- Licensing authority: FCC
- Facility ID: 2934
- Class: B
- Power: 5,000 watts day 1,000 watts night
- Transmitter coordinates: 40°29′30″N 109°31′45″W
- Repeater: 104.5 K283BN (Vernal)

Links
- Public license information: Public file; LMS
- Webcast: Listen Live
- Website: basinnow.com/kvel

KVEL (920 AM) is an News/Talk formatted radio station. Licensed to Vernal, Utah, United States, the station is currently owned by Ashley Communications, Inc.

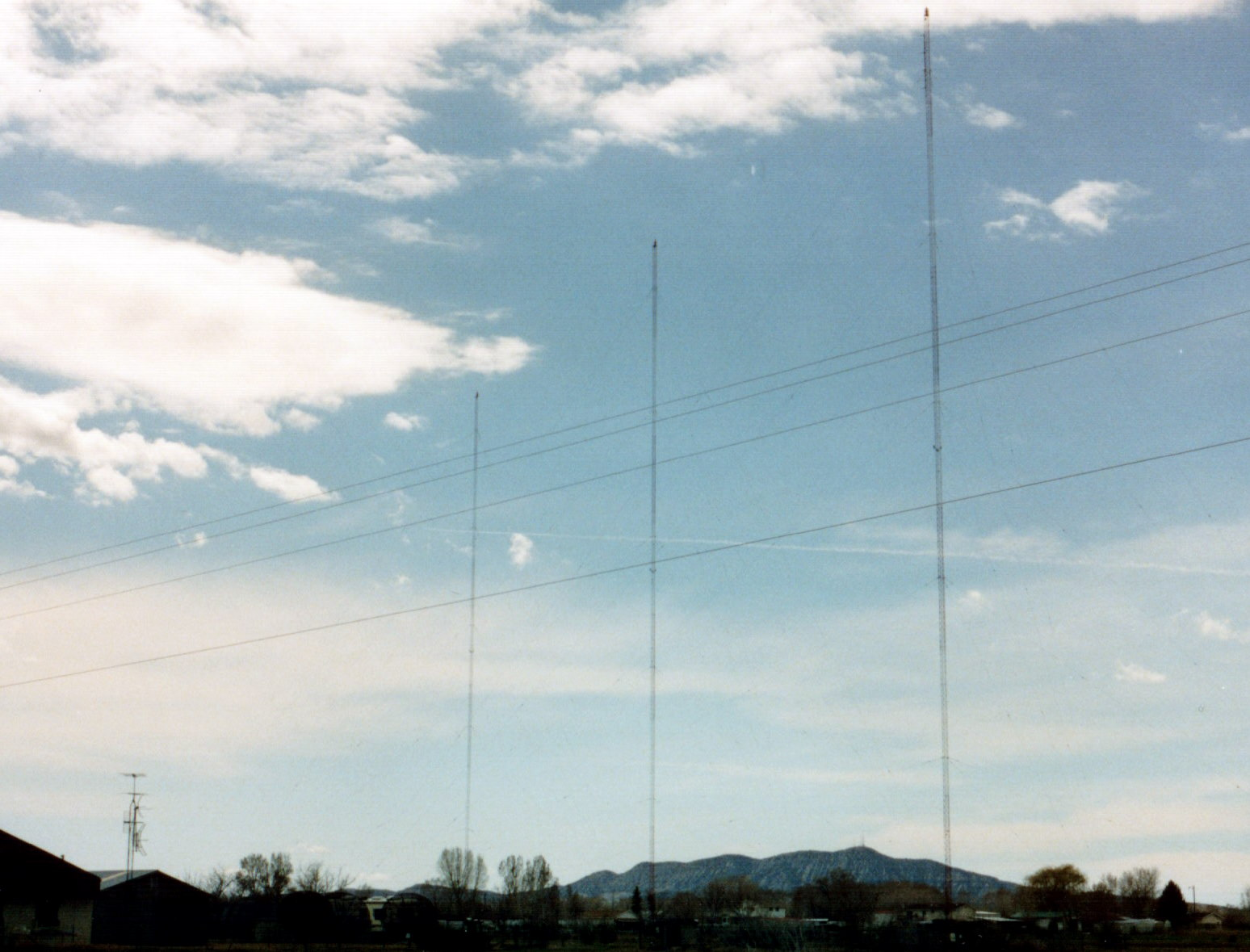
KVEL's radio towers are located outside of Vernal, Utah.

Programs on the station include Coast to Coast AM, segments from ESPN Radio and games of the Utah Jazz. In addition to carrying ESPN, KVEL carries segments from Fox Sports Radio.

KVEL was originally on 1340 kHz and moved to 1250 kHz in 1957. It moved to 920 kHz in 1971.
