= KOGN =

Radio station in Ogden, Utah

- Ogden, Utah; United States
- Frequency: 1490 kHz

Programming
- Format: Silent, was Regional Mexican

Ownership
- Owner: Marcos Rivas and Ruth de Alba; (Positivia Radio, Inc.)

History
- First air date: April 1948 (as KVOG)
- Former call signs: KVOG (1948–1978); KJQN (1978–1993); KJOE (1993–1994); KYFO (1994–2006)
- Call sign meaning: Ogden

Technical information
- Licensing authority: FCC
- Facility ID: 5175
- Class: C
- Power: 1,000 watts
- Transmitter coordinates: 41°14′22.8″N 111°59′0.8″W

Links
- Public license information: Public file; LMS

KOGN (1490 AM) is a radio station which is currently silent, but previously broadcast a Regional Mexican format. Licensed to Ogden, Utah, United States, the station serves the Ogden area. The station is owned by Marcos Rivas and Ruth de Alba, through licensee Radio Positivia, Inc. The station was an affiliate of Dial Global's adult standard format. KOGN's signal was also simulcast on nearby KNFL 1470 kHz in Tremonton, Utah. The station was silent for quite some time beginning in 2009. In 2010, the station returned to air with a regional Mexican format. KNFL is no longer simulcasting KOGN, and had its license cancelled by the FCC in 2012.

== History ==
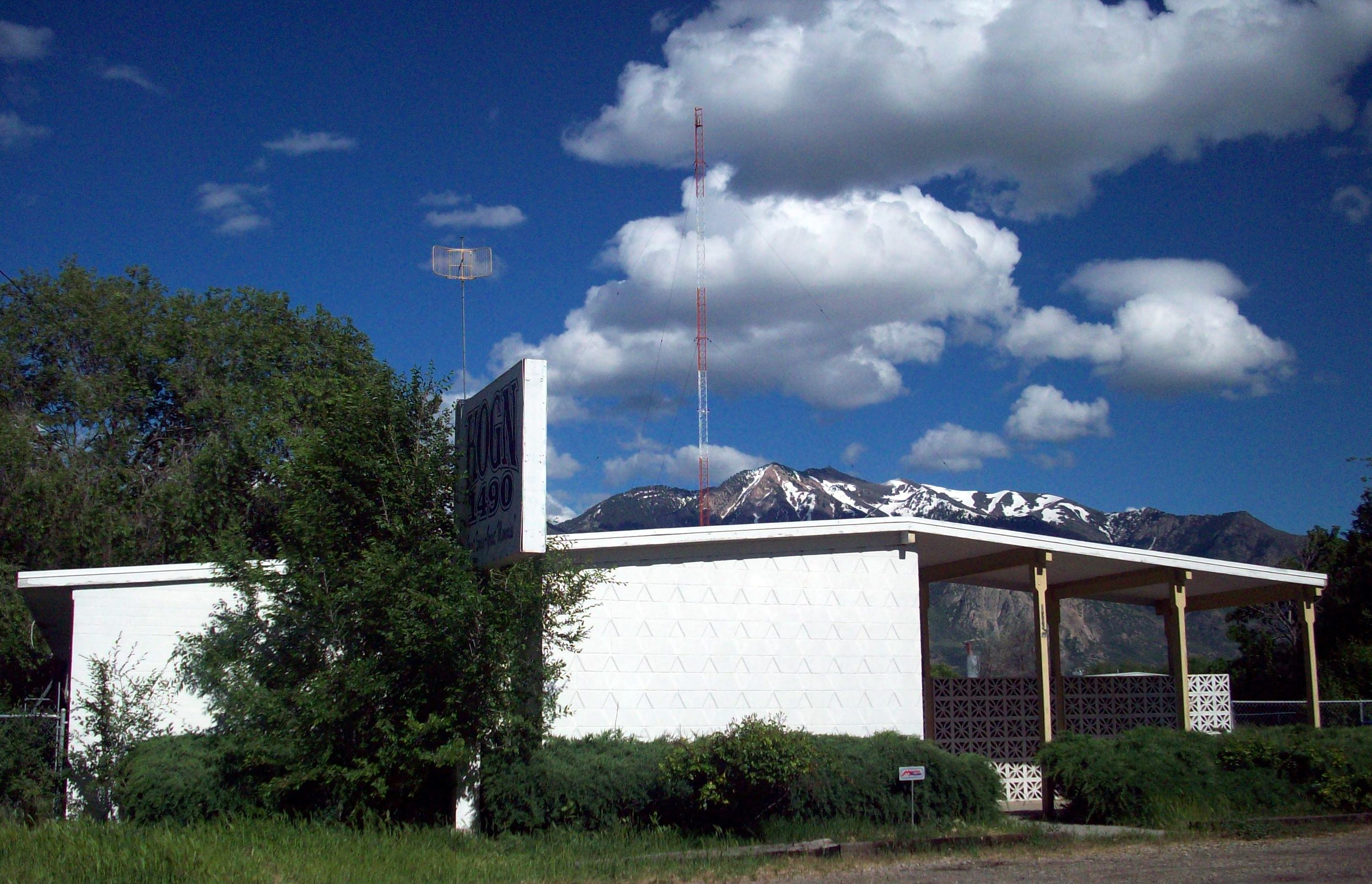
The studio and radio tower for the station, in Ogden, Utah.

The station was built by pioneer Utah broadcaster Arch Webb in April 1948 with call sign KVOG – the "Voice of Ogden" and subsequently changed to KJQN on December 1, 1978, and again on June 28, 1993, to KJOE. The radio station and its FM counterpart was acquired by the Bible Broadcasting Network from U.S. Bankruptcy Court in Salt Lake City, Utah, in 1994. The station went to non-commercial status and the call sign changed on May 16, 1994, to KYFO. KYFO aired primarily religious programming. The station was then sold to AM Radio 1490, Inc. in 2005, and changed to the call sign KOGN on May 1, 2006.

On May 29, 2009, The Fifth District Court of Utah in Washington County appointed a receiver to take over KOGN. This was done for US Capital, Incorporated of Boulder, Colorado, an investment group which foreclosed on Legecy Media, the owners of KOGN and several other stations. The receiver sold the station to Familia Broadcasting, LLC of Salt Lake City in a court-approved sale, at a price of $25,000; the purchase was consummated on May 31, 2013. On September 10, 2021, Positivia Radio, Inc. agreed to purchase KOGN from Familia Broadcasting LLC. On December 20, 2021, KOGN ceased broadcasting. The transmitter site in Ogden has been sold, and the station's current status is unknown. Former KVOG and KJQN DJ Bill Allred reports that the KOGN studio building has recently been demolished.

On August 15, 2022, Familia Broadcasting LLC consummated the sale of KOGN to Positivia Radio, Inc.
