= KSOS (Utah) =

Radio station in Brigham City, Utah (1948–2004)

- Brigham City, Utah; United States
- Frequency: 800 kHz

Ownership
- Owner: Simmons Media Group; (Simmons–SLC, LS, LLC)

History
- First air date: February 15, 1948
- Last air date: November 2004
- Former call signs: KBUH (1948–1984); KFRZ (1984–1986); KNKK (1986–1988); KZAN (1988–1991)

Technical information
- Facility ID: 21615
- Power: 1,000 watts (day); 30 watts (night)
- Transmitter coordinates: 41°18′54″N 112°4′44.4″W

KSOS was a radio station broadcasting on 800 kHz from Brigham City, Utah. First licensed in 1948, it was deleted in 2004.

== History ==
The station was issued its first license in 1948, as KBUH. During the 1980s, it was owned by Brent Larson, who had the transmitter and tower moved from 948 W. Forest Street in Brigham City, where the station had operated its sign-on, to Plain City in 1985. It carried oldies programming for much of its life, switching to classic rock in 1995. The call letters were changed to KFRZ in 1984, KZAN in 1988, and KSOS in 1991.

=== Expanded Band assignment ===
On March 17, 1997, the Federal Communications Commission (FCC) announced that eighty-eight stations had been given permission to move to newly available Expanded Band transmitting frequencies, ranging from 1610 to 1700, with KSOS authorized to move from 800 to 1660. A Construction Permit for the expanded band station was assigned the call letters KBDF on March 23, 1998.

=== Later history ===
KSOS was famous for its weekly Hispanic-oriented "El Ranch Rio Grande show" hosted by a local and veteran broadcaster George Gonzales. When the station was pulled off air, the show was canceled.

In 2002, the station was sold to Simmons Media Group and began simulcasting KZNS 1280, which was also being simulcasted on 960 in Utah County, on KOVO. Before Bonneville International began operating KUTR on 820 AM in 2005, Simmons Media Group, who had sold KUTR to Bonneville, pulled the station off the air completely in November 2004.

An FCC policy allowed both original stations and their expanded band counterparts to operate simultaneously for up to five years, after which owners would have to turn in one of the two licenses, depending on whether they preferred the new assignment or elected to remain on the original frequency. Therefore, KSOS's license was cancelled on September 2, 2004. Its expanded band counterpart, KXOL 1660 AM, was later also deleted, on August 17, 2015.
