= KCEU =

Utah Public Radio station in Price, Utah

Simulcasts KUSU-FM, Logan
- Price, Utah; United States
- Broadcast area: Carbon County
- Frequency: 89.7 MHz
- Branding: The Edge

Programming
- Format: Alternative/College Radio

Ownership
- Owner: Utah State University Eastern; (Utah State University of Agriculture and Applied Science)

History
- Call sign meaning: College of Eastern Utah

Technical information
- Licensing authority: FCC
- Facility ID: 172526
- Class: A
- ERP: 440 watts
- HAAT: -50 meters
- Transmitter coordinates: 39°36′41″N 110°48′36″W

Links
- Public license information: Public file; LMS

KCEU (89.7 FM) is a radio station in Price, Utah. It currently forms part of the Utah Public Radio network of Utah State University.The station had previously operated as the campus station at the College of Eastern Utah, which became Utah State University Eastern.

== History ==
KCEU went on the air in 2010 as The Edge, "Eastern Utah's Only Alternative". The station ran an alternative format, prominently featuring the "Alternative Weekly Top 40". KCEU was a curriculum based station within the Department of Journalism and Communication at USU Eastern; staff were broadcast communication students from within the department. In late 2014, the station became a repeater for Utah Public Radio, based at the USU campus in Logan.
