= KCYN =

- Moab, Utah; United States
- Frequency: 97.1 MHz

Programming
- Format: Country music
- Affiliations: Compass Media Networks; Premiere Networks; Westwood One

Ownership
- Owner: William Craig Knott; (AZED 5 Communications, LLC)
- Sister stations: KCPX

History
- First air date: September 20, 1998
- Call sign meaning: "Canyon"

Technical information
- Licensing authority: FCC
- Facility ID: 72729
- Class: C1
- ERP: 29,000 watts
- HAAT: 394 meters (1,293 ft)
- Transmitter coordinates: 38°31′37″N 109°18′21″W

Links
- Public license information: Public file; LMS
- Website: kcynfm.com

KCYN (97.1 FM) is a radio station broadcasting a country music format. Licensed to Moab, Utah, United States, the station is currently owned by Will Knott, through licensee AZED 5 Communications, LLC, and features programming from Compass Media Networks, Premiere Networks, and Westwood One.

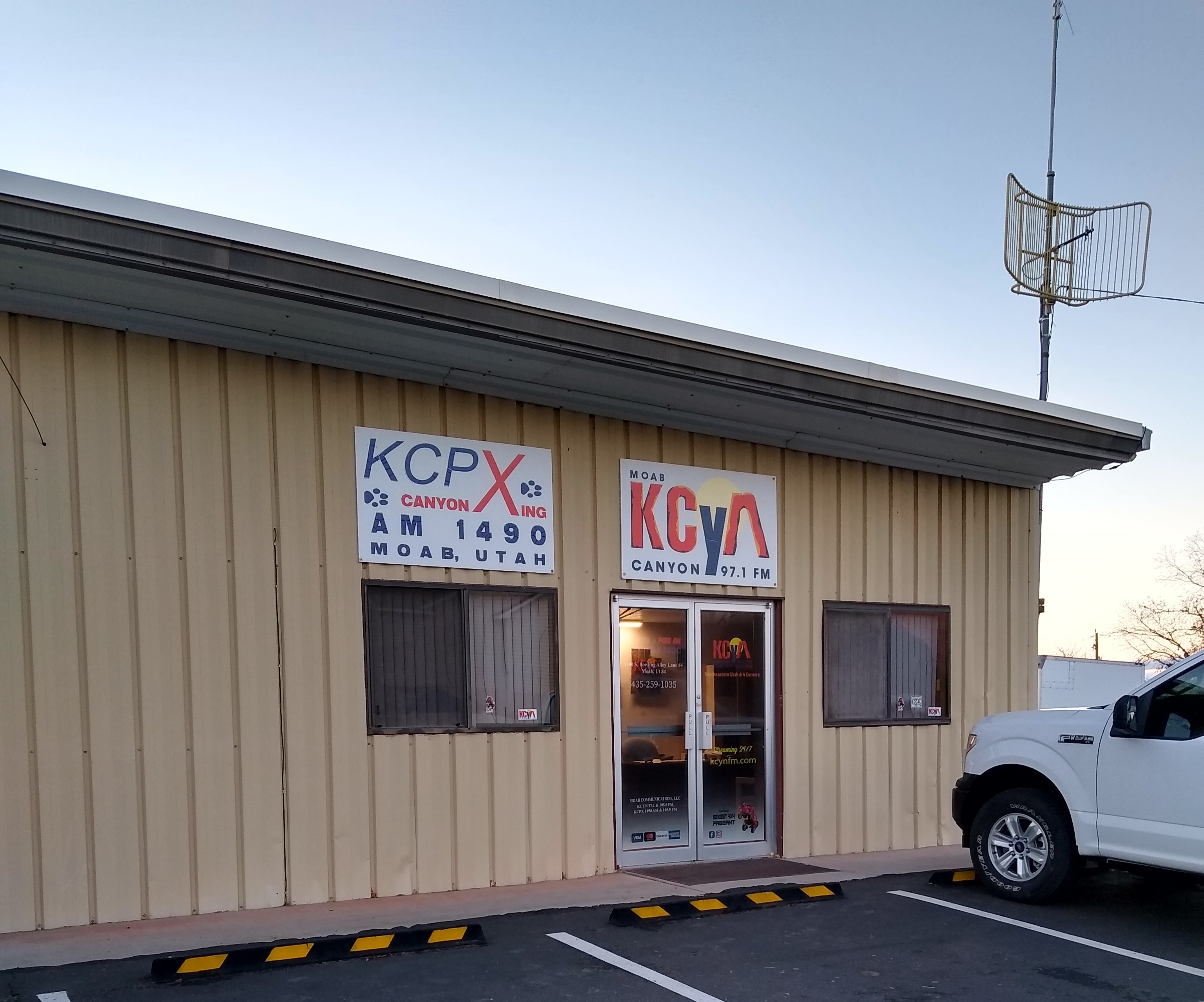
Headquarters of KCYN in Moab

Former logo

The station's community engagement includes sponsorship and participation in local events like the Recovery Day gathering and the audio broadcast for the Fourth of July fireworks. KCYN is listed as a recognized entity by the Moab Chamber of Commerce.

KCYN first signed on the air on September 20, 1998. The station is a Class C1 FM facility, broadcasting at 29,000 watts ERP from a transmitter positioned for coverage across southeastern Utah's red rock canyons.
