= KUSU-FM =

Public radio station at Utah State University in Logan, Utah

- Logan, Utah; United States
- Frequency: 91.5 MHz (HD Radio)
- Branding: Utah Public Radio

Programming
- Format: Public radio
- Subchannels: HD2: Classical "UPR Classical"
- Affiliations: National Public Radio; Public Radio Exchange; American Public Media

Ownership
- Owner: Utah State University; (Utah State University of Agriculture and Applied Science)

History
- First air date: 1953
- Former call signs: KVSC (1953–1961)
- Call sign meaning: Utah State University

Technical information
- Licensing authority: FCC
- Facility ID: 69597
- Class: C
- ERP: 90,000 watts
- HAAT: 347 meters (1,138 ft)
- Transmitter coordinates: 41°53′11″N 112°4′17″W
- Translator: (29 total as of 2011)

Links
- Public license information: Public file; LMS
- Webcast: FM/HD1; UPR Classical (HD2)
- Website: upr.org

KUSU-FM (91.5 FM), known as Utah Public Radio (UPR), is an NPR-member radio station. It airs NPR programs, plus classical and folk music. Licensed to Utah State University in Logan, Utah, it broadcasts as Utah Public Radio on a series of 30 translators throughout the state. It is a part of the College of Humanities and Social Sciences at Utah State University.

Utah Public Radio is a member of National Public Radio (NPR) and an affiliate of Public Radio Exchange (PRX) and of American Public Media (APM). They hold membership in Western States Public Radio, The Rocky Mountain Corporation for Public Broadcasting, the Utah Broadcasters Association, the Radio Resources Consortium, The Development Exchange, the National Translator Association, and the Public Radio Association of Development Officers (PRADO). UPR receives programming from several independent program producers, including The Beethoven Satellite Network, provider of around-the-clock classical music.

While Utah Public Radio covers nearly all of Utah, its signal is spotty at best in Salt Lake City due to the presence of two low-powered FM stations adjacent to KUSU's dial location (although Logan is part of the Salt Lake City radio market). Under adequate atmospheric conditions, and with sensitive receivers, it is possible to receive KUSU in Salt Lake City. The station once operated a translator in Salt Lake City at 96.7 FM but it was deactivated in 2005.

== Repeaters ==
Utah Public Radio also has five high-power repeaters:

- KUSR 89.5 FM, Logan
- KUSK 88.5 FM, Vernal
- KUSL 89.3 FM, Richfield
- KUST 88.7 FM, Moab
- KCEU 89.7 FM, Price

In addition to the full-power stations, KUSU is relayed by 29 translators to widen its broadcast area.

Call sign	Frequency	City of license	FID	FCC info
K239AY	95.7 FM	Montpelier, Idaho	146568	LMS
K213BB	90.5 FM	Soda Springs, Idaho	69600	LMS
K221FA	92.1 FM	Brigham City, Utah	83193	LMS
K247AG	97.3 FM	Cedar City, Utah	85690	LMS
K208AJ	89.5 FM	Delta, Utah	69579	LMS
K215BY	90.9 FM	Emery County, Utah	81414	LMS
K296DO	107.1 FM	Fruita, Utah	14180	LMS
K220FC	91.9 FM	Hanksville, Utah	69603	LMS
K207AH	89.3 FM	Laketown, Utah	69593	LMS
K220GE	89.9 FM	Levan, Utah	69588	LMS
K214AJ	90.7 FM	Milford, Utah	69580	LMS
K218AJ	91.5 FM	Monroe, Utah	69591	LMS
K208CS	89.5 FM	Ogden, Utah	69595	LMS
K204CO	88.7 FM	Panguitch, Utah	81415	LMS
K208CA	89.5 FM	Parowan, Utah	69585	LMS
K218CB	91.5 FM	Price, Utah	81416	LMS
K204BO	88.7 FM	Provo, Utah	69601	LMS
K216AD	91.1 FM	Randolph, Utah	69599	LMS
K214EH	90.7 FM	Rockville, Utah	69584	LMS
K261CL	100.1 FM	Roosevelt, Utah	85724	LMS
K215CF	90.9 FM	St. George, Utah	82400	LMS
K292DA	106.3 FM	Tabiona, Utah	69578	LMS
K233AF	94.5 FM	Teasdale, Utah	69604	LMS
K218CT	91.5 FM	Vernal, Utah	89883	LMS
K209AJ	89.7 FM	Vernal, Utah	69577	LMS
