= KUTC =

- Gunnison, Utah; United States
- Broadcast area: Manti, Utah
- Frequency: 95.7 MHz (HD Radio)
- Branding: The Boss

Programming
- Format: Classic rock
- Subchannels: HD2: KMGR (Soft AC)
- Affiliations: ABC News Radio; Compass Media Networks

Ownership
- Owner: Mid-Utah Radio; (Sanpete County Broadcasting Company)
- Sister stations: KKUT, KLGL, KMGR, KMTI, KMXD, KSVC, KWUT

History
- First air date: March 23, 1989 (as KIPP)
- Former call signs: KIPP (1989); KLGG (1989–1993); KFMD (1993–1998); KZEZ (1998–2001); KMGR (2001–2017)
- Former frequencies: 95.7 MHz (1990–2004); 95.9 MHz (2004–2017)
- Call sign meaning: K UTah Central

Technical information
- Licensing authority: FCC
- Facility ID: 65377
- Class: C1
- ERP: 3,000 watts
- HAAT: 716 meters (2,349 ft)
- Transmitter coordinates: 39°19′18″N 111°46′11″W

Links
- Public license information: Public file; LMS
- Webcast: Listen Live
- Website: midutahradio.com

KUTC (95.7 FM) is an American radio station broadcasting a Classic rock format. It is licensed to Gunnison, Utah, and serves central Utah. The station is owned by Sanpete County Broadcasting Company.

== History ==
The station was assigned the call letters KIPP on March 23, 1989. On July 18, 1989, the station changed its call sign to KLGG and on August 11, 1993 to KFMD, on June 6, 1998, the station became KZEZ, on May 29, 2001, it became KMGR, and on April 19, 2017 became KUTC.
