= KRPX =

- Wellington, Utah; United States
- Frequency: 95.3 MHz

Programming
- Format: Hot adult contemporary
- Affiliations: Fox News Radio; Premiere Networks

Ownership
- Owner: College Creek Media, LLC
- Sister stations: KOAL; KARB

History
- First air date: June 2006

Technical information
- Licensing authority: FCC
- Facility ID: 164148
- Class: A
- ERP: 6,000 watts
- HAAT: −42 meters (−138 ft)
- Transmitter coordinates: 39°36′32.9″N 110°48′52.6″W
- Translators: 95.9 K240DQ (Orangeville); 100.3 K262BO (Moab); 102.7 K274BU (Green River)

Links
- Public license information: Public file; LMS
- Webcast: Listen live
- Website: www.castlecountryradio.com

KRPX (95.3 FM) is a hot adult contemporary formatted radio station. Licensed to Wellington, Utah, United States, the station is owned by College Creek Media, LLC and features programming from Fox News Radio and Premiere Networks.

The transmitter for KRPX is on Horn Mountain, southwest of Price. The station signed on in 2006.
