= KEMR (Utah) =

DKEMR
Castle Dale, Utah; United States
- Frequency: 102.1 MHz

Programming
- Format: Defunct (formerly Regional Mexican)

Ownership
- Owner: College Creek Media, LLC

Technical information
- Licensing authority: FCC
- Facility ID: 164145
- Class: A
- ERP: 35 watts
- HAAT: 529 meters (1,736 ft)
- Transmitter coordinates: 39°12′28″N 111°8′32″W

Links
- Public license information: Public file; LMS

KEMR (102.1 FM) was a radio station licensed to Castle Dale, Utah, United States. The station was owned by College Creek Media, LLC.

On September 30, 2013, the Federal Communications Commission (FCC) notified the licensee that the station's license had expired effective July 6, 2012, due to the station having been silent for the preceding twelve months. The FCC simultaneously deleted the KEMR call sign from their data base.
