= KNFL (Utah) =

Radio station in Tremonton, Utah, United States (2006–2012)

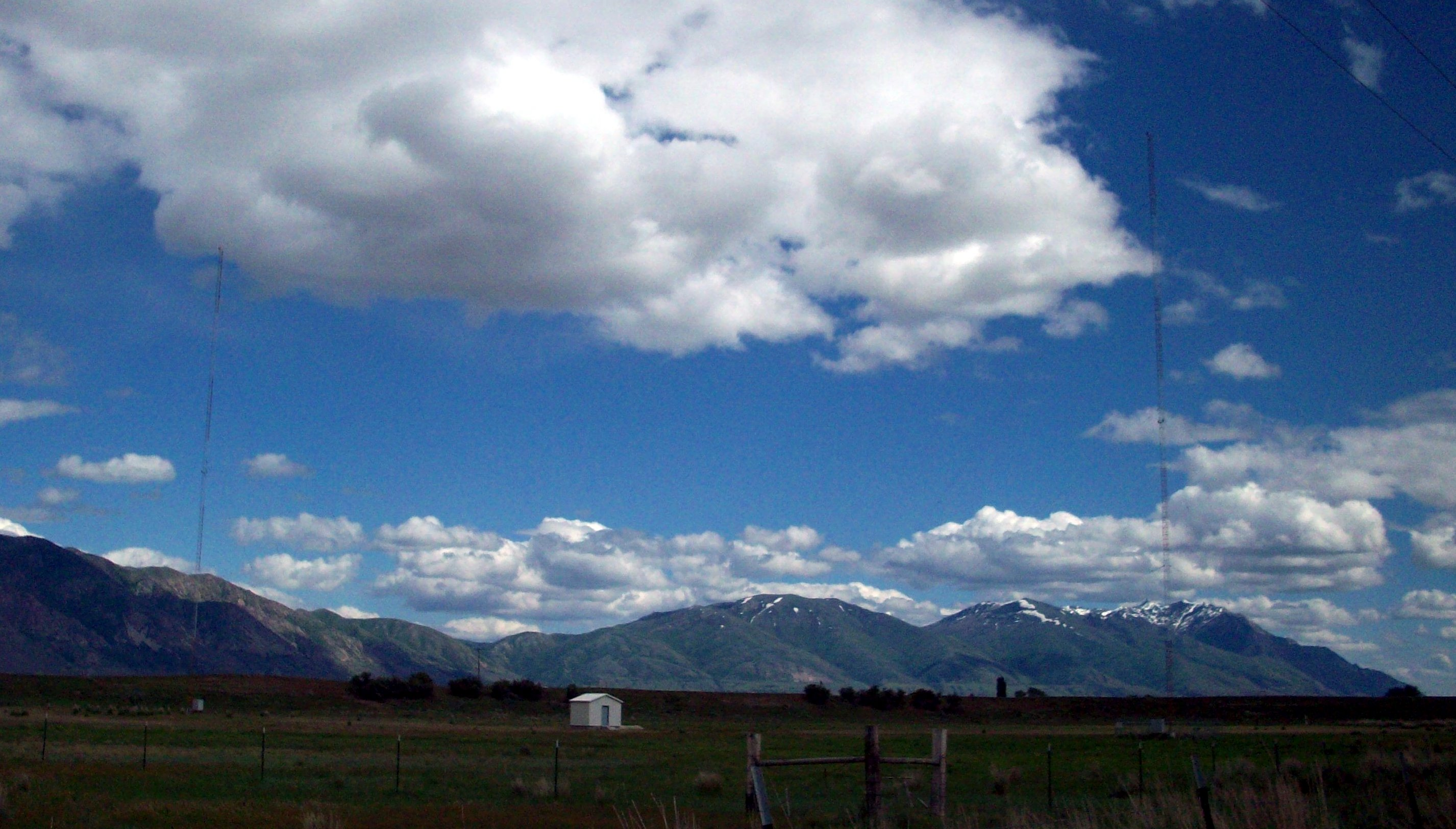
- The KNFL towers, near Brigham City, Utah, in 2008, since demolished
- Tremonton, Utah; United States
- Broadcast area: Northern Utah
- Frequency: 1470 kHz

Ownership
- Owner: AM Radio 1470, Inc.
- Sister stations: KOGN

History
- First air date: January 27, 2006
- Last air date: c. November 19, 2012
- Former call signs: KACE (2001–2006, CP)

Technical information
- Facility ID: 129784
- Class: B
- Power: 1,000 watts (day); 880 watts (night)
- Transmitter coordinates: 41°35′33″N 112°06′07″W

KNFL (1470 AM) was an adult standards formatted radio station licensed to Tremonton, Utah, United States. The station was originally simulcast with sister station KOGN however then began running its own network.

== History ==
The station was constructed by AM Radio 1470, Inc. a subsidiary of Legacy Communications Corporation and was authorized to commence construction on November 15, 2001, with the temporary call sign KACE. The KACE calls were used while the station was under construction. According to the FCC records of the station, the station became KNFL on September 9, 2004. The station signed on January 27, 2006, simulcasting its sister station in Ogden, Utah: KOGN. The station went silent on April 1, 2006, and remained off the air for several months.

On May 29, 2009, The Fifth District Court of Utah in Washington County, Utah appointed a receiver to take over KNFL for US Capital, Incorporated of Boulder, Colorado, an investment group which foreclosed on Legecy Media, the owners of KNFL and several other stations. The receiver turned the license in to the FCC on November 13, 2012, and requested it be cancelled pursuant to court approval. The FCC cancelled the license on November 19, 2012.
