= KXOL (Utah) =

Radio station in Brigham City, Utah (1998–2015)

- Brigham City, Utah; United States
- Broadcast area: Ogden, Utah
- Frequency: 1660 kHz
- Branding: La Raza

Programming
- Format: Defunct (formerly Regional Mexican)
- Affiliations: La Raza Media

Ownership
- Owner: Inca Communications
- Sister stations: KEGH 107.1 FM, KMRI 1550 AM

History
- First air date: August 1998; 28 years ago
- Former call signs: KBDF (March–April 1998: CP)

Technical information
- Licensing authority: FCC
- Facility ID: 87107
- Class: B
- Power: 10,000 watts (day); 1,000 watts (night)
- Transmitter coordinates: 41°18′54″N 112°04′43″W

Links
- Public license information: Public file; LMS

KXOL (1660 AM, "La Raza") was a commercial radio station licensed to serve Brigham City, Utah, United States. The station was owned by Inca Communications.

KXOL broadcast a Regional Mexican music format to the greater Ogden, Utah, area. The station had previously aired a 1950s-1960s-based oldies music format from its original sign-on until it was acquired by Inca Communications in 2007.

KXOL's signal had been reported in Northern and Southern California, in Flagstaff, Arizona, and as far away as Washington and Oregon.

== History ==
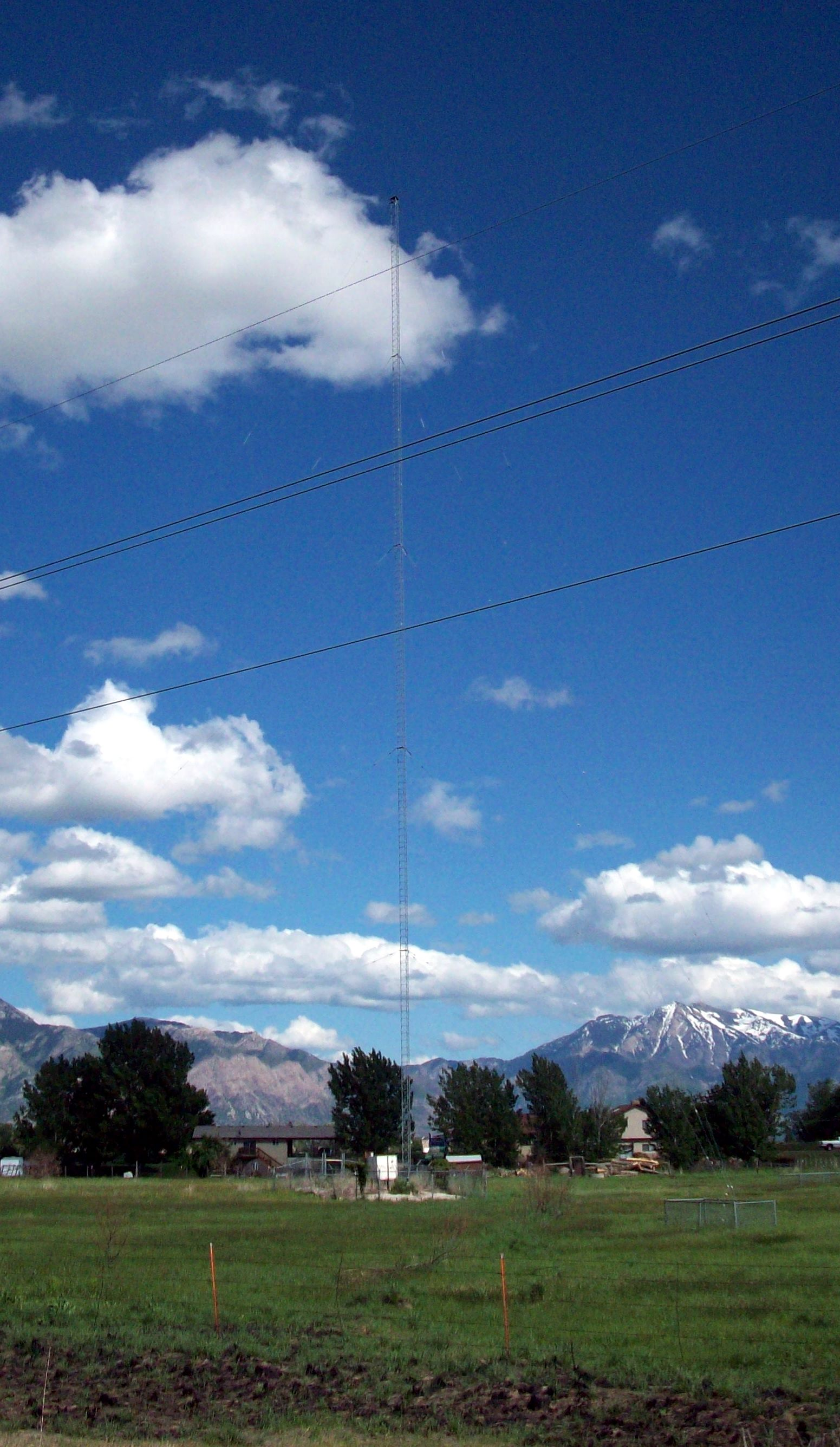
The radio tower for KXOL located near Plain City, Utah.

KXOL originated as the expanded band "twin" of an existing station on the standard AM band. On March 17, 1997, the Federal Communications Commission (FCC) announced that eighty-eight stations had been given permission to move to newly available "Expanded Band" transmitting frequencies, ranging from 1610 to 1700 kHz, with KSOS in Brigham City authorized to move from 800 to 1660 kHz.

An FCC policy allowed both original stations and their expanded band counterparts to operate simultaneously for up to five years, after which owners would have to turn in one of the two licenses, depending on whether they preferred the new assignment or elected to remain on the original frequency. Therefore, KSOS's license on 800 AM was cancelled on September 2, 2004.

The expanded band station was issued a construction permit from the FCC on February 6, 1998. Its original call sign, KBDF, assigned on March 23, 1998, was short-lived, and the station was assigned KXOL less than one month later, on April 17, 1998. KXOL received its license to cover from the FCC on April 27, 2001.

In December 2002, First National Broadcasting Corporation reached an agreement to sell this station to Simmons Media Group holding company Simmons-SLC, LS, LLC, as part of a two-station deal for a reported sale price of $925,000. Simmons Media Group had been operating the stations since August 2002 under a local marketing agreement. The deal was approved by the FCC on March 18, 2003, and the transaction was consummated on April 1, 2003. At the time of the sale, the station played an oldies music format.

In October 2006, Simmons Media Group, through its Simmons-SLC, LS, LLC, holding company, made a deal to sell KXOL to Inca Communications, Inc. (Nicolas Vicente, president) for reported sale price of $1 million. The deal was approved by the FCC on November 30, 2006, and the transaction was consummated on April 30, 2007. At the time of the sale, the station played an oldies music format. Inca Communications operated KXOL under a local marketing agreement for a reported $5,000 per month until the sale was completed.

On August 17, 2015, KXOL's license was deleted by the FCC, due to the station having been silent for more than twelve months (since November 26, 2013). Although the license was deleted, and the call letters removed from the FCC database, KXOL continued to broadcast well into 2016, with many listeners across the mountain west hearing it on a nightly basis.
