= Ballard, Utah =

- City
- Location in Uintah County and the state of Utah
- Coordinates: 40°17′42″N 109°57′30″W
- Country: United States
- State: Utah
- County: Uintah
- Settled: c. 1905
- Named for: Melvin J. Ballard

Area
  - Total: 13.98 sq mi (36.21 km^{2})
  - Land: 13.98 sq mi (36.21 km^{2})
  - Water: 0 sq mi (0.00 km^{2})
- Elevation: 5,049 ft (1,539 m)

Population (2020)
  - Total: 1,130
  - Density: 78.2/sq mi (30.19/km^{2})
- Time zone: UTC-7 (MST)
  - Summer (DST): UTC-6 (MDT)
- ZIP code: 84066
- Area code: 435
- FIPS code: 49-03345
- GNIS feature ID: 2411662
- Website: www.ballardcityut.gov

Ballard (/ˈbælərd/ BAL-ərd) is a city in Uintah County, Utah, United States. The population was 801 at the 2010 census, an increase from the 2000 population of 566.

== Geography ==
According to the United States Census Bureau, the town has a total area of 14.0 square miles (36.3 km^{2}), all land.

== Demographics ==
Historical population
Census	Pop.	Note	%±
1980	558		—
1990	644		15.4%
2000	566		−12.1%
2010	801		41.5%
2020	1,130		41.1%
U.S. Decennial Census

At the 2000 census there were 566 people, 181 households, and 146 families in the town. The population density was 40.4 people per square mile (15.6/km^{2}). There were 196 housing units at an average density of 14.0 per square mile (5.4/km^{2}). The racial makeup of the town was 95.41% White, 0.18% African American, 3.00% Native American, 0.53% from other races, and 0.88% from two or more races. Hispanic or Latino of any race were 1.41%. Of the 181 households, 47.0% had children under 18, 70.7% were married couples, 3.9% had a female householder with no husband present, and 19.3% were non-families. 18.2% of households were one person, and 7.7% were one person aged 65 or older. The average household size was 3.13, and the average family size was 3.58.

The age distribution was 34.6% under the age of 18, 10.2% from 18 to 24, 26.5% from 25 to 44, 20.3% from 45 to 64, and 8.3% 65 or older. The median age was 30 years. For every 100 females, there were 108.9 males.

The median household income was $35,278, and the median family income was $36,484. Males had a median income of $29,875 versus $17,361 for females. The per capita income for the town was $12,620. About 7.7% of families and 8.5% of the population were below the poverty line, including 6.8% of those under age 18 and 17.0% of those aged 65 or over.

== Twin towns ==
- Tennant Creek, Northern Territory, Australia
