= KBJA =

- Sandy, Utah; United States
- Broadcast area: Salt Lake City metropolitan area
- Frequency: 1640 kHz
- Branding: K-Talk

Programming
- Format: Talk / Brokered programming

Ownership
- Owner: United Broadcasting Company, Inc
- Sister stations: KTKK

History
- First air date: 1997

Technical information
- Licensing authority: FCC
- Facility ID: 87119
- Class: B
- Power: 10,000 watts day 1,000 watts night
- Transmitter coordinates: 40°42′47″N 111°55′53″W

Links
- Public license information: Public file; LMS
- Webcast: Listen Live
- Website: KTalkMedia.com

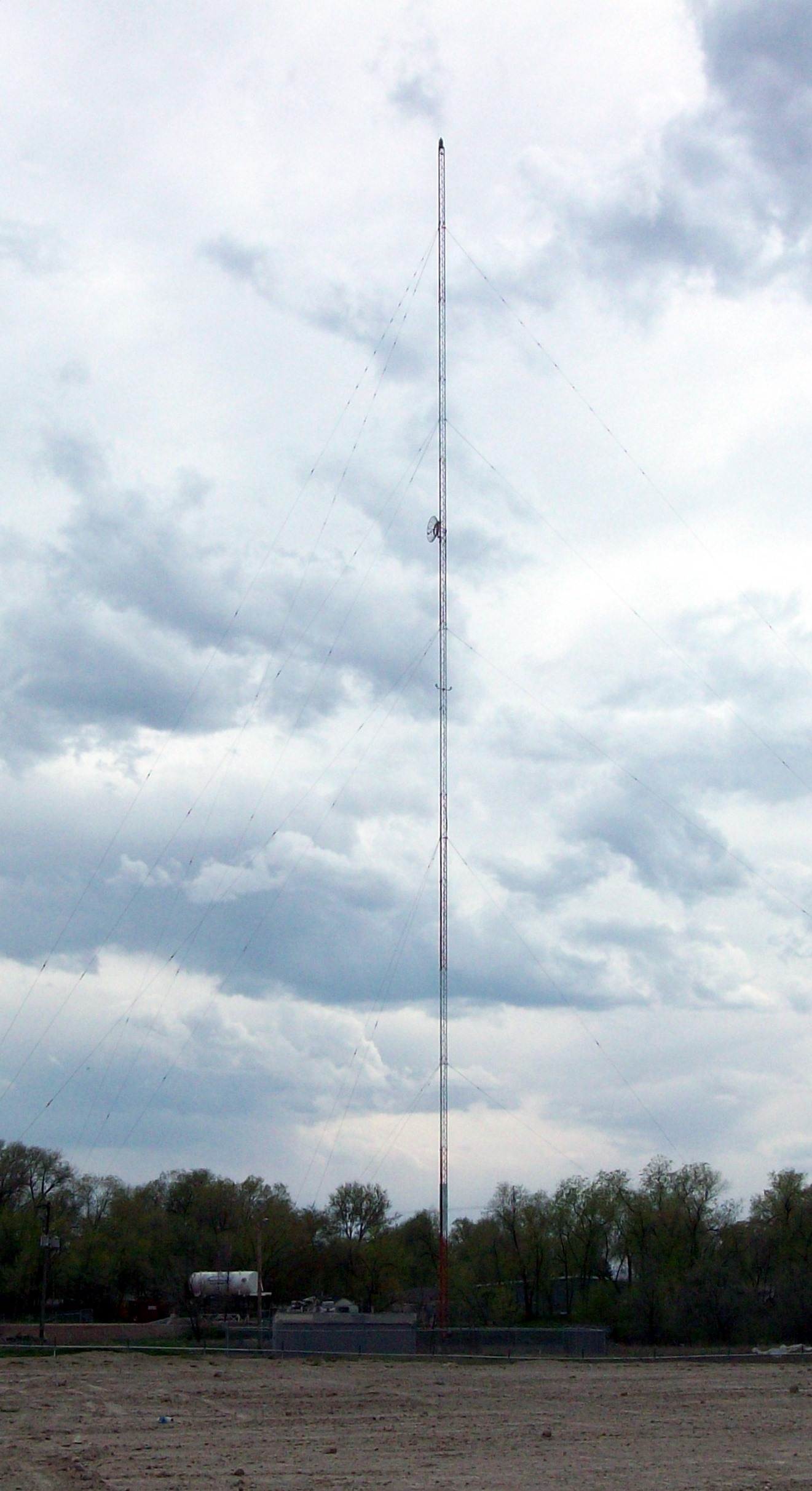
The radio tower for KBJA, shared with KKAT (AM)

Previous logo with the Spanish format

KBJA (1640 kHz) is a commercial AM radio station licensed to Sandy, Utah, and serving the Salt Lake City metropolitan area. The station is owned by United Broadcasting Company. KBJA broadcasts a talk radio format. Much of its schedule is paid brokered programming where the host buys time on the station and can sell advertising to support the show. KBJA's programming had once been heard on AM 630 KTKK "K-Talk" until that co-owned station ceased broadcasting and its programming was shifted over to AM 1640.

KBJA's studios and offices are on South Redwood Road in South Jordan. The transmitter is off West 2590 South, near West Derby Street, in West Valley City.

== History ==
KDZR began as the "expanded band" twin to station KTKK, which broadcast on the standard AM band. On March 17, 1997 the Federal Communications Commission (FCC) announced that eighty-eight stations had been given permission to move to newly available "Expanded Band" transmitting frequencies, ranging from 1610 to 1700 kHz, with KTKK, also in Sandy, authorized to move from 630 kHz to 1640 kHz.

The FCC's initial policy was that both the original station and its expanded band counterpart could operate simultaneously for up to five years, after which owners would have to turn in one of the two licenses, depending on whether they preferred the new assignment or elected to remain on the original frequency, although this deadline was extended multiple times.

KBJA first signed on in 2001. It was owned by the United Broadcasting Company, which also owned 630 KTKK. At first, KBJA aired Spanish-language talk programming. Later it added some sports programming from the ESPN Deportes Radio Network.

In April 2017, management decided to shut off AM 630 KTKK and sell off the property where its towers stood. KBJA 1640 dropped its Spanish talk and sports format and began simulcasting the English-language talk format from 630 KTKK. On May 1, 2017, with AM 630 now permanently dark, all programming was heard on 1640 KBJA. United Broadcasting then turned in the license for KTKK 630 to the FCC for cancellation.
