= KFUR-LP =

Radio station in St. George, Utah

- St. George, Utah; United States
- Frequency: 101.1 MHz
- Branding: Estéreo Única

Programming
- Format: Spanish variety

Ownership
- Owner: Latinos Unidos Broadcasting

History
- First air date: March 31, 2003
- Former call signs: KOEZ-LP (2001–2013)
- Former frequencies: 105.1 MHz (2001–2012)

Technical information
- Licensing authority: FCC
- Facility ID: 123829
- Class: L1
- ERP: 20 watts
- HAAT: 125.1 meters (410 ft)
- Transmitter coordinates: 37°3′48″N 113°34′23″W

Links
- Public license information: LMS
- Website: www.estereounica.com

KFUR-LP (101.1 FM) is a low-power FM radio station broadcasting a regional Mexican music format. Licensed to St. George, Utah, United States, the station is currently owned by Latinos Unidos Broadcasting.

== See also ==
- KDYL (AM), an associated station in Salt Lake City
