= KARB =

- Price, Utah; United States
- Frequency: 98.3 MHz

Programming
- Format: Country music

Ownership
- Owner: Eastern Utah Broadcasting Company
- Sister stations: KRPX, KOAL

History
- First air date: July 4, 1977

Technical information
- Licensing authority: FCC
- Facility ID: 18390
- Class: C3
- ERP: 7,000 watts
- HAAT: -32 meters
- Transmitter coordinates: 39°36′33″N 110°48′50″W
- Translators: K232AR (94.3 MHz, Moab)

Links
- Public license information: Public file; LMS

KARB (98.3 FM) is a radio station broadcasting a country music format. Licensed to Price, Utah, United States, the station is owned by Eastern Utah Broadcasting Company.

== History ==
KARB was among the first radio stations in the Castle Valley area, signing on July 4, 1977. Originally, the station aired country, however the country format would go to sister station KOAL, while KARB aired a contemporary hits format. This format lasted until 1992, when KOAL became news talk and country returned to KARB.
