= KSVC =

- Richfield, Utah; United States
- Frequency: 980 kHz
- Branding: KSVC AM 980 FM 100.5

Programming
- Format: Talk

Ownership
- Owner: Douglas Barton; (Sanpete County Broadcasting Company)
- Sister stations: KMTI, KMXD, KUTC

History
- First air date: 1947

Technical information
- Licensing authority: FCC
- Facility ID: 41897
- Class: B
- Power: 10,000 watts day 1,000 watts night
- Transmitter coordinates: 38°47′16.9″N 112°0′44.7″W (day); 38°45′39.9″N 112°4′37.7″W (night)
- Translators: K253BX (98.5 MHz, Marysvale); K266CN (101.1 MHz, Marysvale)

Links
- Public license information: Public file; LMS
- Webcast: Listen Live
- Website: midutahradio.com

KSVC (980 AM) is a radio station broadcasting a talk format. Licensed to Richfield, Utah, United States, the station is currently owned by Douglas Barton, through licensee Sanpete County Broadcasting Company. KSVC is an affiliate of BYU sports.

KSVC's low dial position allows it to be heard over a wide area in central Utah, and beyond.

== History ==
KSVC is one of the oldest operating radio stations in Central Utah. The station first began broadcasting in September 1947. The station was established by William L. Warner, Sr., with the assistance of his son, William, Jr. Its early branding was "The Voice of Scenic Utah".

The station covers central Utah high school sports, including basketball, football, and baseball for teams like Richfield, South Sevier, and Delta.

It is an affiliate of CBS News Radio. It carries local farm reports as well.
