= KKLV =

Radio station in Kaysville–Salt Lake City, Utah

- Kaysville, Utah; United States
- Broadcast area: Salt Lake City and Provo, Utah
- Frequency: 107.5 MHz (HD Radio)
- Branding: K-Love

Programming
- Format: Contemporary Christian
- Subchannels: HD2: Air1; HD3: K-Love Eras

Ownership
- Owner: Educational Media Foundation
- Sister stations: KNKL

History
- First air date: 1978 (as KABE at 107.1)
- Former call signs: KORM (1978); KABE (1978–1983); KUUT (1983–1984); KMGR (1984–1992); KMXB (1992–1996); KENZ (1996–2005); KKAT-FM (2005–2011)
- Former frequencies: 107.1 MHz (1978–1983)
- Call sign meaning: Kaysville K-Love

Technical information
- Licensing authority: FCC
- Facility ID: 69553
- Class: C
- ERP: 22,000 watts
- HAAT: 1,243 metres (4,078 ft)
- Transmitter coordinates: 40°39′35″N 112°12′5″W (Farnsworth Peak)
- Translator: HD2: 89.7 K209CJ (Tooele)

Links
- Public license information: Public file; LMS
- Webcast: Listen Live; Listen Live (HD2)
- Website: klove.com air1.com (HD2)

KKLV (107.5 FM, "K-Love") is an American Contemporary Christian music formatted radio station broadcasting to the Salt Lake City metropolitan area. The station is licensed to serve the community of Kaysville, Utah, and is owned by the Educational Media Foundation. It was previously owned and operated by Wasatch Radio, LLC as trustee which Citadel Broadcasting divested, four months after picking up KHTB in the Salt Lake City cluster. While previously transmitting from Lake Mountain, the station now transmits from Farnsworth Peak, west of Salt Lake City.

== History ==
=== Early years (1978–1996) ===
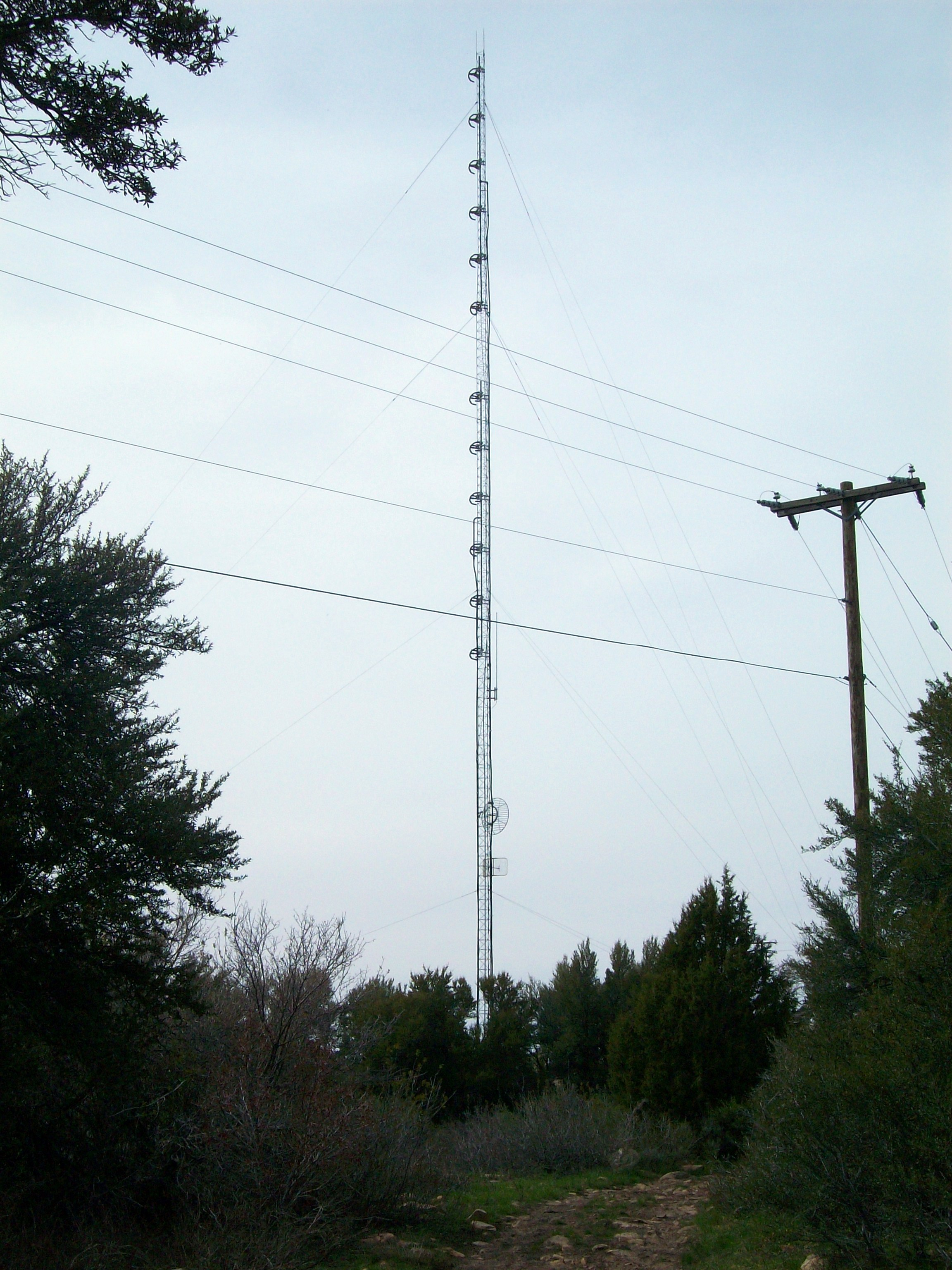
The station's former radio tower, located atop Lake Mountain.

Former "Country Legends" logo.

KKLV signed on in 1978 as KABE on 107.1 in Orem, Utah. It ran what would be known as an adult hits format until 1983 when the station was moved to 107.5 and ran a stylized pop format as KUUT from 1983 until 1984. From 1984 to 1992, the station was known as KMGR, when in 1992, the call letters changed to KMXB before becoming KENZ in 1996.

=== Adult alternative (1996–2005) ===
KENZ first started as "107.5 The End" at midnight on January 1, 1996 with R.E.M.'s "It's the End of the World as We Know It (And I Feel Fine)", and aired an adult album alternative format. Originally owned by The Slaymaker Group (Monarch Broadcasting), the station was sold to Citadel Broadcasting in 1998.

Much of the original staff came from now cross town rival KXRK. Jimmy Chunga, a weekender and producer of The Radio from Hell Show at X96 was hired to lead the morning show. Chunga first did the show solo, then was teamed up for a short time with a female co-host. He was joined by Marcus soon afterward. Andrea was hired away from X96 to work the midday shift. Biff Raff returned to the Salt Lake City market after spending time in Austin, TX and Denver, CO to be the program director. He also did an afternoon on-air shift. Dom Casual was the station's first music director and afternoon drive jock. Barb Thomas worked the night shift. Mister West left X96 as well and brought the "Saturday Night Cold Case" to the station. Pete May left 96.5 The Peak in Denver to join the staff as Production Director, and performed as “Announcerboy” on the morning show, playfully insulting Chunga, Marcus, and Mr. West. Norm Church also left X96 to work on-air, as well as take over marketing responsibilities for the station.

In 1999, "Chunga and Marcus" hosted a contest titled "The Cruise of Dreams," after which Marcus did not return to the show. Shortly after the departure of Marcus, Mister West joined the morning show as Chunga's partner. This was a role reversal of sorts as Chunga had been West's partner on the "Saturday Night Cold Case," a call-in request show during West's weekend shift dating back to their days at X96.

At the end of 2005, Citadel Broadcasting moved the station from the 107.5 MHz frequency to the stronger and farther-reaching 101.9 MHz frequency. Even though they were no longer at the end of the dial, they retained the name.

=== Classic country (2005–2010) ===
When KENZ moved to 101.9, the station became known as KKAT. KKAT was perhaps best known as "Country Legends 107.5" with the morning show hosted by Country Joe. It played mostly classic country hits. The station was in operation from 2005–2010, before being sold to EMF. The station's former sister stations included KUBL, KENZ, KHTB, KBER, KBEE, KJQS, KFNZ and KKAT.

=== Christian (2010–present) ===
In late March 2010, KKAT flipped to the contemporary Christian rebroadcast of K-LOVE. The KKAT website advised listeners to tune to the station's sister signal KUBL. The website also thanked listeners and stated the station was under new ownership. In March 2011, the station changed call letters to KKLV, reflecting the new format the station has held since 2010. KKLV and its sister station KNKL effectively cover the entire Wasatch Front with the same programming.

The station now has a booster with 1,000 watts broadcasting from Lewis Peak, north of Park City, Utah.
