= KDYL =

KDYL may refer to:

- ICAO code for Doylestown Airport
- KDYL (AM) (1060 AM) licensed to South Salt Lake City, Utah, United States
- KNIT (AM) (1320 kHz) licensed to Salt Lake City, Utah, United States, which held the KDYL call sign from 1922 to 1959
- KIHU (1010 AM) licensed to Tooele, Utah, which held the KDYL call sign from 1960 to 1982
- KZNS (AM) (1280 AM) licensed to Salt Lake City which held the KDYL call sign from 1982 to 2001
- KBEE (98.7 FM) licensed to Salt Lake City, Utah, which held the KDYL-FM call sign from 1947 to 1959
- KTVX (channel 4) licensed to Salt Lake City, Utah, United States, which held the KDYL-TV call sign from 1948 to 1953
