= KENZ =

KENZ may refer to:

- KENZ (FM), a radio station (94.9 FM) licensed to serve Provo, Utah, United States
- KHTB, a radio station (101.9 FM) licensed to serve Ogden, Utah, which held the call sign KENZ from 2005 to 2015
- Kenz-Küstrow, a German village
