= KSOP =

KSOP may refer to:

- KSOP-FM, a radio station (104.3 FM) licensed to Salt Lake City, Utah, United States
- KSOP (AM), a radio station (1370 AM) licensed to South Salt Lake, Utah, United States
- Kharkiv School of Photography (KSOP)
- Moore County Airport (North Carolina) (ICAO code KSOP)
