= KKAT =

KKAT may refer to:

- KKAT (AM), a radio station (860 AM) licensed to Salt Lake City, Utah, United States
- KKLV, a radio station (107.5 FM) licensed to Orem, Utah, which held the call sign KKAT-FM from 2005 to 2011
- Kkat, the pseudonymous author of the My Little Pony fan fiction Fallout: Equestria
