= KZNS =

KZNS may refer to:

- KZNS (AM), a radio station (1280 AM) licensed to serve Salt Lake City, Utah, United States
- KZNS-FM, a radio station (97.5 FM) licensed to serve Coalvile, Utah
- KNIV, a radio station (104.7 FM) licensed to serve Lyman, Wyoming, United States, which held the call sign KZNS-FM for a short period in 2011
