= Lake Mountain =

Lake Mountain may refer to

- Lake Mountains, a mountain range in northwest Utah County, Utah, United States, overlooking Utah Lake.
- Lake Mountain (Victoria), a mountain and cross-country ski resort in Victoria, Australia.
