= KPQP =

KPQP may refer to:

- KPQP (FM), a radio station (106.1 FM) licensed to serve Panhandle, Texas, United States, see List of radio stations in Texas
- KHTB, a radio station (101.9 FM) licensed to serve Ogden, Utah, United States, which used the call sign KPQP from 2004 to 2005
- KLSD, a radio station (1360 AM) licensed to serve San Diego, California, United States, which used the call sign KPQP from 1983 to 1986
