= KUPX-TV =

Television station in Provo, Utah

- Provo–Salt Lake City, Utah; United States
- City: Provo, Utah
- Channels: Digital: 29 (UHF); Virtual: 16
- Branding: The Spot Utah 16

Programming
- Affiliations: 16.1: Independent; for others, see § Subchannels

Ownership
- Owner: E. W. Scripps Company; (Ion Media License Company, LLC)
- Sister stations: KSTU

History
- Founded: April 24, 1985
- First air date: April 21, 1998
- Former call signs: KZAR-TV (1985–1998); KUWB (1998)
- Former channel numbers: Analog: 16 (UHF, 1998–2009)
- Former affiliations: inTV (1998); Pax/i/Ion (1998–2023, now on 16.4)
- Call sign meaning: Utah's Pax TV (former affiliation)

Technical information
- Licensing authority: FCC
- Facility ID: 57884
- ERP: 530 kW
- HAAT: 1,171 m (3,842 ft)
- Transmitter coordinates: 40°39′12″N 112°12′9″W
- Translator(s): see § Translators

Links
- Public license information: Public file; LMS
- Website: www.thespottv.com/utah-16

KUPX-TV (channel 16), branded as The Spot Utah 16, is an independent television station licensed to Provo, Utah, United States, serving Salt Lake City and the state of Utah. It is owned by the E. W. Scripps Company alongside Fox affiliate KSTU (channel 13). The two stations share studios on West Amelia Earhart Drive in the northwestern section of Salt Lake City; KUPX-TV's transmitter is located on Farnsworth Peak in the Oquirrh Mountains, southwest of Salt Lake City.

Though a construction permit was issued for channel 16 in 1985, the station was not completed for another 13 years. In that time, it was sold twice. While channel 16 was originally intended to be an affiliate of The WB, a 1998 swap with Paxson Communications Corporation saw Paxson trade channel 30 for channel 16; as a result, KUWB instead launched on channel 30 in April 1998, while channel 16 signed on to air infomercials and later the Pax/Ion network. Scripps acquired Ion Media in 2020; it moved Ion Television to a subchannel in 2023 and converted the main channel to an independent station which aired Vegas Golden Knights and Arizona Coyotes hockey games in Utah. Since the 2024–25 season, it has been the broadcast home of the Utah Mammoth.

== History ==
=== Construction phase ===
In 1984, three companies applied to the Federal Communications Commission (FCC) for a construction permit to build channel 16 in Provo: Morro Rock Resources, San Joseph Broadcasting, and Skagit Valley Publishing Company. The parties avoided an FCC comparative hearing and instead settled: Skagit Valley was reimbursed for its expenses and withdrew, while San Joseph Broadcasting owner Jackson Dell Weaver and Morro Rock joined to form permittee Royal Television of Utah, with the latter owning 90 percent. Ross Boyd, the president of Morro Rock, expressed a belief that Utah needed an additional independent station.

Royal Television had considerable difficulty in constructing the station, as evidenced by several applications to change transmitter location and several construction permit extensions, and even replacements of expired construction permits. Dell Weaver departed the venture in 1987 to become general manager of radio station KJR in Seattle. In 1988, the station's call sign was deleted, only to be restored four months later. In July 1990, Royal Television applied to replace the construction permit that was to expire the following month. The application was not granted until February 1996, more than five years later. In October 1995, Roberts Broadcasting agreed to buy the station from Royal Television for $200,000.

In August 1997, ACME Communications agreed to acquire a 49 percent stake in KZAR-TV, with an agreement to purchase the other 51 percent once the television station was on the air; the deal closed in February 1998. Jamie Kellner, CEO and co-founder of ACME, was also co-founder and then-CEO of The WB. Roberts announced its plans for KZAR-TV at that time. The station would be a WB affiliate. The existing WB affiliate in the market, KOOG-TV (channel 30), had been purchased by Paxson Communications Corporation, which intended to launch its own television network, Pax Net; when KOOG-TV changed its call letters to KUPX in advance of Pax Net's launch, the company indicated it would terminate its WB agreement as soon as legally possible. ACME's involvement in the station secured the continued existence of a WB affiliate in the Utah market.

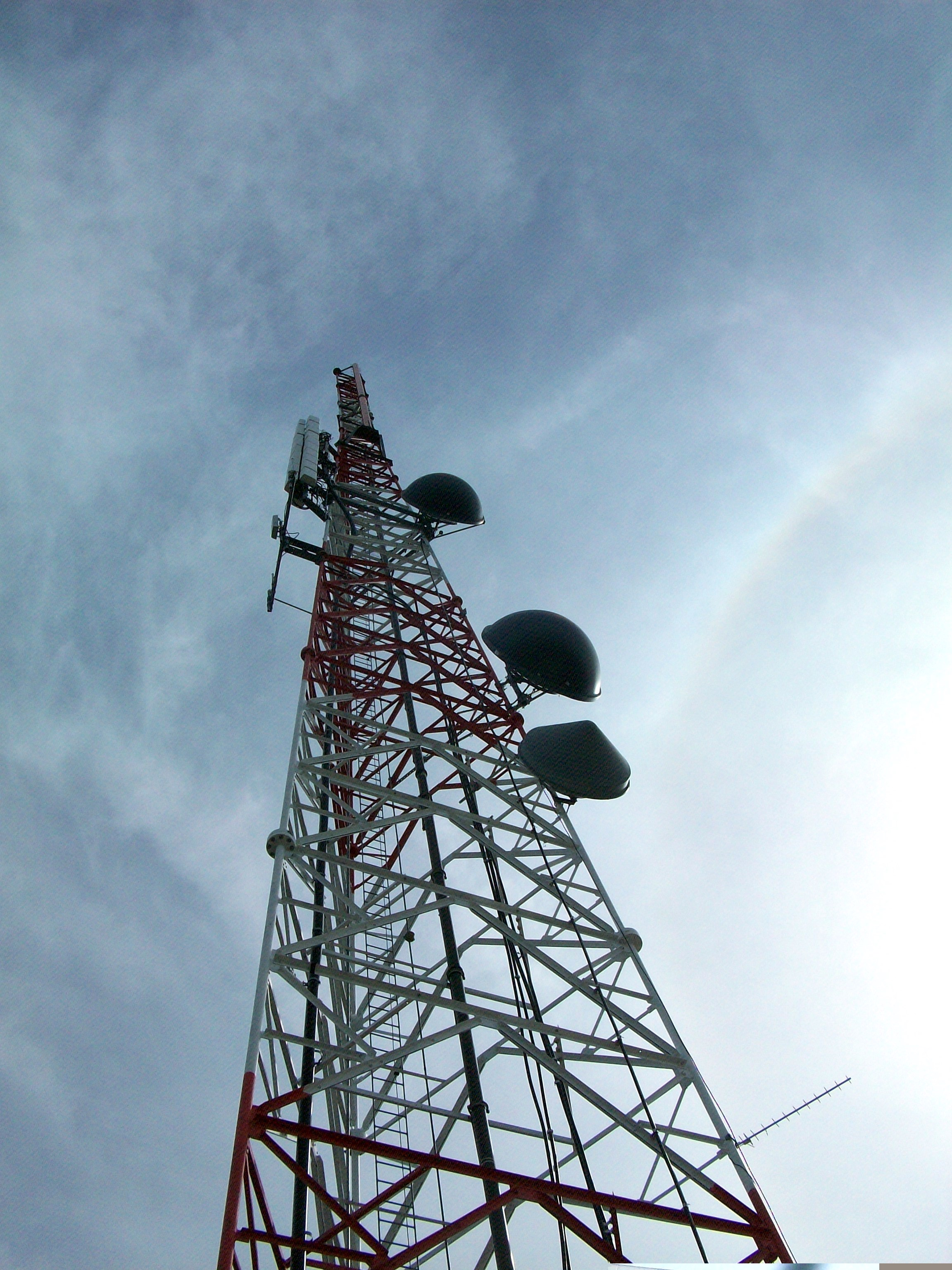
This tower on Lake Mountain broadcast the analog signal for KUPX-TV.

Roberts began seeking studio space in the Provo area and proposed to air Utah County-oriented local news programming; it intended to broadcast channel 16 from Lake Mountain, causing some concern among other communications users about potential interference from the new high-power station. In February 1998, Roberts Broadcasting announced that the station would be on air by May, that its call letters would change to a designation including the letters "WB", and that the planned newscast would debut shortly after. The station also secured the rights to air Saturday Night Live in the Salt Lake City market; the show had been unseen in Utah since 1995 when KSL-TV, the new NBC affiliate, decided not to air it.

=== Swap with Paxson Communications; Pax and Ion programming ===
On April 20, 1998, Paxson entered into an agreement with Roberts Broadcasting and ACME Communications where each group would acquire the other's assets, but WB programming would remain on channel 30. To expedite the process, the parties immediately entered into local marketing agreements, whereby the stations would swap call signs and would begin to operate each other's stations until the FCC could approve the assignments of license. On the evening of April 20, channel 30 became KUWB from the existing channel 30 facility on Farnsworth Peak, while channel 16 signed on from Lake Mountain as KUPX with Paxson's programming. Neither station would have studios in Utah County; channel 30 went on air from facilities in Murray, while Paxson also sought Salt Lake–area office space. Paxson continued to air its existing infomercial programming on channel 16 until Pax Net, renamed Pax, began broadcasting on August 31, 1998. The FCC approved the swap of the licenses in March 1999, and the deal closed in the third quarter of the year.

On May 10, 2002, KUPX began broadcasting a digital signal from the more centrally located Little Farnsworth Peak. The analog transmitter on Lake Mountain remained in service until the federally mandated transition from analog to digital television concluded for full-power stations on June 12, 2009; the digital signal remained on channel 29, using virtual channel 16.

After changing its name to i: Independent Television in 2005, the network became known as Ion Television in 2007. Ion Television and its parent company, Ion Media, were acquired by the E. W. Scripps Company in 2020. While Scripps divested some stations to comply with FCC local and national ownership regulations, Scripps chose to keep KUPX-TV, making it a sister station to Fox affiliate KSTU (channel 13). The sale was completed on January 7, 2021.

=== Utah 16 ===
Logo as Utah 16, used from 2023 to 2025.

On September 1, 2023, Ion programming moved to subchannel 16.4, and channel 16.1 began airing a full slate of its own programming under the name Utah 16. The station was the Utah-market outlet for the Vegas Golden Knights of the National Hockey League (NHL), for which Scripps owns the rights to telecast all non-national games. The station also aired select Arizona Coyotes games, to which Scripps also owned the rights, with other games for that team airing on KSTU's second subchannel.

On April 18, 2024, the NHL Board of Governors announced the establishment of a Utah-based franchise (the Utah Hockey Club, renamed Utah Mammoth after the first season) in Salt Lake City, with the hockey assets of the deactivated Coyotes. Later on the same day, KUPX-TV was announced as the new team's TV outlet for all games.

== Technical information ==
=== Subchannels ===
KUPX-TV's transmitter is located on Farnsworth Peak in the Oquirrh Mountains. The station's signal is multiplexed:

Subchannels of KUPX-TV
Subchannel	Res.	Short name	Programming
16.1	720p	Utah 16	Main KUPX-TV programming
16.2	480i	Grit	Grit
16.3	480i	Laff	Laff
16.4	480i	ION	Ion
16.5	480i	IONPlus	Ion Plus
16.6	480i	BUSTED	Busted
16.7	480i	GameSho	Game Show Central
16.8	480i	HSN	HSN
16.9	480i	QVC365	QVC 365

=== Translators ===
KUPX-TV is rebroadcast on many translators throughout Utah.

- Castle Dale: K28PR-D
- Clear Creek: K29IW-D
- Delta, etc.: K33KW-D
- Duchesne: K28PH-D
- East Carbon County: K19MF-D
- East Price: K26OI-D
- Ferron: K28KQ-D
- Fillmore, etc.: K35NX-D
- Fountain Green: K33OU-D
- Fremont: K31LA-D
- Garrison, etc.: K13AAM-D
- Green River: K23JV-D, K28PN-D
- Helper: K25PM-D
- Huntington: K28KR-D
- Juab: K18GX-D
- Kanarraville, etc.: K33KF-D
- Leamington: K12QY-D
- Manti–Ephraim: K30KJ-D
- Mount Pleasant: K18IV-D
- Nephi: K26PK-D
- Orangeville: K23OH-D
- Parowan–Enoch–Paragonah: K26OA-D
- Richfield, etc.: K23NU-D
- Roosevelt: K25PH-D
- Rural Beaver County: K21KL-D
- Salina–Redmond: K04RV-D
- Scipio: K23OD-D
- Spring Glen: K33KI-D
- Teasdale: K22MV-D
- Utahn: K15LW-D
- Cortez, CO: K16CT-D
- Malad City, ID: K26OY-D
