= Lake Mountains =

Mountain range in Utah, United States

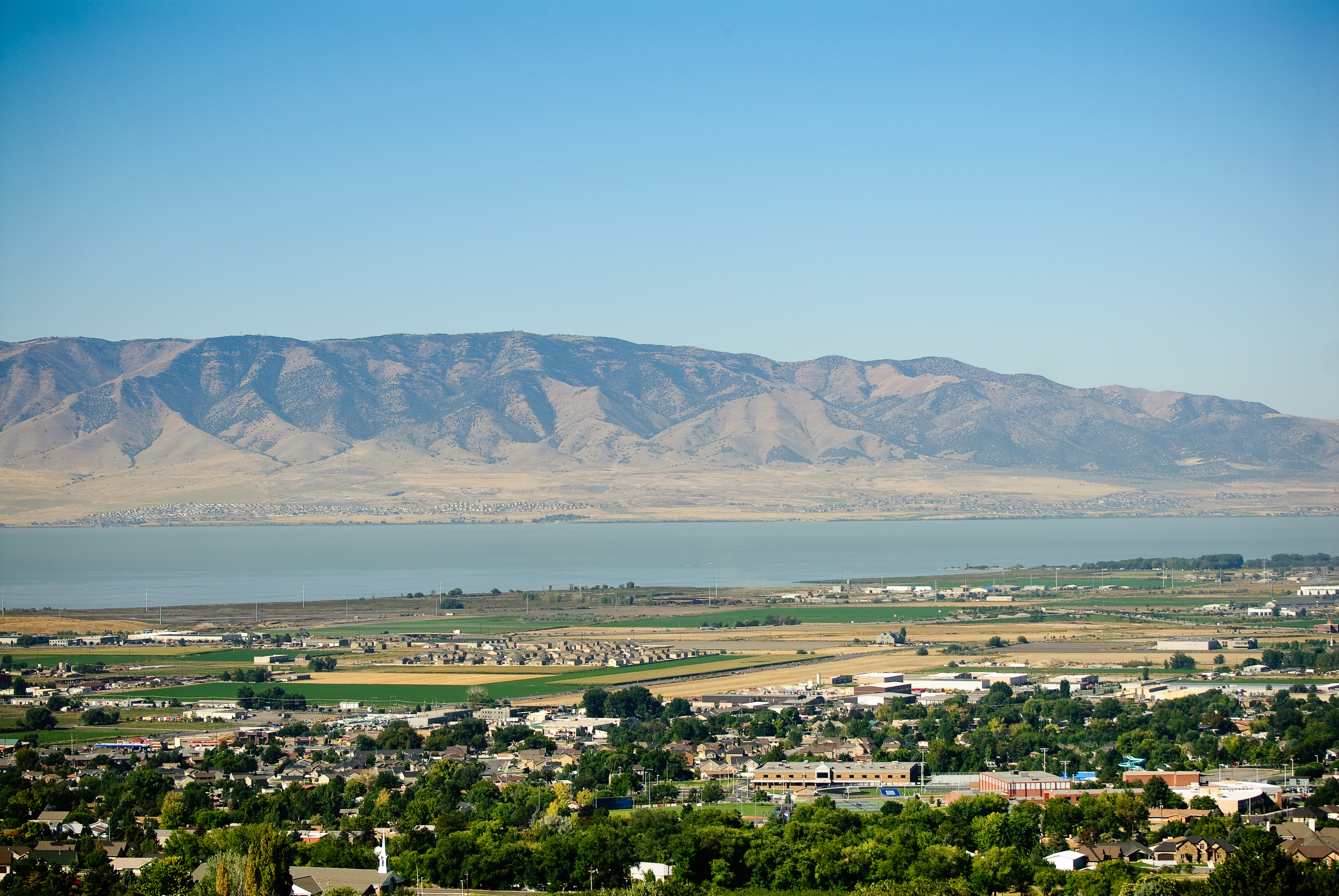
- Looking west over Pleasant Grove and Utah Lake toward the Lake Mountains, September 2009

Highest point
- Peak: Unnamed peak, at approximately the midpoint of the range
- Elevation: 7,690 ft (2,340 m)
- Listing: List of mountains in Utah; List of mountain ranges of Utah
- Coordinates: 40°16′30″N 111°54′02″W

Dimensions
- Length: 15 mi (24 km) N-S (arc-shape, curved east)
- Width: 8 mi (13 km) (at center, narrower north/south)

Geography
- Location within Utah
- Country: United States
- State: Utah
- Region: Wasatch Front
- County: Utah
- Communities: Eagle Mountain, Mosida and Saratoga Springs
- Range coordinates: 40°16′30″N 111°54′02″W
- Borders on: Oquirrh Mountains, Traverse Mountains, Utah Lake, Goshen Valley, East Tintic Mountains and Cedar Valley
- Topo map: USGS Saratoga Springs

Climbing
- Easiest route: Hike or road
- Normal route: Lake Mountain Communications Road

The Lake Mountains (also known as simply Lake Mountain) are a 15-mile-long (24 km) mountain range located on the western edge of the Utah Valley in northwestern Utah County, Utah, United States. The range forms the northwest border of Utah Lake, and its proximity to major population centers allows its use for communication towers, mostly in its north section, bordering Eagle Mountain.

== Description ==
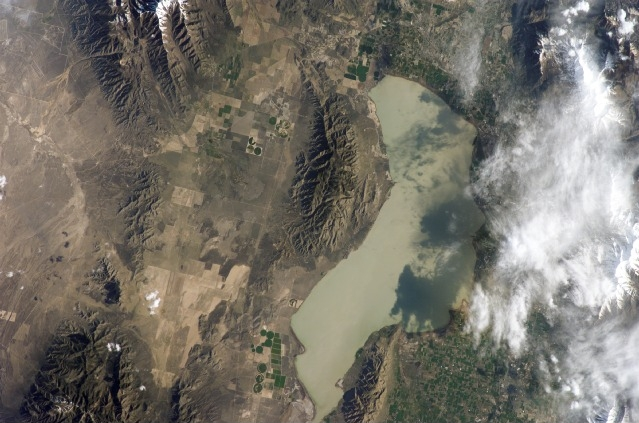
Satellite view of Utah Lake, with the arc-shaped Lake Mountains on the northwest shore.

The range is arc-shaped, curved to the east. The Lake Mountains have no prominent peaks, but a central ridge line, about 5 miles (8.0 km) long, that trends slightly north-northwest by south-southeast. The highest point in the range is an unnamed peak, with an elevation of 7,690 feet (2,340 m).

The range is bordered by Cedar Valley on the west; the Oquirrh Mountains on the northwest; the Traverse Mountains on the north, Utah Lake and Utah Valley on the northeast, east and southeast; the Goshen Valley on the south-southwest, and the East Tintic Mountains on the southwest. Utah State Route 68 (also known as Redwood Road in Saratoga Springs) runs along the northeast, east, and southeast perimeter of the mountains (along the shore of Utah Lake) and Utah State Route 73 passes by the northern edge. Lake Mountain Communications Road (a dirt road) runs roughly north-south through the range (between Saratoga Springs and Eagle Mountain) and provides access to the multiple radio communication towers on the range. Several minor dirt roads also cross the southern end of the range, with Soldiers Pass Road being the most prominent.

There are seventeen named canyons on the east side of the range, running toward Utah Lake: Long, Pfieffer, Burnt (southern), Chaparral, Miners, Potter, Enoch, Seep, Little, Olaf, Limekiln, Losee, Clark, Israel, Lott, Burnt (northern), and Reformation canyons (from south to north), with Limekiln Canyon being in the approximate center. The west side has much fewer named canyons, running toward Cedar Valley: Mercer, Ivans, Wildcat, and Wiley (from south to north), with Wiley Canyon being in the approximate center.

In late 2025, Ionic Mineral Technologies, a company headquartered in nearby Provo, Utah, announced the discovery of large deposits of rare earth minerals in the Lake Mountains range.

== Radio infrastructure ==
Radio infrastructure on the range serves several radio and television needs for the cities of Provo, Orem, American Fork, and almost all of Utah County.

=== FM and HD Radio stations ===
The Lake Mountains house radio towers for several radio stations serving the Provo area, including KENZ (94.9 FM) and two low-power translators: K256AE (99.1 FM), which simulcasts the second HD subchannel of KJMY in Salt Lake City, and K280GJ (103.9 FM), which simulcasts Salt Lake City station KUDD.

One religious radio translator also call the mountain home. K217CL (91.3 FM), carries programming from KYCC, and is licensed to Provo.

=== Amateur (ham) radio ===
Multiple repeaters for amateur radio exist on the Lake Mountains. The most well known repeaters are operated by the Utah Amateur Radio Club (UARC), first coordinated in 1927, and the Utah Valley Amateur Radio Club (UVARC), first coordinated in 2016 Numerous other stations share tower space with the repeaters above, all operating on different frequencies.

| CALLSIGN | FREQUENCY | OFFSET | TONE | SPONSOR |
|---|---|---|---|---|
| K7UCS | 145.2300 MHz | (–) 0.6 MHz | 131.8 Hz | UCARES - Utah County Amateur Radio Emergency Service |
| W7SP | 146.7600 MHz | (–) 0.6 MHz | none | UARC - Utah Amateur Radio Club |
| K7UVA | 146.7800 MHz | (–) 0.6 MHz | 100.0 Hz | UVARC - Utah Valley Amateur Radio Club |
| WX7Y | 147.0800 MHz | (+) 0.6 MHz | 77.0 Hz | SDARC - Sinbad Desert Amateur Radio Club |
| K7UCS | 147.2800 MHz | (+) 0.6 MHz | 141.3 Hz | UCARES - Utah County Amateur Radio Emergency Service |
| W7WJC | 224.4200 MHz | (–) 1.6 MHz | 156.7 Hz | UCRC - Utah County Radio Club |
| N7IMF | 224.6400 MHz | (–) 1.6 MHz | 156.7 Hz | UHDARC - Utah High Desert Amateur Radio Club |
| KE7AU | 224.7000 MHz | (–) 1.6 MHz | 107.2 Hz | |
| KA7EGC | 447.8750 MHz | (–) 5.0 MHz | 100.0 Hz | |
| K7UVA | 448.2000 MHz | (–) 5.0 MHz | 100.0 Hz | UVARC - Utah Valley Amateur Radio Club |
| K7UCS | 448.3250 MHz | (–) 5.0 MHz | 103.5 Hz | UCARES - Utah County Amateur Radio Emergency Service |
| N7IMF | 448.7000 MHz | (–) 5.0 MHz | 114.8 Hz | UHDARC - Utah High Desert Amateur Radio Club |
| WA7FFM | 449.2000 MHz | (–) 5.0 MHz | none | |
| WA7GIE | 449.4750 MHz | (–) 5.0 MHz | 100.0 Hz | |
| K7UCS | 449.6750 MHz | (–) 5.0 MHz | 173.8 Hz | UCARES- Utah County Amateur Radio Emergency Service |
| K7UCS | 449.9750 MHz | (–) 5.0 MHz | 131.8 Hz | UCARES - Utah County Amateur Radio Emergency Service |

=== Television stations ===
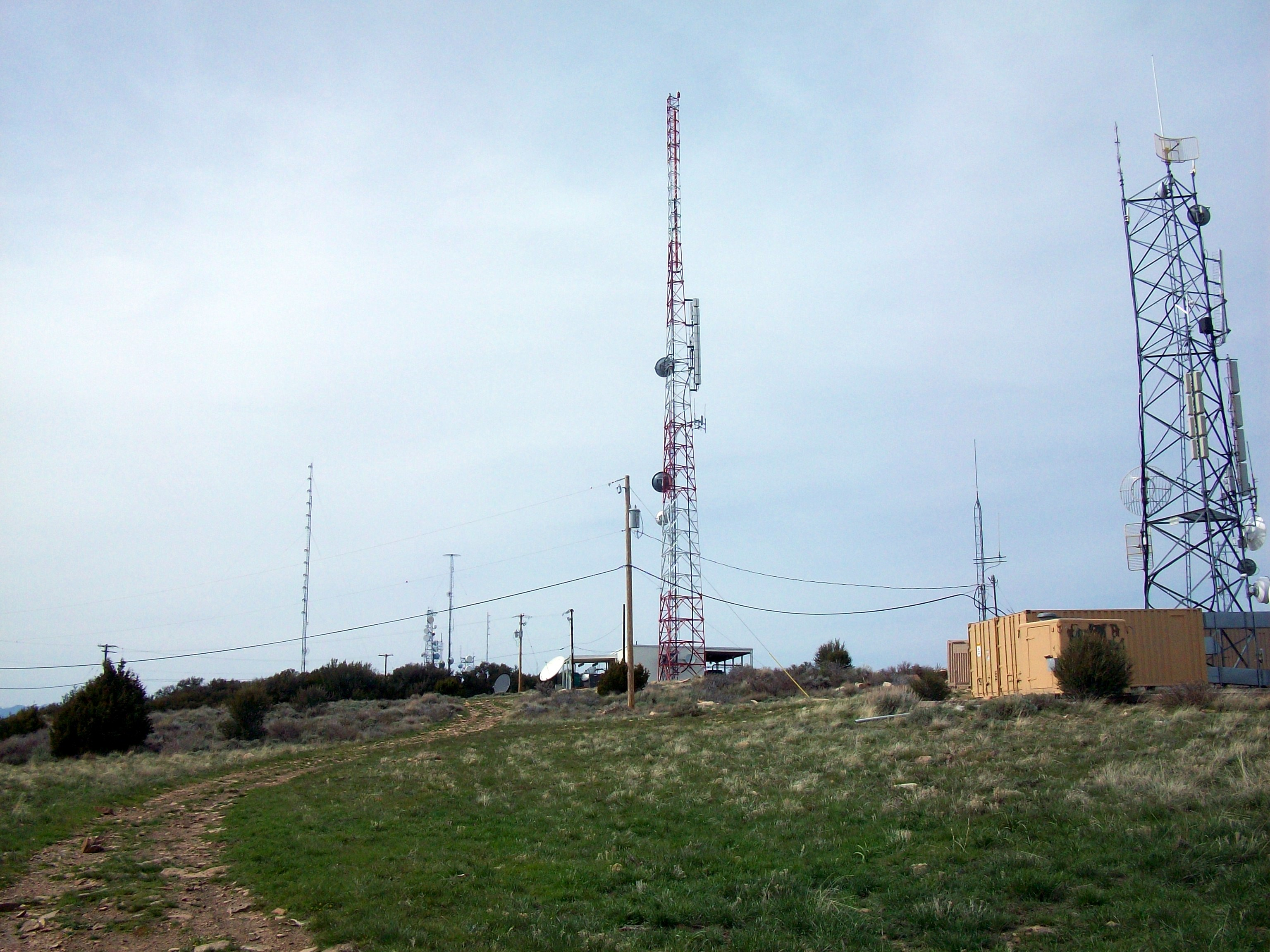
The main antenna farm atop the Lake Mountains, May 2009. The KUPX/KUTH tower is in the center.

Numerous high and low power television stations call the Lake Mountains their home. KUPX's, former analog broadcast on channel 16 from a tower on the mountains. KUPX is owned by Paxson Salt Lake City License Inc and carries programming from Ion Television. Its tower was located on the northern flank of the mountain (pictured right). KUPX now broadcasts its digital television signal on channel 29 from Farnsworth Peak. K22IT, another television station on the mountains, carried programming from KTMW in Salt Lake City. It remained in analog, and had no application to transmit in digital. Its license has since been deleted. KUTH, Salt Lake City's Univision affiliate, broadcasts its digital broadcast from the Lake Mountains on channel 32. K43JV, a lower power television translator, carries programming from 3ABN. It broadcasts on channel 43. Currently it has a construction permit to transmit in digital on RF channel 16, the former analog home of KUPX. K49GD, channel 49, was a translator for KTMW and carried a variety of programming. K49GD was licensed to Spanish Fork. The station license was deleted by the FCC. KUTH filed an application with the FCC to move its transmitter to Farnsworth Peak which would leave only K43JV transmitting from the mountain. This move will allow KUTH to better serve the Wasatch Front because of Farnsworth Peak's higher terrain and close proximity to Salt Lake City.

=== Internet service providers ===
The Lake Mountain provide an advantageous location for internet service providers to either provide wireless internet to local residents, or to relay data between facilities. Providers include Rise Broadband, InnovativeAir, SenaWave, and Avative Fiber.

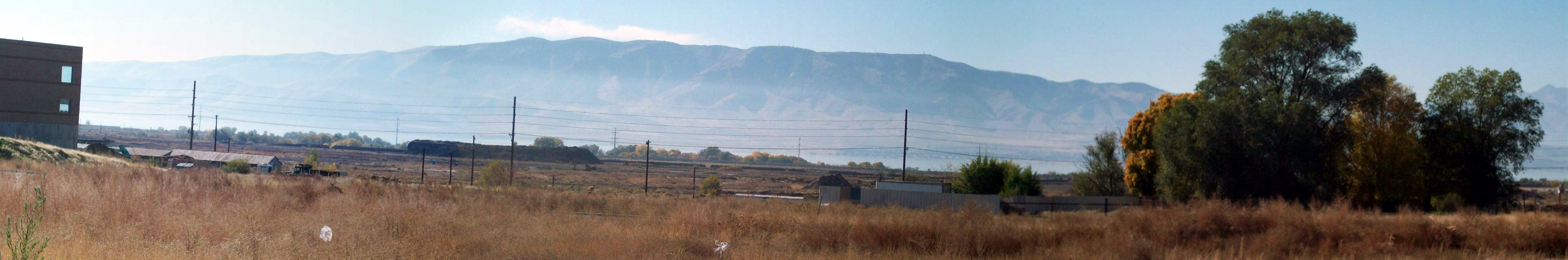
Panoramic view of the Lake Mountains from Orem, 2008

== See also ==
- List of mountain ranges of Utah
- List of mountains in Utah
