= KNIT (AM) =

Radio station in Salt Lake City

- Salt Lake City, Utah; United States
- Broadcast area: Salt Lake City metropolitan area
- Frequency: 1320 kHz
- Branding: 94.5 Utah's Hope

Programming
- Format: Christian Radio (Christian music and teaching programs)
- Network: Your Network of Praise

Ownership
- Owner: Hi-Line Radio Fellowship, Inc.

History
- First air date: May 10, 1922; 104 years ago (as KDYL)
- Former call signs: KDYL (1922–1959); KCPX (1959–1983); KBUG (1983–1987); KCPX (1987–1988); KEMX (1988–1989); KUTR (1989–1992); KCPX (2/1992–8/1992); KCNR (1992–1996); KFNZ (1996–2017)
- Former frequencies: 833 kHz (1922–1924); 1200 kHz (1924–1925); 900 kHz (1925); 1220 kHz (1925–1927); 1215 kHz (1927); 1160 kHz (1927–1928); 1290 kHz (1928–1941)

Technical information
- Licensing authority: FCC
- Facility ID: 53500
- Class: B
- Power: 730 watts
- Transmitter coordinates: 40°39′56″N 111°54′32″W
- Translator: 94.5 K233DV (Draper)

Links
- Public license information: Public file; LMS
- Webcast: Listen Live
- Website: utahshope.com

KNIT (1320 kHz) is an AM radio station in Salt Lake City, Utah. It is one of the oldest stations in Salt Lake City, established in 1922 as KDYL. The studios are on South Murray Boulevard. KNIT carries a Christian radio format supplied by Your Network of Praise, featuring Christian music and teaching programs. The non-profit organization also has stations in Montana, Idaho, Wyoming, and North Dakota. The network holds periodic fundraisers on the air to support its ministry. National religious leaders heard on KNIT include David Jeremiah, Joni Eareckson Tada, Chuck Swindoll and Jim Daly.

KNIT is a Class B station with its transmitter on Pitchfork Lane in Murray, Utah, near Interstate 215. It broadcasts with 730 watts, using a single non-directional antenna. The station shares this tower with KJJC 1230 AM. Programming is also heard on FM translator K233DV on 94.5 MHz in Draper, Utah.

== History ==
=== KDYL ===
Effective December 1, 1921, the U.S. Department of Commerce, in charge of radio at the time, adopted a regulation formally establishing a broadcasting station category, which set aside the wavelength of 360 meters (833 kHz) for entertainment broadcasts, and 485 meters (619 kHz) for farm market and weather reports.

On May 8, 1922, the Telegram Publishing Company, publishers of the Salt Lake Telegram newspaper, was issued a license for a new station on the shared 360 meter "entertainment" wavelength. This was the second broadcasting station licensed in the state of Utah, following KZN, which had been licensed 17 days earlier and had made its debut broadcast on May 6. The new station's call letters were KDYL, which was randomly assigned from an alphabetical roster of available call signs. Earlier stations had received three-letter call signs, and KDYL was the first western broadcasting station to receive the new standard of a four-letter call sign. This may have caused some confusion, as early reports in the Telegram incorrectly listed the call letters as "KDL".

The station was constructed by Ira J. Kaar for A.L. Fish and the newspaper. At its introduction, the newspaper promised "a service unrivaled in the inter-mountain region". KDYL's debut broadcast, 7:00 to 8:00 and 9:00 to 10:00 on the evening of May 10, 1922, included a mixture of live singing, including by Theo Pennington, Columbia phonograph records provided by Auerbach's phonograph department, bedtime stories and news bulletins.

During the 1920s KDYL's transmitting frequency was changed multiple times, including 1200 kHz, 900 kHz, 1220 kHz, a non-standard self-assigned 1215 kHz, back to 1220 kHz, 1160 kHz, 1280 kHz, and finally, as part of a major national reallocation under the provisions of the Federal Radio Commission's General Order 40, to 1290 kHz.

The Newhouse Hotel became the owner in 1924, and in 1926 Sidney S. Fox's Intermountain Broadcasting Corporation, located at the Ezra Thompson Building, gained ownership. During the Golden Age of Radio, KDYL aired a line up of dramas, comedies, news, sports, game shows, soap operas and big band broadcasts. In the 1930s, the station affiliated with CBS Radio Network. On September 1, 1932, KDYL became an NBC Red Network affiliate, after KSL affiliated with CBS.

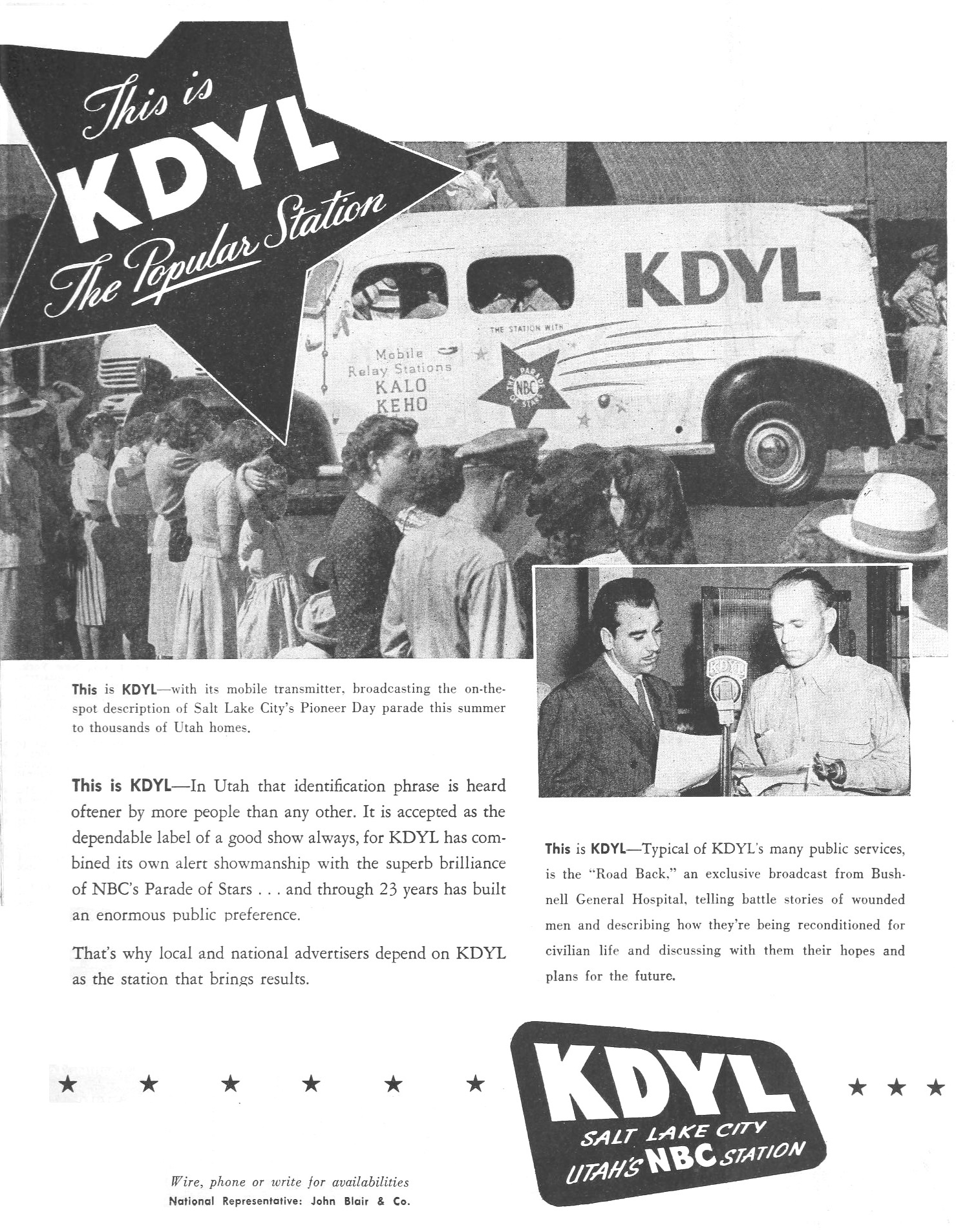
1945 promotional advertisement for KDYL.

The March 1941 implementation of the North American Regional Broadcasting Agreement (NARBA) moved the stations on 1290 kHz, including KDYL, to 1320 kHz. KDYL was now authorized for 5,000 watts daytime and 1,000 watts at night, with an outstanding construction permit for 5,000 watts nighttime directional operation.

Sydney Fox later invested in the construction of its sister stations KDYL-FM (now KBEE) in 1947 and in KDYL-TV (now KTVX) two years later. In 1953, Fox sold KDYL-AM-FM-TV to the Time-Life Corporation for $2.1 million, which changed the TV station's call letters to KTVT.

=== Top 40 KCPX ===
In late 1959 Columbia Pictures Electronics, Inc. purchased KDYL AM-FM and KTVT, and changed their call signs to KCPX AM-FM-TV. Through the 1960s and 70s, KCPX carried a Top 40 format that was very popular in the Salt Lake City area. During this time, the station competed heavily for listeners with crosstown rival KNAK (now KZNS). As Top 40 listening switched to FM, the station's ratings fell.

Columbia Pictures, which had just been acquired by The Coca-Cola Company, sold KCPX and KCPX-FM to Price Broadcasting in 1982. (The TV station had been sold to separate owners in 1975.)

=== KBUG and KEMX ===
In 1983, the station's call sign was changed to KBUG. Initially the station aired an adult contemporary format. By 1986 the format had been changed to oldies. In 1987, the station's call sign was changed back to KCPX, and the station continued airing an oldies format.

On August 1, 1988, the station's call sign was changed to KEMX, and the station began airing an "Easy Mix" format consisting of softer songs from the 1950s, 1960s, and 1970s, as well as some country crossover hits. The Easy Mix format lasted only a year.

=== KUTR and KCNR ===
On August 7, 1989, the station began airing the "LDS Contemporary" format, aimed at Mormon listeners, that had previously aired on KUTR (now KKAT). On September 14, 1989, the station's call sign was changed to KUTR.

Citing insufficient support from advertisers, KUTR dropped the LDS music format on January 31, 1992, and began simulcasting the adult contemporary format of KCPX-FM. On February 18, 1992, the station changed its call sign back to KCPX. Along with its FM sister station, KCPX used the slogan "continuous favorites, from yesterday to today."

In April 1992, Citadel Associates (a forerunner of Citadel Broadcasting), owner of KLZX (93.3 FM) and KCNR (860 AM), began programming KCPX and KCPX-FM under a local marketing agreement (LMA). Later that year, Citadel moved KCNR's all-news format from AM 860 to AM 1320. On August 11, 1992, the station's call sign switched to KCNR to represent CNN Radio, its main supplier of national news. In 1993, the station adopted a talk radio format.

=== Sports format ===
In late August 1996, the station flipped to a sports talk format. On August 30, 1996, the station's call sign was changed to KFNZ to go along with its new identification as "KFAN". Citadel Broadcasting bought KFNZ and KBEE-FM outright from Price Broadcasting in 1997. In 2007, Larry H. Miller, who owned the Utah Jazz and KJZZ-TV, began operating KFNZ. The station's owner, Citadel Broadcasting, merged with Cumulus Media on September 16, 2011. The Larry H. Miller Group bought rival KZNS-FM (97.5) and KZNS in May 2012, after the end of its local marketing agreement (LMA) with KFNZ. Most of the station's programming, including Utah Jazz broadcasts, were moved to KZNS. while KFNZ retained the "KFAN" branding with a new Cumulus-programmed schedule.

KFNZ featured programming from CBS Sports Radio. It was the flagship station for the Utah Grizzlies. KFNZ was also responsible for providing analysis and coverage for the BYU Cougars, University of Utah Utes, Salt Lake Bees, Utah State Aggies, and Weber State Wildcats.

=== Religious format ===
Cumulus elected to sell the land used for KFNZ's transmitter site, due to its increased value in the expanding Salt Lake City real estate market. On February 27, 2017, the station ceased broadcasting, and the next day Cumulus filed with the FCC to cancel its license. However, Cumulus subsequently received an offer to buy the station for $100,000 from Vic Michael of Kona Coast Radio, owner of radio stations in Hawaii, Arizona, Colorado and Wyoming. Therefore, Cumulus rescinded its license surrender request, instead filing for a Special Temporary Authorization to temporarily remain silent.

The sale was completed on August 22, 2017, and on October 18, 2017, the new owners changed the station's call letters to KNIT. Kona Coast Radio was required to relocate the transmitter site, and the station remained off the air for two years during this process. In 2019, KNIT resumed broadcasting as a Christian radio station, becoming a Your Network of Praise affiliate. KNIT was now transmitting from KJJC's tower, which required a power reduction from the original 5,000 to 730 watts.

Effective June 6, 2020, Vic Michael transferred KNIT's license from Kona Coast Radio to his also wholly owned Michael Radio Company, LLC. Effective March 18, 2021, Michael sold the station to Hi-Line Radio Fellowship, Inc. for $200,000.

== See also ==
- List of initial AM-band station grants in the United States
