= KTMW =

Television station in Salt Lake City

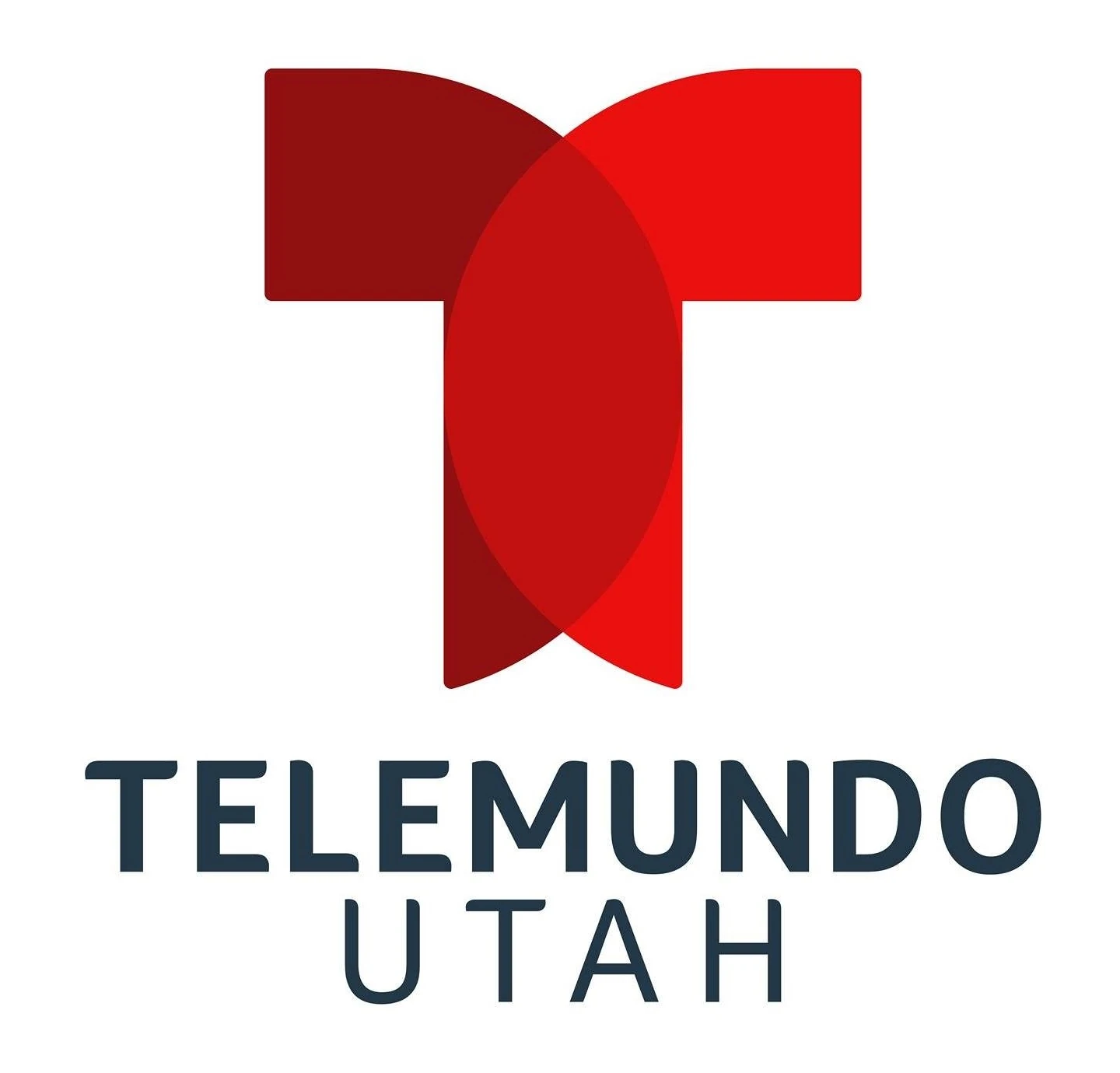
- Salt Lake City, Utah; United States
- Channels: Digital: 20 (UHF); Virtual: 20
- Branding: Telemundo Utah

Programming
- Affiliations: 20.1: Telemundo; for others, see § Subchannels

Ownership
- Owner: Telemundo Station Group; (NBC Telemundo License LLC)

History
- Founded: December 8, 1997
- First air date: March 31, 2001
- Former channel numbers: Analog: 20 (UHF, 2001–2009)
- Former affiliations: Religious Independent; FamilyNet; The Family Channel; Jewelry Television
- Call sign meaning: Originally for "The Mountain West", with the "T" backronymed to represent Telemundo

Technical information
- Licensing authority: FCC
- Facility ID: 10177
- ERP: 55.3 kW
- HAAT: 1,171 m (3,842 ft)
- Transmitter coordinates: 40°39′12″N 112°12′9″W
- Translator(s): see § Translators

Links
- Public license information: Public file; LMS
- Website: www.telemundoutah.com

KTMW (channel 20) is a television station in Salt Lake City, Utah, United States, broadcasting the Spanish-language Telemundo network to the state of Utah. Owned and operated by NBCUniversal's Telemundo Station Group, the station maintains studios are located on South Redwood Road in the northwestern section of Salt Lake City, and its transmitter is located on Farnsworth Peak in the Oquirrh Mountains, southwest of Salt Lake City.

KTMW's programming is relayed on four low-power digital translators: Class A stations KULX-CD (UHF channel 14) in Ogden and KEJT-CD (UHF channel 21) in Salt Lake City, and KULU-LD (UHF channel 16) in Park City, and K17II-D (UHF Channel 17) in Logan.

== History ==
The channel 20 allocation in Salt Lake City was originally occupied by KSTU (an independent station at the time, now a Fox affiliate) from 1978 to 1987. As part of a deal that was approved by the Federal Communications Commission (FCC), the KSTU intellectual unit moved to channel 13 in 1987 and currently operates under a separate license. The old channel 20 license was deleted; KTMW's license dates back to its filing on December 8, 1997. Alpha & Omega Broadcasting, former owners of KOOG (channel 30), was granted the license in 1998. KTMW signed on March 31, 2001, with a religious format. The station would run shows like The 700 Club, Joyce Meyer, James Robison, and others; the original meaning of the calls stood for "The Master's Way". It eventually affiliated with FamilyNet and ran its classic TV shows for about a third of the day.

On April 1, 2015, Alpha & Omega Communications filed an application to sell KTMW to Serestar Communications. It was approved by the FCC on August 13, 2015. The sale was completed on August 31, 2015.

On July 30, 2015, Airwaves, Inc. filed an application to sell KULX-CD and KULU-CD to Serestar, who immediately took over the station's operations through a time brokerage agreement (TBA). The sale was completed on October 7, 2015. Later that month, KTMW switched to Telemundo, simulcasting low-power sister station KULX-CD.

Serestar agreed to sell KTMW, KULX-CD, and KULU-CD to NBCUniversal on November 28, 2018, as part of a $21 million deal; that transaction closed on March 5, 2019. NBCUniversal already owned the KEJT-CD license, with Serestar operating it under a TBA that was terminated concurrent with the sale.

KEJT-CD was the second property in Utah to be owned by NBC as it previously owned KUTV (channel 2, now a CBS affiliate) until 1995 when it was sold to CBS alongside then-sister station KCNC-TV in Denver. KUTV is currently owned by the Sinclair Broadcast Group as of 2021.

Older station logos.

== Final original programming ==
Logo used until 2015.

When it was owned by Alpha & Omega Communications, KTMW's original programming had included:

- Heart for the Lost with Andy Bird – a program that discusses Evangelism, Apologetics and Christ.
- Heart of the Matter with Shawn McCraney – author of I Was a Born-Again Mormon and pastor of C.A.M.P.U.S (Christian Anarchists Meeting Prayerfully Understand Scripture), McCraney offers his personal insight about the differences between Mormonism and Evangelical Christianity. In January 2013, Heart of the Matter was abruptly canceled under pressure from local Evangelical pastors who feared McCraney would discuss and possibly criticize them and their methods.
- Polygamy: What Love Is This? with Doris Hanson – a live television, phone-in talk show program broadcast weekly on Thursdays at 8 p.m. Produced by "A Shield and Refuge Ministry", who offers assistance to those trying to leave a polygamous lifestyle, and is hosted by Hanson, a former member of a Utah polygamous community known as the Davis Co-Operative Society.
- The Ancient Paths with Jason Wallace – a television ministry of Christ Presbyterian Church (an Orthodox Presbyterian Church), in Magna, Utah. The host discusses his perspective on various topics and takes questions and comments from callers.
- This Week in the Word with Greg Johnson – as founder of the evangelical Standing Together ministry, Rev. Johnson is joined by two other local Pastors for weekly theological discussions. A common topic is dialogue between faith groups found in Utah.
- Word of the Kingdom with Ernest Khokhar – a television ministry of Miracle Rock International Ministries, where Pastor Khokhar hosts bible study, interviews, and call-in prayer lines.

== Technical information ==
=== Subchannels ===
The station's signal is multiplexed:

Subchannels of KTMW
Subchannel	Res.	Short name	Programming
20.1	720p	KTMW	Telemundo
20.2	480i	Xitos	TeleXitos
20.3	480i	Nosey	Nosey
20.4	480i	CRIMES	NBC True CRMZ
20.5	480i	Oxygen	Oxygen

=== Analog-to-digital conversion ===
Because it was granted an original construction permit after the FCC finalized the DTV allotment plan on April 21, 1997, the station did not receive a companion channel for a digital television station. KTMW shut down its analog signal, over UHF channel 20, on June 12, 2009, and "flash-cut" its digital signal into operation UHF channel 20. KTMW used NVerzion Automation to complete the flash cut.

=== Translators ===
- Logan: K17II-D
- Ogden: KULX-CD
- Park City: KULU-LD
- Salt Lake City: KEJT-CD

=== ATSC 3.0 lighthouse ===
Subchannels of KEJT-CD (ATSC 3.0)
Subchannel	Res.	Short name	Programming
5.1	1080p	KSL-NX	NBC (KSL-TV)
13.1	1080p	KSTU-NX	Fox (KSTU)
50.1	1080p	KEJT-NX	Telemundo

Subchannel broadcast with digital rights management
