= KKAT (AM) =

- Salt Lake City, Utah; United States
- Broadcast area: Salt Lake City metropolitan area
- Frequency: 860 kHz

Programming
- Format: Talk radio
- Affiliations: CBS News Radio; Fox News Radio; Premiere Networks; Westwood One

Ownership
- Owner: Cumulus Media; (Radio License Holding CBC, LLC)
- Sister stations: KBEE, KBER, KENZ, KHTB, KUBL-FM

History
- First air date: November 15, 1954; 71 years ago
- Former call signs: KWHO (1954–1985); KUTR (1985–1989); KLZX (1989–1990); KCNR (1990–1992); KLZX (1992–1995); KAPN (1995–1999); KBEE (1999–2004)

Technical information
- Licensing authority: FCC
- Facility ID: 11232
- Class: D
- Power: 10,000 watts (day); 3,000 watts (critical hours); 196 watts (night)
- Transmitter coordinates: 40°42′47″N 111°55′53″W

Links
- Public license information: Public file; LMS
- Webcast: Listen live
- Website: www.860kkat.com

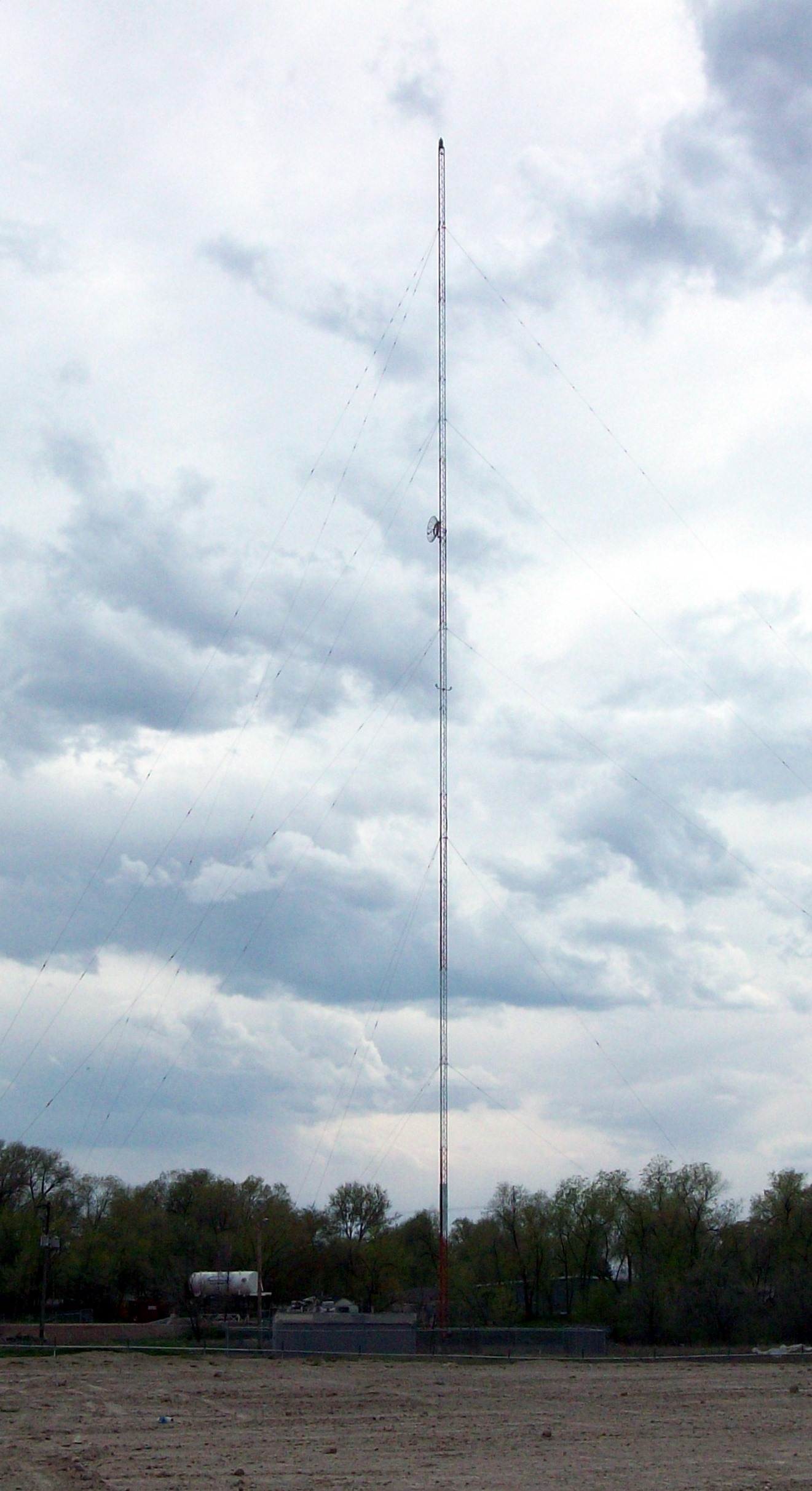
The radio tower for KKAT (AM), also shared with KBJA.

KKAT (860 kHz) is an AM radio station broadcasting a talk radio format. KKAT is licensed to Salt Lake City, Utah, and is owned by Cumulus Media. The station's studios are located in South Salt Lake (behind the I-15/I-80 interchange).

KKAT broadcasts at 10,000 watts by day but must reduce its power to 196 watts at night because it is on a clear channel frequency reserved for CJBC Toronto, the dominant Class A station on 860 kHz. During critical hours, KKAT transmits with 3,000 watts. It uses a non-directional antenna at all times. The transmitter is off West 2590 South, near the Redwood Nature Area in West Valley City.

== Programming ==
KKAT carries mostly nationally syndicated conservative talk hosts, largely from the co-owned Westwood One Network. Shows include Armstrong & Getty, Ben Shapiro, Dan Bongino, Dave Ramsey, Mark Levin, John Batchelor, Michael Knowles, Red Eye Radio and First Light.

On weekends, shows on money, real estate, gardening, real estate, food and wine are heard, as well as Chris Plante, Daniele Lin and repeats of weekday shows. World and national news from Fox News Radio airs at the beginning of most hours.

== History ==
On November 15, 1955, the station first signed on the air under the call sign KWHO. The station aired a classical music format. Initially, KWHO operated during daytime hours only with 1,000 watts of power.

In July 1985, the station became KUTR, and it began airing an "LDS Contemporary" format, which consisted of mix of music that was 50% songs by Mormon artists and 50% standard soft adult contemporary. On June 21, 1989, the station's callsign was changed to KLZX, and it began simulcasting the classic rock format of its sister station 93.3 KLZX-FM (now KUBL-FM).

On November 15, 1990, the station changed its call letters to KCNR. As KCNR, the station carried programming from CNN Headline News and was branded "News Radio 860 AM." In 1992, KCNR's format and call sign moved to 1320 AM, and the station again simulcast its classic rock sister station 93.3 KLZX-FM "Z-93". On August 11, 1992, the station again changed its call sign to KLZX. On September 6, 1994, the station began airing an all-news format from Associated Press Newsworld, and on January 23, 1995, the station's call sign was changed to KAPN. On August 20, 1996, KCNR's news/talk format moved from 1320 to 860, and on September 20, 1996, the station's call sign was changed back to KCNR.

Previous logo

On November 18, 1996, the station became an affiliate of Radio Disney. On March 3, 1999, the station's callsign was changed to KBEE. On May 1, 2003, Radio Disney moved to AM 910, and on May 15, 2003, the station began airing a classic country format from the Jones Radio Network. While a classic country station, the station was branded "The Coyote". On July 5, 2004, the station's callsign was changed to KKAT. In October 2007, the station changed formats from classic country to oldies, carrying Scott Shannon's The True Oldies Channel from Citadel Media. While airing an oldies format, the station was branded "The Wolf". On October 5, 2009, the station changed to a talk format branded "Utah's Big Talker".

== See also ==
- KKLV - former sister station.
