= Farnsworth Peak =

Mountain in Utah, United States

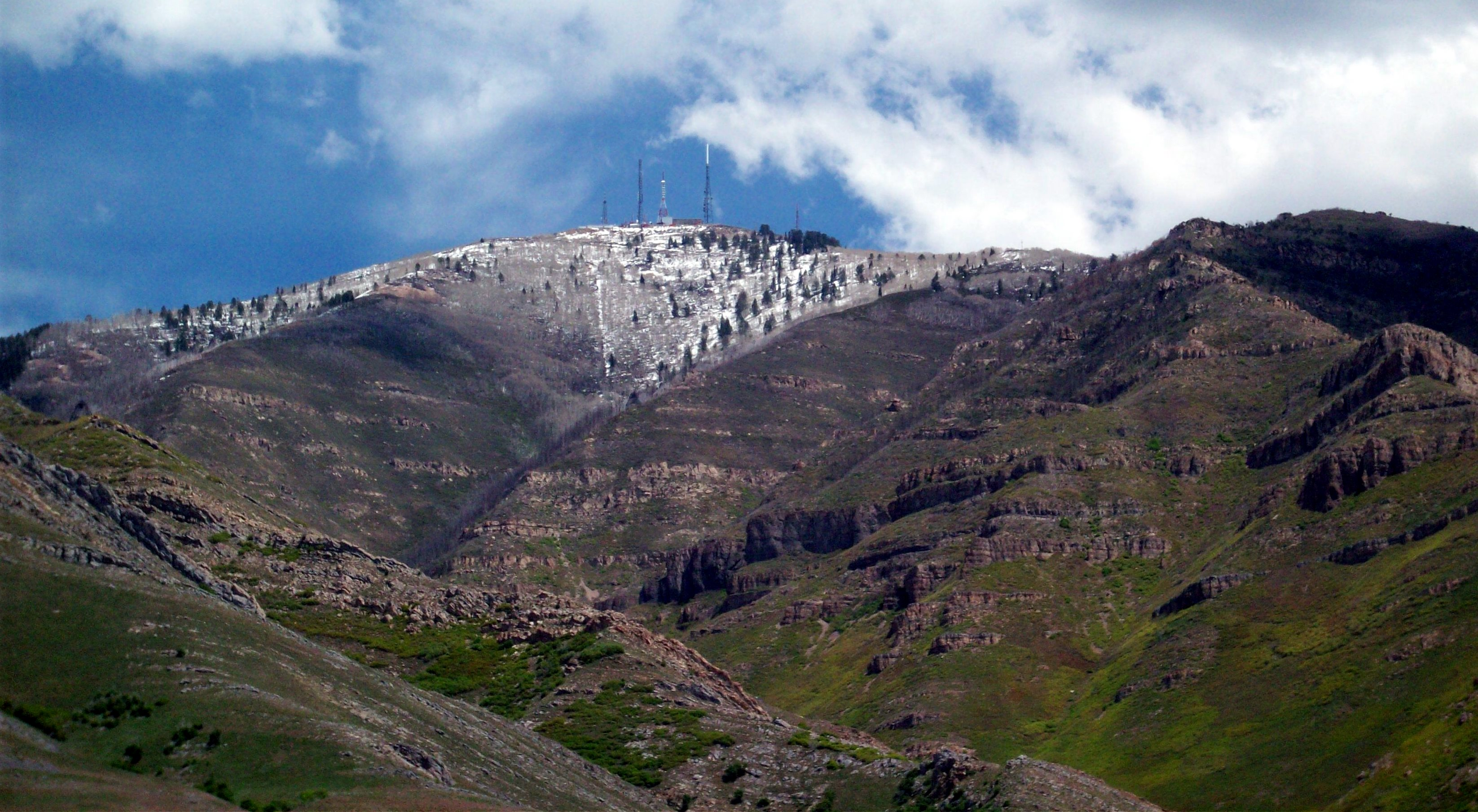
- Farnsworth Peak from the west face in May 2008

Highest point
- Elevation: 9,039 ft (2,755 m) NAVD 88
- Prominence: 1,243 ft (379 m)
- Coordinates: 40°39′33″N 112°12′10″W

Naming
- Etymology: Philo Farnsworth

Geography
- Location within Utah
- Location: Salt Lake / Tooele counties, Utah, U.S.
- Parent range: Oquirrh Mountains

Climbing
- Easiest route: Hike or private road

Farnsworth Peak is a peak located on the northern end of the Oquirrh Mountain range, approximately 3.5 miles (6 km) southeast of Lake Point, Utah, and 18 miles (29 km) southwest of Salt Lake City, Utah, United States. The mountain is named for Philo Farnsworth, the inventor of the first completely electronic television. It is used mainly for radio and television transmission, but could potentially become part of a ski resort owned by nearby Kennecott Land. On the eastern side of the mountain, the land is completely private, and access is restricted. The peak can be reached by hiking from the Tooele side, which is mostly public land. The Bureau of Land Management land extends from Ridge Peak west to the base of the mountain. Public access to this land is available off SR-36 near Lake Point, Utah. Several cattle gates need to be opened and closed, but are access roads to hiking, mountain biking, and horseback riding areas.

== Radio and television use ==
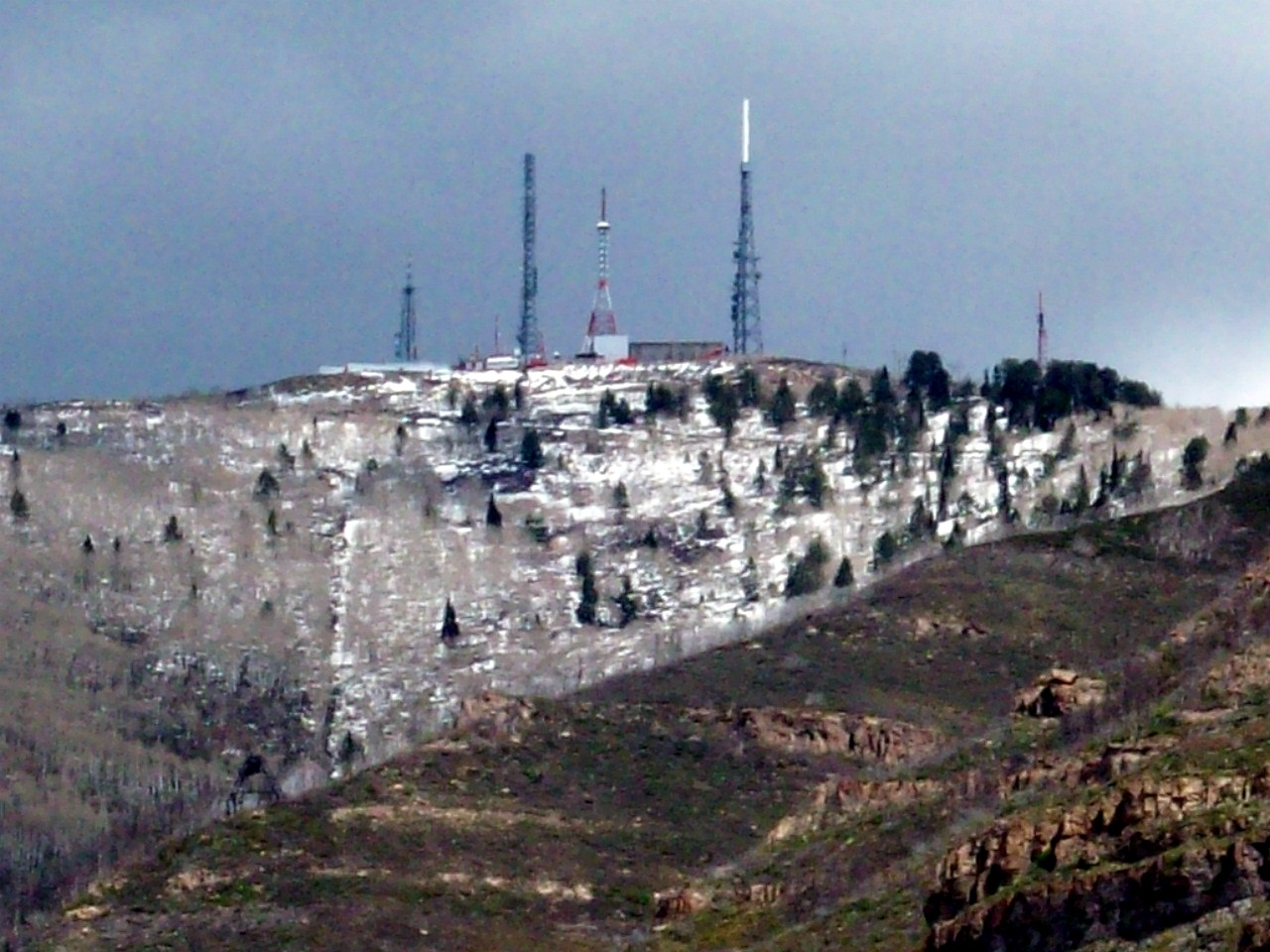
A closeup of "Big" Farnsworth, which houses transmitters for KSL-TV, among others

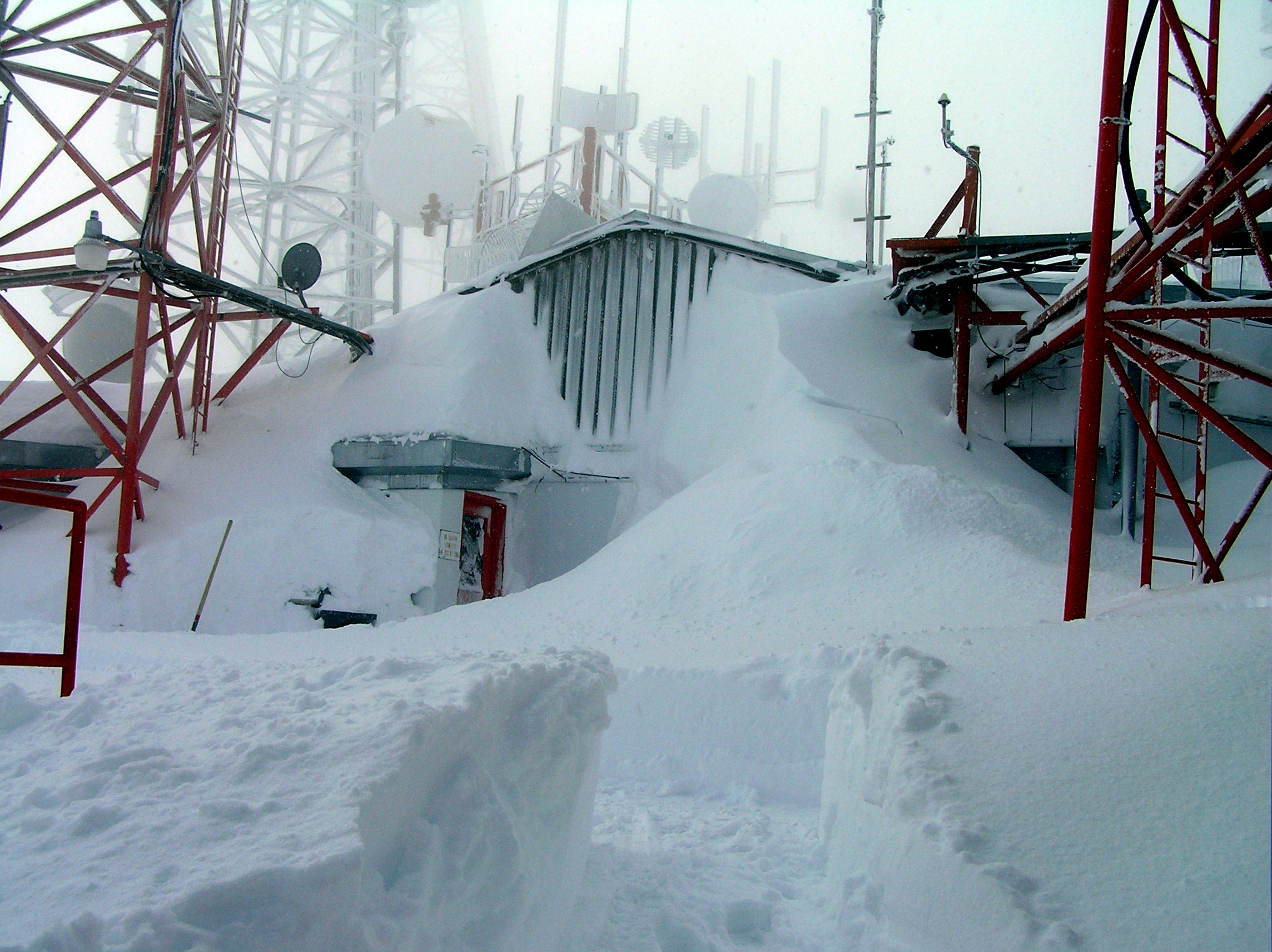
Deep snow covers the transmitter site. The mountain is often only accessible by snow machines, snowmobiles or helicopter.

Farnsworth Peak, in local radio terms, refers to three separate radio transmitter sites. They are known as "Big Farnsworth," "The KSTU Site," and "Little Farnsworth." Each site hosts a number of transmission towers which broadcast radio and television stations. Extensive studies of RF radiation from the site were conducted in 2003 in an effort to aid engineers who work on the mountain.

== FM terrestrial station transmitters ==
Farnsworth Peak contains a vast majority of Salt Lake FM signals. The following is a complete list of FM stations with transmitters located on (or around) Farnsworth Peak.

CALLSIGN	FREQUENCY	FORMAT
KUER	90.1	Public radio/news
KRCL	90.9	Public radio
KUUU	92.5	Hip hop
KUBL	93.3	Country
KODJ	94.1	Classic hits
KXRK	96.3	Alternative rock
KZHT	97.1	CHR
KBZN	97.9	Hot adult contemporary
KBEE	98.7	Adult contemporary
KSFI	100.3	Soft adult contemporary
KBER	101.1	Active rock
KHTB	101.9	CHR
KSL-FM	102.7	News/Talk
KRSP	103.5	Classic rock
KSOP-FM	104.3	Country
KUDD	105.1	Top 40/CHR
KNRS	105.9	News/Talk
KAAZ-FM	106.7	Rock
KKLV	107.5	Contemporary Christian

== FM amateur (ham) radio repeaters ==
Local television stations KSL-TV, KSTU, and other sites on Farnsworth Peak have provided space for amateur radio repeater operation. Farnsworth peak serves as a major hub, connecting western and southern Utah to the Utah Intermountain Intertie main hub repeater a top the Snowbird Tram on Hidden Peak.

CALLSIGN	FREQUENCY	OFFSET	TONE	SITE	
KI7DX	53.15 MHz	(-) 1.0 MHz	146.2 Hz	KSTU	
KF6RAL	145.125 MHz	(-) 0.6 MHz			D-Star
W7SP	146.62 MHz	(-) 0.6 MHz		KSL-TV	
K7JL	146.94 MHz	(-) 0.6 MHz	88.5 Hz	KSTU	
K7JL	147.12 MHz	(+) 0.6 MHz	100.0 Hz	KSTU	
KF6RAL	448.075 MHz	(-) 5.0 MHz			D-Star
KI7DX	448.15 MHz	(-) 5.0 MHz	127.3 Hz	KSTU	
K7JL	449.15 MHz	(-) 5.0 MHz	100.0 Hz		
K7JL	449.5 MHz	(-) 5.0 MHz	100.0 Hz		
K7OJU	1285. MHz	(-) 12.0 MHz	88.5 Hz		
KF6RAL	1287. MHz	(-) 12.0 MHz			D-Star
KF6RAL	1299.25 MHz	simplex			D-Star

== Television stations ==
Farnsworth Peak is home to several full-service television stations. KSL-TV is perhaps the best-known transmitter site on the mountain, but the peak houses transmitters for KSTU-TV, the local Fox affiliate, KUCW (The CW), and KUTV (CBS), among others. KTMW, an independent station and KUPX, the local Ion affiliate, now broadcast their digital signals from Little Farnsworth Peak about 0.45 miles (0.72 km) to the south. KSL-TV was the first television station to use the mountain for broadcasting. It also is responsible for transmitters on the mountain, having engineers on-site for periods of time in case of emergencies. A large number of the television stations located on the peak previously carried their analog signals from the same sites. Farnsworth Peak was one of the first places in the United States to construct a facility specifically for digital television transmission. In particular, Farnsworth Peak houses transmitters for the following stations:

Call sign	Channel (via PSIP)	Network
KUTV	2	CBS
KTVX	4	ABC
KSL-TV	5	NBC
KUED	7	PBS
KUEN	9	Independent
KULX-CD	10	Telemundo
KBYU	11	BYU TV
KSTU	13	Fox
KJZZ-TV	14	Independent
KUPX	16	Ion Television
KTMW	20	Telemundo
KBTU-LD	23	MundoMax
KPNZ	24	Estrella TV
KSVN-CD	25	Azteca
KUCW	30	The CW
KSUD-LD	33	Daystar
K39JS-D	39	Azteca (translator of KSVN-CD)
KEJT-CD	50	Telemundo

== Lightning incident ==
On September 13, 2009, lightning struck the tower carrying a majority of the area's digital television signals. The lightning strike took eight stations in total off the air, and damaged the combiner for the tower. According to the engineers on site, the combiner was leaking oil. The lightning strike of the tower also caused a failure of the waveguide switch control system, which caused it to display improperly. A waveguide switch is part of the transmission circuitry. An engineer on site was able to correct that situation within hours, but the combiner would not be working for a few more hours. By the next day, the problem had been fixed and the stations were back on the air and all were in working order.

== 2020 Salt Lake City earthquake ==
On March 18, 2020, a 5.7-magnitude earthquake occurred 3.7 miles (6 km) north-northeast of Magna, Utah, east of Farnsworth Peak. A number of radio and television stations experienced interruptions after power was lost on the mountain, but were able to return to air within seconds. Farnsworth Peak has generators for emergencies.

== See also ==
- List of mountains in Utah
- Oquirrh Mountains
- Lake Point, Utah
