= KENZ (FM) =

Contemporary hit radio station in Salt Lake City

- Provo, Utah; United States
- Broadcast area: Salt Lake City metropolitan area
- Frequency: 94.9 MHz
- Branding: Power 94.9 / 101.9

Programming
- Language: English
- Format: Contemporary hit radio

Ownership
- Owner: Cumulus Media; (Radio License Holding CBC, LLC)
- Sister stations: KBEE; KBER; KHTB; KKAT; KUBL-FM

History
- First air date: 1981
- Former call signs: KLRZ (1981–1986); KBNG (1986–1987); KTOU (1987–1989); KZHT (1989–2004); KPHT (1/6/2004–1/16/2004); KMXU (1/16/2004–1/27/2004); KHTB (2004–2015)

Technical information
- Licensing authority: FCC
- Facility ID: 6545
- Class: C
- ERP: 48,000 watts
- HAAT: 853 meters (2,799 ft)
- Transmitter coordinates: 40°16′58″N 111°56′11″W
- Repeater: 101.9 KHTB (Ogden)

Links
- Public license information: Public file; LMS
- Webcast: Listen live
- Website: www.powerslc.com

KENZ (94.9 FM, Power 94.9 / 101.9) is a commercial radio station licensed to Provo, Utah and serving the Salt Lake City metropolitan area. It broadcasts a contemporary hit radio format simulcast with 101.9 KHTB Ogden and is owned and operated by Cumulus Media. The radio studios are located in South Salt Lake, near the I-15/I-80 interchange.

KENZ has an effective radiated power (ERP) of 48,000 watts. The transmitter is on Lake Mountain in Saratoga Springs, Utah.

== History ==
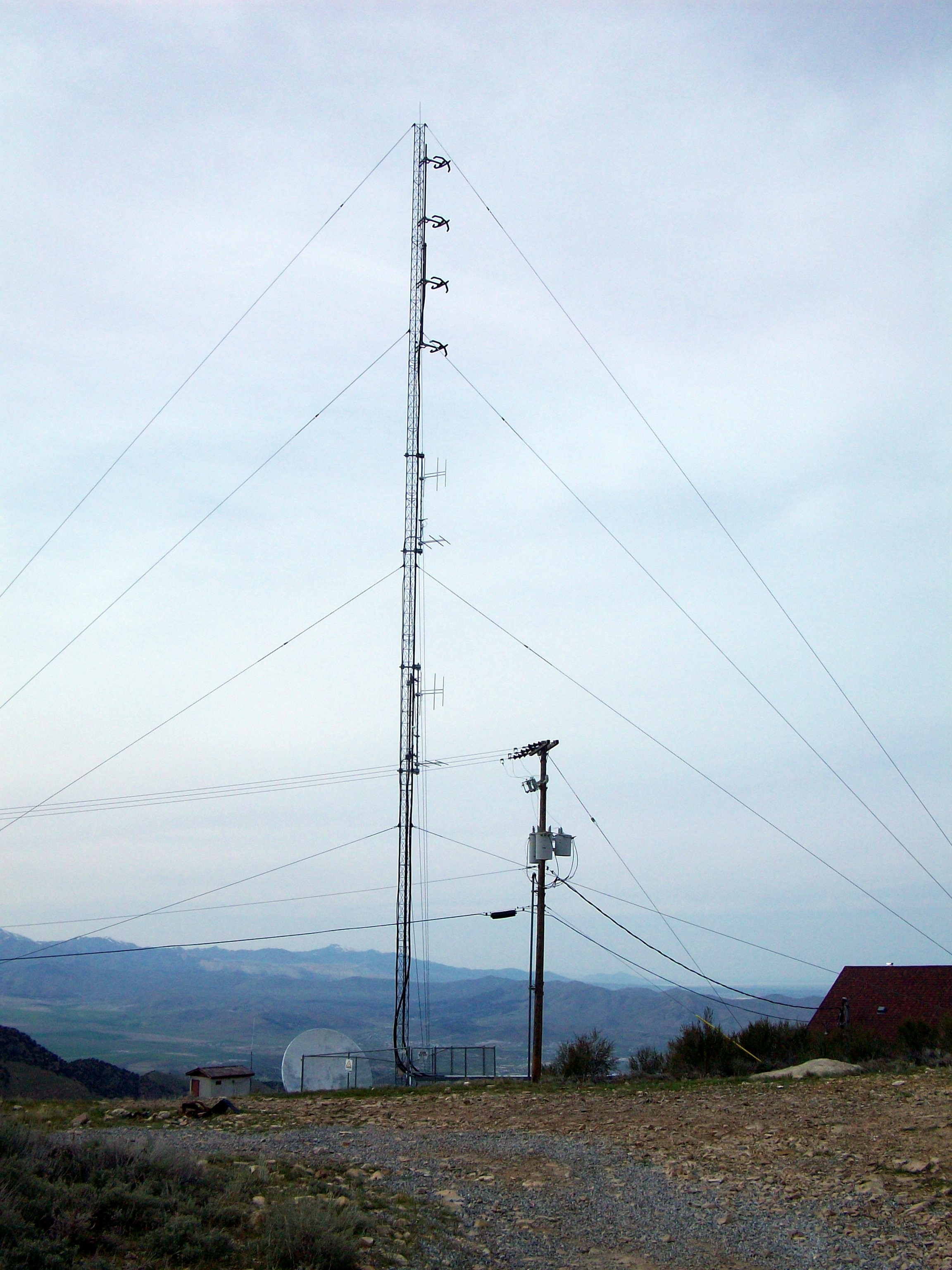
KENZ's radio tower, located atop Lake Mountain.

Equivox Incorporated, owner of Provo radio station KEYY, received the construction permit for a new radio station in Provo on September 12, 1974, though it had to be granted again on March 12, 1975, because the check did not clear. The station was then built as KRMQ; however, it was not built with strict adherence to the construction permit. In 1981, the Federal Communications Commission (FCC) fined Equivox $20,000 for its "inexperience, undue haste, and a careless disregard for errors".

Equivox was purchased by B. Eric Rhoads in November 1981; Rhoads had been trying to buy the stations for 18 months. After stunting with The Beatles music, the station relaunched as adult contemporary KLRZ "Colors 95" on January 1, 1982. Under Rhoads, KLRZ emphasized promotion, at one point putting a car on a billboard.

Equivox sold KLRZ to General Broadcasting Corporation of Los Angeles in 1986. The station was initially relaunched as KBNG that August before shifting to a soft album oriented rock format under KTOU call letters the next year.

=== Rhythmic Top 40 (1989–1997) ===
The format lasted a few years before the station became "Hot 94-9" KZHT, and the format changed to rhythmic Top 40 with a hybrid mix of Dance and Modern tracks.

=== Top 40 (1997–2003) ===
The station, as Top 40 "94-9 ZHT" was popular among youth along the Wasatch Front. KZHT moved up the dial to 97.1 FM in December 2003, taking over KISN-FM and maintained the Top 40 format.

=== Rock (2004–2013) ===
The former KZHT became KHTB with a Rock format branded as "94-9 The Blaze" the following month on January 14, 2004. The reason for the move was primarily based on signal. The 94.9 transmitter is located on Lake Mountain south of Salt Lake, and west of Provo, while 97.1's transmitter is located on Farnsworth Peak.

In August 2008, Citadel acquired the frequency and "The Blaze" moved to 97.5 which was then the defunct KOAY. KHTB then became known as 94.9 Z-Rock, an active rock station going up against KXRK. Sister station KBER moved to classic rock at the same time. Citadel merged with Cumulus Media on September 16, 2011.

=== Alternative rock (2013–2015) ===
On September 2, 2013, KHTB shifted to an alternative rock format, branded as "ALT 94.9".

=== Classic hip hop (2015–2017) ===
On September 4, 2015, 94.9 began simulcasting on KENZ as part of a format transfer. 94.9 and 101.9 simulcasted for the weekend, while directing listeners to the latter frequency. On September 8, at 5 pm, KHTB ended the simulcast with KENZ and switched to a classic hip hop format, branded as "94.9 The Vibe". On September 23, KHTB and KENZ swapped call letters.

=== Top 40 (2017–present) ===
On January 25, 2017, at 4 p.m., KENZ flipped to contemporary hit radio, branded as "Power 94-9". The flip brings the format back to the 94.9 frequency for the first time in 13 years. Power’s lineup is Dallace Jade from 10 am–3 pm, Rick Vaughn from 3 pm–7 pm, Adam Bomb from 7 pm–10 pm

On October 31, 2019, KENZ and KHTB returned to a simulcast.

== Previous logos ==
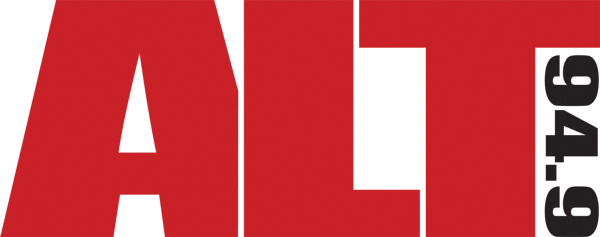

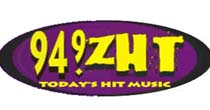
