= KSOP (AM) =

- South Salt Lake, Utah; United States
- Broadcast area: Salt Lake City metropolitan area
- Frequency: 1370 kHz
- Branding: Classic Country 1370

Programming
- Format: Classic country
- Affiliations: Utah Grizzlies

Ownership
- Owner: KSOP, Inc.
- Sister stations: KSOP-FM

History
- First air date: February 1955
- Last air date: June 2025
- Call sign meaning: Salt Lake, Ogden, Provo

Technical information
- Licensing authority: FCC
- Facility ID: 35626
- Class: B
- Power: 5,000 watts day; 500 watts night
- Transmitter coordinates: 40°43′11.8″N 111°55′44.8″W
- Repeater: 104.3 KSOP-FM HD2 (Salt Lake City)

Links
- Public license information: Public file; LMS

KSOP (1370 kHz) was an AM radio station broadcasting a classic country format. Licensed to South Salt Lake, Utah, United States, the station served the Salt Lake City metropolitan area. The station was owned by KSOP, Inc. Its studios were located near Redwood Road in Salt Lake City, while its transmitter site was west of downtown. KSOP operated from 1955 to 2025.

== History ==
Both KSOP and KSOP-FM broadcast country music since their first air dates. The AM station went on the air in February 1955; KSOP-FM would be added on December 10, 1964. KSOP was founded by Henry Hilton, a Utah native who had worked in other local radio stations before starting KSOP. In its first four months on the air, the KSOP playlist featured a mix of pop and country music, as Hilton was hesitant to commit to a full-time country format. KSOP initially operated during the day only.

From December 1964 through spring 2002, KSOP was a simulcast of KSOP-FM. In May 2002, KSOP flipped to a classic country format.

In May 2025, KSOP announced that the AM station would close on June 1 after 70 years of operation. The classic country programming would continue as an Internet radio station, but was removed from KSOP-FM's second HD Radio channel. The KSOP AM license was surrendered in September 2026; by then, the ksopcountry.com Internet radio station had been closed as well. It was cancelled on September 8. The Hilton family continues to operate KSOP-FM.
