= KBEE =

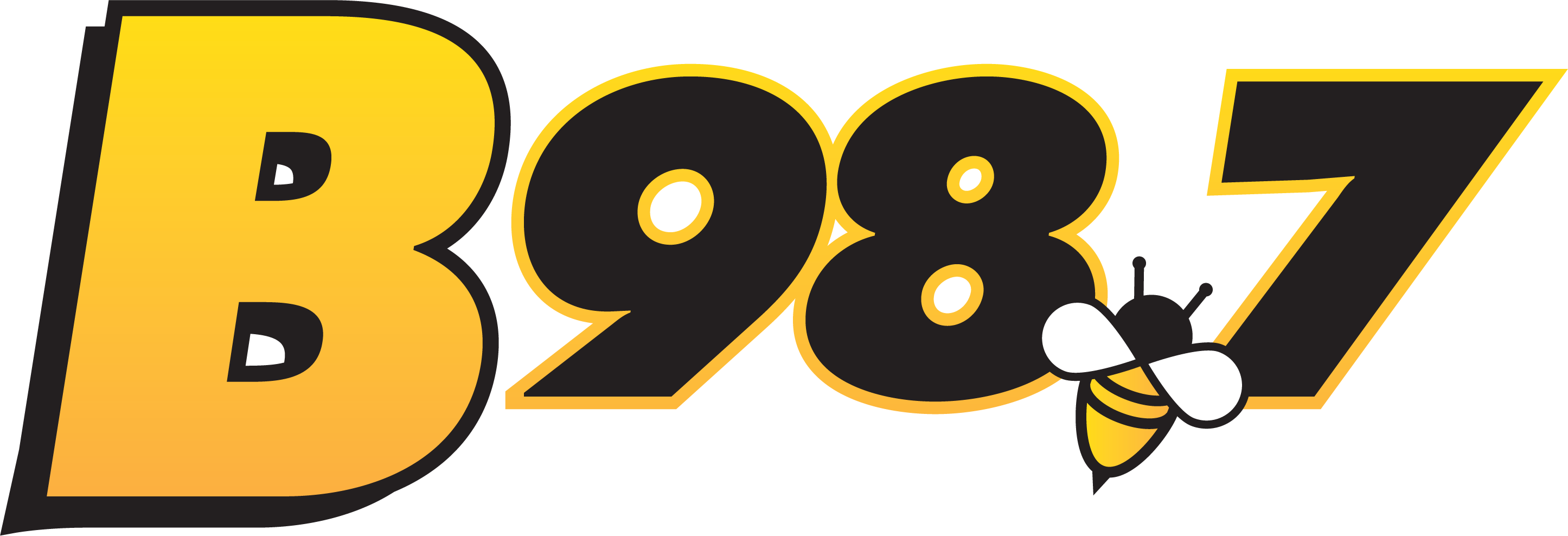
- Salt Lake City, Utah; United States
- Broadcast area: Salt Lake City-Ogden-Provo, Utah
- Frequency: 98.7 MHz (HD Radio)
- Branding: B98.7

Programming
- Format: Adult contemporary

Ownership
- Owner: Cumulus Media; (Radio License Holding CBC, LLC)
- Sister stations: KBER, KENZ, KHTB, KKAT, KUBL-FM

History
- First air date: 1947 (as KDYL-FM)
- Former call signs: KDYL-FM (1947–1959); KCPX-FM (1959–1993); KVRI (1993–1995)
- Call sign meaning: K Bee

Technical information
- Facility ID: 53497
- Class: C
- ERP: 40,000 watts
- HAAT: 894 meters (2933 ft)
- Transmitter coordinates: 40°36′30″N 112°9′34″W

Links
- Webcast: Listen Live
- Website: b987.com

KBEE (98.7 FM), branded as B98.7, is a commercial radio station in Salt Lake City, Utah. It is one of the oldest FM stations in the Western United States, tracing its history to 1947. The station is owned by Cumulus Media, and it airs an adult contemporary radio format. KBEE's studios are located in South Salt Lake (behind the I-15/I-80 interchange). The station is also broadcast on HD radio.

== History ==
=== Early years (1947–1959) ===
In 1947, the station first signed on as KDYL-FM, the sister station to KDYL, one of the first AM radio stations in Utah, which went on the air in 1922. KDYL-FM mostly simulcast its AM counterpart through its early years. The owner, Sidney S. Fox, is considered a pioneer in Utah broadcasting history. Two years later, in 1949, he put Salt Lake City's first TV station on the air, KDYL-TV (now KTVX).

In 1953, Fox sold KDYL-AM-FM-TV to publisher Time-Life Corporation for $2.1 million.

=== Top 40 (1959–1967) ===
In 1959, the stations were purchased by Columbia Pictures and the radio stations' call signs were changed to KCPX and KCPX-FM. The two stations carried a Top 40 format that was very popular in the Salt Lake City area. During this time, the stations competed heavily for listeners with crosstown rival 1280 KNAK (now KZNS).

=== Rock (1967–1983) ===
In 1967, the Federal Communications Commission required FM stations in medium to large cities to be programmed separately from their AM sister stations for most of the day. KCPX-FM switched to an album rock format, while KCPX continued as a Top 40 station.

=== Top 40 (1983–1990) ===
On August 26, 1983, when KCPX (AM) left the Top 40 format, KCPX-FM picked up its CHR format, first known as HitRock 99 KCPX, HitRadio 99 KCPX, and then as Power 99. Columbia Pictures, which had just been acquired by The Coca-Cola Company, sold KCPX and KCPX-FM to Price Broadcasting in 1982. (The TV station had been sold to separate owners in 1975.)

=== Adult contemporary (1990–1992) ===
KCPX-FM's Top 40/CHR format would last until October 4, 1990, when the station flipped to adult contemporary as "K98.7".

=== Hot adult contemporary (1992–2002) ===
In December 1992, KCPX shifted to hot adult contemporary as Variety 98.7, KVRI. In May 1995, after Citadel Broadcasting bought the station, the station rebranded as "B98.7" and adopted the KBEE call letters. The station's music focus has varied slightly over the past decade, leaning towards a more Modern AC direction for a time.

=== Adult contemporary (2002–2010) ===
In 2002, the station returned to its roots as an AC station as "B98.7."

Over the seventeen-year period from 1985 to 2002, the station saw 18 different morning teams. The long-time "Fisher, Todd, and Erin" morning team on competing station KISN broke up in August 2001. Citadel Broadcasting poached Todd and Erin Collard to host a new morning show on KBEE, though a no-compete clause in the married couple's previous contract kept the pair off the air from October 2001 to February 14, 2002.

=== Adult top 40 (2010–2012) ===
In 2010, the station evolved to adult top 40.

Citadel merged with Cumulus Media on September 16, 2011.

=== Adult contemporary (2012–2013) ===
By February 2012, the station reverted to mainstream AC.

=== Adult top 40 (2013–2015) ===
On July 3, 2013, KBEE again moved to adult top 40. The station briefly aired the syndicated Kidd Kraddick morning show, just before the host's unexpected death.

=== Adult contemporary (2015–present) ===
On March 6, 2015, KBEE returned to adult contemporary.

=== Utah Jazz ===
For several years in the early 2000s, KBEE simulcasted the games of the Utah Jazz basketball team, also carried on co-owned sports radio KFNZ. The Jazz are now heard on KZNS and KZNS-FM.

== Signal ==
From atop Nelson Peak, 10 miles (16 km) west of West Jordan, Utah, the station has an effective radiated power of 40,000 watts, which makes KBEE audible throughout most of north central Utah, including all of the Wasatch Front. The station has a height above average terrain of 894 metres (2,933 ft). KBEE also operates two translator stations, 92.3 K222CM in Heber City and 95.3 K237AL in Park City.

== History of Callsign ==
The callsign KBEE-FM was previously assigned to a station in Modesto, California. That station began broadcasting April 3, 1948, on 103.3 MHz. It was owned by the McClatchy Company, which publishes the Modesto Bee newspaper, from where it got its call letters.

== Former logos ==
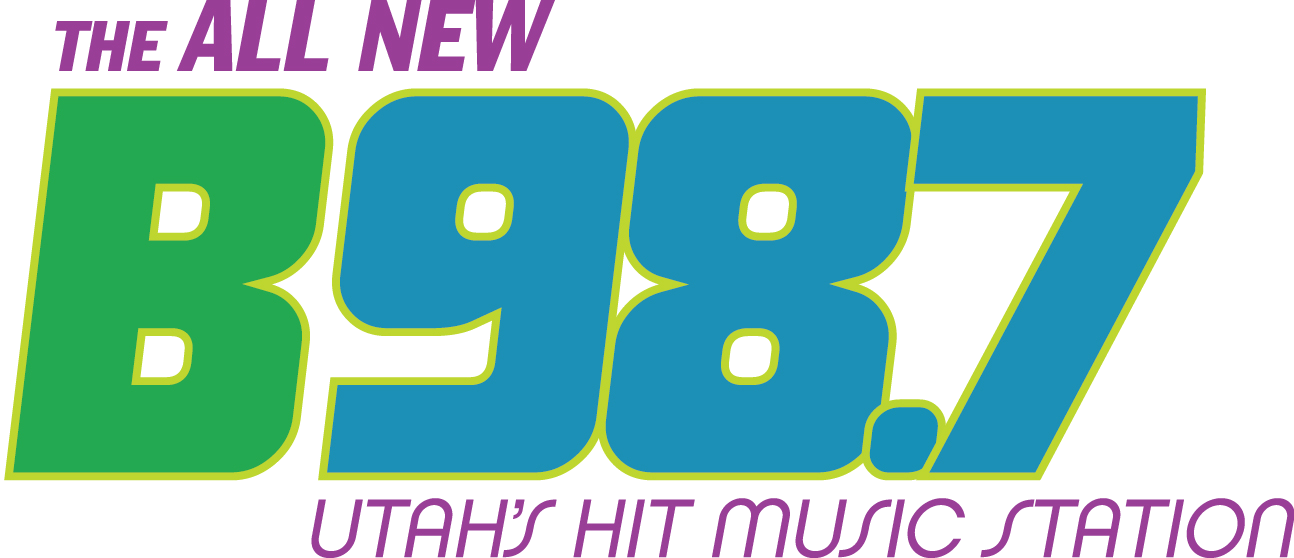
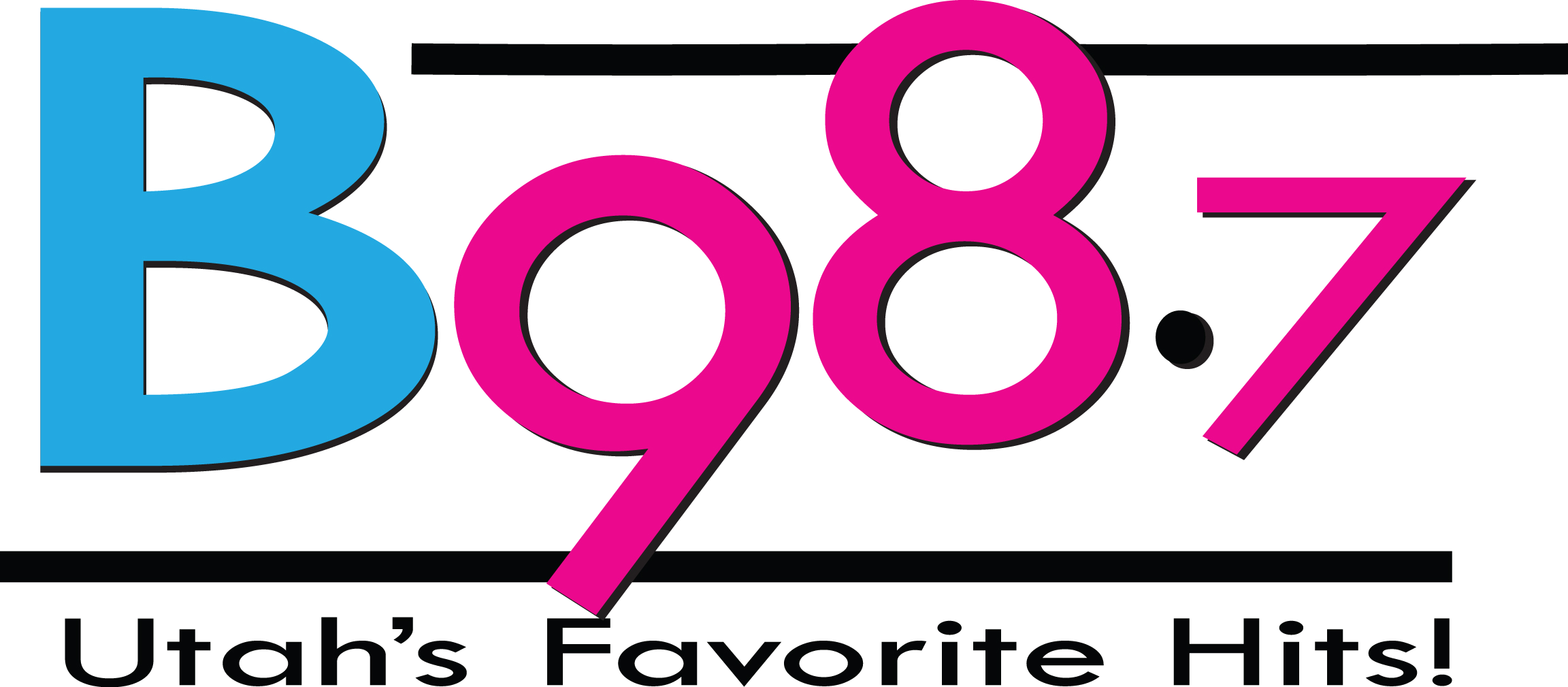
