= KUBL-FM =

Country music radio station in Salt Lake City

- Salt Lake City, Utah; United States
- Broadcast area: Salt Lake City metropolitan area
- Frequency: 93.3 MHz
- Branding: 93.3 The Bull

Programming
- Format: Country
- Affiliations: Westwood One

Ownership
- Owner: Cumulus Media; (Radio License Holding CBC, LLC)
- Sister stations: KBEE, KBER, KENZ, KHTB, KKAT

History
- First air date: July 31, 1965; 61 years ago (as KWHO-FM)
- Former call signs: KWHO-FM (1965–1984); KLTQ-FM (1984–1988); KLZX (1988–1989); KLZX-FM (1989–1995); KUBL (1995–2000)
- Call sign meaning: The BULL (referring to the animal)

Technical information
- Licensing authority: FCC
- Facility ID: 11238
- Class: C
- ERP: 25,000 watts
- HAAT: 1,140 meters (3,740 ft)
- Transmitter coordinates: 40°39′34″N 112°12′5″W (atop Farnsworth Peak)

Links
- Public license information: Public file; LMS
- Webcast: Listen live
- Website: 933thebull.com

KUBL-FM (93.3 MHz) is a commercial radio station in Salt Lake City, Utah, branded as “93.3 The Bull“. It is owned by Cumulus Media and it broadcasts a country music format. The studios are on Bearcat Drive near the I-15/I-80 interchange in South Salt Lake.

KUBL-FM has an effective radiated power (ERP) of 25,000 watts. Its transmitter site is in Erda, southwest of the city on Farnsworth Peak in the Oquirrh Mountains.

== History ==
The station signed on the air on July 31, 1965. Its original call sign was KWHO-FM, the sister station to KWHO 860 AM (now KKAT). The stations had studios on East 2nd Street. Because the AM station was a daytimer, required to go off the air at night, KWHO-FM was able to keep their simulcast programming going into the evening.

By the 1970s, the two stations had separate programming. KWHO-FM began airing an automated Top 40 format. KWHO-FM was broadcasting at 37,000 watts but with a tower at minus 93 feet. So its reach was only in and around Salt Lake City.

In 1984 the station had a soft adult contemporary format and was known as KLTQ-FM. Then in 1988, it switched its call letters to KLZX, becoming a competitor to KRSP-FM and carried a classic hits and classic rock format. That format lasted seven years.

On May 8, 1995, KLZX made a big change. It became "K-Bull 93" KUBL, switching from classic rock to the current country format. On September 13, 2022, KUBL was rebranded as "93.3 The Bull".

Former logo

In January 2023, The Lexi and Banks Morning Show was dismissed. The current wake-up program is The Jesse James Morning Show. In June of 2025 the Jesse James Morning Show moved to WKDF in Nashville. The show is now rebroadcast from Nashville on KUBL, leaving the station without a locally produced morning show.

== Awards and nominations ==
| Year | Association | Category | Recipient | Result | Ref |
|---|---|---|---|---|---|
| 2009 | Academy of Country Music Awards | On-Air Personality of the Year - Large Market | Johnson & Johnson Morning Show | Nominated | |
| 2017 | Academy of Country Music Awards | Radio Station of the Year - Large Market | Station | Nominated | |
| 2017 | Academy of Country Music Awards | On-Air Personality of the Year - Large Market | Johnson & Johnson Morning Show | Nominated | |
| 2018 | Country Music Association Awards | Radio Station of the Year - Large Market | Station | Nominated | |
| 2018 | Academy of Country Music Awards | Radio Station of the Year - Large Market | Station | Won | |
| 2018 | Academy of Country Music Awards | On-Air Personality of the Year - Large Market | Lexi & Banks Morning Show | Nominated | |
| 2019 | NAB Marconi Radio Awards | Country Station of the Year | Station | Nominated | |
| 2019 | Country Music Association Awards | Radio Station of the Year - Large Market | Station | Nominated | |
| 2019 | Academy of Country Music Awards | On-Air Personality of the Year - Large Market | Lexi & Banks Morning Show | Won | |
| 2020 | Academy of Country Music Awards | Radio Station of the Year - Large Market | Station | Nominated | |
| 2020 | Country Music Association Awards | On-Air Personality of the Year - Large Market | Lexi & Banks Morning Show | Nominated | |
| 2021 | Academy of Country Music Awards | Radio Station of the Year - Large Market | Station | Nominated | |
