= KHTB =

Simulcasts KENZ, Provo
- Ogden, Utah; United States
- Broadcast area: Salt Lake City-Ogden-Provo
- Frequency: 101.9 MHz
- Branding: Power 94.9/101.9

Programming
- Format: Top 40 (CHR)

Ownership
- Owner: Cumulus Media; (Radio License Holding CBC, LLC)
- Sister stations: KBEE, KBER, KENZ, KKAT, KUBL-FM

History
- First air date: 1964 (as KBOC)
- Former call signs: KBOC (1964–1975); KQPD (1975–1984); KKAT (1984–2004); KPQP (2004–2005); KENZ (2005–2015)

Technical information
- Licensing authority: FCC
- Facility ID: 2444
- Class: C
- ERP: 25,000 watts
- HAAT: 1,140 meters (3,740 ft)
- Transmitter coordinates: 40°39′34″N 112°12′5″W

Links
- Public license information: Public file; LMS
- Webcast: Listen live
- Website: powerslc.com

KHTB (101.9 FM) is a commercial radio station licensed to Provo, Utah, and serving the Salt Lake City metropolitan area. It is owned by Cumulus Media and broadcasts a top 40 (CHR) radio format, simulcast with 94.9 KENZ Provo. The radio studios are in South Salt Lake, near the I-15/I-80 interchange.

KHTB has an effective radiated power of 25,000 watts. The transmitter is southwest of the city on Farnsworth Peak in the Oquirrh Mountains in Bingham Canyon, Utah, among the towers for other Salt Lake-area FM and TV stations.

== History ==
=== Country (1995–2004) ===
In 1995, KKAT licensed "Young Country" from Alliance Broadcasting. Also that year, Kid Cassidy (John Potter) of KWNR replaced Gary and Scotty in the mornings, with Insane Rick Shane remaining as producer. Other local hosts were T.J. Evans, "Gentleman Jim" Mickleson, Bob Wells and Tracy Chapman, while Blair Garner did the overnight shift.

KKAT took over the number one position among five country stations from KSOP-FM, the only station in the group to lose listeners. Gary and Scotty had been hired to replace Ken Simmons after Simmons' arrest for lewd behavior, and the station and the morning hosts could not overcome the stigma of that incident. But hiring Cassidy and a strong promotional effort worked.

By 1999, 101.9 rebranded as just "101.9 KKAT", and on January 18, 2002, at 5PM, after stunting with a loop of "God Bless The USA" for several hours, they rebranded again, this time as "K102", adding more classic country to their modern playlist (as evidenced by the first song after the rebrand, "Thank God I'm a Country Boy" by John Denver). It rebranded back to "101.9 KKAT" in January 2004.

=== Top 40 (2004–2005) ===
KKAT was replaced by KPQP, a Top 40 station branded as "101.9 Pop FM", in May 2004. KPQP lasted until KENZ's move to the frequency in September 2005.

=== Adult alternative (2005–2010) ===
At the end of 2005, Citadel Broadcasting moved KENZ and its adult alternative format from the 107.5 MHz frequency to the stronger and farther-reaching 101.9 MHz frequency. Even though they were no longer at the end of the dial, they retained the name.

In 2006, Bruce Jones ("Biff Raff"), The End's first and only program director at the time, announced he would be leaving KENZ and radio in general. Mike Peer, of WXRK in New York, was selected at the end of 2006 to become the new program director at KENZ. Peer had worked for Bruce Jones in Austin, Texas before Jones headed to Denver and then returned to Utah to start The End.

On December 6, 2007, Chunga announced that Mister West had left the station and the Chunga and Mister show. Chunga explained that both his and Mister's contracts were up this year and he had planned to retire at the end of the year. Citadel Broadcasting gave him a good deal and he chose to stay. Citadel management decided not to renew Mister's contract. However, according to the February 22, 2008, edition of the Deseret Morning News, Mister claims that Chunga demanded Mister be fired (as part of Chunga's own contract negotiation).

On November 18, 2008, during the Tuesday CD Review, it was announced that the Parker Show would air for the final time on November 26. Parker later said that the only reason was budget cuts and that he feels no resentment towards management for the decision. Dallan, as part of the Parker Show, was laid off at the same time.

On January 1, 2010, Chelsea Earlewine announced on her Facebook page that she was moving to California.

=== '90s Hits (2010) ===
On April 21, 2010, at 3:07 p.m., KENZ changed format and adopted a jockless "Gen X" format that focused largely on ‘90s music and released their on-air staff, with the exception of Cort Johnson, who ran all station promotions and acted as the station's sole on-air personality. This was an incredibly unpopular change, as ratings for the station tanked.

=== Alternative (2010–2013) ===
On December 21, 2010, at 3 p.m., the station reverted to the more familiar "101.9 The End" brand, returning to an Alternative format, with a music-focused morning show, "The Morning Alternative with Cort."

On July 5, 2011, after working as a weekend DJ on WTKK 96.9 in Boston, Chunga returned to KENZ to join Cort for the "Chunga & Cort" morning show. On August 29, 2011, after eleven years at KENZ Cort announced that he would be leaving the station and moving to Portland, Oregon. His last show on KENZ was two days later. Following Cort's departure the morning show was simply titled "The Chunga Show" until its cancelation in 2013.

Citadel merged with Cumulus Media on September 16, 2011.

On August 16, 2013, KENZ cancelled "The Chunga Show" and laid off the morning show staff including long-time disc jockey Jimmy Chunga, while subsequently reformatting the station from alternative to classic hits.

=== Classic Hits (2013–2014) ===
On August 16, 2013, beginning at 10 a.m. following "The Chunga Show," KENZ began stunting with a sound similar to that of Hypnotoad from Futurama. This was interspersed with an announcer saying this message: "Listen today at 12 noon for your new favorite radio station. KENZ Ogden-Salt Lake City." At noon, after a brief launch package, KENZ flipped to classic hits as "Classic Hits 101.9." The new station focuses on classic rock, mostly from the 1970s. The first song on "Classic Hits" was The Doobie Brothers' Listen to the Music.

=== Adult hits (2014–2015) ===
On June 20, 2014, at 3 p.m., KENZ changed their format to adult hits, branded as "Trax 101.9". The last song on "Classic Hits" was Money by Pink Floyd, while the first song on "Trax" was What I Like About You by The Romantics.

=== Alternative (2015–2019) ===
On September 4, 2015, at 5 p.m., 101.9 began simulcasting KHTB as part of a format transfer as "Alt 101-9", bringing the format back to 101.9 for the 3rd time, with "Alt" moving to 101.9 permanently at 5 p.m. on the 8th. The last song on "Trax" was "Waterfalls" by TLC. On September 23, 2015, KENZ changed their call letters to KHTB.

=== Top 40 (2019–present) ===
On October 31, 2019, at 6 p.m., KHTB dropped the alternative format a third time, and began another simulcast, this time permanent, of KENZ's Top 40/CHR format, as "Power 94.9/101.9". The move gives the CHR format better coverage of Salt Lake City, as 94.9's transmitter was located on the southern end of the market.
