= KZNS-FM =

Simulcasts KZNS, Salt Lake City
- Coalville, Utah; United States
- Broadcast area: Salt Lake City metropolitan area
- Frequency: 97.5 MHz
- Branding: KSL Sports Zone

Programming
- Format: Sports
- Affiliations: Fox Sports Radio; Las Vegas Raiders; Real Salt Lake; Salt Lake Bees; Utah Jazz; Utah Mammoth; Utah Royals FC; Utah State Aggies

Ownership
- Owner: Smith Entertainment Group; (Jazz Communications LLC)
- Operator: Bonneville International
- Sister stations: KZNS

History
- First air date: September 2005 (as KFMS)
- Former call signs: KTPM (2003–2005); KFMS (2005–2006); KOAY (2006–2008); KZZQ (2008–2011)
- Call sign meaning: "Zone"

Technical information
- Licensing authority: FCC
- Facility ID: 87974
- Class: C
- ERP: 89,000 watts horizontal
- HAAT: 647 meters (2,123 ft)
- Transmitter coordinates: 40°52′16″N 110°59′43″W
- Repeater: See § Boosters

Links
- Public license information: Public file; LMS
- Webcast: Listen live
- Website: kslsports.com

KZNS-FM (97.5 MHz, The KSL Sports Zone) is a commercial radio station licensed to Coalville, Utah, and serving the Salt Lake City metropolitan area. It airs a sports talk radio format and is owned by Jazz Communications LLC, which is a division of the Smith Entertainment Group.

Programming is simulcast on co-owned KZNS (1280 AM) in Salt Lake City. On weekdays, KZNS has local hosts discussing Salt Lake City and national sports, with Fox Sports Radio airing during nights and weekends when game action is not occurring. The two stations are the flagship radio stations for the Utah Jazz and the Utah Mammoth.

KZNS-FM's transmitter is on Humpy Peak in Uinta-Wasatch-Cache National Forest. It is a Class C radio station, with an effective radiated power (ERP) of 89,000 watts, broadcasting from a tower at 647 meters (2123 feet) in height above average terrain (HAAT). It is rebroadcast on five booster stations, all on 97.5 MHz, in and around Salt Lake City.

== History ==
=== Early years (2003–2006) ===
KZNS-FM is considered a "move in" station. On June 11, 2003, the unbuilt station was licensed as KTPM, originally located in Franklin, Idaho, close to the border between Idaho and Utah. At first, it was only a construction permit granted by the Federal Communications Commission (FCC), not actually on the air. Even before signing on, the station received FCC permission to move into the lucrative Salt Lake City radio market, from a location about 40 miles east of the city.

On August 10, 2005, the station, still not on the air, changed its call sign to KFMS. The station was sold to Three Point Media for $1.5 million, with the potential to profit from its pending move into Utah.

In September 2005, the station signed on with a mostly-syndicated talk format. The lone local host was Tom Barberi. On September 3, 2006, KFMS, now licensed to Coalville, Utah, began broadcasting from Humpy Peak. On September 5, 2006, the station became KOAY and branded itself as "The Oasis," carrying a Christian contemporary music format.

=== The Blaze (2008–2011) ===
On September 9, 2008, the station changed to active rock and became "The Blaze," with the call letters becoming KZZQ. "The Blaze" had previously been located on 94.9 with the call sign KHTB, which subsequently became the call sign for a new active rock station in Provo, called "94.9 Z-Rock" (now Top 40-formatted KENZ). Reportedly, "The Blaze" had almost been shut down, but was able to continue, using the "Blaze" moniker because its owner, Citadel Broadcasting, failed to acquire the naming rights. "The Blaze" was one of three active rock radio stations in Salt Lake City, along with "Z-Rock" and KBER.

In January 2010, due to poor ratings (possibly as a result of competition against Z-Rock), "The Blaze" changed to what it called a "Rockin' Hits" format. However, this new format was met with even poorer ratings and negative response from the station's longtime listeners. A tribute concert for the "Blaze" by local artists took place shortly after the format flip.

On December 1, 2010, morning host Roger "Big Rog" Orton spent his shift protesting the station's new format by playing active rock songs. This protest was met with positive response from listeners, and the station received many supportive phone calls, song requests, e-mails, and Facebook messages. Several Facebook fan pages showing support for The Blaze also appeared and hundred listeners signed the radio station's van, which was spray-painted white to act as a petition for the station to return to the active rock format. The Blaze returned to playing active rock shortly afterwards.

=== The Zone (2011–present) ===
In 2011, the station was acquired by the Larry H. Miller Communications Corporation. Miller owned a chain of car dealerships around Utah and the Western United States, and also owned the Utah Jazz basketball team. His goal was to own the radio stations that broadcast his team's games, running an all-sports format including shows discussing the Jazz.

On July 7, 2011, at midnight, KZZQ changed its format to sports, simulcasting KZNS (1280 AM) as "The Zone". On July 15, 2011. KZZQ changed its call letters to KZNS-FM. On May 23, 2012, KZNS-FM relaunched as "Fox Sports Radio 97.5" with programming primarily from Fox Sports Radio. In 2013, KZNS-FM resumed simulcasting KZNS, once again as "The Zone". KZNS-AM-FM air mostly local sports shows on weekdays, and carry Fox Sports Radio nights and weekends.

On April 13, 2021, it was announced that KZNS-FM and AM had been sold to Ryan Smith, who had recently purchased the Utah Jazz from the Larry H. Miller estate. On September 30, 2021, Bonneville International began to operate the stations, an agreement that also includes KSL (1160 AM) and KSL-FM (102.7) carrying simulcasts and handling situations where two games are played at the same time. In 2024, the station added the rights to the Smith-owned Utah Mammoth of the NHL for their inaugural season. Overflow situations for the UHC are also handled by the KSL stations.

== Boosters ==
Call sign	Frequency	City of license	FID	ERP (W)	HAAT	Class	FCC info
KZNS-FM3	97.5 FM	Provo, Utah	164758	1,750	−161 m (−528 ft)	D	LMS
KZNS-FM4	97.5 FM	Salt Lake City, Utah	164757	2,100	−313 m (−1,027 ft)	D	LMS
KZNS-FM5	97.5 FM	Bountiful, Utah	164756	2,200	217 m (712 ft)	D	LMS
KZNS-FM6	97.5 FM	Ogden, Utah	164755	500	28 m (92 ft)	D	LMS
KZNS-FM7	97.5 FM	North Salt Lake, Utah	189967	49 vertical	−129 m (−423 ft)	D	LMS
