= KSOP-FM =

- Salt Lake City, Utah; United States
- Broadcast area: Salt Lake City metropolitan area
- Frequency: 104.3 MHz (HD Radio)
- Branding: Z104

Programming
- Format: Country

Ownership
- Owner: KSOP, Inc.

History
- First air date: December 10, 1964
- Call sign meaning: Salt Lake, Ogden, Provo

Technical information
- Licensing authority: FCC
- Facility ID: 35629
- Class: C
- ERP: 25,000 watts
- HAAT: 1,140 meters (3,740 ft)
- Transmitter coordinates: 40°39′33.8″N 112°12′7.8″W

Links
- Public license information: Public file; LMS
- Webcast: Listen live
- Website: z104country.com

KSOP-FM (104.3 FM, "Z104") is a radio station broadcasting a country music format. Licensed to Salt Lake City, Utah, United States, the station serves the Salt Lake City metropolitan area. The station is owned by KSOP, Inc. Its studios are located along Redwood Road, and the transmitter site is atop Farnsworth Peak.

KSOP-FM also had a sister station, KSOP, on AM 1370 kHz. The FM station went on the air December 10, 1964, and has claimed to be the first FM country music station in the United States. The two stations simulcast until May 2002, when KSOP AM broke away to launch a classic country format to complement the more contemporary playlist on KSOP-FM; the AM station would close in June 2025.

On August 1, 2011, at midnight, after stunting with a countdown of 10 popular non-country pop songs, KSOP-FM rebranded as "Z104".

On November 15, 2017, at approximately 12 pm (MST) the station switched on its HD Radio transmitter, allowing for clearer radio, album art in car, and other HD options. KSOP-FM's second HD Radio channel simulcast KSOP AM; the subchannel was discontinued in June 2025, concurrently with the closure of the AM station and the move of its classic country programming to Internet radio, which later shut down in September 2026.

== Translators ==
In addition to the main station, KSOP-FM is relayed by ten additional translators to widen its broadcast area.

| Call sign | Frequency | City of license | FID | ERP (W) | Class | FCC info |
|---|---|---|---|---|---|---|
| K221AX | 92.1 FM | Laketown, UT | 56116 | 12 | D | LMS |
| K224BR | 92.7 FM | Park City, UT | 35625 | 16 | D | LMS |
| K244AO | 96.7 FM | Randolph, UT | 56114 | 12 | D | LMS |
| K244DH | 96.7 FM | Fort Douglas, Utah | 21617 | 36 | D | LMS |
| K255AD | 98.9 FM | Monroe, UT | 23184 | 10 | D | LMS |
| K274AH | 102.7 FM | Junction, UT | 52767 | 10 | D | LMS |
| K280EA | 103.9 FM | Hanksville, UT | 14179 | 5 | D | LMS |
| K292AT | 106.3 FM | Price, UT | 8739 | 157 | D | LMS |
| K296AF | 107.1 FM | Heber, UT | 70920 | 12 | D | LMS |
| K296AQ | 107.1 FM | Soda Springs, ID | 8807 | 109 | D | LMS |
