= KBER =

Radio station in Ogden–Salt Lake City, Utah

- Ogden, Utah; United States
- Broadcast area: Salt Lake City-Ogden-Provo, Utah
- Frequency: 101.1 MHz (HD Radio)
- Branding: KBER 101

Programming
- Format: Mainstream rock

Ownership
- Owner: Cumulus Media; (Radio License Holding CBC, LLC)
- Sister stations: KBEE, KENZ, KHTB, KKAT, KUBL-FM

History
- First air date: July 13, 1975 (as KDAB)
- Former call signs: KDAB (1975–1990)
- Call sign meaning: Said as "K-Bear" for the station's ursine mascot

Technical information
- Licensing authority: FCC
- Facility ID: 10779
- Class: C
- ERP: 25,000 watts
- HAAT: 1,140 meters (3,740 ft)
- Transmitter coordinates: 40°39′34″N 112°12′5″W

Links
- Public license information: Public file; LMS
- Webcast: Listen live
- Website: kber.com

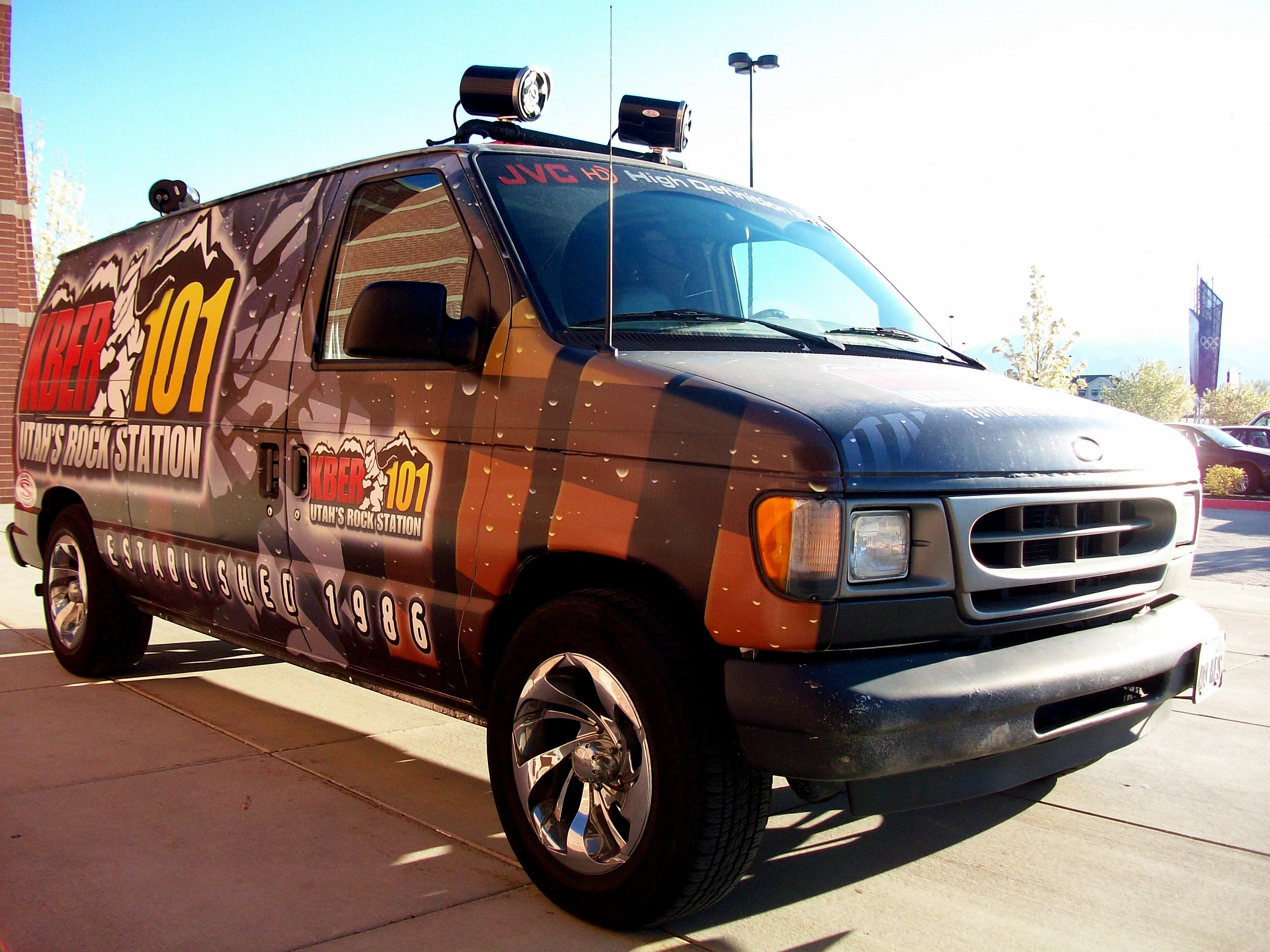
The KBER Van, used for promotions and events.

KBER (101.1 FM) is a radio station broadcasting a mainstream rock format. Licensed to Ogden, Utah, United States, the station serves the Salt Lake City metropolitan area. The station is currently owned by Cumulus Media. The station's studios are located in South Salt Lake (behind the I-15/I-80 interchange).

== History ==
Previous logo

Prior to March 1986, KBER was known as KDAB, and was licensed to Ogden (as KBER is to this day). It was known then as "B101". KBER began on 106.5, but moved to its current dial position in March 1990. It was purchased by Citadel Broadcasting during that time. It also morphed into "101 The Bear".

In 1998 the station reverted to the more familiar "KBER 101" slogan of its earlier years and is currently a top rated mainstream rock station in Salt Lake City Utah. By 2008, the station's sister station KHTB became a modern rock station, carrying mostly newer rock. KBER gradually began to change its playlist to include more classic rock songs, although it has since returned to a mainstream rock format. Later on, Mediabase & Nielsen BDS began reporting KBER on the mainstream rock panel. Citadel merged with Cumulus Media on September 16, 2011.

== Early programming ==
The station arrived as one of the leading FM radio stations in the market with on air personalities Street and Katherine, Tom Collins, Kevin Lewis, John Edwards, Mark Christiansen and Jay "J-bear" Stevens to name a few. The early to mid 1990s were the days of Mike Marble's wildly successful KBER-RAFTERS Showcase Concert Series.

The Ron & Allen Morning Show was wildly popular and they even had their own television show called "Rock Utah" which aired on local channel 30. After Ron Harrison was summarily dismissed for an on-air stunt, Allen Handy and Michael Hayes took over as "Handy & Hayes" for several months carrying on the tradition of placing within the top 1-2 stations in the 18-34 demographic within Salt Lake City's market. Darby hosted the midday show prior to Kelly Hammer taking over in 2008. Prior to Darby, the midday shift was hosted by Helen Powers, who went on to work for a number of other radio stations.

Mornings during the week on KBER previously featured the syndicated "Bob and Tom Show". The Mick and Allen Show returned to KBER in 2005. and remained until 2023.

=== Current programming ===
Along with regular shows including Helmut VonSchmidt who has been with the station for nearly 30 years, the station also does live broadcasts during business or station promotions at various events. Every year, KBER hosts an event known as "The North Pole Express" which is a take on the story The Polar Express and is an event co-hosted by the Make-A-Wish Foundation. It is held at Soldier Hollow, outside of Heber, Utah.

== Signal ==
KBER broadcasts an HD signal along with analog on 101.1 MHz. Its transmitter is located 18 miles (29 km) southwest of Salt Lake City on Farnsworth Peak. As with its sister FM stations, the station has an ERP of 25,000 watts. This, along with the characteristics and elevation of Farnsworth Peak allow KBER to be received in most of northern Utah, specifically the Wasatch Front.
