= KZNS (AM) =

- Salt Lake City, Utah; United States
- Broadcast area: Salt Lake City metropolitan area
- Frequency: 1280 kHz
- Branding: KSL Sports Zone

Programming
- Format: Sports radio
- Affiliations: Fox Sports Radio; Las Vegas Raiders; Real Salt Lake; Salt Lake Bees; Utah Mammoth; Utah Jazz; Utah Royals FC; Utah State Aggies

Ownership
- Owner: Jazz Communications LLC
- Operator: Bonneville International
- Sister stations: KZNS-FM, KSL, KSL-FM, KSFI, KRSP-FM, KSL-TV

History
- First air date: February 1945; 81 years ago
- Former call signs: KNAK (1945–1976); KWMS (1976–1982); KDYL (1982–2001)
- Call sign meaning: "Zone"

Technical information
- Licensing authority: FCC
- Facility ID: 60458
- Class: B
- Power: 50,000 watts (day); 670 watts (night)
- Transmitter coordinates: 40°51′6.8″N 111°58′9.8″W
- Repeaters: 97.5 KZNS-FM (Coalville); 102.7 KSL-FM-HD2 (Midvale)

Links
- Public license information: Public file; LMS
- Webcast: Listen live
- Website: kslsports.com

KZNS (1280 kHz, The KSL Sports Zone) is an AM commercial radio station in Salt Lake City, Utah. It airs a Sports radio format and is owned by Jazz Communications LLC. Programming is simulcast on co-owned KZNS-FM 97.5, licensed to Coalville, Utah. On weekdays, KZNS-AM-FM have local hosts discussing Salt Lake City and national sports. Nights and weekends, programming is supplied by Fox Sports Radio. KZNS-AM-FM are the flagship radio stations for the Utah Jazz basketball team, the Utah Mammoth of the NHL, the Salt Lake Bees Minor League Baseball team, Real Salt Lake of Major League Soccer, Utah Royals FC of the National Women's Soccer League, and Utah State Aggies football and men's basketball of the Mountain West Conference. When multiple games are occurring simultaneously, the AM and FM signals will air different live sports.

KZNS's transmitter is near the Jordan River in North Salt Lake, and their headquarters are located inside the Delta Center in Salt Lake City. It is a Class B radio station, running 50,000 watts by day, the maximum power for commercial AM radio stations in the U.S. At night, to protect other stations on 1280 AM, it drops power to 670 watts. It uses a directional antenna at all times.

== History ==
=== KNAK ===
The station first signed on the air in February 1945, and held the call sign KNAK. The station was owned by the Granite District Radio Broadcasting Company with studios in the Continental Bank Building on South Temple at Main Street.

KNAK first broadcast on 1400 kHz at only 250 watts. By this time, KSL was powered at 50,000 watts. KNAK was not associated with any of the big radio networks. Salt Lake City had four other radio stations, network affiliates of CBS, NBC, ABC and the Mutual Broadcasting System. In the 1950s, KNAK moved to 1280 kHz, accompanied by an increase in power to 5,000 watts by day, 500 watts at night.

=== KWMS ===
On January 16, 1976, the station's call sign was changed to KWMS. As KWMS, the station aired an all-news format. It was an affiliate of NBC Radio's "News and Information Service" (NIS), a 24-hour all-news network.

NIS was discontinued in 1977. KWMS began doing a local version of the all-news format using its own anchors and the services of the Mutual Broadcasting System.

=== KDYL ===
In 1982, the station was acquired by Simmons Family Inc., which already owned popular adult contemporary station 100.3 KSFI, for $750,000. On July 21, 1982, the station's call letters switched to KDYL. When Simmons acquired the station, the KDYL call letters were assigned to a Tooele, Utah, station, then at 990 kHz, and the owner of that station, Thomas Mathis, was compensated to release the KDYL call letters, changing the call sign of his station to KTLE. Prior to the Tooele station having the KDYL call sign, they were assigned to the 1320 kHz Salt Lake City station, now known as KNIT. Simmons wanted to call this station KDYL because those call letters had been in use for a long time in the Salt Lake City radio market.

In the early and mid 1980s, KDYL aired an all-news format. By 1986, the station had begun airing the "Music of Your Life" adult standards format, featuring big band music and adult pop songs from the 1940s, 1950s and 1960s. The station continued airing this format until June 27, 2000.

On June 27, 2000, the station switched to a talk radio format. It primarily carried conservative talk programming. Syndicated shows hosted by Michael Savage and Michael Medved appeared, along with Imus in the Morning hosted by Don Imus.

=== KZNS ===
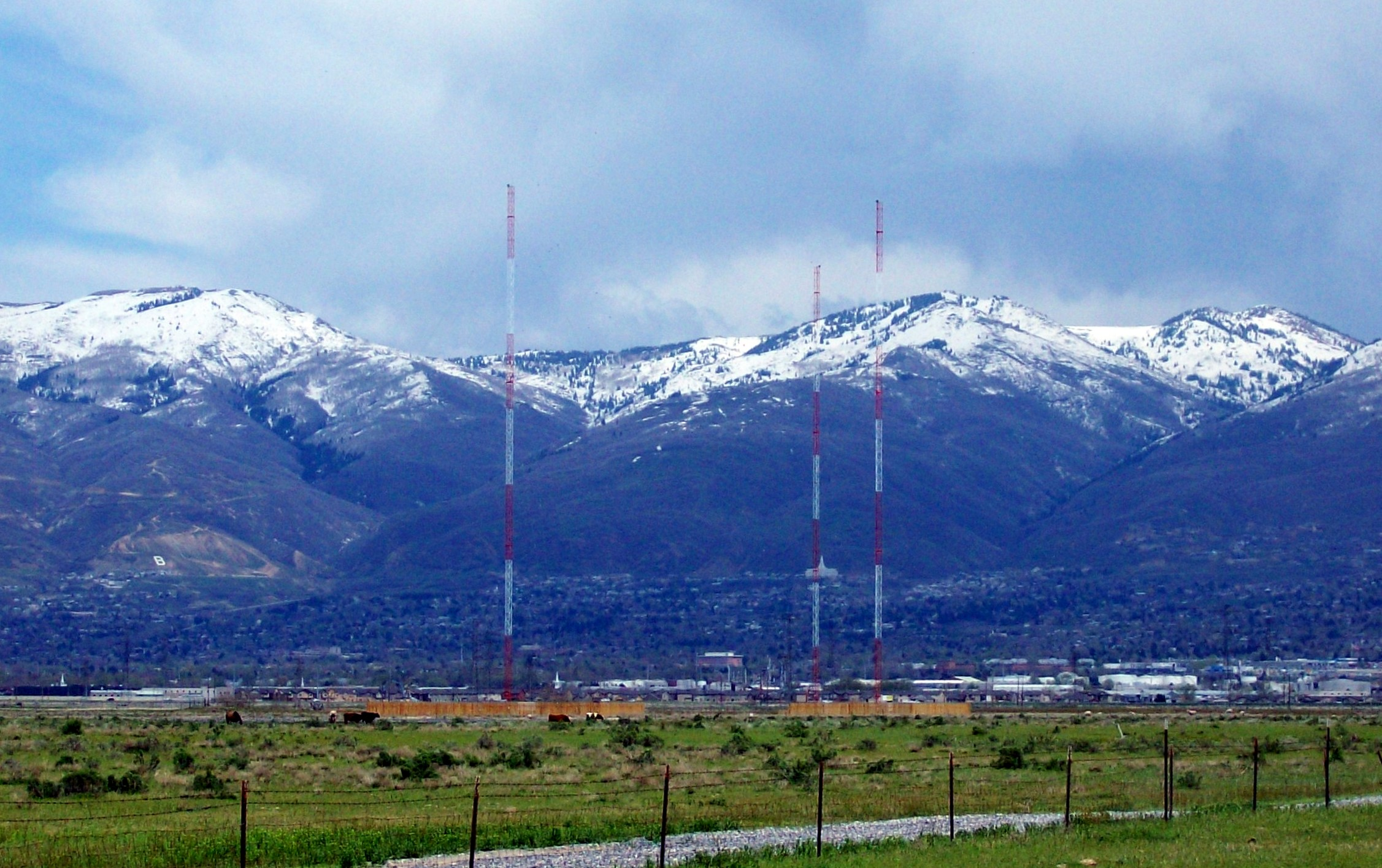
The radio towers for KZNS, north of the Salt Lake City International Airport

On November 12, 2001, KDYL's call sign was changed to KZNS. That same day, Simmons Media changed the format of the station, airing CNN Headline News in the daytime and sports talk in the afternoon and evening. The station promoted itself as "KZN", or "K-Zone"; KZN had been the original call sign for KSL. Simmons saw KZNS as the flagship of a regional "KZN" network of stations; by 2002, much of its sports programming was also carried on KZNU in St. George, KZNI in Idaho Falls, Idaho, and KZNR in Blackfoot, Idaho. Soon thereafter, sports talk programming occupied the station's entire schedule, calling itself "The Zone".

As of February 1, 2011, KZNS' "The Zone" sports talk programming also began to be heard on co-owned KZNS-FM 97.5 licensed to Coalville, Utah, a Salt Lake City suburb. Some time later, the Federal Communications Commission (FCC) allowed KZNS to increase its power to 50,000 watts by day and 670 watts at night.

As part of the change in ownership of the Utah Jazz, the sale of the station from the Larry H. Miller Group of Companies (later Miller Sports + Entertainment) to Smith Entertainment Group was finalized on May 27, 2021.

On September 30, 2021, it was announced that Bonneville International, owner of KSL and KSL-FM, would be taking over operations of The Zone sports network. The arrangement with Bonneville would result in select Utah Jazz games being aired on KSL. Founding host Gordon Monson and some producers were laid off by the new management. The Zone introduced a new lineup effective October 20.

Former logo

On September 20, 2024, KZNS was announced as the flagship radio affiliate of the NHL's Utah Mammoth beginning with the franchise's Inaugural campaign
