= Mass media in Salt Lake City =

The Salt Lake City, Utah, area includes many diverse media outlets, not only found within the official city boundaries, but also in the greater Wasatch Front urban area.

== Newspapers ==
=== Major daily ===
- Daily Herald, Provo - daily morning news
- Deseret Morning News, Salt Lake City - daily morning news
- The Herald Journal, Logan - daily morning news
- The Salt Lake Tribune, Salt Lake City - daily morning news
- Standard-Examiner, Ogden - daily morning news

=== Alternative ===
- El Semanal Magazine - free bi-weekly, family-oriented and independent media. Written entirely in Spanish.
- CATALYST Magazine - monthly environmental, spirituality, health, arts and politics magazine
- NOW Salt Lake - free monthly entertainment magazine
- QSaltLake - bi-weekly free gay and lesbian news
- Salt Lake City Weekly - weekly free alternative
- Salt Lake Free Press - free weekly alternative; news and entertainment

=== College ===
- BYU NewsNet - Brigham Young University
- The Daily Universe - Brigham Young University
- Daily Utah Chronicle - daily student paper, University of Utah
- The Globe - twice a week, Salt Lake Community College
- Hard News Cafe - Utah State University's journalism and communication department online newspaper
- Schooled Magazine - Utah Valley's student publication for BYU, UVU, and speciality college students; motto is "for the student, by the student"
- The Signpost - three times a week, Weber State University
- The Utah Statesman - award-winning campus newspaper published three times each week, produced entirely by students at Utah State University; distributed to on-campus locations and selected downtown locations every Monday, Wednesday and Friday of the academic school year
- Venceremos student newspaper - the only bilingual student newspaper in Utah
- Forum - fortnightly student paper of Westminster University (Utah)

== Magazines ==
El Semanal Magazine is a free bi-weekly independent printing media, published totally in Spanish since September 2001; news and entertainment, family oriented. www.elsemanalonline.com

- architectureUTAH magazine - annual published by Silver King Media
- CATALYST Magazine - monthly environmental, spirituality, health, arts and politics magazine
- Parent Fresh Magazine - monthly parenting magazine for discerning Utah families
- Salt Lake Magazine - bi-monthly local magazine
- Schooled Magazine - monthly local BYU & UVU magazine
- SLUG Magazine - Salt Lake Underground music magazine
- UGLY Magazine - digital tablet-based fashion, arts, and culture magazine
- Utah Homes & Garden magazine - quarterly, published by Silver King Media
- Utah Valley Magazine - bi-monthly local magazine

== Digital ==
- 24saltlake.com - news, weather, traffic and local events
- ksl.com - news, weather, traffic and local events
- utahpolicy.com - political news
- utahpoliticalcapitol.com - political news

== Aggregators ==
- UtahTweets - comprising information from Twitter streams

== Television ==
Salt Lake City is the 30th largest television market, according to Nielsen.

Channel	Callsign	Affiliation	Subchannels		Owner
Channel	Callsign	Affiliation	Channel	Programming	Owner
2	KUTV	CBS	2.2; 2.3; 2.4	MyNetworkTV (via KMYU); Comet; Charge!	Sinclair Broadcast Group
4	KTVX	ABC	4.2; 4.3; 4.4	MeTV; Rewind TV; Outlaw	Nexstar Media Group
5	KSL-TV	NBC	5.2/5.3	Cozi TV	Bonneville International
7	KUED	PBS	7.2; 7.3; 7.4	KUED World; PBS Kids; Create	University of Utah
9	KUEN	Independent	9.2; 9.3; 9.91	MHz WorldView; First Nations Experience; KUER-FM	Utah State Board of Regents
11	KBYU-TV	Religious	11.2; 11.3	BYUtv; BYUtv International	Brigham Young University
12	KMYU	MyNetworkTV	2.1	CBS (via KUTV)	Sinclair Broadcast Group
13	KSTU	Fox	13.2; 13.3; 13.4; 13.5; 13.6; 13.7	Antenna TV; Court TV; QVC2; QVC; Shop LC; Bounce TV	The E.W. Scripps Company
14	KJZZ-TV	Independent	14.3; 14.4	Dabl; TBD	Sinclair Broadcast Group
16	KUPX-TV	Independent	16.2; 16.3; 16.4; 16.5; 16.6; 16.7; 16.8; 16.9	Grit; Laff TV; Ion Television; Ion Plus; Scripps News; Jewelry Television; HSN; HSN2	The E. W. Scripps Company Multimedia Commerce Group, Inc. HSN, Inc.
19	KPDR-LD	Youtoo America	19.2; 19.3; 19.4; 19.5; 19.6	Tuff TV; Infomercials; TV Scout; Shopping; Local/Infomercials	Craig and Marilyn Caples & William Mitchell
20	KTMW	Telemundo (O&O)	20.2; 20.3; 20.4; 20.5	TeleXitos; Nosey; NBC American Crimes; Oxygen	NBCUniversal
23	KBTU-LD	Spanish Independent			Bustos Media, LLC
24	KPNZ	TCT (O&O)			Tri-State Christian Television
25	KSVN-CD	Azteca América			Azteca Broadcasting Company
26	KUCL-LD	3ABN	26.2; 26.3; 26.4; 26.5	3ABN Lation; 3ABN Radio; Radio 74; 3ABN Proclaim	Christian Life Broadcasting
30	KUCW	The CW (O&O)	30.2; 30.3; 30.4	Ion Mystery; Defy; Shop LC	Nexstar Media Group
32	KUTH-DT	Univision (O&O)	32.2; 32.3; 32.4; 32.5; 32.6	UniMás; Get; Quest; True Crime Network; Confess	TelevisaUnivision
50	KEJT-CD	Telemundo (O&O)	50.2; 50.3; 50.4; 50.5	TeleXitos; Nosey; NBC American Crimes; Oxygen	NBCUniversal

== Radio ==
Salt Lake City is the 31st largest radio market, according to Arbitron.

AM radio stations
Frequency	Call sign	Name	Format	Owner/Notes	City of license
570 AM	KNRS	Talk Radio 105.9 FM/570 AM	News/Talk	iHeartMedia	Salt Lake City, Utah
610 AM	KVNU	News Talk 610	News/Talk	Cache Valley Radio, Inc.	Logan, Utah
700 AM	KALL	ESPN 700	Sports Talk	Broadway Media	North Salt Lake, Utah
730 AM	KSVN	—	Regional Mexican	Azteca Broadcasting Company	Ogden, Utah
820 AM	KUTR	AM 820	Contemporary Christian	Julie Epperson	Salt Lake City, Utah
860 AM	KKAT	Utah's Big Talker	Talk	Cumulus Media	Salt Lake City, Utah
1010 AM	KIHU	Immaculate Heart Radio	Catholic radio	IHR Educational Broadcasting	Tooele, Utah
1060 AM	KDYL	China Radio International	Chinese	Holladay Broadcasting	South Salt Lake, Utah
1120 AM	KANN	Sounds of the Spirit	Contemporary Christian	Faith Communications Corporation	Roy, Utah
1160 AM	KSL	KSL NewsRadio	News/Talk	Bonneville International	Salt Lake City, Utah
1230 AM	KJJC	—	Silent	Kona Coast Radio, LLC	Murray, Utah
1280 AM	KZNS	The Sports Leader	Sports Talk	Simmons Media Group	Salt Lake City, Utah
1320 AM	KNIT	—	Silent	Hi-Line Radio Fellowship, Inc.	Salt Lake City, Utah
1370 AM	KSOP	Classic Country 1370	Classic Country	KSOP Inc.	South Salt Lake, Utah
1400 AM	KIXR	1400 K-Star	Adult contemporary music	Sanpete County Broadcasting Co.	Provo, Utah
1430 AM	KMES	ESNE Radio	Catholic radio	El Sembrador Ministries	Ogden, Utah
1450 AM	KEYY	—	Christian radio	Biblical Ministries Worldwide	Provo, Utah
1550 AM	KMRI	La Raza	Regional Mexican	AASAA Media, LLC	West Valley City, Utah
1600 AM	KTUB	Recuerdo 1600	Spanish Oldies music	Bustos Media	Centerville, Utah
1640 AM	KBJA	Super-Radio 1640	Spanish language talk	United Broadcasting Company	Sandy, Utah

FM radio stations
Frequency	Call sign	Name	Format	Owner/Notes	City of license
88.1 FM	KNKL	K-Love	Contemporary Christian	Educational Media Foundation	Tremonton, Utah
88.3 FM	KUUB	—	NPR affiliate	University of Utah	Salt Lake City, Utah
88.7 FM	KUAO	Air 1	Christian Worship	Educational Media Foundation	North Ogden, Utah
89.1 FM	KBYU	Classical 89	Classical music	Brigham Young University	Provo, Utah
90.1 FM	KUER	FM90	NPR affiliate	University of Utah	Salt Lake City, Utah
90.9 FM	KRCL	—	Community radio	Community-owned	Salt Lake City, Utah
91.7 FM	KUFR	—	Christian Talk	Family Radio	Salt Lake City, Utah
92.1 FM	KTCE	The Touch	Smooth Jazz	Moenkopi Communications, Inc.	Payson, Utah
92.5 FM	KUUU	U92	Rhythmic Top 40	Broadway Media	South Jordan, Utah
93.3 FM	KUBL	K-Bull	Country	Cumulus Media	Salt Lake City, Utah
93.7 FM	KKUT	93.7 The Wolf	Hot Adult Contemporary	Mid-Utah Radio	Mount Pleasant, Utah
94.1 FM	KODJ	Oldies 94.1	Oldies	iHeartMedia	Salt Lake City, Utah
94.5 FM	KVFX	VFX	CHR	Cache Valley Radio, Inc.	Logan, Utah
94.9 FM	KENZ	Power 94.9	CHR	Cumulus Media	Provo, Utah
95.5 FM	KYFO	—	Christian Talk	Bible Broadcasting Network	Ogden, Utah
96.3 FM	KXRK	X96	Alternative music	Broadway Media	Provo, Utah
96.7 FM	KUTN	Star 96.7	Hot Adult Contemporary	Sanpete County Broadcasting Co.	Levan, Utah
97.1 FM	KZHT	97.1 ZHT	CHR	iHeartMedia	Salt Lake City, Utah
97.5 FM	KZNS-FM	The Zone	Sports	Simmons Media Group	Coalville, Utah
97.9 FM	KBZN	Now 97.9	Adult Contemporary	Capital Broadcasting	Ogden, Utah
98.3 FM	KADQ	-	Classic Rock	Frandsen Media	Evanston, Wyoming
98.7 FM	KBEE	B98.7	Adult Contemporary	Cumulus Media	Salt Lake City, Utah
99.1 FM	KMGR	Classy FM	Simulcast of 107.9 FM	Millcreek Broadcasting	Nephi, Utah
99.5 FM	KJMY	My 99-5	Hot Adult Contemporary	iHeartMedia	Bountiful, Utah
100.3 FM	KSFI	FM100	Adult contemporary	Bonneville International	Salt Lake City, Utah
100.7 FM	KYMV	Rewind 100.7	Classic Hits	Broadway Media	Woodruff, UT
101.1 FM	KBER	K-Bear	Mainstream rock	Cumulus Media	Ogden, Utah
101.5 FM	KNAH	101.5 Hank FM	Classic country	Broadway Media	Oakley, Utah
101.9 FM	KHTB	ALT 101.9	Alternative Music	Cumulus Media	Orem, Utah
102.3 FM	KDUT	La Gran D	Regional Mexican	Alpha Media	Randolph, Utah
102.7 FM	KSL-FM	KSL-FM	News/Talk	Bonneville International	Midvale, Utah
103.1 FM	KLO-FM	The Wave	New wave music	Capital Broadcasting	Coalville, Utah
103.5 FM	KRSP	The Arrow	Classic Hits	Bonneville International	Salt Lake City, Utah
103.9 FM	KNYN	K-9 Country	Country	Frandsen Media	Fort Bridger, Wyoming
104.3 FM	KSOP	Z104	Country	KSOP, Inc.	Salt Lake City, Utah
104.7 FM	KNIV	La Favorita	Regional Mexican	MAV Media, LLC	Lyman, Wyoming
105.1 FM	KUDD	Mix 105.1	Hot Adult Contemporary	Broadway Media	American Fork, Utah
105.5 FM	KDWY	-	Country	Broadway Media	Oakley, Utah
105.9 FM	KNRS-FM	Talkradio 105.9	News/Talk	iHeartMedia	Centerville, Utah
106.3 FM	KBMG	Latino 106.3	Spanish CHR	Alpha Media	Evanston, Wyoming
106.7 FM	KAAZ-FM	Rock 106.7	Active Rock	iHeartMedia	Spanish Fork, Utah
107.1 FM	KEGH	La Raza	Regional Mexican	AASAA Media, LLC	Woodruff, Utah
107.5 FM	KKLV	K-Love	Contemporary Christian	Educational Media Foundation	Kaysville, Utah
107.9 FM	KUMT	The Mountain	Alternative	Park City Wireless	Randolph, Utah
