= KOVO =

Radio station in Provo, Utah

- Provo, Utah; United States
- Broadcast area: Provo, Utah
- Frequency: 960 kHz
- Branding: ESPN The Fan 960

Programming
- Format: Sports
- Network: ESPN Radio
- Affiliations: Fox Sports Radio; UVU MBB; BYU Baseball; BYU women's soccer; Utah Warriors

Ownership
- Owner: Broadway Media; (Broadway Media LS, LLC)
- Sister stations: KALL, KNAH, KUUU, KXRK, KYMV, KUDD

History
- First air date: 1939
- Former call signs: KOVO (1939–1976); KAYK (1976–1980); KDOT (1980–1985); KLZX (1985–1986); KFMY (1986–1993)
- Call sign meaning: Provo

Technical information
- Licensing authority: FCC
- Facility ID: 65665
- Class: D
- Power: 5,000 watts day 140 watts night
- Transmitter coordinates: 40°12′21.8″N 111°40′13.7″W
- Translators: 98.3 K252DI (Salt Lake City); 103.9 K280GJ (Provo)
- Repeater: 105.1 KUDD-HD2 (American Fork)

Links
- Public license information: Public file; LMS
- Webcast: Listen Live
- Website: espnthefan.com

KOVO (960 AM) is a radio station broadcasting a sports format. Licensed to Provo, Utah, United States, the station serves the Provo area. The station is currently owned by Dell Loy Hansen, through licensee Broadway Media LS, LLC. It is an affiliate for ESPN Radio, which is also the affiliate of sister station KALL.

== History ==
The station went on the air as KOVO in 1939. In April 1948 it increased its power from 250 W to 1 kW.

Radio pioneer Arch L. Madsen, who would later achieve worldwide stature as Bonneville International Corporation's visionary leader, was KOVO's first station manager. Madsen, who previously built KSUB in Cedar City, Utah, also helped form the Inter-mountain Network which joined KOVO with KALL, KLO, and KOAL.

In much of the 1960s and part of the 1970s, the station was co-owned and managed by prominent Provo citizen, Glen Shaw. The music format was Top 40 rock. Disk Jockeys included David White, Mike VanDorn, Dwayne Case, Leonard Banks, program director Randy Morrison, and others. In the fall of 1968 the youngest DJ at the station, 19 year old Rick Dewey, came on board from stations in Alabama, to attend college in Provo. With his encouragement the station purchased the industry's top jingles package, produced by PAMS in Dallas, giving the station a much-needed upgrade in sound. Along with the talented DJs that the station was procuring in the late 1960s, the station's quality was finally enhanced to the same or higher talent level as the two top rockers in Utah at the time – KNAK and KCPX in Salt Lake City, but its market share was predominantly Utah County and several counties south. Its nighttime signal occasionally reached all the way to Los Angeles, where a segment of its listeners included fellow DJs at the top rocker KHJ, as well as XERB, the “Boss Soul Power” border blaster station in Rosarito Beach, Mexico, who described themselves as fans of the station. With the advent of FM radio's rise, and with Shaw's impending retirement, in the mid-1970s the radio market changed so drastically that the station went into receivership and management changed, but the format remained the same for several years. John VanDorn took over in the mid-1970s as program director.

In 1989 Steven Grow and his brother David purchased the old KOVO radio station with hopes of real estate development. They were anxious to develop the property for the next 6–7 years and to discontinue the use of the property by a radio station. Anticipating the sale of the property, they began to arrange with the management of KOVO to remove its towers. When the property did not sell, the radio station continued to lease the property. When flooding occurred in 1983 and a dike was built, the city was careful to include all 33 acres (130,000 m^{2}) of the property in the area protected by the dike, which seemed to indicate the intent to use the property for something other than farming and grazing.

In subsequent years, housing was built to the north of the station, but the property never sold. The Marriott family through First Media Corporation owned this and a number of other major market stations during the 1980s. The FM call letters were KAYK when First Media acquired the stations in Provo. First Media divested all their radio properties in the late 1980s to Cook Inlet Region, Inc. of Alaska. On May 12, 1986, the station changed its call sign to KFMY which was maintained itself as "Family Radio" (There was no station promotion using this phrase during this time. Station staff always wondered what KFMY meant.) for the next six years. The FM station was known as K-96 and was a CHR format. The 960 AM station was known as KDOT and played an adult standards format. The FM later became KZOL a satellite automated oldies station as Cook Inlet shopped the station for sale. The FM station still owned by the Cook Inlet (not the Grow Brothers) as well as the 960 AM station, were sold to James Facer a former KJQ account executive, and promoter Jim McNeil. The station briefly simulcasted KXRK (X-96) then at 96.1 FM, then briefly "S.U.N. Student Underground Network", a format aimed at Utah Valley's college students. The station later changed frequencies to 96.3 and moved to Farnsworth Peak near Salt Lake City. Facer and McNeil sold both stations to Simmons Media in the mid-1990s for approximately $9 Million. While with Simmons media KOVO would simulcast KZNS from Salt Lake City, outside of Cougar Sports 960, BYU Baseball, and Utah Valley men's basketball.

KOVO and KBLQ (KBLQ never broadcast BYU Sports) acquired the rights for BYU Cougars baseball in 2009 and air the conference BYU Baseball games, as well as select other games.

On October 24, 2014, the sale of KOVO by Simmons Media to Dell Loy Hansen's Broadway Media LS, LLC was consummated at a price of $200,000. At that time BYU baseball games would cease on KBLQ and moved solely to KOVO. The station also moved their affiliation from NBC Sports Radio to ESPN Radio.

On May 21, 2015, KOVO expanded their sports content by acquiring BYU Cougars women's soccer games produced by IMG.

KOVO's headquarters are located at 50 West Broadway Suite #200 in Salt Lake City, Utah.

KOVO can be heard via KUDD-HD2 on 105.1 FM. It began simulcasting on two translators one on K252DI 98.3 in Salt Lake City & K280GJ 103.9 in Provo

KOVO logo used until 2024

On November 7th, 2024, KOVO expanded their programming by adding the syndicated The Herd with Colin Cowherd and Unsportsmanlike with Evan, Canty, and Michelle.
