= Humpy Peak =

Mountain in Utah, United States

- Humpy Peak in 2007.

Highest point
- Elevation: 10,875 ft (3,315 m) NAVD 88
- Prominence: 9,800 feet (2,987 m)
- Coordinates: 40°52′12″N 111°00′01″W

Geography
- Location within Utah
- Location: Summit County, Utah, U.S.
- Parent range: Uinta Mountains

Climbing
- Easiest route: Hike or private road.

A closer picture of the transmitter site on Humpy Peak in 2007.

Humpy Peak is a peak located in the Uinta Mountain Range in northern Utah. It is approximately 27.56 miles (44 km) south of Evanston, Wyoming and 21.29 miles (34 km) east of Coalville, Utah. The summit has an elevation of 10,875 feet (3,315 m).

== Telecommunications tower ==
Telecommunications and radio broadcasting occupy the mountains summit. It has a single tower near the summit that broadcasts a variety of signals to the surrounding area. The Utah Communications Agency Network (UCAN) operates a transmitter at the location. The United States Forest Service also operates a transmitter on the mountain.

== Radio stations ==
The following FM radio stations broadcast their main signals from the tower located on Humpy Peak. Three new stations have construction permits to move to the mountain. Several other FM stations may also be pending moves to the peak.

FM Radio Stations
Call sign	Frequency	Format
KZNS-FM	97.5	Sports
KYMV	100.7	Adult hits
KNAH	101.5	Classic country
KDUT	102.3	Regional Mexican
KLO-FM	103.1	Classic alternative rock
KNIV	104.7	Regional Mexican
KBMG	106.3	Spanish Contemporary
KEGH	107.1	Regional Mexican
KUMT	107.9	Talk

FM stations use Humpy Peak as a transmitter location primarily because of a terrain shadow of nearby Salt Lake City. This allows the stations to drop onto 2nd adjacent frequencies in Salt Lake City, without interfering with other stations in the main market area. All of the stations listed above use booster signals that are synchronized with the main station. These fill in the gaps that the main signal otherwise wouldn't cover well. For example, KLO-FM has six boosters to cover the Salt Lake metro area, which is behind the Wasatch Mountain Range from the main transmitter. Stations like this are generally known as "rimshots."

== Geology ==
Humpy Peak is located on the northwestern flank of the Uinta Mountain range in central Summit County. Geology of the peak is common with Uinta Mountain range as well. The peak is primarily made of quartzite, sandstone, and conglomerate. These rocks are famously dark red to purplish-red due to the presence of iron oxides (hematite) coating the grains. Humpy Peak specifically sits near exposures of the Red Pine Shale and the Mount Watson Formation. The Red Pine Shale is the uppermost unit of the group, consisting of gray to green micaceous siltstone and shale, representing a transition to marine or lacustrine environments. Some rocks on the peak date to the Neoproterozoic period (approximately 770 to 742 million years ago). Between 70 and 34 million years ago, compressional forces pushed the Precambrian core upward, creating a massive anticline (an arch-like fold). This event is responsible for the peak's height and the steep tilting of younger rocks on the mountain's flanks. In the last 23 million years, the region has undergone extensional forces, which reactivated older thrust faults as normal faults. This has slightly modified the northwestern flank where Humpy Peak is situated.

The peak is accessible via a road on private property, that begins at Utah State Route 150. The peak is 12.74 miles (21 km) from the Mirror Lake recreation site. Because of its height, and the terrain shadow the Wasatch Range provides, Humpy was likely chosen because signals from the peak cover a significant distance, well into Wyoming. This provides Evanston and surrounding communities in southwestern Wyoming with more radio stations. Stations on the peak often can be received as far northeast as Green River, Wyoming.
