= KKBE =

KKBE may refer to:

- KKBE (FM), a radio station (89.5 FM) licensed to serve Winchester, Wyoming, United States
- KBIM (AM), a radio station (910 AM) licensed to serve Roswell, New Mexico, United States, which held the call sign KKBE from 2015 to 2021
- KFYV, a radio station (105.5 FM) licensed to serve Ojai, California, United States, which held the call sign KKBE from 1997 to 2003
- KYFO-FM, a radio station (95.5 FM) licensed to serve Ogden, Utah, United States, which held the call sign KKBE-FM from 1992 to 1994
