= RFH =

RFH may refer to:

- Royal Festival Hall, London, UK
- Royal Free Hospital, London, UK
- Rumson-Fair Haven Regional High School, New Jersey, US
- Radio from Hell, a program in Salt Lake City, Utah, US
