= KYLZ =

KYLZ may refer to:

- KYLZ (FM), a radio station (101.3 FM) licensed to serve Albuquerque, New Mexico, United States
- KUQU, a radio station (93.9 FM) licensed to Enoch, Utah, United States, which held the call sign KYLZ from 2011 to 2017
- KNIV, a radio station (104.7 FM) licensed to Lyman, Wyoming, United States, which held the call sign KYLZ from 2005 to 2011
