= KYMV =

Radio station in Woodruff–Salt Lake City, Utah

Coordinates: 40°46′11″N 111°52′16″W

- Woodruff, Utah; United States
- Broadcast area: Salt Lake Valley
- Frequency: 100.7 MHz
- Branding: 100.7 & 105.5 Bob FM

Programming
- Format: Adult hits
- Affiliations: Bob FM

Ownership
- Owner: Broadway Media; (Broadway Media LS, LLC)
- Sister stations: KXRK, KNAH, KUDD, KUUU, KALL, KOVO

History
- First air date: June 2002 (as KJQN)
- Former call signs: KYBG (2000–2001); KJQN (2001–2004); KEGH (2004–2006)
- Call sign meaning: You're MOViN former format

Technical information
- Licensing authority: FCC
- Facility ID: 81867
- Class: C
- ERP: 88,000 watts
- HAAT: 647 meters
- Translator: 105.5 K288GY (Tooele)
- Repeaters: 92.5 KUUU-HD2 (South Jordan); See § Boosters

Links
- Public license information: Public file; LMS
- Webcast: Listen Live
- Website: bobfmutah.com

KYMV (100.7 FM, "100.7 Bob FM") is an adult hits formatted radio station serving the Salt Lake Valley. The Broadway Media outlet broadcasts with an ERP of 88 kW and is currently licensed to Woodruff, Utah. They also use five on-channel boosters in the area to cover the metro due to its transmitter being based on Humpy Peak, located 50 miles east of Salt Lake City. The station's studios are located in Downtown Salt Lake City.

== History ==
The station was first assigned its callsign KYBG on June 28, 2000 and was changed to KJQN on March 22, 2001, bringing back call letters historic to the Salt Lake-Ogden-Provo listening area.

=== Classic alternative (2002–2004) ===
Officially launching in June 2002, the format shifted around, starting as a 1980s and early 1990s alternative station, using the slogan "Utah's Original Alternative." The station tried to extend its reach by being on a translator in the Salt Lake Valley, at 103.1 FM. Originally, the station was covering Utah County on a translator at 100.7 FM but Federal Communications Commission (FCC) regulations caused this to cease. After a time, the station began simulcasting on 105.1 FM KNJQ. The format changed and grew into a more Triple A styled format mirroring KENZ 107.5 FM.

=== Country (2004–2006) ===
The station received a city of license change to Coalville and a new frequency of 103.1. At this time, 100.7 aired a continuous imaging loop telling northern Utah listeners to re-set their presets to 103.1 FM. 100.7 became KEGH on December 24, 2004 with a simulcast of Simmons Media's country station, KEGA.

KEGH was serving as a simulcast of KEGA-Oakley, Utah, which broadcast a Country format. But this changed on September 7, 2006, when the station moved its signal from Brigham City, Utah to Woodruff, along with an increase of power of 88 kW, thus allowing the station to cover about 80% of the metropolitan area.

The KEGH call letters moved to 106.9 FM on September 13, 2006, replacing KRAR; which is now a simulcast of KEGA covering the same area.

=== Rhythmic/top 40 (2006–2011) ===
At the start, KYMV's format was patterned after KQMV-Seattle, Washington and was one of 13 stations to adopt the "Movin'" format, alongside KQMV, KMVN-Los Angeles, WMVN-St. Louis and KFRC-FM-San Francisco. However, after three years with Rhythmic AC, KYMV switched directions to Contemporary Hit Radio on March 2, 2009, but kept the "MOViN" moniker for its new direction, and it was likely be used until the license to use it ran out. But after a year as a Top 40, KYMV returned to Rhythmic AC on June 11, 2010. Since that shift, it adopted a Rhythmic contemporary direction with emphasis on Dance-Pop tracks. As a result of this shift, KYMV was added to the Mediabase Rhythmic panel. At the same time KYMV made the shift to Rhythmic Top 40, parent company Simmons Media Group added rival Hip-Hop heavy Rhythmic outlet KUUU and Top 40/CHR KUDD to its portfolio, thus placing KYMV in the center musically.

=== '80s hits (2011–2020) ===
At midnight on August 1, 2011, MOViN shifted to an 1980s-focused hit music format but allowing for some 2000s-era songs from such acts as Beyoncé. The music is similar to what was heard on Movin' 93.9 in Los Angeles prior to Emmis' decision to lease the station to Grupo Radio Mexico, despite its surge in the Arbitron ratings as a 1980s-focused hit music station.

On September 1, 2011, KYMV rebranded as "Rewind 100.7".

=== Adult hits (2020–present) ===
On December 21, 2020, KYMV rebranded as "100.7 Bob FM".

On March 27, 2022, KYMV began simulcasting on 105.5 K288GY, and also heard on KUUU-HD2

== Boosters ==
Call sign	Frequency	City of license	FID	ERP (W)	HAAT	Class	FCC info
KYMV-FM1	100.7 FM	Provo, Utah	166363	1,750	−161 m (−528 ft)	D	LMS
KYMV-FM2	100.7 FM	Salt Lake City, Utah	166359	2,050	−161 m (−528 ft)	D	LMS
KYMV-FM3	100.7 FM	Bountiful, Utah	166357	2,150	−217 m (−712 ft)	D	LMS
KYMV-FM4	100.7 FM	Ogden, Utah	166356	425	−28 m (−92 ft)	D	LMS
KYMV-FM5	100.7 FM	North Salt Lake, Utah	166358	500	−107 m (−351 ft)	D	LMS
