= KYFO-FM =

Radio station in Salt Lake City

- Ogden, Utah; United States
- Broadcast area: Salt Lake City
- Frequency: 95.5 MHz

Programming
- Format: Conservative religious

Ownership
- Owner: Bible Broadcasting Network

History
- First air date: June 1983
- Former call signs: KVFM (1977–1983); KJQN-FM (1983–1992); KKBE-FM (1992–1994)
- Call sign meaning: YF/Ogden; the YF is common in BBN stations as a nod to the first station, WYFI

Technical information
- Licensing authority: FCC
- Facility ID: 406
- Class: C1
- ERP: 100,000 watts
- HAAT: 219 meters (719 ft)
- Transmitter coordinates: 41°14′59.2″N 112°14′14.4″W
- Translator: 91.3 K217FQ (Centerville)
- Repeater: 95.5 KYFO-FM1 (Salt Lake City)

Links
- Public license information: Public file; LMS
- Webcast: Listen live
- Website: bbn1.bbnradio.org/english/stations-list/kyfo-ogden-saltlakecity-ut-95-5/

KYFO-FM (95.5 MHz) is a radio station in Ogden, Utah, United States. The station serves Ogden and Salt Lake City with conservative Christian programming from the Bible Broadcasting Network. The primary transmitter site is located west of Ogden; a 7-watt booster for the main signal and a translator at 91.3 FM are located on Ensign Peak, improving reception in Salt Lake City itself.

== History ==
=== KVFM (1977–1983) ===
The El Paso Broadcasting Corporation was granted a construction permit to build a new 100 kW FM station in Ogden on May 16, 1977. The construction permit took the call letters KVFM. After being renamed Utah Broadcasting Corporation in 1982, the permittee signed the station on in June 1983; two months later, Utah Broadcasting sold KVFM to Sherman Greenleigh Sanchez Broadcasting of Utah, owners of KJQN (1490 AM). As a result, KVFM became KJQN-FM "KJQ", partially simulcasting its AM sister.

=== KJQN (1983–1992) ===
KJQ flipped to alternative on March 1, 1988, with many of its new airstaff refugees from the former KCGL-FM, which was flipped to religious programming when it was sold in 1986. The station also expanded its reach by broadcasting on translators at 92.7 MHz in Salt Lake City and 104.9 in Provo (activated in 1989).

Abacus Broadcasting Corporation acquired KJQN-AM-FM in 1989 for $700,000; Abacus was owned by minority shareholders from the original permittee. While the format remained unchanged, the early 1990s brought mounting troubles. In the final months of 1991, 23 of the station's 25 employees quit their jobs, after the station hired its third general manager in 14 months and rumors swirled of a format flip; staffers quit because they questioned the ownership's commitment to "modern music". Only two DJs, the hosts of the morning show, remained with KJQ; the station also lost 75 percent of its music library and some equipment, as well as several advertising clients. The former KJQ employees then brokered out time on KZOL (96.1 FM), which became KXRK on February 13, 1992. When the former employees acquired KXRK outright in 1993 for $925,000, the application included a copy of a lawsuit filed by the former KJQN-FM, alleging that its former employees took equipment, including a former milk truck used for remote broadcasts known as the "Milk Beast", when they defected, and that the ex-KJQ staffers used KJQN-owned trademarks and made defamatory remarks about their former station.

=== KKBE (1992–1994) ===
Nearly eight months after the mass defection that birthed KXRK, Abacus had seen enough. It flipped KJQN-FM to KKBE-FM "The Killer Bee", a contemporary hit radio outlet, at 5 p.m. on October 6, 1992. KKBE-FM drew many of its staff from alumni of KWCR-FM, the radio station at Weber State University. The Killer Bee, however, did not last eight months itself; in May 1993, it yielded to gospel from the Super Gospel Network, after it was rumored that the station would go country. Owner Michael Haston revealed that he had been faked out when contemporary competitor KZHT flipped to rock and then changed right back days later, leaving KKBE in a three-way format battle; furthermore, ratings were hurt when the Provo translator was out of service for three months.

=== KYFO (1994–present) ===
By the end of 1992, Abacus Broadcasting had filed for bankruptcy. The Chapter 7 bankruptcy case was resolved when KKBE-FM and KJOE (the former KJQN AM) were purchased at auction by the Bible Broadcasting Network for $455,000 in 1994; both stations flipped to BBN religious programming as KYFO FM and AM.

== Booster and translator ==
KYFO-FM operates a booster on 95.5 MHz and a translator on 91.3 MHz from Ensign Peak, which improve the signal in Salt Lake City. The translator has been associated with KYFO since the KJQ days, when it was K224BY; it moved from 92.7 MHz to 91.3 in 2006 after being forced off the air when KUUU moved to first-adjacent 92.5.

Call sign	Frequency	City of license	FID	ERP (W)	Class	FCC info
KYFO-FM1	95.5 FM	Salt Lake City	171187	7	D	LMS
K217FQ	91.3 FM	Centerville, Utah	5177	215	D	LMS

The Provo translator, K285EA, later became K284AI, simulcasting Logan-based KVFX. The move-in of Wyoming station KYLZ to the Salt Lake City market and the commissioning of a booster network forced that translator off the air in 2009.

== See also ==
- List of Salt Lake City media
