= KUDD =

Radio station in American Fork–Salt Lake City, Utah

- American Fork, Utah; United States
- Broadcast area: Salt Lake City metropolitan area
- Frequency: 105.1 MHz (HD Radio)
- Branding: Mix 105.1

Programming
- Format: Top 40 (CHR)
- Subchannels: HD2: KOVO (Sports); HD3: KUUU (Rhythmic AC)

Ownership
- Owner: Broadway Media; (Broadway Media LS, LLC)
- Sister stations: KALL, KNAH, KOVO, KUUU, KXRK, KYMV

History
- First air date: December 1978 (as KMXU)
- Former call signs: KMXU (1978–2004); KNJQ (2004–2006); KAUU (2006–2016)

Technical information
- Licensing authority: FCC
- Facility ID: 59034
- Class: C
- ERP: 21,400 watts
- HAAT: 1,243 meters (4,078 ft)

Links
- Public license information: Public file; LMS
- Webcast: Listen Live
- Website: mix1051utah.com

KUDD (105.1 FM, "Mix 105.1") is an American radio station broadcasting a Top 40 (CHR) format serving Salt Lake City and surrounding areas, that's licensed to American Fork, Utah. This station is owned by Dell Loy Hansen, through Broadway Media LS, LLC. Its studios are in Downtown Salt Lake City and its transmitter site is located southwest of the city of Farnsworth Peak in the Oquirrh Mountains.

KUDD has been granted a U.S. Federal Communications Commission construction permit to change the city of license to American Fork, Utah (from Roy, Utah), move to a new transmitter site, decrease effective radiated power (ERP) to 15,000 watts and increase height above average terrain (HAAT) to 1,243 meters.

== History ==
The station signed on the air in December 1978 with the call letters KMXU. On January 9, 2004, the station changed its call sign to KNJQ. On June 7, 2006, the station changed its call sign to KAUU.

Until October 27, 2015, 105.1 had been simulcasting sister station KEGA; on that date, the station began stunting with Christmas music as "105.1 The Gift", when it moved to Farnsworth Peak from its former transmitter site east of Hop Creek Ridge in central Utah. The station also changed its city of license from Manti, Utah to American Fork.

On December 2, 2015, Broadway announced they would donate KUDD to Community Wireless, which in turn would move KPCW-FM down from 91.9 to 91.7, with the "Mix" format moving to 105.1.

On December 27, 2015, the station shifted to dance music as just "105.1 FM" as a placeholder format until the move took place on March 31, 2016, at 10:51 a.m., with "New Romantics" by Taylor Swift as the first song after the move. The station concurrently changed its call sign to KUDD with the move.

The current morning show is Jon & Chantel, hosted by Jon Watkins and Chantel Lauren.

== HD Radio ==
KUDD broadcasts in HD Radio with three subchannels:

- KUDD-HD1 is a digital simulcast of the analog signal
- KUDD-HD2 airs KOVO Sports
- KUDD-HD3 airs KUUU Rhythmic AC
