= Roy, Utah =

City in Weber County, Utah, United States

- City
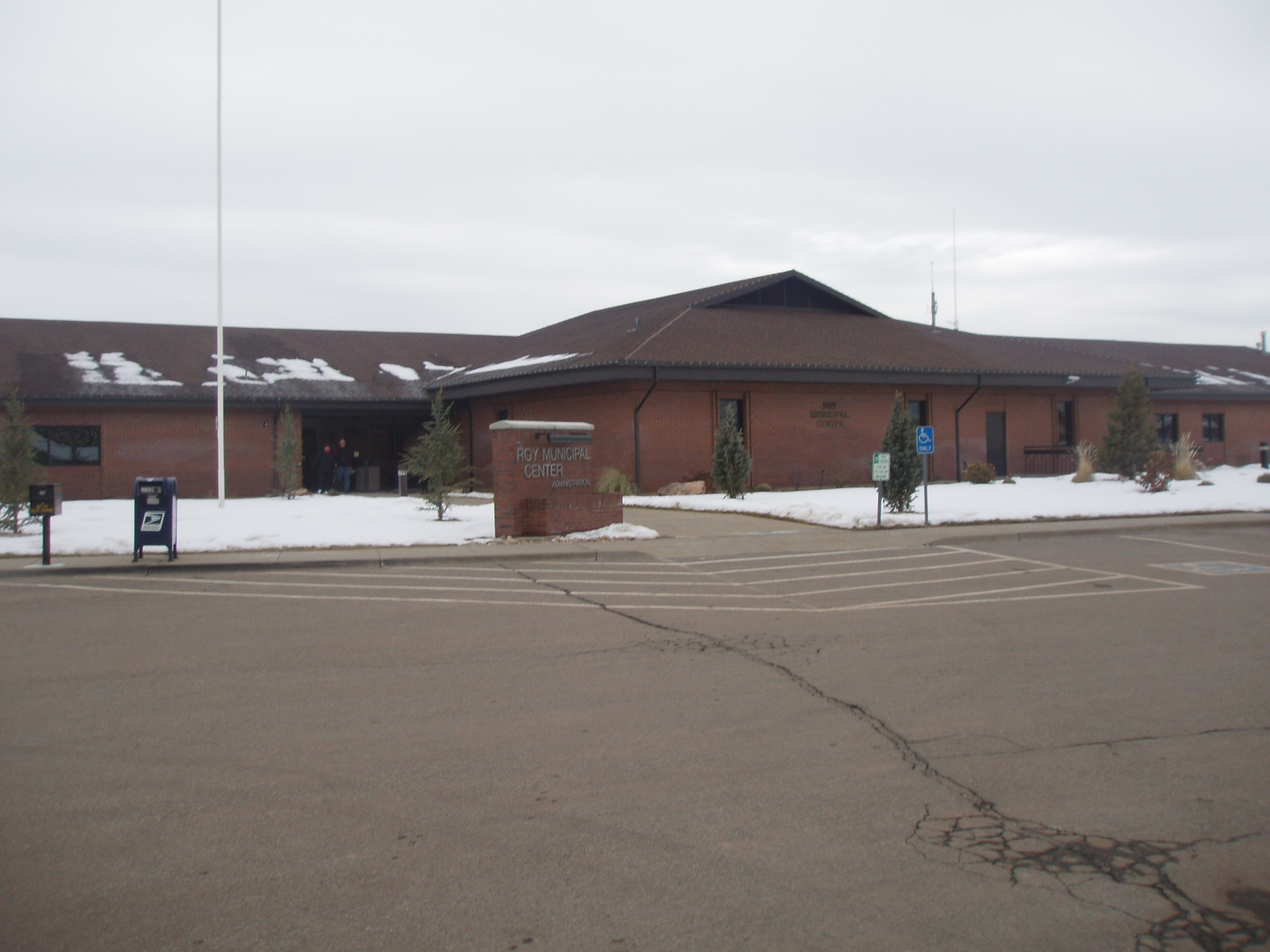
- Roy Municipal Center

- Location in Weber County and the state of Utah
- Coordinates: 41°10′17″N 112°02′55″W
- Country: United States
- State: Utah
- County: Weber
- Settled: 1873
- Incorporated: March 10, 1937
- Named for: Roy Peebles

Government
  - Type: Mayor-council government

Area
  - Total: 8.14 sq mi (21.07 km^{2})
  - Land: 8.14 sq mi (21.07 km^{2})
  - Water: 0 sq mi (0.00 km^{2})
- Elevation: 4,377 ft (1,334 m)

Population (2020)
  - Total: 39,306
  - Estimate (2023): 39,064
  - Density: 4,832/sq mi (1,865.5/km^{2})
- Time zone: UTC-7 (Mountain (MST))
  - Summer (DST): UTC-6 (MDT)
- ZIP codes: 84067, 84401
- Area codes: 385, 801
- FIPS code: 49-65110
- GNIS feature ID: 2411009
- Website: Roy City

Roy is a city in Weber County, Utah, United States, on the west side of Interstate 15. The population in 2020 was 39,306; an increase of 6.6% from 36,884 at the 2010 census. Roy is part of the Ogden-Clearfield metropolitan area, and is considered a suburb of nearby Ogden. Primarily residential and thus viewed as a bedroom community, Roy does have a small number of businesses.

== History ==
Roy was settled in 1873 by William Evans Baker, Esther Celestia Cole Baker, and their children, 25 years after the creation of nearby Ogden. Most of the communities to the east and south had already been settled. Previously known as Central City, Sandridge, the Basin, and Lakeview, Roy was ultimately named for a local schoolteacher's child, Roy C. Peebles, who had died. On May 24, 1894, a post office was established and Roy's name was made official. The City of Roy was incorporated on March 10, 1937. Joseph William Jensen was Roy's first mayor, elected by the commissioners and serving for six years.

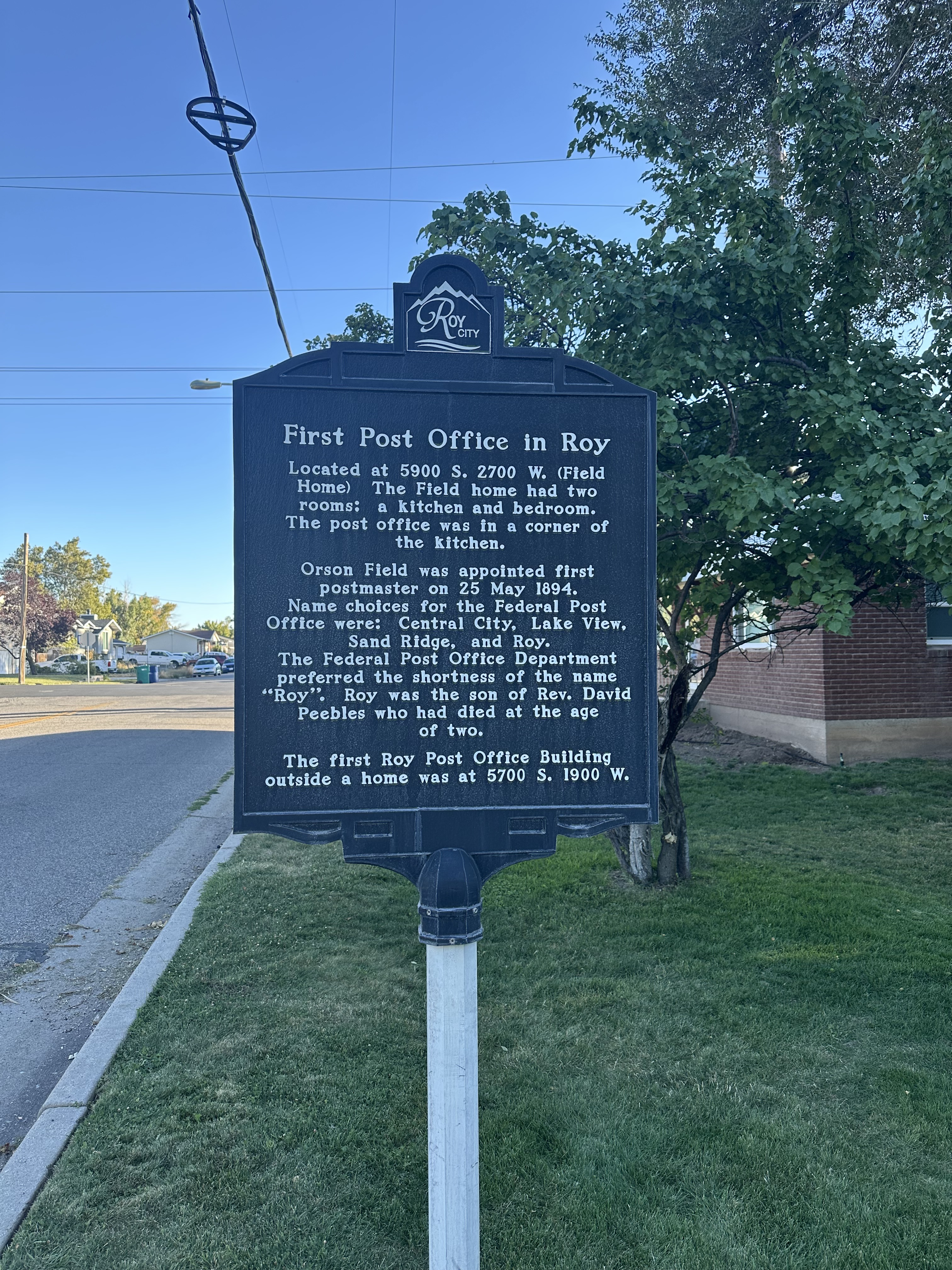
A plaque describing the nature of the first post office in Roy City, Utah.

Roy's businesses were limited until the early 1940s. A gas station, several grocery stores, a cafe, and a lumberyard made up the modest business district. But Roy developed rapidly during World War II. It housed many of the workers and personnel from adjacent military installations, including Hill Air Force Base, the Navy Supply Depot (now the Freeport Center), and the Defense Supply Depot. September 1953 marked a milestone in Roy's history—Roy received a charter to establish Utah's first branch bank. This branch of the Bank of Utah pioneered the way for other banks to establish branches in the state. Norton Parker, son of Mayor Dean Parker, was the first manager of this new branch.

Roy's population growth was extreme in the 1950s and 1960s, when most of the eastern bench was populated with entry-level homes. Starting in the 1980s, construction efforts shifted to the bottom of the hill on Roy's west side, continuing until about 2005, when new real estate shifted west and south.

== Transportation ==
The city is served by Interstate 15 via exit 338, leading to Utah State Route 97 (5600 South), one of Roy's major roads. The northern entrance of Hill Air Force Base is accessible from this exit, making Roy a common destination for those in the military.

FrontRunner has a station in Roy that opened on April 26, 2008, along with the rest of the northern segment. Two sets of train tracks bisect the city at 2700 West, being served by FrontRunner and Union Pacific Railroad.

== Activities ==
Roy offers many activities and facilities for public use.

=== Parks ===
- Roy West Park
- Emma Russell Park
- George E. Wahlen Park
- Municipal Park (adjoined with Municipal Elementary)
- Foxglen Park
- McCall Park
- Frank Tremea (Roy) Park
- Roger Phil Burnett Meadow Creek Pond
- Memorial Park

=== Recreation ===
The Roy City Recreation Complex is on Roy High's campus. It includes a swimming pool, basketball courts, a weight room, racquetball courts, and an indoor track. The Roy Aquatic Center is an outdoor swimming complex with a diving pool, children's pool and two slides.

=== Roy Days ===
Roy Days are celebrated in the first week of August. Throughout the week, the Roy West Park is used as a hub for carnival activities and concessions, with events including a car show and golf tournament, culminating on Saturday with a 5K run, parade, and fireworks show.

== Education ==
Roy is entirely encompassed by Weber School District. There are seven elementary schools, three junior highs and two high schools.

Freedom Elementary, Lakeview Elementary, Municipal Elementary, and Roy Elementary are on Roy's south side, and students are bound to Roy Junior High. Students of North Park Elementary, Valley View Elementary, and Midland Elementary attend Sand Ridge Junior High, All students, plus those from West Haven Elementary, attend Roy High School, a Region 5A high school. Needed information for the new schools of Haven Bay Elementary School, Mountain View Junior High School, and West Field High School.

=== Schools ===
School	Grades Served	City	Students	USBE Grade
Lakeview	K-6	Roy	458	Developing
Municipal	K-6	Roy	371	Developing
Roy	K-6	Roy	523	Developing
Midland	PK-6	Roy	551	Typical
North Park	K-6	Roy	542	Developing
Valley View	K-6	Roy	447	Developing
West Haven	K-6	West Haven	680	Typical
Roy	7-9	Roy	924	Developing
Sand Ridge	7-9	Roy	883	Developing
Roy	10-12	Roy	1,754	Developing

== Geography ==
Roy encompasses 7.6 square miles (19.7 square kilometers), all land. To the west is the city of Hooper, to the north is West Haven, to the east are Riverdale and Ogden, and the Davis County cities of Clinton and Sunset border Roy on its south.

=== Climate ===
Roy is in the Wasatch Front, an area that experiences variant seasonal temperatures and generally dry conditions. April or May is generally the wettest month and July the driest. Yearly temperatures usually top out at 95–99 °F (35–37 °C), and yearly minimums are around 0–15 °F (−18 – −9 °C).

Under the Köppen climate classification, Roy has a Mediterranean climate (Csa) or dry-summer continental climate (Dsa) depending on which variant of the system is used.

Climate data for Roy, Utah
Month	Jan	Feb	Mar	Apr	May	Jun	Jul	Aug	Sep	Oct	Nov	Dec	Year
Record high °F (°C)	63 (17)	68 (20)	82 (28)	87 (31)	96 (36)	103 (39)	108 (42)	104 (40)	100 (38)	95 (35)	75 (24)	64 (18)	108 (42)
Mean daily maximum °F (°C)	37 (3)	43 (6)	54 (12)	64 (18)	74 (23)	84 (29)	94 (34)	92 (33)	81 (27)	66 (19)	50 (10)	38 (3)	65 (18)
Daily mean °F (°C)	27 (−3)	32.8 (0.4)	41.2 (5.1)	50 (10)	58.9 (14.9)	67.6 (19.8)	76 (24)	73.8 (23.2)	63.9 (17.7)	52.4 (11.3)	38.9 (3.8)	30 (−1)	51 (11)
Mean daily minimum °F (°C)	19 (−7)	23 (−5)	32 (0)	38 (3)	46 (8)	54 (12)	61 (16)	59 (15)	49 (9)	39 (4)	29 (−2)	21 (−6)	39 (4)
Record low °F (°C)	−26 (−32)	−21 (−29)	4 (−16)	5 (−15)	25 (−4)	32 (0)	39 (4)	35 (2)	28 (−2)	18 (−8)	−14 (−26)	−18 (−28)	−26 (−32)
Average precipitation inches (mm)	1.78 (45)	1.68 (43)	1.84 (47)	1.88 (48)	2.06 (52)	1.32 (34)	0.58 (15)	0.74 (19)	1.37 (35)	1.85 (47)	1.67 (42)	1.65 (42)	18.42 (468)
Source: weather.com

== Demographics ==
Historical population
Census	Pop.	Note	%±
1900	183		—
1910	447		144.3%
1920	558		24.8%
1930	670		20.1%
1940	868		29.6%
1950	3,723		328.9%
1960	9,239		148.2%
1970	14,356		55.4%
1980	19,694		37.2%
1990	24,603		24.9%
2000	32,885		33.7%
2010	36,884		12.2%
2020	39,306		6.6%
2023 (est.)	39,064		−0.6%
U.S. Decennial Census

=== 2020 census ===
As of the 2020 census, Roy had a population of 39,306 and a population density of 4,823.2 people per square mile (1,862.2/km^{2}). There were 19,613 males (49.90%) and 19,693 females (50.10%), with 11,512 (29.3%) under the age of 18, 23,313 (59.3%) from 18 to 64, and 4,481 (11.4%) who were at least 65 years old. The median age was 31.8 years, and for every 100 females there were 99.6 males, with 97.8 males for every 100 females age 18 and over.

Among non-Hispanic residents, 29,052 (73.9%) were White, 416 (1.1%) were African American, 219 (0.6%) were Native American, 756 (1.9%) were Asian, 194 (0.5%) were Pacific Islander, 135 (0.3%) were from other races, and 1,698 (4.3%) were from two or more races; 6,836 (17.4%) people were Hispanic or Latino.

There were 12,944 households in Roy, of which 41.5% had children under the age of 18 living in them. Of all households, 56.3% were married couples, 15.4% were households with a male householder and no spouse or partner present, and 21.5% were households with a female householder and no spouse or partner present. About 19.0% of all households were made up of individuals and 8.5% had someone living alone who was 65 years of age or older. 10,508 (81.2%) of households were owner-occupied while 2,436 (18.8%) were renter-occupied.

There were 13,346 housing units, of which 3.0% were vacant. The homeowner vacancy rate was 0.8% and the rental vacancy rate was 6.3%.

100.0% of residents lived in urban areas, while 0.0% lived in rural areas.

Racial composition as of the 2020 census
Race	Number	Percent
White	30,744	78.2%
Black or African American	475	1.2%
American Indian and Alaska Native	410	1.0%
Asian	789	2.0%
Native Hawaiian and Other Pacific Islander	221	0.6%
Some other race	2,973	7.6%
Two or more races	3,694	9.4%
Hispanic or Latino (of any race)	6,836	17.4%

=== 2020 American Community Survey ===
According to the 2020 American Community Survey, the median income for a Roy household was $72,739 and the median family income was $77,451, with a per-capita income of $26,668. The median income for males that were full-time employees was $53,525 and for females $35,623. 7.2% of the population and 5.0% of families were below the poverty line. In terms of education attainment, out of the 24,250 people in Roy 25 years or older, 1,526 (6.3%) had not completed high school, 8,948 (36.9%) had a high school diploma or equivalency, 9,272 (38.2%) had some college or associate degree, 3,332 (13.7%) had a bachelor's degree, and 1,172 (4.8%) had a graduate or professional degree.

== Notable people ==
- Gina Barberi, radio DJ and co-host of Salt Lake City, Utah's KXRK 96.3FM "Radio from Hell" show
- Cynthia Brimhall, Playboy Playmate and actress, graduated from Roy High School in 1982
- Sabra Johnson, So You Think You Can Dance season 3 winner, resided in Roy before moving to New York City
- Jim McMahon, the quarterback who led the Chicago Bears to victory in Super Bowl XX
- Randal Quarles, former Under Secretary of the Treasury and Executive Director of the International Monetary Fund.
- Bill Schuffenhauer, three-time Olympian and silver medalist in the bobsled with the United States Olympics team
- L'Wren Scott, fashion designer and partner of Mick Jagger

== See also ==
- List of cities and towns in Utah
