= KPCW =

Public radio station in Park City, Utah

- Park City, Utah; United States
- Broadcast area: Park City, Utah; Coalville, Utah; Heber City, Utah
- Frequency: 91.7 MHz
- Branding: 91.7 KPCW

Programming
- Format: Public radio
- Affiliations: National Public Radio; Public Radio Exchange; BBC World Service

Ownership
- Owner: Community Wireless of Park City, Inc.

History
- First air date: July 2, 1980 (at 91.9)
- Former frequencies: 91.9 MHz (1980–2016)
- Call sign meaning: "Park City Wireless"

Technical information
- Licensing authority: FCC
- Facility ID: 13482
- Class: A
- ERP: 1,800 watts
- HAAT: 3 meters (10 ft)
- Transmitter coordinates: 40°40′58.8″N 111°31′22.7″W
- Translators: 88.1 K201AE (Coalville); 91.9 K220AY (Heber City)

Links
- Public license information: Public file; LMS
- Webcast: Listen live
- Website: www.kpcw.org

KPCW is a public radio station in Park City, Utah, serving Summit and Wasatch counties broadcasting at 91.7 FM, Coalville and Kamas at 88.1 FM, and the Heber Valley at 91.9 FM. In addition to local news and information, it carries national and international news from NPR, Public Radio Exchange and the BBC World Service.

KPCW is owned by Community Wireless of Park City. The programs of KPCW were also carried on KCWW (88.1 FM) in Evanston, Wyoming, until 2011. Community Wireless also formerly operated KCPW-FM 88.3 in Salt Lake City, but that station was sold to a new organization, Wasatch Public Media, in 2008. Beginning on March 20, 2009, KCPW (1010 AM) became KPCW (AM) simulcasting its FM sister. Late in August 2009 KPCW (AM) was sold to Immaculate Heart Radio, is now known as KIHU, and now broadcasts that organization's programs.

Starting in 2016, Community Wireless moved KPCW from 91.9 to 91.7 on May 23 and took ownership of the 107.9 signal that Broadway Media was donating to them after they moved KUDD's Top 40 format to 105.1, where it replaced KAUU's country format. At the same time, KUDD's sister station, KUUU, moved from 92.5 to 92.3 with expanded coverage in the Salt Lake Valley, thus requiring KPCW's frequency shift. KUMT was sold to Brigham Young University for $875,000 in April 2018, with the intent to carry their BYU Radio format. KPCW's radio transmitter is located at the peak of Quarry Mountain near Park City, Utah.

== Programs ==
KPCW provides a mix of local news and information, music, and programs from NPR, Public Radio Exchange, and the BBC World Service.

== See also ==
- List of community radio stations in the United States
