= KJJC (AM) =

- Murray, Utah; United States
- Broadcast area: Salt Lake City, Utah
- Frequency: 1230 kHz
- Branding: AM 1230 The Place

Programming
- Format: Conservative talk radio
- Affiliations: Salem Radio Network

Ownership
- Owner: Roger Lonnquist; (Northwest Capital Corporation)
- Operator: KJJC Media Group

History
- First air date: 1949
- Former call signs: KMUR (1949–1965); KMOR (1965–1977); KPRQ (1977–1983); KLAF (1983–1986); KOLC (1986); KMGR (1986–1997); KWUN (1997–2001); KJQS (2001–2015); KRUZ (2015–2017); KRRF (2017–2018); KEZF (2018–2019)

Technical information
- Licensing authority: FCC
- Facility ID: 58303
- Class: C
- Power: 1,000 watts (unlimited)
- Transmitter coordinates: 40°39′56″N 111°54′32″W

Links
- Public license information: Public file; LMS
- Webcast: Listen live
- Website: kjjc.org/radio

KJJC (1230 AM) is a radio station licensed to Murray, Utah, United States. It serves the Salt Lake City area. The station is owned by Roger Lonnquist, through licensee Northwest Capital Corporation. The station shares its tower with KNIT.

== History ==
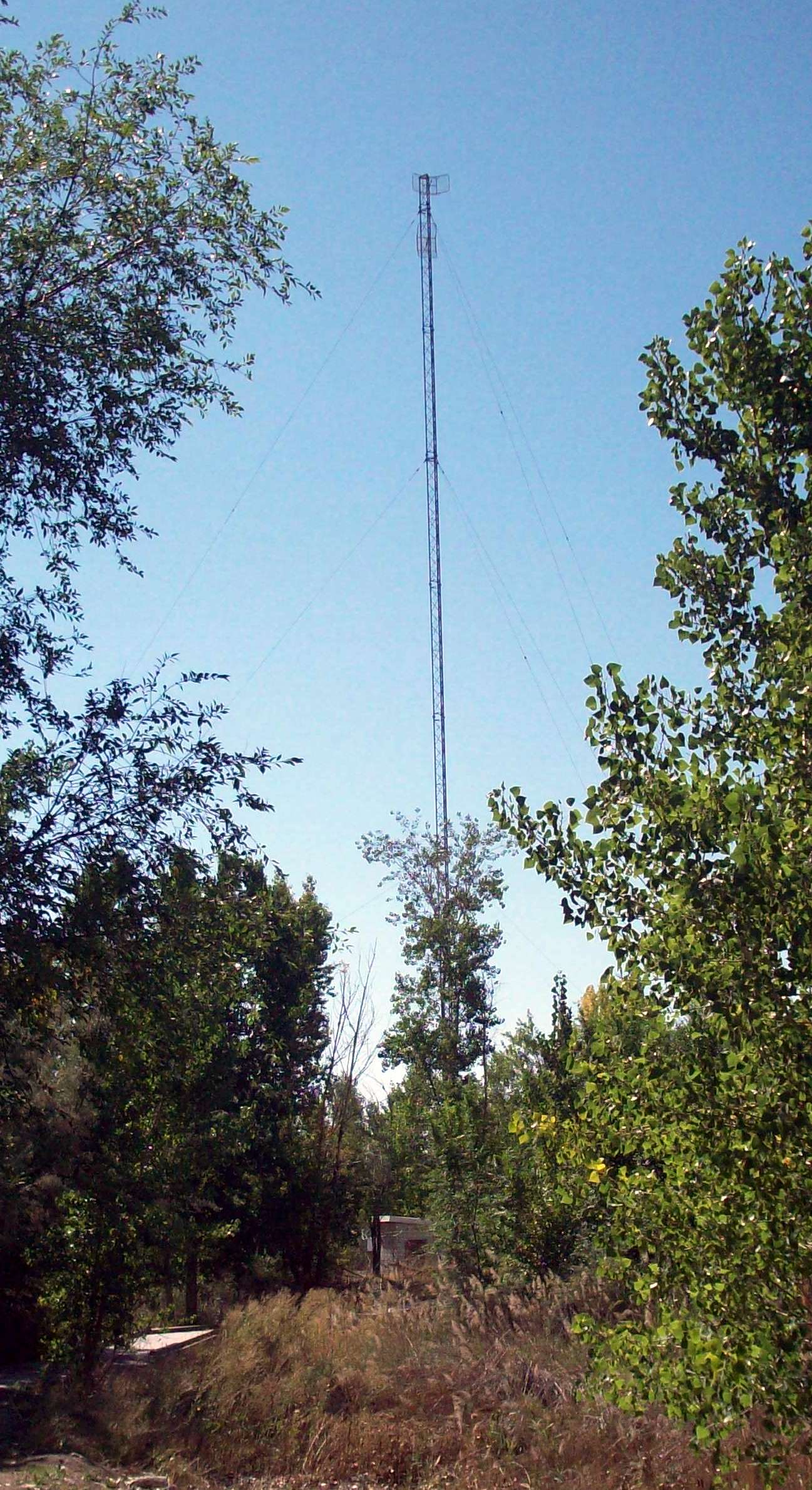
The radio tower used by then KJQS in Murray, Utah prior to the collapse in 2015

The station began as KMUR, founded by Oral J. Wilkinson. The station was first licensed by the FCC on February 2, 1949. At that time, it was a low-power, 250 watt community station airing contemporary hits. During the 1960s, the power was increased to 1,000 watts daytime, the format switched to country western and the call letters were changed to KMOR. Its studios and transmitter were originally located at 4646 South State Street, a location that also housed Wilkinson's auto dealership, Zion Motors (Chrysler-Plymouth). The studios and transmitter were later relocated to a field west of I-15 near 4900 South but were torn down later to make way for an indoor amusement park.

The station went back on the air as KLAF on June 22, 1983, carrying a comedy format. On April 15, 1986, the station changed its call sign to KOLC, airing contemporary hits again. On April 30, 1986, the station changed again to KMGR, and on July 11, 1997, to KWUN (a talk radio format station) before going dark (call sign KWUN had been used for decades in Concord, California by an AM station at 1480 kHz).

On November 1, 2001, the station returned to air, with the KJQS calls.

On January 19, 2017, Cumulus Media filed an application with the FCC to transfer the license to Pentecostal Church of God. The application was granted on March 3, 2017. The purchase price was $55,000.

On February 16, 2017, with the approval of Cumulus Media, Pentecostal Church of God filed an application with the FCC for a construction permit to move to a new transmitter site. The application was accepted for filing on February 21, 2017.

Effective October 19, 2018, Cumulus Media sold the then-KRRF to Vic Michael's Kona Coast Radio, LLC for $175,000.

On November 8, 2019, Vic Michael and Roger Lonnquist reached agreement on a deal through which Lonnquist’s Northwest Capital Corporation would purchase KJJC from Kona Coast Radio for $90,000. FCC approval came in early 2020, and the deal closed on January 23, 2020.

== Formats ==
As KMUR, the station aired mostly Top 40 hits. As KMOR, the station played contemporary country western type music. As KLAF, the station became an all-comedy formatted station. When the station became KOLC, it reverted to the previous contemporary hits. As KMGR, the station played LDS music, similar to KSFI. In 1997, the station became KWUN, which carried a talk radio format. In 2001, the station settled at its current sports format, carrying programming from ESPN Radio until 2009 when KALL 700 became the ESPN Radio affiliate and led them to switch to Fox Sports Radio. Later it simulcast the sports talk format of sister station KFNZ 1320 AM. On March 31, 2015, KJQS went silent due to a failure and collapse of the tower. On March 23, 2016, KRUZ returned to the air with sports. On November 30, 2015, its calls were changed to KRUZ. On February 17, 2017, KRUZ changed their call letters to KRRF. The station was operating at reduced power via a special temporary authority (STA) from the FCC, with a temporary tower located near the studios on Bearcat Drive.

On November 4, 2018, the station changed its call sign to KEZF, and then to KJJC on May 20, 2019. On June 1, 2019, KJJC Media Group took over operation of the station, and flipped it from sports to a conservative talk format using Salem Radio Network programming. KJJC Media Group also operates a group of television stations in Montana, led by KJJC-TV in Great Falls, that air MeTV and Christian programming. The transmitter in Murray is diplexed with KNIT.
