= KEGH =

Radio station in Woodruff–Salt Lake City, Utah

- Woodruff, Utah; United States
- Broadcast area: Salt Lake City metropolitan area
- Frequency: 107.1 MHz
- Branding: La Ley 107.1

Programming
- Format: Spanish AC

Ownership
- Owner: Scot Matthews; (Aero Star Communications, LLC)
- Sister stations: KNIV

History
- First air date: 1972 (as KBUH-FM)
- Former call signs: KBUH-FM (1972–1984); KFRZ-FM (1984–1985); KSOS (1985–1995); KLZX-FM (1995–1998); KUUU (1998–1998); KRAR (1998–2006)
- Former frequencies: 107.1 MHz (1972–1986); 106.9 MHz (1986–2014)
- Call sign meaning: "Eagle" (former format)

Technical information
- Licensing authority: FCC
- Facility ID: 21607
- Class: C
- ERP: 89,000 watts
- HAAT: 647 meters
- Transmitter coordinates: 40°52′16″N 110°59′43″W
- Repeater: See § Boosters

Links
- Public license information: Public file; LMS
- Webcast: Listen Live
- Website: laley107.com

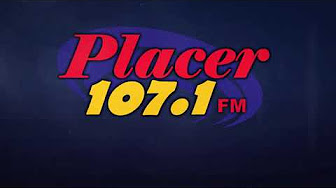

KEGH (107.1 FM) is an American radio station broadcasting a Spanish adult contemporary format. It is licensed to Woodruff, Utah, United States, and owned by Michael V. Call, through licensee Aerostar Communications, LLC. In February 2009, KEGH was a simulcast of KEGA, The Eagle 101.5, according to the Simmons Media corporate web site.

KEGH has been granted a U.S. Federal Communications Commission construction permit to change the city of license to Woodruff, move to a new transmitter site, move to 107.1 MHz, increase ERP to 89,000 watts and decrease HAAT to 647 meters. This was completed on December 8, 2014, just before switching from the KEGA simulcast to the KALL simulcast. On July 13, 2015, KEGH switched from the KALL simulcast to regional Mexican, branded as "La Raza". On 2016 "La Raza" didn't have the right requirements and it was taken by Broadway Media Llc.

Broadway Media sold the station to MAV Media Llc. KEGH Is now "Placer 107.1FM"

== History ==
The station began operations in 1972 on 107.1 as a class-A in Brigham City as KBUH-FM which calls it had until they obtained a construction permit to upgrade to a Class C station on 106.9 which was completed in around mid-1984. The station was assigned the callsign KFRZ-FM on September 9, 1984. On October 1, 1985, the station changed its call sign to KSOS and on June 26, 1995, to KLZX-FM. On March 13, 1998, the station became KUUU, and on May 1, 1998, KRAR. Finally on September 13, 2006, the station became KEGH. In 2014, the station moved from 106.9, back to 107.1.

In April 2017 KEGH dropped the "La Raza" simulcast and went silent. In August 2017 KEGH returned to the air with Spanish adult contemporary, branded as "Placer 107.1".

In December 2020, The station rebranded as "La Ley 107.1" while keeping the Spanish Adult Contemporary format.

== Boosters ==
Call sign	Frequency	City of license	FID	ERP (W)	HAAT	Class	FCC info
KEGH-FM1	107.1 FM	Ogden, Utah	197795	500	28 m (92 ft)	D	LMS
KEGH-FM2	107.1 FM	Bountiful, Utah	197794	2,200	217 m (712 ft)	D	LMS
KEGH-FM3	107.1 FM	Salt Lake City, Utah	197793	2,100	313 m (1,027 ft)	D	LMS
KEGH-FM4	107.1 FM	Provo, Utah	197792	1,750	−161 m (−528 ft)	D	LMS
