= KLO-FM =

Radio station in Coalville–Salt Lake City, Utah

- Coalville, Utah; United States
- Broadcast area: Salt Lake City metropolitan area
- Frequency: 103.1 MHz
- Branding: Coast 103

Programming
- Format: Soft adult contemporary
- Affiliations: Weber State Wildcats Learfield

Ownership
- Owner: Capital Broadcasting; (KLO Broadcasting Co.)
- Sister stations: KBZN

History
- First air date: 2004
- Former call signs: KPEB (2001–2004); KJQN (2004–2012); KLO-FM (2012–2014); KSQN (2014–2020)

Technical information
- Licensing authority: FCC
- Facility ID: 88483
- Class: C
- ERP: 89,000 watts
- HAAT: 647 meters (2,123 ft)
- Transmitter coordinates: 40°52′16″N 110°59′43″W
- Repeater: See § Boosters

Links
- Public license information: Public file; LMS
- Webcast: Listen Live
- Website: coast103.com

KLO-FM (103.1 FM) is a commercial radio station licensed to Coalville, Utah, and serving the Salt Lake City metropolitan area. Owned by Capital Broadcasting, It broadcasts a Soft AC format. The station is the radio home for Weber State University sporting events.

Its studios are located at the 257 Tower in Downtown Salt Lake City. KLO-FM has an effective radiated power (ERP) of 89,000 watts. (The maximum for most FM stations is 100,000 watts.) The transmitter is atop Humpy Peak, about 21 miles (34 km) east of Coalville. It also operates several booster stations on 103.1 MHz around Northern Utah.

== History ==
=== Modern rock (1983–1992) ===
This station began in 1983, licensed to Ogden, Utah, and broadcasting on 95.5 FM. KJQN's Modern rock format was also simulcast on a 1,000-watt AM station on 1490 kHz, which would later become KOGN.

In the late 1980s, KJQN was purchased by Abacus Communications. Abacus decided to make major changes in personnel in 1991. Management fired program director Mike Summers and engineered a deal to take over another station, then-top 40 KZOL of Provo, Utah. Re-dubbed "X96" in February 1992, KXRK raided much of KJQ's talent. For a time, the stations competed. However, as KJQ's ratings eroded and modern rock promoters split their business, management decided to switch formats.

=== Top 40/CHR (1992–2001) ===
In early October 1992, KJQN-FM flipped to Top 40 hits, adopting the letters KKBE.

=== Classic alternative (2002–2005) ===
In 2001, Simmons purchased stations in Brigham City and Oakley, and acquired the historic call letters. The "classic modern rock" format adopted by Simmons was meant to evoke music played on the original KJQ and the early music video days of MTV. The Chet and Brad morning show featured Chet "The Pinhead" Tapp and Cuzzin Brad of the original KJQ, and the station adopted some of the original KJQ's promotions including the old "Bessie" milk truck. Management went through several program directors including Ian McCain (from KCPX), Dom Casual (from KENZ and veteran of the original KJQ), Lara Jones (a veteran of the original KJQ), interim PD Todd Noker (also PD at sister station KXRK), Music Director Jon Smith (also from KENZ).

=== Adult hits (2005–2012) ===
On January 21, 2005, at noon, the station flipped to the adult hits format known as Jack FM. Since the nationally syndicated Jack-FM format doesn't use disc jockeys, the air staff was laid off without advance notice. Management stated the audience "wasn't growing as fast as we wanted."

Frank Bell and Randy Rose programmed KJQN after the station flipped to Jack FM. It stayed with adult hits for more than seven years.

=== Talk (2012–2014) ===
On June 29, 2012, the station announced that KJQN would drop the "Jack FM" format on July 16, 2012. It would begin simulcasting the talk radio format of KLO 1430 AM. The FM station switched its call sign to KLO-FM. The change took place at Midnight on that date. The last songs on Jack FM were "Wild Wild Life" by Talking Heads and the first few seconds of "Janie's Got a Gun" by Aerosmith, which was abruptly cut off by the start of the simulcast.

=== Adult contemporary (2014–2016) ===
On March 26, 2014, 103.1 changed its call letters to KSQN, sparking rumors of a format change in the following months. On June 5, 2014, KSQN dropped its talk simulcast with KLO. It began playing adult contemporary music, branded as "Sunny 103."

=== Classic alternative (2016–2025) ===
On September 30, 2016, Capitol Broadcasting announced that KSQN would flip to 80s hits as "103.1 The Wave" the following Monday, October 3. Promoting itself as "The Next Wave of New Wave", the format featured alternative rock and new wave music from the 1980s. Brad and Chet also returned to the station, hosting mornings and middays respectively.

The KLO-FM call sign returned on November 3, 2020. The change followed Capital Broadcasting's sale of KLO 1430 AM to El Sembrador Ministries, a transaction that did not include the KLO call sign. This change also saw Weber State Wildcats football and basketball move from 1430 AM to 103.1 FM. The AM station became KMES.

In July 2025, the station dropped its airstaff; by then, KLO-FM held only a 0.9 share of the market in the Nielsen Audio ratings. On October 7, 2025, the station dropped its alternative format and began stunting with Christmas music as Christmas 103, marking the first station to flip to Christmas music for the 2025 season.

=== Coast 103.1 ===
On December 29, 2025, at midnight, KLO-FM flipped to soft adult contemporary, branded as "Coast 103". The first song on "Coast" was "Memories" by Maroon 5.

On September 28, 2026, KLO-FM flipped to Christmas music, once again becoming the first radio station in North America to do so for the 2026 Christmas season. The station's on-air branding changed to "Christmas 103 on Coast 103.1" the same day. It is also the first time since 2020 that a station has flipped to Christmas music in September (the other being WWIZ, who flipped on September 25, 2020). However, contrary to 2025, KLO-FM is not expected to switch formats after the 2026 Christmas season. Station management cited the success of the 2025 stunt (in which it had siphoned three ratings points off of market leader KSFI) and tight competition in the Salt Lake metropolitan area as reasons for the unusual programming move. Salt Lake had a prior history of early adoption of Christmas music, as KOSY (on the now-vacant 106.5 frequency) had previously pioneered the practice of flipping to the format in October two decades prior.

== Boosters ==
Call sign	Frequency	City of license	FID	ERP (W)	HAAT	Class	FCC info
KLO-FM2	103.1 FM	Ogden, Utah	161878	500	28 m (92 ft)	D	LMS
KLO-FM4	103.1 FM	Salt Lake City, Utah	161875	2,100	313 m (1,027 ft)	D	LMS
KLO-FM6	103.1 FM	Provo, Utah	161874	1,750	−161 m (−528 ft)	D	LMS
KLO-FM7	103.1 FM	No. Salt Lake, Utah	165021	500	−98 m (−322 ft)	D	LMS
KLO-FM8	103.1 FM	Park City, Utah	161876	3,000	832 m (2,730 ft)	D	LMS
KLO-FM9	103.1 FM	Bountiful, Utah	161877	2,500	217 m (712 ft)	D	LMS

== See also ==
- List of Salt Lake City media
- List of three-letter broadcast call signs in the United States
