= Quarry Mountain =

Mountain in Summit County, Utah

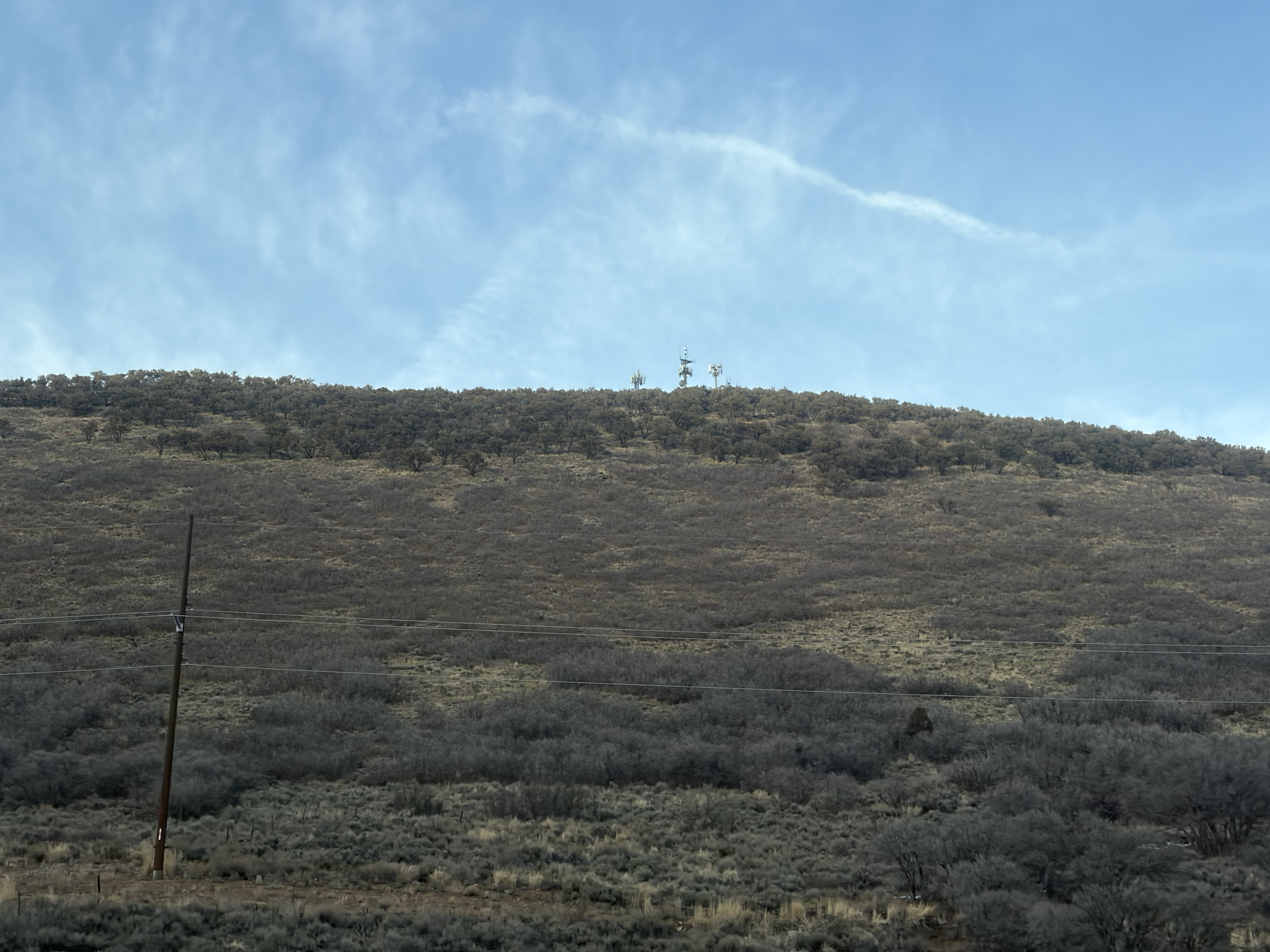

Highest point
- Elevation: 7,418 ft (2,261 m)
- Prominence: 694 ft (212 m)
- Isolation: 0.96 miles
- Coordinates: 40°40′58.8″N 111°31′22.7″W

Geography
- Location: Summit County, Utah

Quarry Mountain is a 7418-foot (2261 m) mountain near Park City, Utah, United States located in the Wasatch Range.

== Description ==
Quarry Mountain is adjacent to Utah State Route 224 and is located in the Wasatch Range. Due to its large geographic isolation at 694 feet (212 meters), Quarry Mountain's peak is adorned with cell towers and radio transmitters from KPCW, a local radio station. Quarry Mountain is also located in the Weber River drainage basin. The mountain can be accessed via a 2 mile (3.2 km) hiking trail, and a round trip hike usually takes around 1-2 hours.
