= KNAH =

Radio station in Oakley–Salt Lake City, Utah

- Oakley, Utah; United States
- Broadcast area: Salt Lake City metropolitan area
- Frequency: 101.5 MHz
- Branding: 101.5 Hank FM

Programming
- Format: Country music

Ownership
- Owner: Broadway Media; (Broadway Media LS, LLC)
- Sister stations: KXRK; KYMV; KUDD; KALL; KOVO; KUUU

History
- First air date: June 28, 2000
- Former call signs: KPKK (2000–2003); KKIK (2003); KEGA (2003–2023)
- Call sign meaning: Hank

Technical information
- Licensing authority: FCC
- Facility ID: 89255
- Class: C
- ERP: 89,000 watts
- HAAT: 647 meters (2,123 ft)
- Transmitter coordinates: 40°52′16″N 110°59′43″W
- Translators: 92.5 KUUU-HD3 (South Jordan) (104.7 K284AY) Tooele, Utah
- Repeater: See § Repeaters

Links
- Public license information: Public file; LMS
- Webcast: Listen live
- Website: hankfmutah.com

KNAH (101.5 FM, "101.5 Hank FM") is a commercial radio station licensed to Oakley, Utah, United States, and serving the Salt Lake City metropolitan area. It is owned by Broadway Media and features a gold-based country music format. Its studios are on West Broadway (300 South) in Downtown Salt Lake City.

The transmitter tower is atop Humpy Peak, 50 miles east of Salt Lake City. KNAH also has multiple booster stations to help improve its signal.

== History ==
The station signed on the air on June 28, 2000. Its original call sign was KPKK, known as "The Peak."

Former logo

On July 3, 2003, the station changed its call sign to KKIK. On July 30, 2003, the station became KEGA.

On November 10, 2023, at noon, KEGA flipped to Christmas country music. It also applied to change its call sign to KNAH.

On December 26, 2023, at midnight, KEGA rebranded as "101.5 Hank FM" and changed its call sign to KNAH. The first song on "Hank FM" was "The Thunder Rolls" by Garth Brooks.

For listeners with an HD Radio, KNAH can be heard via KUUU-HD3 at 92.5 FM.

== Air staff ==
Current DJ Lineup:

Pat "The Outlaw" Garrett: 12:00 PM–6:00 PM

Past air talent includes Jon Watkins, Chantel Lauren, Justin Taylor, Keith Stubbs, Amanda Jones, Tracy Chapman, Cody Alan, and Carly Cash.

== Repeaters ==
Broadcast translators for KNAH
Call sign	Frequency	City of license	FID	ERP (W)	HAAT	FCC info
KNAH-FM1	101.5 FM	Ogden, Utah	137268	500	10 m (33 ft)	LMS
KNAH-FM3	101.5 FM	Salt Lake City, Utah	137538	2100	267 m (876 ft)	LMS
KNAH-FM5	101.5 FM	Provo, Utah	137741	1750	−186 m (−610 ft)	LMS
KNAH-FM6	101.5 FM	Bountiful, Utah	137910	1200	202 m (663 ft)	LMS
KNAH-FM7	101.5 FM	Park City, Utah	161762	3000	809 m (2,654 ft)	LMS
KNAH-FM10	101.5 FM	North Salt Lake, Utah	165020	500	−1,506 m (−4,941 ft)	LMS
