= Schooled (magazine) =

Student magazine in Provo, Utah from 2003 to 2010

- Format: digital
- Founded: 2003
- First issue: September 3, 2003; 22 years ago
- Final issue Number: Spring 2010; Vol. 7 Issue 2
- Country: United States
- Based in: Provo, Utah
- Language: English
- Website: schooledmagazine.com

Schooled magazine was a monthly magazine based in Provo, Utah, United States and was in publication from September 3, 2003, to 2010. The magazine is owned and managed by Russ Taylor, who acquired the title in October 2004.

Schooled, with the motto "for the student, by the student", was written for and by students and focuses on college student life. It targeted students at Brigham Young University and Utah Valley State College.

The magazine's official website indicates that the last issue published was in Spring 2010.
