= CATALYST Magazine =

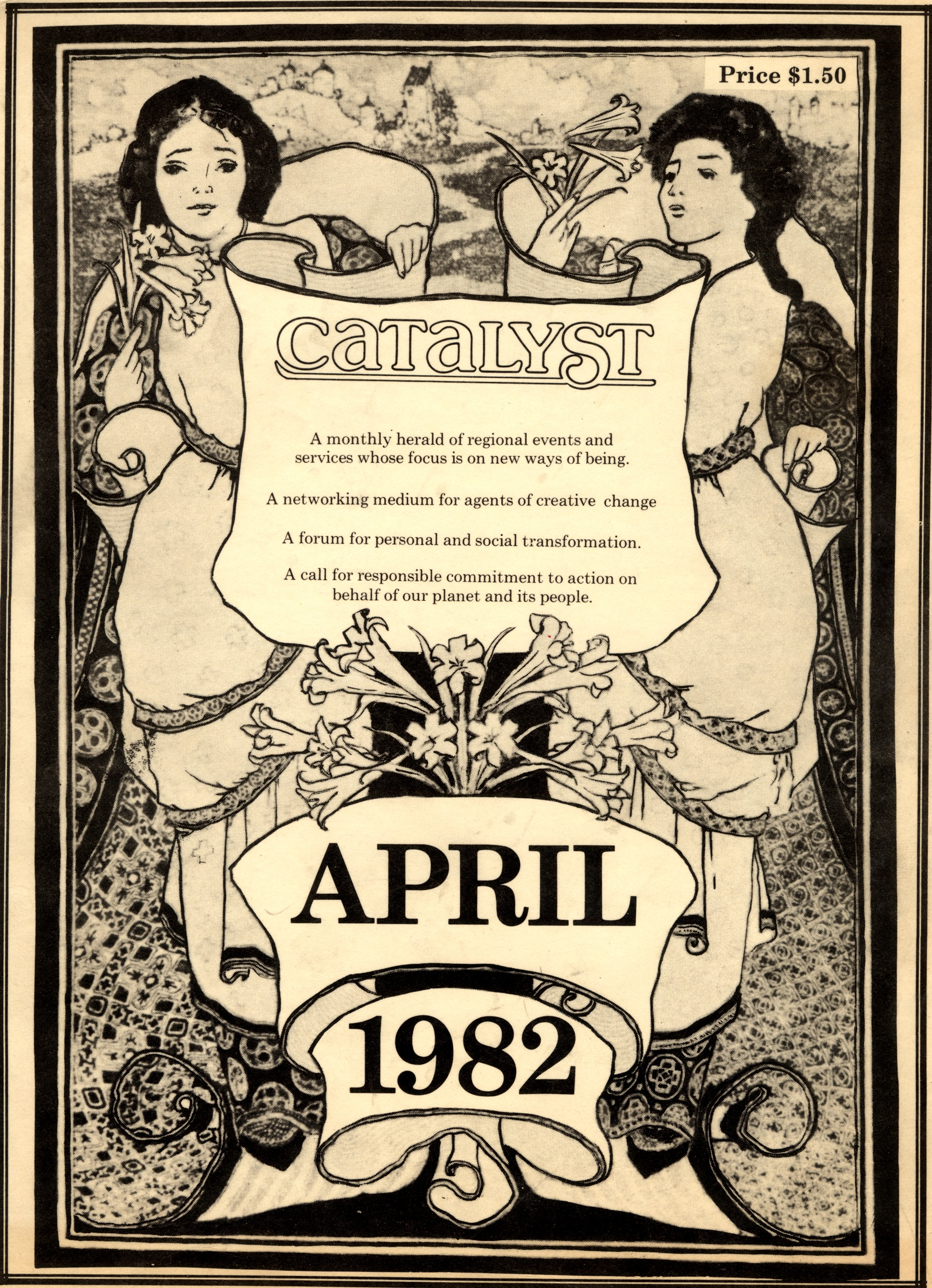
- CATALYST Magazine's first cover
- Editor: Greta Belanger deJong
- Categories: Lifestyle magazine
- Frequency: Monthly
- Circulation: 25,000
- Publisher: Greta Belanger deJong
- Founded: 1982; 43 years ago
- Company: Common Good Press
- Country: USA
- Based in: Salt Lake City, UT
- Language: English
- Website: www.catalystmagazine.net

CATALYST Magazine is a free alternative monthly tabloid-paged magazine published in Salt Lake City, Utah. It was founded in 1982 by Greta Belanger deJong, Victoria Fugit, Lezlee Spilsbury, Don Ashton and Lucy Powell.

The magazine organizes annual Clean Air Solutions Fair.
