= Dell Loy Hansen =

American businessman and philanthropist

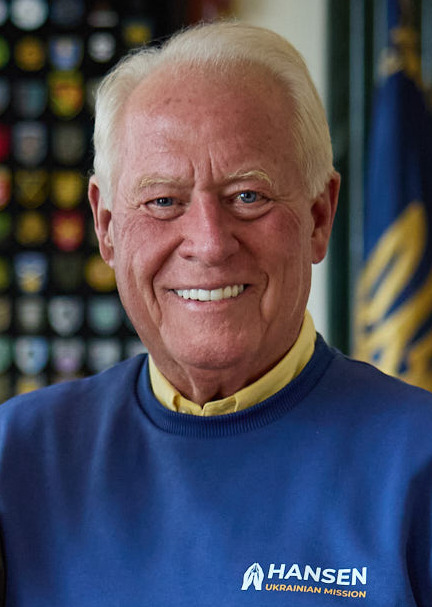
- Hansen in 2024
- Born: 1951 or 1952 (age 74–75); Salina, Utah, U.S.
- Known for: Ownership of The Wasatch Group

Dell Loy Hansen is an American businessman, philanthropist, and coin collector. He is founder and CEO of the Wasatch Group, a real estate investment firm, and was the owner of Real Salt Lake of Major League Soccer until a sale in 2020 amid controversy. Hansen's nonprofit foundation has been recognized for their work in addressing the Ukrainian refugee crisis after the Russian invasion of Ukraine.

== Career ==
Hansen was born in Salina, Utah, and raised in Cache Valley. His father Delbert was a U.S. Navy veteran of World War II who later worked for the Soil Conservation Service, and his mother was a school teacher. He graduated from the Jon M. Huntsman School of Business at Utah State University in 1982 with a Bachelor of Science in political science.

Hansen started a homebuilding business that closed during a savings and loan crisis in 1988. The business constructed 1,200 modular homes and marketed other properties. Hansen founded the Wasatch Group in 1988, taking over government-seized real estate from the Resolution Trust Corporation for resale. The company later expanded into commercial office development and management, including the ownership of high-rise buildings in the Salt Lake City area. By 2002, Hansen was involved in 17 different venture capital firms. Hansen also acquired a large parcel in Bellevue, Washington, that was developed into Washington Square in the 2000s.

As of 2013, the Wasatch Group manages 65 properties in the Western United States, worth an estimated $1.3 billion, and employs 500 people. Hansen also owns Broadway Media, which manages several radio stations in Utah.

== Sports ownership ==
Hansen bought a minority stake in the ownership of Major League Soccer franchise Real Salt Lake in 2009 from Dave Checketts. His involvement with the club began with a political fundraiser at Rio Tinto Stadium during a U.S. men's national team match, his second time watching live soccer, where Checketts had pitched the stake to former Disney CEO Michael Eisner before Hansen negotiated his share. Hansen's stake, originally 49 percent of the club, was increased to 62 percent in late 2012. Checketts sold his majority stake in the team to Hansen in 2013, giving him full control of the club, Rio Tinto Stadium, and sports radio station KALL.

Under Hansen's ownership through Utah Soccer LLC, Real Salt Lake launched a reserve team, Real Monarchs, that began play in 2015. The team was moved to a new venue, Zions Bank Stadium, on the grounds of a soccer academy in Herriman, Utah, that was partially funded by Hansen and opened in 2018. Hansen also negotiated a tax break with the Sandy city government for Rio Tinto Stadium, which was protested by city leaders in 2017. RSL also launched a women's team, Utah Royals FC of the National Women's Soccer League, that began play in 2018. Hansen had approached Merritt Paulson of the Portland Timbers and Portland Thorns about a franchise in the women's league four years earlier and bought the rights to defunct franchise FC Kansas City.

=== Controversy and end of ownership ===
Following a multi-sport player strike that caused the postponement of MLS matches on August 27, 2020, Hansen expressed his disappointment in an interview with radio station KXRK, also threatening to cease funding the club due to players not playing to show support for Black Lives Matter and to protest the shooting of Jacob Blake. The comments were criticized by prominent MLS and NBA players, which caused him to later retract his comments in an interview with ESPN700 and issue an apology. An article published later that day in The Athletic reported a history of alleged racist comments made by Hansen about or in the presence of Black employees at the Wasatch Group and in the RSL organization. Further allegations were also published in The Salt Lake Tribune, including Hansen's mimicking of Black employee's accents, triggering investigations from MLS and NWSL. On August 30, 2020, MLS and NWSL announced that Hansen would explore selling Real Salt Lake, Real Monarchs, and the Utah Royals. In December 2020, Utah Soccer LLC announced that the Royals would move to Kansas City while a new franchise in Utah would be re-established in 2023.

== Philanthropy ==
As of 2023, the Dell Loy Hansen Family Foundation has contributed $160 million towards education, healthcare, arts, and other causes in Utah. since the 2022 Russian invasion of Ukraine, the foundation has contributed $70 million to house displaced refugees and construct new facilities in Ukraine in collaboration with To Ukraine With Love. Hansen made several visits to Ukraine, where he toured donated homes with Ukrainian president Volodymyr Zelenskyy in 2023. The foundation's subsidiary, Hansen Ukrainian Mission, plans to provide free housing for five years and allow residents to buy their homes in the future. The program is also partially financed by donations from the sales of homes in the United States.

== Personal life ==
Hansen and his first wife Karla Axtell had eight children. His daughter Robin played college soccer for the Utah State Aggies in 2012. He was later married in 1997 to Lynnette Hansen, a business executive and philanthropist. Hansen is currently married to Julie Aiken Hansen. He is a member of the Church of Jesus Christ of Latter-day Saints and was a missionary in Spain.

Hansen has a large coin collection that is kept in Salt Lake City. He began to expand his collection with high-value acquisitions in 2017 with the goal of surpassing numismatist Louis E. Eliasberg's collection of U.S. coins. The collection includes a rare 1894-S Barber dime acquired for $1.3 million in 2019 as well as a 1804 Draped Bust dollar for $2.64 million. Hansen plans to sell 3,000 pieces from his collection to fund his philanthropic activities and preserve the rest through the Dell Loy Hansen Numismatic Foundation.
