= KBZN =

Radio station in Ogden–Salt Lake City, Utah

- Ogden, Utah; United States
- Broadcast area: Salt Lake City–Ogden–Provo, Utah
- Frequency: 97.9 MHz
- Branding: Now 97.9

Programming
- Format: Hot adult contemporary

Ownership
- Owner: Capital Broadcasting
- Sister stations: KLO-FM

History
- First air date: 1978 (as KZAN)
- Former call signs: KZAN (1978–1988); KKGB (1988–1989); KKWY (1989–1990)

Technical information
- Licensing authority: FCC
- Facility ID: 8690
- Class: C
- ERP: 26,000 watts
- HAAT: 1,149 meters (3,770 ft)
- Transmitter coordinates: 40°39′35″N 112°12′5″W
- Translator: 103.1 K276DR (Montpelier, Idaho)
- Repeater: 97.9 KBZN-FM1 (Park City)

Links
- Public license information: Public file; LMS
- Webcast: Listen Live
- Website: www.kbzn.com

KBZN (97.9 FM, "Now 97.9") is a commercial radio station licensed to Ogden, Utah and serving the Salt Lake City metropolitan area. The station airs a hot adult contemporary radio format and is owned by Capital Broadcasting.

The station's studios and offices are located at the 257 Tower building in downtown Salt Lake City, along with sister station KLO-FM. KBZN's transmitter site is located southwest of the city on Farnsworth Peak in the Oquirrh Mountains. The station is also heard on a repeater station, 97.9 KBZN-FM1 in Park City and on translator station 103.1 K276DR in Montpelier, Idaho.

== History ==
=== Country (1978–1989) ===
In 1978, the station first signed on as KZAN. The station was owned by Ben Lomand and broadcast a country music format. The station switched call letters to KKGB in 1988.

=== Top 40 (1989) ===
In 1989, the station changed its call sign to KKWY, as a Top 40 station.

=== Smooth jazz (1989–2009) ===
In late 1989, the license was purchased by locally based Capital Broadcasting, changed call letters to KBZN, and became a smooth jazz station as an affiliate of the syndicated service "The Breeze". For several years it was a locally programmed smooth jazz station.

=== Hot adult contemporary (2009–present) ===
In 2009, KBZN made the switch to hot AC and the "Now 97.9" moniker.
