= Radio from Hell =

Radio From Hell
- Genre: Comedy, Talk
- Running time: 4 hours
- Country of origin: United States
- Language: English
- Home station: KXRK 96.3
- TV adaptations: x96.com/live
- Starring: Kerry Jackson; Bill Allred; Gina Barberi
- Created by: Bill Allred; Kerry Jackson
- Executive producer: Caitlin "Caity for short" Jones
- Recording studio: KXRK, Salt Lake City, Utah
- Original release: 1986 – Present
- Audio format: FM radio; MP3 Podcast; iTunes Podcast
- Website: www.x96.com

Radio From Hell is an American radio program broadcast weekday mornings on Salt Lake City, Utah's KXRK 96.3FM, simulcast via a live internet audio stream, and available as an iTunes podcast or downloadable MP3. The show features hosts Kerry Jackson, Bill Allred, and Gina Barberi.

Rolling Stone cited KXRK as one of the top-five rock and roll radio stations in the U.S., and reported that Radio From Hell was one of the longest-running local radio programs in the U.S.

== History ==
The show originated on Ogden's KJQ as "The Fun Pigs", hosted by Jackson and Allred in 1986. It was later retitled to Radio From Hell for being "the radio show for people who feel like hell in the morning". Jackson and Allred were among five out of twenty-five employees who did not quit KJQ in December 1991.

Many members of the former KJQ staff founded a new station, KXRK, which premiered in February 1992. The new station featured Bill Allred and Dom Casual in a morning show called "Project X with Dom and Bill"; they were among many ex-KJQ personalities on the initial lineup on KXRK.

Kerry Jackson continued to host a morning show on KJQ, working briefly with several other hosts including Mo Mellady (who lasted less than a month) and Clyde Lewis, becoming KJQ program director in May, 1993. Jackson worked for a time on KZHT before joining KXRK on October 18, 1993, where he replaced Dom Casual in the mornings. Reunited, Jackson and Allred resumed calling their show "Radio From Hell."

On May 20, 1996, Gina Barberi joined the program. Barberi had been hosting a morning show on KUTQ called "Woody and Barberi" with co-host Scott Woodmansee; she had been working as a mid-day DJ at KUTQ before moving to this position. Gina had worked at KJQ in the late 1980s when she was 19 and still a student at the University of Utah.

Radio From Hell aired its 5000th episode in August 2008, and a 7500th episode celebration was being planned for September 2020. Unfortunately, due to the Coronavirus pandemic, this event did not happen.

The show is still on the air Monday through Friday 6:00 a.m. - 10:00 a.m. (MST) As of December 2020, the hosts were broadcasting from their own home set-ups (due to the Coronavirus pandemic) while their producer Caity continued to go into the studio.

As of July 5, 2021, the hosts returned to the studio and are no longer broadcasting from their home set-ups.

== Basic format ==
Radio From Hell (RFH) begins each morning at 5:00 A.M. Mountain Time. During the 5:00 A.M. hour, the previous day's 9:00 A.M - 10:00 A.M. segment of the previous show airs, interwoven with sound clips from various movies and television series. The live show runs from 6:00 A.M. and ends near 10:00 A.M. During the Coronavirus pandemic of 2020, the hosts briefly extended the show an additional hour.

The hosts regularly relate humorous anecdotes about their families, friends, jobs, pets, eating habits, shopping trips, vacations and other experiences. The show incorporates several regular features and guests noted below.

Radio From Hell's hosts, especially Jackson and Allred, are known for being socially and politically liberal. They frequently discuss the LDS Church, Utah state liquor laws and many other idiosyncrasies of Utah life and culture.

Listeners are called "friends of the program" and the show currently has a fairly active live chat room attached to the live video feed with regular listeners. Listeners can also text the show. X96 is currently part of the Broadway Media group.

== Controversy ==
In 2004, an advertising campaign for the show caused rumors that a same-sex marriage proposal was afoot in the area. "Rainbox billboards" featured the likeness of a typical, small-town Christian church in front of a rainbow, with the caption "Alternative Lifestyle? 'Til Death Do Us Part, " during an election season in which Utah voters were faced with the question of passing an anti-gay marriage amendment.

== Awards ==
As of 2021, Radio From Hell has won the Salt Lake City Weekly's reader's-choice award for Best Radio Show every year since the category was introduced in 2002.

Radio From Hell is the longest-running radio morning show in the Salt Lake City, Utah area, in its 35th year as of 2021.

Radio From Hell is the highest-rated radio show by 18- to 34-year-olds in the Salt Lake City market, according to Arbitron's Summer 2006 report.

In its 2006 summer double issue, Rolling Stone named KXRK (Radio From Hell's host station) as one of the top five rock stations in the country.
