= KALL =

- North Salt Lake, Utah; United States
- Broadcast area: Salt Lake City metropolitan area
- Frequency: 700 kHz
- Branding: ESPN 700

Programming
- Format: Sports
- Network: ESPN Radio
- Affiliations: Compass Media Networks; Utah Utes; Utah Warriors

Ownership
- Owner: Broadway Media; (Broadway Media LS, LLC)
- Sister stations: KNAH, KOVO, KUDD, KUUU, KXRK, KYMV

History
- First air date: September 22, 1981 (as KFAM)
- Former call signs: KFAM (1981–1998); KWLW (1998–2003)

Technical information
- Licensing authority: FCC
- Facility ID: 23480
- Class: B
- Power: 50,000 watts day 10,000 watts night
- Transmitter coordinates: 40°53′28.8″N 111°56′31.8″W
- Translator: 92.1 K221GK (Salt Lake City)
- Repeater: 96.3 KXRK-HD3 (Provo)

Links
- Public license information: Public file; LMS
- Webcast: Listen Live
- Website: espn700sports.com

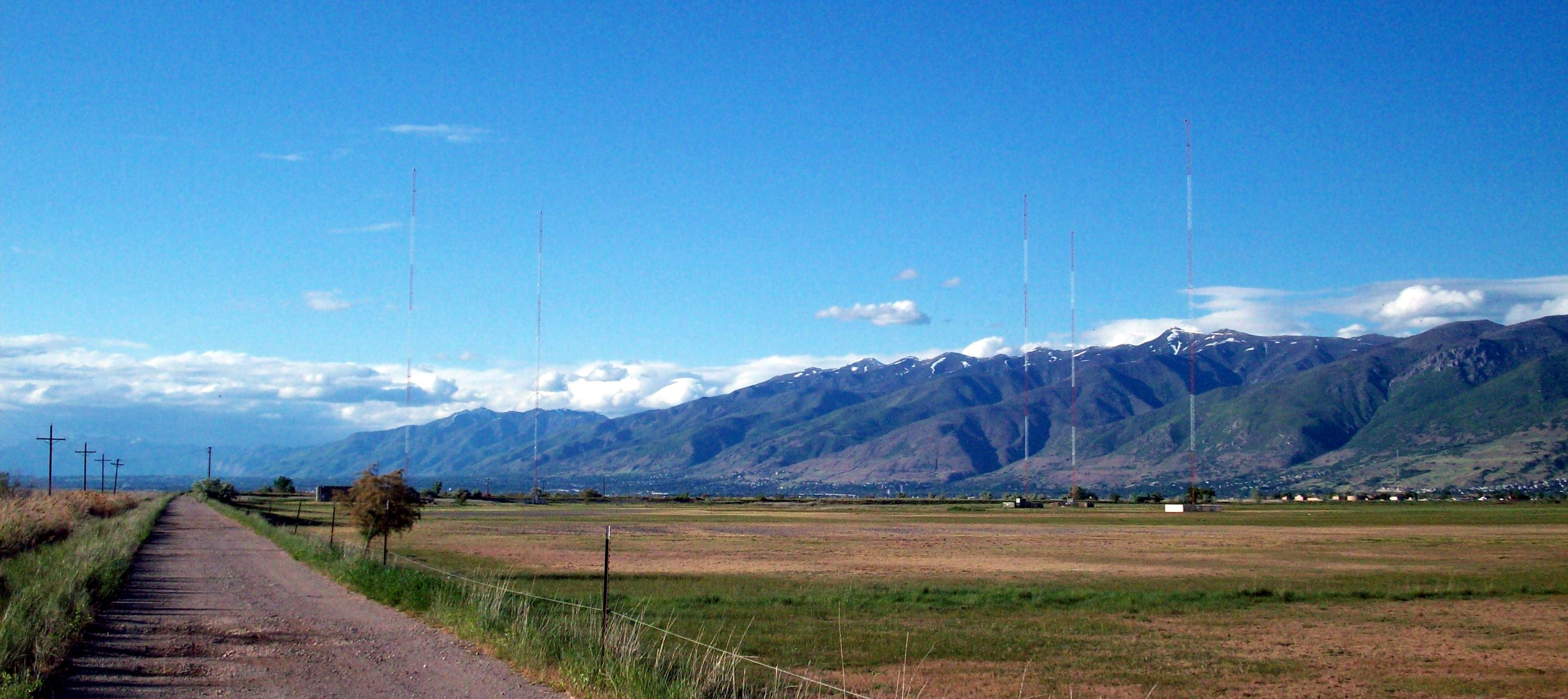
The radio towers for KALL AM 700, northwest of Salt Lake City, Utah.

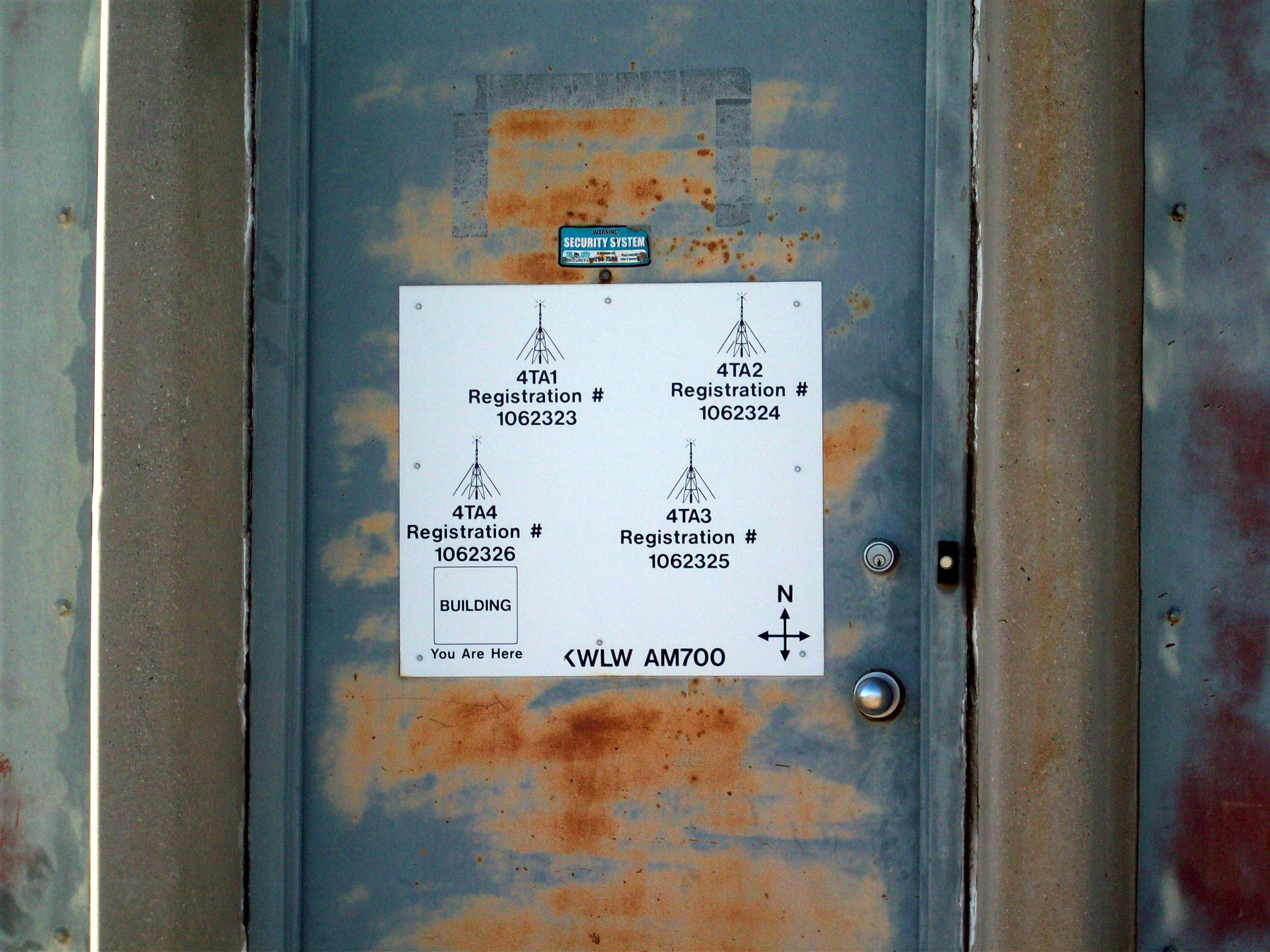
The door to the transmitter building clearly shows the station was once KWLW.

KALL (700 AM) is a sports radio station in the Salt Lake City metropolitan area licensed to North Salt Lake, Utah, though in station identifications and the FCC database, the station is listed as being licensed to "North Salt Lake City". The station is owned by Dell Loy Hansen's Broadway Media. The station's studios are located in Downtown Salt Lake City and its transmitter site is located in Legacy Nature Preserve west of Bountiful. Their sister station KOVO is also an ESPN Radio affiliate.

Program highlights include live play-by-play of University of Utah football and basketball and Real Salt Lake soccer, Keyshawn, JWill and Zubin, Greeny, the daily local show "The Bill & OC Show" and "Dan Patrick". KALL also carries the "NFL from Compass Media Networks" package.

== History ==
KALL in Utah was founded in 1945 by Mr. and Mrs. George C. Hatch and Mr. and Mrs Robert H. Hinkley. In 1946 the Salt Lake Tribune, owned by the Kearns Corporation, through the efforts of John F. Fitzpatrick and Tribune's president Thomas F. Kearns purchased a fifty percent interest in the radio station. This interest was in turn sold in 1954 to permit the Kearns-Tribune Corporation in a new joint venture to apply for the license of and launch, KUTV on channel 2.

700 AM signed on the air September 22, 1981 as KFAM. KFAM broadcast a beautiful music format in AM stereo. In 1997, WLW owner Jacor purchased KFAM, which broadcast with 50,000 watts during the day and 10,000 watts at night in order to protect WLW. They changed the call letters to KWLW and even began to air programming such as Dale Sommers "The Truckin' Bozo" (also heard on WLW) on the station. The station aired a classic country format until 2003, when Clear Channel Communications moved the KALL letters and programming from 910 AM.

Clear Channel sold KALL to UT Radio Acquisition LLC in 2006., and the station is now owned by Broadway Media. ESPN 700 added MMA fighter "OC" Sean O'Connell in 2014.

== Programming ==
The station primarily airs their contracted ESPN Radio talk programming. Aside from this, the station airs the locally produced The Bill Riley Show on weekday mornings and The Drive with Spence Checketts on weekday afternoons. The station is the flagship broadcaster of the Utah Utes Learfield network, broadcasting Utes football, Utes basketball, and Utes baseball games. Until 2023, KALL was the flagship radio station of Real Salt Lake soccer matches. In 2023, Real Salt Lake left KALL for KSL When not running the above, ESPN 700 broadcasts nationally syndicated content from Major League Baseball on ESPN Radio, NBA on ESPN Radio, ESPN Radio College Football, and the National Football League on Westwood One Sports.
