= KUUU =

Radio station in South Jordan–Salt Lake City, Utah

Coordinates: 40.660°N 112.202°W

- South Jordan, Utah; United States
- Broadcast area: Salt Lake City-Ogden-Provo
- Frequency: 92.5 MHz (HD Radio)
- Branding: 92.5 The Beat

Programming
- Format: Rhythmic adult contemporary (daytime) rhythmic contemporary (nighttime)
- Subchannels: HD2: KYMV (Adult hits); HD3: KNAH (Classic country)

Ownership
- Owner: Broadway Media; (Broadway Media LS, LLC)
- Sister stations: KNAH, KXRK, KYMV, KUDD, KALL, KOVO

History
- First air date: September 1, 1979 (as KTLE at 92.1)
- Former call signs: KTLE (1979–1982); KTLE-FM (1982–1997); KTKL (1997–1999)
- Former frequencies: 92.1 MHz (1979–2005)
- Call sign meaning: "Utah"

Technical information
- Facility ID: 37876
- Class: C1
- ERP: 3,700 watts
- HAAT: 1,197 meters (3,927 ft)
- Repeater: 105.1 KUDD-HD3 (American Fork)

Links
- Webcast: Listen Live
- Website: 925thebeat.com

KUUU (92.5 FM, "92.5 The Beat") is a radio station licensed to South Jordan, Utah, serving the Salt Lake City metropolitan area. Owned by Broadway Media, the station primarily broadcasts a Rhythmic adult contemporary format during the daytime hours, but transitions to a rhythmic contemporary-based playlist during the evening and overnight hours. The station's studios are located in Downtown Salt Lake City and its transmitter site is located southwest of the city on Farnsworth Peak in the Oquirrh Mountains.

KUUU broadcasts in HD Radio, carrying simulcasts of sister stations KYMV and KNAH on its HD2 and HD3 subchannels. In turn, KUUU is simulcast on the HD3 subchannel of sister station KUDD.

== History ==
The station was launched on September 1, 1979, and adopted its callsign KTLE on September 10. On May 19, 1982, it was modified to KTLE-FM. On May 9, 1997, it was slightly changed to KTKL.

The station previously carried a "nostalgia" format; on February 27, 1999, the station flipped to rhythmic contemporary as U92, and applied for the call letters KUUU to match the new branding. The launch of U92 returned the rhythmic contemporary format to the Salt Lake City market for the first time since KZHT's 1997 flip to contemporary hit radio. The station was originally licensed to Tooele, Utah, and relied on a translator on 92.3 to cover Provo, Utah. In February 2005, the station relocated from 92.1 FM to 92.5 FM, and changed its city of license to South Jordan, allowing it to better cover the Salt Lake Valley.

In contrast to the conservatism of the market (due to it being the base of the LDS Church), KUUU frequently ranked among Salt Lake City's highest-rated radio stations among listeners 18–34. This demographic is especially prominent in Utah due to it having the youngest median age among all U.S. states. KUUU also gained a reputation for helping to break singles from artists such as Flo Rida, Plies, and T-Pain. In 2008, program director Brian Michel credited not being owned by a larger conglomerate as giving KUUU flexibility in serving its audience, commenting that "people in San Antonio aren't telling us what to play. We have no outside consultants." In February 2008, it was reported that a reality show following the station's staff was being pitched.

On June 18, 2010, KUUU, along with KUDD and KYLZ, were sold to Simmons Media Group, who in turn sold the stations to Broadway Media in 2013. In 2016, KUUU initially applied to move to 92.3 FM and upgrade its signal coverage as part of a deal that Broadway made with Community Wireless, who moved KPCW-FM down from 91.9 to 91.7 and took ownership of KUDD that Broadway donated to them earlier, but then instead later applied to its wattage from 500 watts to 3,700 watts and decrease its HAAT from 1,198 meters (3,930 ft) to 1,197 meters (3,927 ft), increasing its coverage area by approximately 15 miles in all directions.

Previous logo as U92; a gold-colored version was used from 2019, while previous versions used the wordmark in blue and purple.

The station promoted hip-hop concert events such as the "U92 Summer Jam". In February 2019, KUUU held the "20th Anniversary Throwback Jam" concert at Vivint Arena to celebrate the 20th anniversary of U92, headlined by Ice Cube.

=== 92.5 The Beat ===
By June 2022, KUUU's ratings had fallen to a 0.8 share, tied for 24th place in the Salt Lake City market. Broadway Media hired Matt 'Mateo' Walling as Program Director. The station had also pivoted to predominantly airing classic hip-hop music between 6:00 am, and 7:00 pm daily, relegating current and recurrent music to the evening and overnight hours. On August 5, at 5 pm, KUUU began stunting with a loop of "Jiggle Jiggle" by Duke & Jones and Louis Theroux, interspersed with bumpers promoting a "goodbye to U, but not 92" on August 8 at 3:00 pm, and a 92-cent gasoline giveaway whose location would be revealed at that time, in addition to self-deprecating jokes about the station's low ratings. At the promised time, KUUU rebranded as 92.5 The Beat to emphasize the new positioning.

By January 2023, KUUU shifted to rhythmic adult contemporary (as shown with its playlist and its new positioner, "The Rhythm of Salt Lake" (which eventually became "The Beat of Salt Lake"). The station still continues to play current Rhythmic hits in the evening/nighttime.
