= KUMT =

BYU Radio station in Randolph–Salt Lake City, Utah

- Randolph, Utah; United States
- Broadcast area: Salt Lake City metropolitan area
- Frequency: 107.9 MHz
- Branding: BYU Radio

Programming
- Format: Talk
- Affiliations: BYU Radio

Ownership
- Owner: Brigham Young University
- Sister stations: TV: KSL-TV, KBYU-TV; Radio: KBYU-FM, KSL, KSFI, KSL-FM

History
- First air date: 1984 (as KRGO)
- Former call signs: KRGO (1984–1986); KRPN (1986–1992); KZQQ-FM (2/1992-12/1992); KRGQ-FM (1992–1995); KRGO (1995–1996); KRKR (1996–1998); KSNU (1998–1999); KWKD (11/1999-12/1999); KSNU (1999–2000); KFVR-FM (2000–2001); KUDD (2001–2016)
- Call sign meaning: Utah Mountain (previous format)

Technical information
- Licensing authority: FCC
- Facility ID: 33438
- Class: C
- ERP: 89,000 watts
- HAAT: 647 meters (2,123 ft)
- Transmitter coordinates: 40°52′16″N 110°59′46″W
- Repeater: See § Boosters

Links
- Public license information: Public file; LMS
- Webcast: www.byuradio.org/listen
- Website: www.byuradio.org

KUMT (107.9 FM) is a radio station licensed to Randolph, Utah, United States, and serving the Salt Lake City metropolitan area. The station's transmitter is located on Humpy Peak in the Uinta Mountain range. Under the previous calls, KUDD and prior, the stations transmitter was located near Promontory Point, Utah, in Box Elder County.

== History ==
=== Commercial (1984–2016) ===
==== Country (1984–1986) ====
The station was first licensed in 1984. The station held the callsign KRGO, and aired a country music format, simulcasting sister station KRGO 1550.

==== Oldies (1986–1992) ====
On September 19, 1986, the station's callsign was changed to KRPN. As KRPN, the station aired an oldies format, and was branded "WKRP".

==== Hard rock (1992) ====
On February 10, 1992, the station's callsign was changed to KZQQ-FM. As KZQQ-FM in 1992, the station aired the Z Rock heavy metal format.

==== Country (1992–1996) ====
On September 14, 1992, the station adopted a country music format. On December 28, 1992, the station's callsign was changed to KRGQ-FM, and on May 12, 1995, the station's callsign was changed to KRGO.

==== Rock (1996–1997) ====
On October 18, 1996, the station's callsign was changed to KRKR. As KRKR, the station aired a rock format as "K-Rock".

==== Adult standards (1997–1998) ====
In July 1997, the station began airing the "Timeless" adult standards format, and was known as "Sunny 107.9". On January 1, 1998, the station's callsign was changed to KSNU.

==== Adult contemporary (1998–1999) ====
In early August 1998, the station's format changed to adult contemporary as a simulcast of KOSY 106.5.

==== Alternative (1999–2000) ====
The simulcast ended in July 1999, when the station became "The Edge", which served as a placeholder format until the station's sale was consummated.

==== Rhythmic oldies (2000–2001) ====
On January 18, 2000, the station became KFVR-FM, and the station adopted a rhythmic oldies format as "Fever 107.9" "Utah's Movin' Oldies".

==== Top 40 (2001–2016) ====
In 2001, the station flipped to a top 40 format as "Power 107-9", "Utah's Hit Music Station". The KUDD call letters would be adopted during this time. With trying attempting to go after KZHT, they added a simulcast on the 103.9 frequency as "KMDG" to better cover the western area of Salt Lake. The general manager named the station "Dianna 107.9" briefly before rebranding as "Power".

The station shifted from a modern adult contemporary format to a top 40 (CHR) format in 2009.

On June 18, 2010, Millcreek, KUDD's owners, sold the station, along with KUUU and KYLZ to Simmons Media Group. Simmons continued to operate KUDD and its sister stations until they were sold to Broadway Media in 2014. Around this time, the station moved its signal from Promontory Peak west of Ogden to Humpy Peak, allowing for better coverage of the areas south of Salt Lake City, including Provo.

Announcers at the time included Lexi, Banks, MJ, Dylan and Jake Stone.

=== Non-commercial (2016–present) ===
==== Adult alternative (2016–2018) ====
Logo as KUMT before the sale to BYU Radio.

On December 2, 2015, Broadway stated that it would donate KUDD to Community Wireless of Park City, Inc., which in turn would move KPCW-FM down from 91.9 to 91.7 while the Mix format would move to 105.1. The move took place on March 31, 2016 at 10:51 AM; the last song on "Mix" on 107.9 was "My House" by Flo Rida. 107.9 adopted the new callsign KUMT.

On April 25, 2016, KUMT flipped to an adult album alternative format, branded as "107.9 The Mountain".

On May 6, 2016, KUMT ended its "Mountain" AAA format after ten days with the format. After a few days of stunting, KUMT would return to AAA and the "Mountain" branding, now under the operation of Community Wireless.

==== BYU radio (2018–present) ====
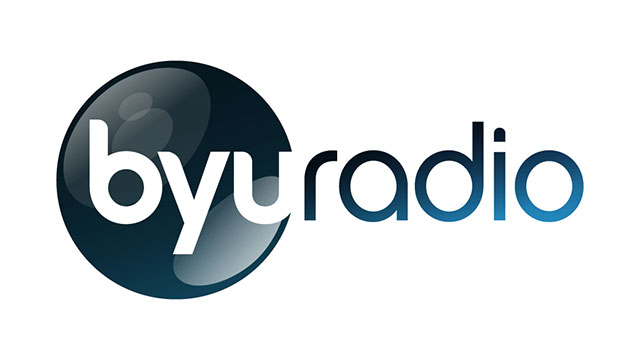
Logo of BYU Radio before 2019.

On April 26, 2018, Brigham Young University announced it would acquire KUMT for an undisclosed amount. The university uses KUMT as a full-time outlet for its campus-run radio network BYU Radio. The university had originally planned to drop KBYU-FM's classical music format in favor of BYU Radio, but the plans were met with criticism by listeners. The purchase was consummated on August 31, 2018, at a price of $875,000. BYU Radio programming officially began airing on the station September 17, 2018. KUMT airs all BYU Radio programming except football and men's basketball (which are broadcast by de facto commercial sister station KSL). In 2019 KUMT officially became the flagship station for BYU women's soccer followed by BYU Baseball in 2020. As a result BYU Radio no longer streams those events on KBYU-HD 2. They were streamed on the BYU Sports Radio app and usually simulcast on ESPN 960 until BYU entered the Big 12. Once BYU entered the Big 12 women's soccer radio brpadcasts were dropped, but women's basketball games were added. The streaming platform was also moved from the BYU Sports Radio app to byuradio.org.

== Boosters ==
Call sign	Frequency	City of license	FID	ERP (W)	HAAT	Class	FCC info
KUMT-FM1	107.9 FM	Salt Lake City, Utah	106586	2,100	296 m (971 ft)	D	LMS
KUMT-FM2	107.9 FM	Ogden, Utah	122080	500	28 m (92 ft)	D	LMS
KUMT-FM4	107.9 FM	Bountiful, Utah	136266	2,200	217 m (712 ft)	D	LMS
KUMT-FM5	107.9 FM	Provo, Utah	198318	1,750	−161 m (−528 ft)	D	LMS
