= KMES =

Radio station in Ogden, Utah

Coordinates: 41°02′49″N 112°01′37″W

- Ogden, Utah; United States
- Broadcast area: Salt Lake City metropolitan area
- Frequency: 1430 kHz

Programming
- Language: Spanish
- Format: Catholic radio
- Network: ESNE Radio

Ownership
- Owner: El Sembrador Ministries

History
- First air date: January 28, 1925
- Former call signs: KFUR (1925–1929); KLO (1929–2020)
- Call sign meaning: Ministries El Sembrador

Technical information
- Licensing authority: FCC
- Facility ID: 35069
- Class: B
- Power: 25,000 watts day; 5,000 watts night

Links
- Public license information: Public file; LMS
- Website: ESNE Radio

KMES (1430 AM) is a non-commercial radio station licensed to Ogden, Utah, and serving the Salt Lake City metropolitan area. The station is owned by El Sembrador Ministries and carries Spanish-language Catholic radio programming from its ESNE Radio network.

KMES operates at 25,000 watts by day and 5,000 watts at night, using a four-tower array directional antenna. KMES's transmitter is near the Great Salt Lake in Layton, Utah. All four of KMES's towers are different heights, which is unusual.

== History ==
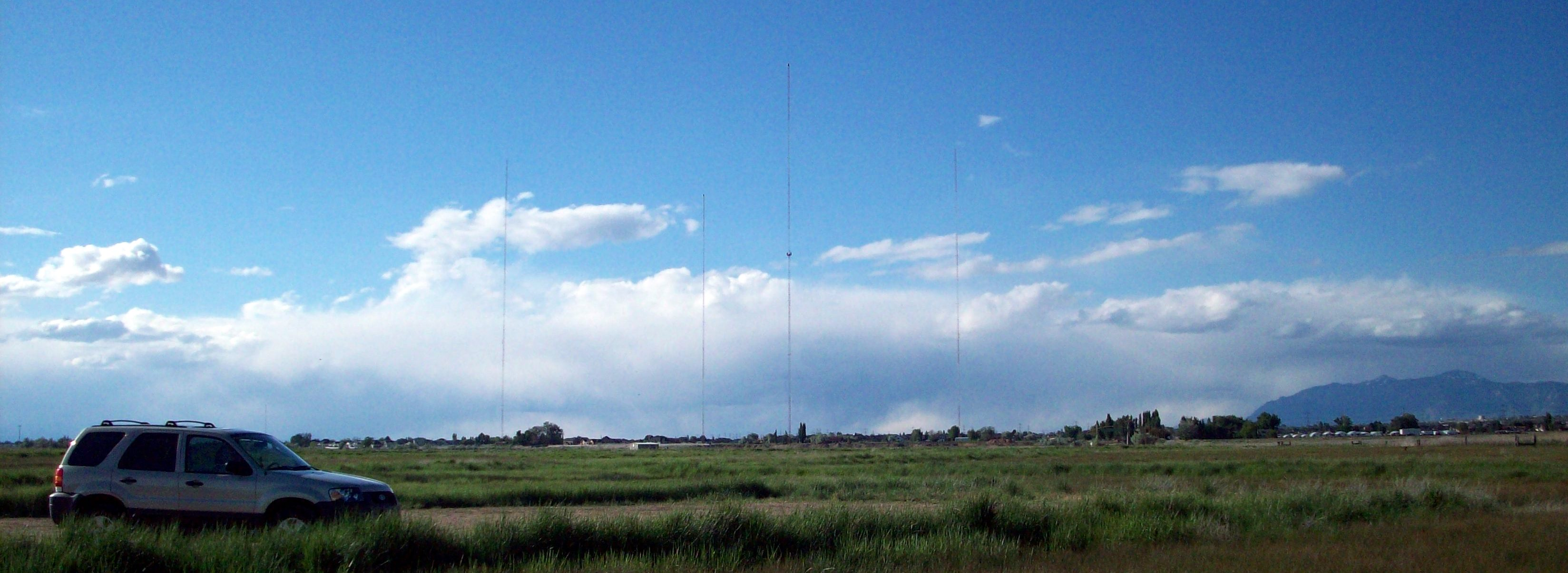
The radio towers for KMES 1430, near Layton, Utah.

KMES signed on as KFUR on January 28, 1925, making it Utah's third-oldest radio station. The call sign was changed to KLO in April 1929. In 1934, the Ogden Standard-Examiner purchased the station. As late as 1935, KLO was the only radio station on the air in Utah outside of Salt Lake City, which had two stations: KSL and KDYL. KLO was the flagship station of the Interstate Broadcasting Corporation, later the Intermountain Network.

During the 1960s and 70s, KLO was a Top 40 station. In 1979, the station's ownership changed to KLO Broadcasting, Inc., switching the station to full service adult contemporary music in the 1980s and '90s.

In 2001, KLO flipped to a conservative talk format and picked up Weber State University sports; many of its talk shows came from the Salem Radio Network. In the 2010s, the station received a construction permit from the Federal Communications Commission (FCC) to change its transmitter location and increase its daytime power to 25,000 watts.

In 2012, Capital Broadcasting purchased KJQN Coalville from the Simmons Media Group and began to simulcast KLO's programming on 103.1 FM. The purchase was approved by the FCC in July and KJQN promptly changed its call letters to KLO-FM. Two other Salt Lake City-area talk stations also had FM simulcasts, 1160 KSL and 570 KNRS, so KLO management felt it should do the same to stay competitive. The simulcast lasted two years.

In 2014, 103.1 FM switched to adult contemporary music as KSQN; KLO's programming was once again available only on the AM dial. On December 11, 2018, KLO switched from talk to Westwood One's soft oldies and adult standards music format. The service was called "America's Best Music," but KLO branded itself as "Unforgettable 1430." Most hours began with CBS Radio News.

=== Sale to El Sembrador ===
On July 15, 2020, KLO was sold to El Sembrador Ministries for $260,000. El Sembrador filed an FCC Form 302-AM application to change the status of the station from commercial to non-commercial, which was later approved by the FCC. The historic three-letter KLO call letters were excluded from the sale, to be retained by Capital Broadcasting.

On August 31, 2020, it was announced that KSQN would be the new radio home for Weber State football and men's basketball games. Veteran Weber State announcer Steve Klauke will continue to be the voice of the Wildcats for play-by-play, pre-game, and post-game duties.

On October 13, 2020, KLO Broadcasting Co. closed on the sale of the station to El Sembrador Ministries. Per the FCC database, the new call letters for the station would be KMES. Programming from El Sembrador Ministries began airing on KLO on October 21, 2020. The call sign change from KLO to KMES became effective on November 3, 2020. KSQN, by then a classic alternative rock station, concurrently returned to the KLO-FM call sign.
