= Broadway Media =

American radio broadcast company

Broadway Media is a radio and digital media company based in Salt Lake City, Utah, United States.

Broadway Media was founded by Former Real Salt Lake owner Dell Loy Hansen. Stephen Johnson was named CEO/GM of Broadway Media in 2014, and former Simmons Media CEO/GM G. Craig Hansen retired at the same time.

== Radio stations ==
KALL | ESPN 700 AM, Sports

KNAH | 101.5 Hank FM. Country

KOVO | ESPN 960 AM, Sports

KUDD | Mix 105.1 FM, Top 40 (CHR)

KUUU | 92.5 FM The Beat, Rhythmic AC

KYMV | 100.7 & 105.5 Bob FM, Adult Hits

KXRK | X96 FM, Alternative Rock

KXRK-HD2 | X96 Classic HD2, Classic Alternative
