= KXRK =

Radio station in Salt Lake City

- Provo, Utah; United States
- Broadcast area: Salt Lake City metropolitan area
- Frequency: 96.3 MHz (HD Radio)
- Branding: X96

Programming
- Format: Alternative rock
- Subchannels: HD2: X96 Classic HD2 (classic alternative); HD3: KALL (sports)

Ownership
- Owner: Broadway Media; (Broadway Media LS, LLC)
- Sister stations: KUUU, KNAH, KUDD, KYMV, KALL, KOVO

History
- First air date: February 14, 1968 (as KFMC at 96.1)
- Former call signs: KFMC (1968–1976); KAYK-FM (1976–1981); KFMY (1981–1986); KFMY-FM (1986–1988); KZOL (1988–1992)
- Former frequencies: 96.1 MHz (1968–1996)
- Call sign meaning: "X Rock"

Technical information
- Licensing authority: FCC
- Facility ID: 406
- Class: C
- ERP: 22,000 watts
- HAAT: 1,243 meters (4,078 ft)
- Transmitter coordinates: 40°39′34.8″N 112°12′7.8″W
- Repeater: 96.3 KXRK-FM1 (Park City)

Links
- Public license information: Public file; LMS
- Webcast: Listen Live; Listen Live (HD2)
- Website: x96.com

KXRK (96.3 FM, branded as X96) is a commercial radio station located in Salt Lake City, Utah, United States, broadcasting an alternative rock music format to the Provo, Ogden, and Salt Lake City metropolitan areas. Owned by Broadway Media, the station's studios are located in Downtown Salt Lake City and its transmitter site is located southwest of the city on Farnsworth Peak in the Oquirrh Mountains.

== History ==
=== KFMC (1966–1976) ===
KOVO, Inc., received the construction permit for a radio station on 96.1 MHz in Provo on May 9, 1966. The new FM outlet took the call letters KFMC and signed on February 14, 1968. KOVO and KFMC were placed in receivership in 1973, after Glenn C. Shaw sued co-owner Ashley J. Robison asking for a financial accounting of KOVO, Inc.'s operations; when the case could not be settled, the stations were ordered into receivership and bids were accepted to buy the company. Both owners placed bids, but they were beaten out by First Media Corporation of Washington, D.C., whose principal was a former Utah resident and which also had J.W. Marriott Jr. as an investor. However, First Media did not become the owner of KOVO-KFMC until 1976 because the other parties appealed the district court's decision all the way to the Utah Supreme Court.

=== Adult contemporary (1976–1981) ===
First Media immediately made a mark on the operations of both stations, changing the call letters of KFMC to KAYK-FM on June 1, 1976. KAYK-AM-FM simulcasted as adult contemporary outlet "K-96". The stations remained a simulcast until 1980, when 960 AM broke off as KDOT.

=== Top 40 (1981–1988) ===
The call letters were changed to KFMY in 1981 and the station moved in a contemporary hit radio direction.

In 1987, First Media announced it would sell its 11 radio stations, including KFMY-AM-FM, to a partnership of Cook Inlet Region, Inc., a company principally owned by Alaska Natives, and Whitcom Partners, a group of New York investors led by the Whitney family; this gave First Media a tax break under policies that promoted minority ownership of radio stations.

=== Oldies (1988–1992) ===
Under Cook Inlet, KFMY-FM flipped to oldies in 1988 as KZOL. The Great Stock Company of Vast International Import acquired KFMY-KZOL in 1990 from Cook Inlet for $972,000.

=== Alternative (1992–present) ===
The slumping KZOL, however, went through a major change in 1992, precipitated as much by events at another Salt Lake City-area station as by its own poor performance. In late 1991, 23 of the 25 disc jockeys at alternative outlet KJQN-FM (95.5), known as "KJQ", quit after the station hired a new general manager, making them question the ownership's commitment to its "modern music" format. The result was that on February 13, 1992, with the financial backing of concert promoter J. C. McNeil, many of the former KJQ airstaff, organizing as the Acme Broadcasting Company, started a new alternative rocker on the former KZOL as KXRK "X96". The Great Stock Company said that because of KZOL's unsatisfactory ratings performance as an adult contemporary outlet, it was willing to entertain brokering the station to Acme, which retained KZOL's sales and office staff but none of its air personalities.

The result was an unusual format war between "new rock outlets" which ended when KJQN-FM flipped to CHR in October. Ex-KJQ DJs on the new X96 included Bill Allred (mornings), Dom Casual (mornings), Andrea Gappmayer (mid-day), Mike Summers (afternoon), Todd Nuke'em (evening) and Chet Tapp (overnight). Acme acquired the station from Great Stock in 1993 for $925,000; the application included a copy of a lawsuit filed by the former KJQN-FM, alleging that its former employees took equipment, including a live truck known as the "Milk Beast", when they defected, and that the ex-KJQ staffers used KJQN-owned trademarks and made defamatory remarks about their former station.

Since fall 1995, X96 has hosted an annual all-day music festival called the Big Ass Show (BASh) featuring nationally touring alternative and punk bands, as well as providing a stage for local bands. In 1996, X96 underwent a major technical overhaul, moving to 96.3 MHz from a transmitter on Farnsworth Peak, increasing its coverage area (particularly in Utah County).

In April 1998, Acme sold KXRK to Simmons Media Group. Simmons moved X96 to studios located on the corner of Broadway and 2nd West in Salt Lake City. In its 2006 summer double issue, Rolling Stone named KXRK one of five "awesome rock outlets" that were thriving in their markets despite a recent contraction in rock radio stations across the United States.

In 2014, Broadway Media acquired Simmons Media Group for $11 million after having taken over operations the previous year. Broadway moved X96 and its sister stations to new studios on 50 W. Broadway (300 S.) in downtown Salt Lake City; the company currently houses seven stations at this location.

In the 2020s, the station expanded their playlist to include more classic alternative songs from the 1980s, while still playing new music. The station currently uses the slogan, "Utah's Original Alternative." After the demise of the rivals KLO-FM and KHTB, X96 is the only alternative formatted station in Salt Lake City.

== See also ==
- List of Salt Lake City media
