= North Salt Lake, Utah =

City in Utah, United States

- City
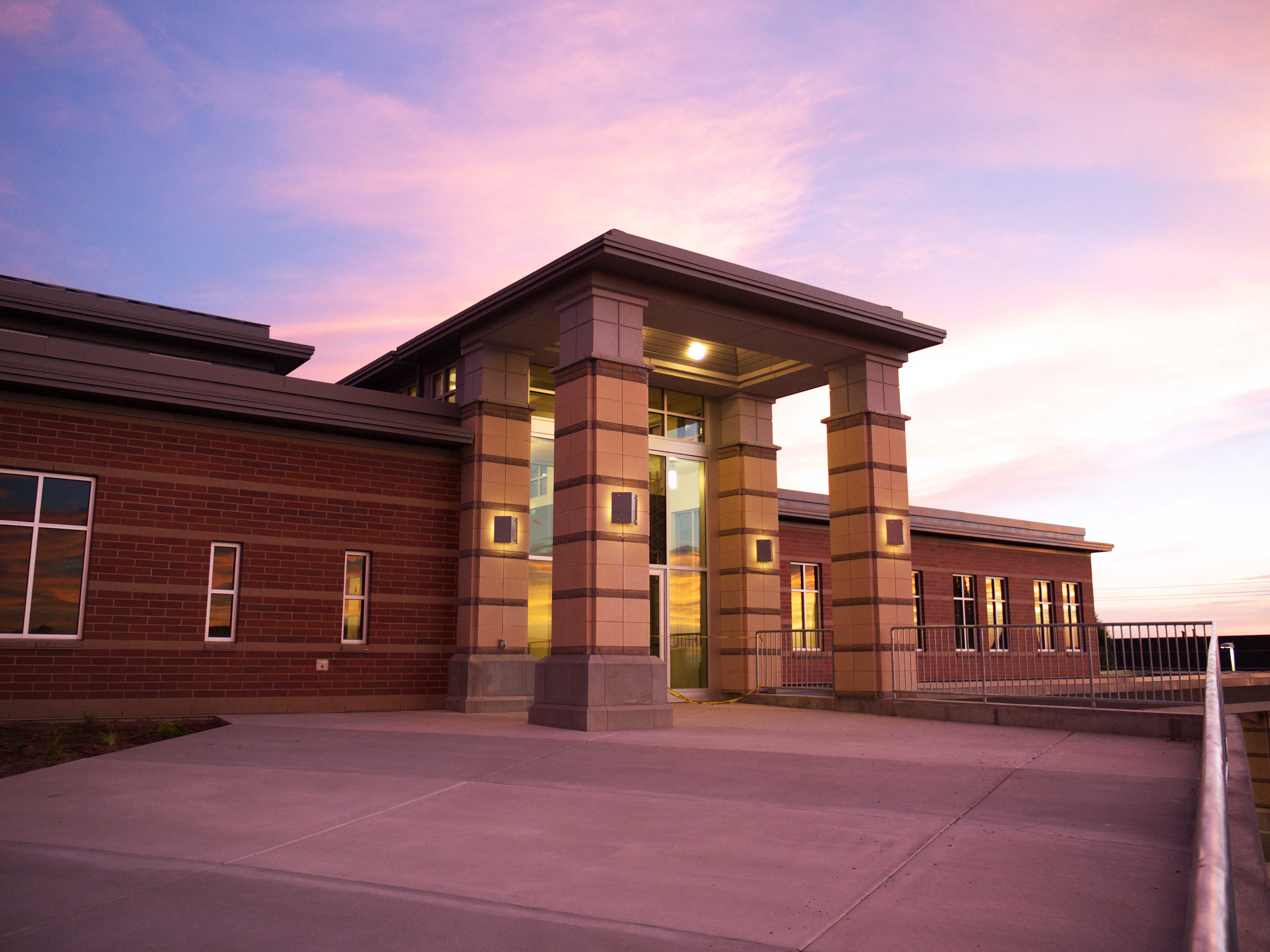
- North Salt Lake City Hall, completed in 2010

- Location in Davis County and the state of Utah
- Coordinates: 40°50′25″N 111°54′15″W
- Country: United States
- State: Utah
- County: Davis
- Incorporated: 1946
- Named for: Great Salt Lake

Area
  - Total: 8.51 sq mi (22.04 km^{2})
  - Land: 8.47 sq mi (21.93 km^{2})
  - Water: 0.046 sq mi (0.12 km^{2})
- Elevation: 4,242 ft (1,293 m)

Population (2020)
  - Total: 21,907
  - Density: 2,474.3/sq mi (955.33/km^{2})
- Time zone: UTC-7 (Mountain (MST))
  - Summer (DST): UTC-6 (MDT)
- ZIP code: 84054
- Area code: 385, 801
- FIPS code: 49-55210
- GNIS feature ID: 2411279
- Website: nslcity.org

North Salt Lake is a city in Davis County, Utah, United States. It is part of the Ogden–Clearfield, Utah Metropolitan Statistical Area. The population was 16,322 at the 2010 census, which had risen to 21,907 as of 2020.

The city is often casually known as North Salt Lake City as it shares a municipal boundary with Salt Lake City to the south, though the city's actual corporate name is "The City of North Salt Lake". The error also has been solidified with the Federal Communications Commission, which has radio station KALL (700) officially licensed to "North Salt Lake City", though that station serves the general Salt Lake City market.

== Demographics ==
Historical population
Census	Pop.	Note	%±
1950	255		—
1960	1,655		549.0%
1970	2,143		29.5%
1980	5,548		158.9%
1990	6,474		16.7%
2000	8,749		35.1%
2010	16,322		86.6%
2020	21,907		34.2%
U.S. Decennial Census

=== 2020 census ===
As of the 2020 census, North Salt Lake had a population of 21,907. The median age was 30.6 years. 30.7% of residents were under the age of 18 and 8.7% of residents were 65 years of age or older. For every 100 females there were 100.0 males, and for every 100 females age 18 and over there were 97.4 males age 18 and over.

99.2% of residents lived in urban areas, while 0.8% lived in rural areas.

There were 7,220 households in North Salt Lake, of which 43.0% had children under the age of 18 living in them. Of all households, 59.6% were married-couple households, 14.6% were households with a male householder and no spouse or partner present, and 19.2% were households with a female householder and no spouse or partner present. About 18.0% of all households were made up of individuals and 4.6% had someone living alone who was 65 years of age or older.

There were 7,519 housing units, of which 4.0% were vacant. The homeowner vacancy rate was 0.9% and the rental vacancy rate was 4.8%.

Racial composition as of the 2020 census
Race	Number	Percent
White	16,125	73.6%
Black or African American	310	1.4%
American Indian and Alaska Native	289	1.3%
Asian	776	3.5%
Native Hawaiian and Other Pacific Islander	595	2.7%
Some other race	1,677	7.7%
Two or more races	2,135	9.7%
Hispanic or Latino (of any race)	3,696	16.9%

== Geography ==
North Salt Lake is located in southern Davis County; it is bordered to the north by Woods Cross, to the northeast by Bountiful, and to the south by Salt Lake City in Salt Lake County. According to the United States Census Bureau, North Salt Lake has a total area of 8.6 square miles (22.2 km^{2}), of which 0.1 square miles (0.2 km^{2}), or 0.80%, is water.

== See also ==
- List of cities and towns in Utah
