= KNIV =

Radio station in Lyman, Wyoming, serving Salt Lake City, Utah

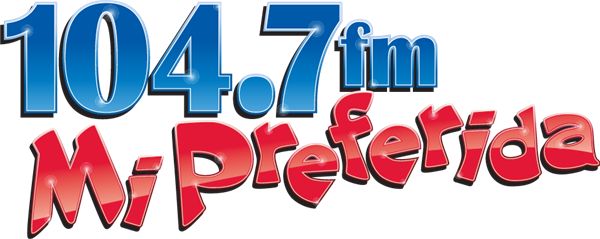
- Lyman, Wyoming; United States
- Broadcast area: Salt Lake City metropolitan area
- Frequency: 104.7 MHz
- Branding: 104.7 Mi Preferida

Programming
- Format: Regional Mexican

Ownership
- Owner: Aerostar Communications, LLC
- Sister stations: KEGH

History
- First air date: 1989
- Former call signs: KBXQ-FM (1989–1992); KGSC (1992–1993); KNFL-FM (1993–1999); KNFL (1999–2001, 2001); KACE (2001); KENT (2001–2002); KBNZ (2002–2005); KYLZ (2005–2011); KZNS-FM (2011)
- Former frequencies: 104.9 MHz (1989–2005)

Technical information
- Licensing authority: FCC
- Facility ID: 20304
- Class: C
- ERP: 89,000 watts
- HAAT: 647 meters (2,123 ft)
- Transmitter coordinates: 40°52′16″N 110°59′43″W
- Repeater: See § Boosters

Links
- Public license information: Public file; LMS
- Webcast: Listen live
- Website: mipreferidafm.com

KNIV (104.7 FM) is a radio station broadcasting a regional Mexican format. Licensed to Lyman, Wyoming, United States, it serves the Salt Lake City metropolitan area. The station is currently owned by Aerostar Communications, LLC.

Throughout the late 2000s, the station went through several formats before settling on adult album alternative, and becoming "104.7 The Point".

Until February 1, 2011, the station featured locally programmed music from the 1980s, 1990s, 2000s and today, formerly heard on 101.9 The End (KENZ). The End in April 2010 abandoned its adult album alternative (Triple A) format and then became "Gen X Radio," playing an eclectic mix of 1990s and 2000s Top 40 music. In early 2011, KENZ returned to its previous format, going against KYLZ for a short period of time.

On June 18, 2010, 3 Points Media, KYLZ's owners, announced that it was selling the station, along with KUDD and KUUU to Simmons Media Group. Pending FCC approval, the companies will continue to operate separately until a plan to divest several properties to comply with FCC ownership rules is announced.

On February 1, 2011, KYLZ changed its format to sports, branded as "The Zone", simulcasting KZNS 1280 AM Salt Lake City, Utah. On February 3, 2011, KYLZ changed its call letters to KZNS-FM to reflect the new format.

On July 7, 2011, KZNS-FM's sports format moved to KZZQ 97.5 FM Coalville, Utah (formerly active rock as "The Blaze"), while the 104.7 frequency changed its format to regional Mexican. On July 15, 2011, KZNS-FM (those calls moved to 97.5 FM) changed their call letters to KNIV.

== Boosters ==
Call sign	Frequency	City of license	FID	ERP (W)	Class	FCC info
KNIV-FM1	104.7 FM	Ogden, Utah	178846	500	D	LMS
KNIV-FM2	104.7 FM	Provo, Utah	178844	1,750	D	LMS
KNIV-FM3	104.7 FM	Salt Lake City, Utah	178843	2,100	D	LMS
KNIV-FM4	104.7 FM	Bountiful, Utah	178845	2,200	D	LMS
KNIV-FM5	104.7 FM	Park City, Utah	191626	500	D	LMS
KNIV-FM6	104.7 FM	Heber City, Utah	199468	250	D	LMS
