= Taylorsville High School =

- Taylorsville High School in September 2006

Location
- 5225 S. Redwood Road; Taylorsville, Utah 84123; United States; 40°39′20″N 111°56′12″W

Information
- Type: Public
- Established: 1981
- School district: Granite School District
- Superintendent: Ben Horsley
- Principal: Mark Ellermeier
- Teaching staff: 99.34 (FTE)
- Grades: 9-12
- Enrollment: 2,694 (2023–2024)
- Student to teacher ratio: 27.12
- Colors: Royal blue, gold, and white
- Mascot: Wilbur the Warrior
- Nickname: Warriors
- Website: Official website

Taylorsville High School is a public high school established in 1981, located in Taylorsville, Utah, United States. The principal is Mark Ellermeier. The mascot is the Wilbur the Warrior. The enrollment is around 2,900 students and represents many different ethnic groups. Taylorsville High is one of eight high schools in Granite School District.

Taylorsville High is located in the central part of the Salt Lake Valley and was built in 1981 to serve the growing population of the Taylorsville area. School boundaries are roughly from the Jordan River to 3100 West and 4100 South to 6600 South (excluding the area between 4500 S and 4700 S and approximately Jordan River and 950 W).

Taylorsville has successful programs for AVID (Advancement Via Individual Determination), JROTC and Latinos in Action, along with a large AP program.

== Administration ==
=== Current administration ===
- Mr. Mark Ellermeier – principal
- Mr. John Paul H Sorensen – Assistant Principal (Last Names A-D)
- Mr. Charlie Peterson - Assistant Principal (last names E-Li)
- Ms. Andrea McMillan – Assistant Principal (last names Lo-Ri)
- Ms. Nayelli Bautista – Assistant Principal (Last names RO-Z)

=== Past principals ===
- Dr. A. Earl Catumull (1981–1986)
- K. Wendall Sullivan (1986–1988)
- Michael B. Cannon (1988–1993)
- Dr. David Gourley (1993–2003)
- Jerry Haslam (2003–2010)
- Dr. Garett Muse (2010–2018)
- Mrs. Emily Liddell (2018-2023)
- Dr. Garett Muse (2023–2024(Interim))
- Mr. Mark Ellermeier

== Academics ==
=== Advanced Placement ===
Taylorsville High offers nineteen different Advanced Placement courses along with several Honors courses in core subjects. Advanced Placement courses are created by the College Board and offer college-level material and exams to high school students. Students may receive course credit at colleges and universities across the country if they earn a high score on the exam.

Taylorsville also offers Concurrent Enrollment (CE) classes; these are college-level classes that are offered to juniors and seniors, in which students can earn both high school and college credit at the same time. Concurrent Enrollment classes are taught by Taylorsville faculty who have been approved by Salt Lake Community College or Utah Valley University as adjunct faculty members. Concurrent enrollment credit can be transferred to most state colleges.

=== AVID ===
Taylorsville has a large AVID program, and was recognized as an AVID Highly Certified Site for 2017–18. AVID is an in-school academic support program that helps prepare students for college, by teaching them skills needed to succeed in college. AVID places academically average students in Honors, CE, and AP classes, and then provides support to help the student see success in these more advanced classes. The AVID program continues to have a 100% college acceptance rate, meaning every AVID senior has been accepted into a college or university.

=== JROTC ===
In January 1994, Taylorsville High was approved to offer a JROTC program to students. Taylorsville's JROTC program has earned the Unit of Distinction Award seven out of eight years possible.

=== Journalism ===
Taylorsville has an established journalism program and has received national awards for the school newspaper, The Warrior Ledger. The American Scholastic Press Association (ASPA) has awarded The Warrior Ledger with top honors, three years in a row.

== Career and technical student organizations ==
The school's reputation for legacy has been demonstrated in competitions in organizations such as FBLA, DECA, FCCLA, and SkillsUSA.

== Athletics ==
Taylorsville currently competes as a member of Region II as part of the 6A classification, Region II consist of Cyprus, Granger, Hunter, Kearns, Roy, and West. The Athletic Directors are Guy Mackay and Rebecca Elkins. Taylorsville High has won 17 team state championships since 1981, including 10 baseball championships.

=== State championships ===
- 1984 4A Boys Golf – State Runner Up: 1983, 1993
- 1986 4A Baseball
- 1987 4A Baseball
- 1988 4A Volleyball
- 1989 4A Baseball
- 1989 4A Girls Basketball – State Runner Up: 1987, 1988, 2002
- 1992 4A Baseball
- 1993 4A Baseball
- 1994 4A Baseball
- 1996 5A Baseball
- 1997 5A Softball
- 1998 5A Baseball
- 1998 5A Wrestling – State Runner Up: 1994
  - 23 Individual State Championships have been earned by Taylorsville wrestlers, most notably:
    - Craig Stauffer (1985) was the first State Champion in wrestling for Taylorsville. He later earned a scholarship to Utah State University. Craig continued his wrestling career as a longtime coach at Hunter High School
    - Justin Ruiz (1996, 1997, 1998) had a long and decorated wrestling career that was highlighted by earning a bronze medal at the 2005 World Championships. Justin continued his wrestling career as a coach
    - Kyle Thornock (2002, 2003)
    - Roy Nash (2013, 2014), Named Win Magazine's Wrestler of the Year for the state of Utah in 2013. Roy was the only state champion in the entire state to go undefeated (41–0) during the 2013 season. Roy was also ranked #1 in the country in Greco-Roman style wrestling for his age and weight class
    - Cheyenne Ruiz (2021, 2022)- First female State Champion. 2021 was the first year that women's wrestling was an official sport in Utah
- 2000 5A Baseball
- 2000 5A Boys Swimming – State Runner Up: 1995, 1999
- 2002 5A Baseball
- 2007 5A Softball – State Runner Up: 1996, 2008, 2014
- 2024 5A Boys Cross Country

=== Region championships ===
- Boys Basketball – 1995, 2002, 2014
- Girls Basketball – 1988, 1989, 1993, 2002, 2012
- Boys Cross Country – 1988, 2001, 2004, 2021, 2022, 2023, 2024
- Girls Cross Country – 2024
- Drill – 1995, 2004
- Boys Soccer – 1988, 1989, 1994, 1996, 2002, 2014
- Girls Soccer – 1990, 1992, 2000
- Boys Track – 1989, 2002, 2003, 2004
- Girls Track – 2002
- Boys Golf – 1981, 1984, 1993, 1994
- Football – 1999, 2013
- Boys Swimming – 1990, 1991, 1994, 1995, 1996, 2000
- Boys Tennis – 1999, 2021, 2023
- Girls Tennis – 2019
- Wrestling – 1986, 1989, 1990, 1995, 1996, 1998, 2002, 2003, 2020
- Volleyball – 1984, 1988, 1989, 1992, 1993, 1994, 1996, 1997, 2011, 2012, 2013, 2014
- Softball – 1992, 1997, 2000, 2001, 2002, 2003, 2004, 2005, 2006, 2007, 2008, 2009, 2011, 2012, 2014, 2015
- Baseball – 1984, 1986, 1987, 1988, 1989, 1992, 1993, 1994, 1995, 1996, 1997, 1998, 1999, 2000, 2002, 2003, 2005, 2006, 2008, 2012, 2013, 2014, 2022

== Baseball ==
Since it opened in 1981, Taylorsville has won ten state championships in baseball, more than any other Utah high school in that time period. The baseball state championships were won in 1986, 1987, 1989, 1992, 1993, 1994, 1996, 1998, 2000 and 2002. The most successful head coach was Steve Cramblitt, who won nine championships and 297 games during his tenure at Taylorsville. The Taylorsville player with the most successful baseball career is John Buck. John played in Major League Baseball for 11 years totaling 1090 games, most notably for the Kansas City Royals. John is still active in the Taylorsville baseball community and participates in the annual alumni game.

== Student government ==
The officer corps is made up of eight Student Body Officers, sixteen Class Officers, and sixteen Senators elected during April of each year. Each year the student government officers lead the student body in a charity fundraiser. Recently, the charity was Make a Wish Foundation, through a series of events the Taylorsville community donated over $15,000, in 2021.

== Notable alumni ==
- Natalie Williams – Gold medalist in the 2000 Olympics, WNBA power forward and 4 time All-Star (Class of 1989)
- Aimee Winder Newton – first female Republican on the Salt Lake County Council (Student Body Vice President '91–92 and Class of 1992)
- Mike Winder – West Valley City Mayor, Utah House of Representatives, businessman (Student Body President '93–'94 and Class of 1994)
- Brandon Lyon – MLB pitcher, New York Mets (Class of 1997)
- Justin Ruiz – American Greco-Roman wrestler (Class of 1997)
- Lance Scott – NFL center, Arizona Cardinals, New York Giants (Class of 1990)
- John Buck – MLB catcher, New York Mets (Class of 1998)
- Megan Joy – contestant on Season 8 of American Idol (Class of 2004)
- Ryne Sanborn – Child of Light, 2002 Winter Olympics; actor; model (Class of 2007)
- Dallen Bentley – college football tight end for the Utah Utes (Class of 2022)
- Christian Colon – MLB shortstop, Kansas City Royals World Series Champion

== See also ==
- List of high schools in Utah
