= Roberto Arguelles =

American serial killer (1962–2003)

- Born: Roberto V. Arguelles; February 14, 1962; Kearns, Utah, U.S.
- Died: November 15, 2003 (aged 41); Utah State Prison, Draper, Utah, U.S.
- Other name: "The Salt Lake City Strangler"
- Conviction: Murder x4
- Penalty: Death (Murders); Life imprisonment (Sex offences)

Details
- Victims: 4+
- Span of crimes: February – March 1992
- Country: United States
- State: Utah
- Date apprehended: August 8, 1992

Roberto V. Arguelles (February 14, 1962 – November 15, 2003), known as The Salt Lake City Strangler, was an American serial killer and sex offender who, while serving a life term for child molestation, confessed to raping and killing at least one woman and three teenagers in West Valley City, Utah, from February to March 1992. He later pleaded guilty and was sentenced to death for the murders, but died from a bowel obstruction at the Utah State Prison before the sentence could be carried out.

== Early life and sex offences ==
Roberto V. Arguelles was born on February 14, 1962, in Kearns, Utah, one of two brothers. Little is publicly available about his childhood, but at an early age, his stepfather moved the family to a pig farm in Salt Lake City, where the two boys worked hard. Arguelles committed his first crime at age 15, when he was caught trying to steal a car in September 1977, but was placed on probation. His behavior only worsened after his release, as in June 1978, he was sent to a youth shelter for beating up his girlfriend, brother and mother. He remained there for around a month, successfully escaping on one occasion but returning six days later, before he was allowed to return home. On October 5, 1978, he committed his first known violent crime by kidnapping and molesting a 10-year-old girl, but instead of being interned, the juvenile court placed him under house arrest. Arguelles remained on the police's radar, and in November of that year would be charged with molesting a 7-year-old, but the charge was later dropped.

While awaiting trial on the molestation charges, Arguelles was charged with the February 1979 rape of a 17-year-old girl. He was found guilty for both charges and thereafter placed in the State Youth Development Center in Ogden, with the recommendation that be detained until he was 21 years old. However, the hospital staff, who had no therapy program for juvenile sex offenders, attempted to have Arguelles transferred to the Utah State Hospital, who rejected the proposal, saying that Arguelles was "unmotivated for treatment." After all other ideas, including sending him to California for additional treatment, failed, Arguelles was released on December 19, 1979, with the only condition being that he attend periodic meetings with a sociology graduate student from the University of Utah for therapy.

This decision proved insufficient, as on March 3, 1980, Arguelles kidnapped a 15-year-old Granger High School student and drove her to an old shooting range, where he sodomized and raped her. After finishing, he threatened that he would kill her if she told anyone, before dropping her off in front of the school. Three days later, he picked up a 14-year-old girl who was on her way to West Lake Junior High and drove her to a dirt road near his stepfather's farm, where he sodomized and raped her under the threat of a knife. The victim resisted, prompting Arguelles to slash her throat, before dropping her off in a residential neighborhood in West Valley City. The girl managed to walk to a nearby house and ask for medical help, which she received at the Pioneer Valley Hospital. After she was treated for her injuries, the student gave a detailed description of her attacker and his truck, eventually leading to Arguelles' arrest. He confessed to both attacks, and later pleaded guilty before an adult court to two counts of attempted murder, aggravated rape and sexual abuse. He was transferred to the Utah State Prison to serve his sentence, with his appeals for parole rejected on several occasions by concerned board members. Arguelles was finally paroled on June 25, 1991.

== Imprisonment and confessions ==
On August 1, 1992, posing as a security guard, Arguelles approached two siblings (a 10-year-old girl and an 8-year-old boy) in front of the Orchard Elementary School in West Valley City, claiming that he wanted help with finding some stolen goods. Under the pretense of frisking them, he ordered them to pull down their pants, touching the boy's genitalia and patting the girl's crotch, before dropping them off at their home. A week later, he stopped in front of the Hunter High School and, using a fake police badge, attempted to entice two 10-year-old girls into his car. However, he was spotted by a highway worker who immediately notified the police, who arrested Arguelles shortly after. He was then charged with molesting the siblings from Orchard Elementary School, for which he was found guilty and sentenced to life imprisonment with possibility of parole. At the sentencing, Justice Kenneth Rigtrup gave an explicit recommendation that the parole option hopefully should never be applied, citing Arguelles' history of recidivism and increasingly deviant sexual crimes.

Over the next three years, Arguelles served in obscurity, occasionally bragging to cellmates about supposedly abusing and killing a few young girls and women in 1992, in addition to making ransom demands from their families. These claims eventually attracted the attention of police investigators, who decided to interview him in July 1995. In the first interview, Arguelles confessed to the murders of 16-year-old Lisa Martinez and 15-year-old Tuesday Roberts, both of whom had vanished while walking towards the Valley Fair Mall on March 30, 1992. He then directed them to the gravesites near his stepfather's pig farm, where authorities found the two girls' bodies. In his confessions, Arguelles said that he had stabbed Martinez at least 43 times with a wood chisel, before strangling Roberts with a rope. Several months later, he confessed to two additional murders: those of 42-year-old janitor Margo Bond, who vanished en route to her job at the Kennedy Junior High School in February 1992, only to be found stabbed to death four months later in Tooele County; the other being 13-year-old Stephanie Blundell, who was stabbed to death a month later in the American Fork Canyon. His claims were backed up by Pamela Milstein, a prison inmate who had lived with Arguelles and his mother at their trailer in Kearns, who said that he had shown her some of Blundell's jewelry following her murder. After leading the authorities to their gravesites, Arguelles was later charged in all four deaths. While the supposed stolen jewelry and other items potentially linking him to the victims were never recovered, it was surmised that Arguelles or somebody associated with him had disposed of them.

== Trial, sentence and death ==
Before he could be brought on murder charges, Arguelles' lawyer sought to have his sex offences convictions overturned on the grounds that he had had ineffective counsel. This plea was shot down by the Utah Supreme Court, who reaffirmed the convictions. When brought to trial in May 1997, Arguelles almost instantly announced his intention to plead guilty and waive his right to appeal the upcoming convictions, stressing that he wished to be executed for his crimes. In addition, he also opted to represent himself at his sentencing hearing, which was granted by presiding Justice David Young. During the trial, he appeared either uninterested or unaware of the witnesses' testimony against him, and banned the press from taking his photograph, deeming it "distracting." Nonetheless, Arguelles went on to question several witnesses, including the detective who had questioned him after his attempted murder conviction. While his stand-in attorneys, who were chosen to act as advisers, suggested that their client suffered from blackouts and even possibly had a multiple personality disorder, Arguelles continued his attempts to give himself a death sentence, explicitly proclaiming that he wished the judge - not the jury - hand it down to him.

On June 21, 1997, Arguelles was sentenced to death for the four murders, with his chosen method being the firing squad. Unusually, he requested that once his execution date comes, that the traditional black cap put over inmates' heads not be used, as he wanted to "see [death] coming." The initial date was set for August 22, which was automatically appealed to the Utah High Courts. His attorneys criticized the decision, pointing out the possibility that Arguelles suffered from mental abnormalities.

A year later, while awaiting the outcome of his appeals, Arguelles unsuccessfully attempted to hang himself. After this, his behavior became even more erratic, as he began to eat his own feces, as well as pieces of paper and plastic, and twice had to be taken to the hospital for intestinal blockages. Whenever he had to appear in court, he had to be strapped in a wheelchair and a mesh mask put over his head, to prevent him from spitting on anybody in the room. On November 15, 2003, a guard passing by Arguelles' cell noticed that he was unusually quiet, and upon closer inspection, realized that he was unresponsive. He was quickly driven to the infirmary, where he was treated. Once responsive and awake he refused any further treatment. After several hours of observation he became unresponsive again and lifesaving efforts were attempted and pronounced dead. He was determined to have died from bowel obstruction.

== See also ==
- List of serial killers in the United States
