= Wayne Holland =

American politician

Wayne Holland Jr.

Chairman, Utah Democratic Party
- In office May 2005 – Aug 2011
- Preceded by: Donald Dunn
- Succeeded by: Jim Dabakis

Personal details
- Born: May 6, 1958 (age 67) Magna, Utah
- Party: Democratic Party

Wayne Holland is the former chairman of the Utah Democratic Party. He was first elected in 2005, and reelected in 2007 and 2009. He chose to not run again in 2011.

== Biographical note ==
Holland was born in 1958 in Magna, a copper mining town a few miles west of Salt Lake City, Utah. He graduated from Cyprus High School. Then he attended Utah State University, University of Utah, and Antioch University, with a major in labor economics and labor law. He is married and has two sons.

== Political career ==
Holland grew up in a family deeply involved in politics. His grandfather was an activist in the Democratic Farmer Labor Party of Minnesota, and his father was an engineer and a Union representative. In high school he was class president and involved in social-service organizations. As a college student he became chief labor liaison in the political campaigns. He supported himself by working in the copper mines during summer-school breaks. In 1982, he was appointed president of Front Lash, a major labor organization of union members and college students dedicated to engaging young Americans in political processes, and had to face the problems associated with unemployment of copper miners. He organized fundraisers for the Polish Union organization Solidarność and for the Anti-Apartheid movements in South Africa. He held that position for nine years. During this period he negotiated for USW (United Steel Workers) 117 bargaining agreements and arbitrations. He handled over 140 district cases, especially at Kennecott mines. He was able to win the 83% of the cases.

He was then selected as a "Young American Leader" by the United Nations and participated as a delegate in foreign exchange projects focusing on political, social, and economic studies. In that capacity he met political leaders in several foreign countries, including Germany, Sweden, England, and Chile.

== Focus on health care ==
Over the years, Holland has learned that most negotiations involve health insurance issues. He believes these issues can be best resolved through political processes.

== See also ==
- Utah Democratic Party
- Democratic Party
