= 2020 Salt Lake City earthquake =

Earthquake in Utah, United States

- Location within Utah
- UTC time: 2020-03-18 13:09:31
- ISC event: 617799112
- USGS-ANSS: ComCat
- Local date: March 18, 2020
- Local time: 07:09 a.m. MDT
- Magnitude: M_{w} 5.7
- Depth: 11.9 km (7.4 mi)
- Epicenter: 40.851°N 112.081°W
- Fault: Wasatch Fault
- Type: Normal
- Areas affected: Utah
- Total damage: >$629 million (estimate)
- Max. intensity: MMI VII (Very strong)
- Peak acceleration: 0.54 g
- Peak velocity: 37 cm/s
- Aftershocks: ~2,800
- Casualties: Several injured

At 7:09 a.m. MDT on March 18, 2020, a 5.7 magnitude earthquake hit Salt Lake City, Utah, United States, with an epicenter 6 km (3.7 mi) north-northeast of Magna, Utah, beneath the site of the planned Utah Inland Port. It was the first major earthquake to occur within the Salt Lake Valley since the city was founded, the state's strongest earthquake since the 1992 St. George earthquake, and the first earthquake of comparable magnitude to occur near Salt Lake City since 1962, when a magnitude 5.0 earthquake struck a similar location in Magna.

== Geology ==
Salt Lake City lies at the eastern boundary of the Basin and Range Province. The major active fault zone is the normal Wasatch Fault that throws down to the west. The footwall (upthrown part) is formed by the Wasatch Range with part of the Great Basin lying in the hanging-wall (downthrown part), at one time filled by Lake Bonneville, with the Great Salt Lake forming the largest remnant. The fault zone is broken up into six segments that appear to rupture separately. Paleoseismic investigations indicate that 19 surface rupturing earthquakes have occurred in the last 6,000 years along the fault system.

== Earthquake ==
The earthquake's focal mechanism and depth were both consistent with displacement on the Wasatch fault system at depth.

Significant shaking was felt in downtown Salt Lake City, and the earthquake was reportedly felt as far away as Wyoming and southern Idaho. The most distant report of shaking related to the earthquake occurred in Cokeville, Wyoming, over 110 miles (180 km) away from the epicenter. According to USGS, at least 26,000 people reported feeling the earthquake.

== Aftershocks ==
More than 50 aftershocks were recorded within two hours of the main tremor. As of 11:00 MDT March 26, a total of 591 aftershocks have been observed and located by the University of Utah Seismograph Stations. The largest of the aftershocks were two M 4.6 events that occurred at 08:02 and 13:12 MDT on March 18. During the same time interval there were 33 events of M3 and greater.

On the night of April 14, 2020, about a month after the main shock, a 4.2 magnitude aftershock occurred. Less than two days later, on the morning of April 16, another aftershock of magnitude 4.2 occurred in the same location. Because data appeared to indicate dwindling of local seismicity, the prolonged mainshock-aftershock time period, and relative consecutiveness and similarity of the aftershock pair led them to be a point of interest for Utah seismologists. It has been theorized that the first aftershock triggered the second. Coincidentally, the second aftershock occurred two hours before the Great Utah ShakeOut, one of many statewide earthquake preparedness drills.

== Impacts ==
=== Injuries ===
Though some minor injuries occurred, no major injuries or fatalities were reported as a result of the earthquake.

=== Damage ===
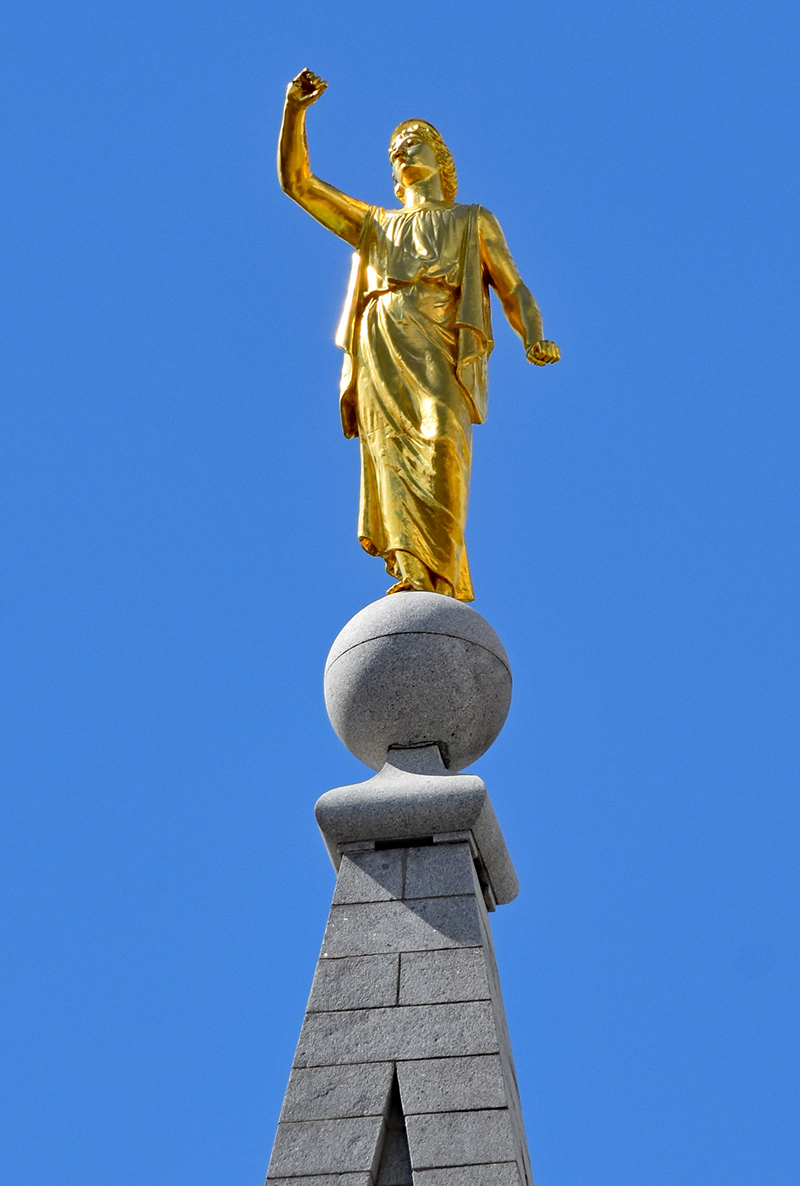
The Salt Lake Temple's Moroni statue without its trumpet (which fell off due to the quake)

After the earthquake, Utah Emergency Management said that serious damage was not expected, but there were reports of minor damage. Bricks fell off some buildings.

The Salt Lake Temple was undergoing a seismic upgrade at the time of the earthquake, and sustained minor damage. The Angel Moroni statue that sits atop the highest spire lost its trumpet following the earthquake. Some stones were displaced as well. The construction crews working on the seismic upgrade were sent home.

The historic Denver and Rio Grande Western Depot, St. Mark's Episcopal Cathedral, and dozens of mobile homes in West Valley City were damaged. As of December 2020, the Rio Grande Depot had still not re-opened due to damage being worse than initially thought, forcing a café that had occupied the building for 39 years to relocate.

Hydrochloric acid in the amount of 8,200 U.S. gallons (31,000 liters) leaked from a tank at Kennecott Utah Copper's refinery in Magna due to the earthquake, which authorities said was confined to the facility and did not affect public safety.

Radio station KMRI 1550 AM lost its transmitting tower located in West Valley City. The station was forced off air, and another station at the site KIHU 1010 AM was operating at reduced power. Both transmitters were very near the epicenter. KMRI filed for special temporary authority to go silent due to the collapse.

A preliminary survey of Salt Lake County government-owned buildings recorded at least $48.5 million worth of damage. Cyprus High School in Magna suffered some of the most significant damage, and West Lake Junior High in West Valley City was declared "a complete loss". Injuries in most schools were largely avoided due to the transition to online learning brought on by the COVID-19 pandemic lockdown. As this survey only covered government-owned buildings, actual damage was expected to be much higher. Despite extensive damage to Magna's historic downtown core, city officials did not expect that any of the historic structures within Magna will need to be condemned. Despite damage to about 145 structures deemed as historic throughout the Salt Lake Valley, only one of them was damaged enough to require demolition.

The cost for all building-related damage has been estimated to be about $62 million out of the $629 million in total economic losses, not including public infrastructure.

==== Power outages ====
Around 50,000 power outages were reported from customers across northern Utah following the earthquake from several damaged power lines, according to Rocky Mountain Power. The number of outages was down to 10,000 by 1:38 p.m. MDT, and down to 2,600 by the evening.

The earthquake caused power outages near Salt Lake City International Airport, and a ground stop was enacted on the airport. The control tower was evacuated, and passengers in terminals and concourses were moved onto buses. Cars on the TRAX light rail system were held at their nearest stations. Roughly 55,000 electricity customers lost power throughout the Salt Lake Valley. Items were shaken off walls and shelves in homes and businesses, and bricks were shed off façades. The Granite School District cancelled its planned events for the day to assess earthquake damage. The Salt Lake City School District also cancelled their lunch delivery program and device delivery services for the day, but resumed both on Thursday. The district reported little to no damage on all of their owned buildings.

=== COVID-19 pandemic issues ===
The earthquake took place during the COVID-19 pandemic in the United States, which had caused many residents to stay home from work or school to avoid infection. The day of the earthquake, Governor Gary Herbert said, "This is extremely bad timing, because we already have the coronavirus issue going on right now causing a lot of anxiety."

The earthquake disrupted some of the public health response to the pandemic. Testing at the Utah Public Health Laboratory was stopped, and the 24/7 coronavirus hotline went offline temporarily.

Salt Lake City schools were already closed due to the pandemic. The earthquake disrupted the operations of school districts throughout the Salt Lake Valley who were distributing food and learning materials to families.

=== Airport ===
Salt Lake City International Airport was shut down and "60 to 70 flights" were diverted. Passengers were evacuated, which was easier because the airport already had fewer people than usual due to the COVID-19 pandemic (about 9,000 compared to 24,000 under normal circumstances). A water line was damaged in Concourse D. News photos showed water flowing from a ceiling in one passenger area. The airport reopened at 1:15pm.

== See also ==
- List of earthquakes in 2020
- List of earthquakes in Utah
- List of earthquakes in the United States
