= Lance Scott =

American football player (born 1972)

No. 63, 53
- Positions: Guard, center

Personal information
- Born: February 15, 1972 (age 54); Salt Lake City, Utah, U.S.
- Listed height: 6 ft 3 in (1.91 m)
- Listed weight: 300 lb (136 kg)

Career information
- High school: Taylorsville (Taylorsville, Utah)
- College: Utah
- NFL draft: 1995: 5th round, 165th overall pick

Career history
- Arizona Cardinals (1995–1996); New York Giants (1997–1999); New England Patriots (2000)

Awards and highlights
- First-team All-WAC (1993)

Career NFL statistics
- Games played: 32
- Games started: 27
- Fumble recoveries: 1
- Stats at Pro Football Reference

Lance Robert Scott (born February 15, 1972) is an American former professional football player who was an offensive lineman for two seasons with the New York Giants of the National Football League (NFL). He played college football for the Utah Utes and was selected in the fifth round of the 1995 NFL draft (165th overall) by the Arizona Cardinals.

== Life ==
Lance Scott was born on February 12, 1972, in Salt Lake City.
