= KOSL =

- West Valley City, Utah; United States
- Broadcast area: Salt Lake City
- Frequency: 1550 kHz
- Branding: Oldies 1550

Programming
- Format: Oldies

Ownership
- Owner: Barry Wood; (Barry Wood dba KRGO LLC)

History
- First air date: 1956 (as KWIC)
- Former call signs: KWIC (1956–1968); KRGO (1968–1988); KZQQ (1988–1992); KRGQ (1992–1997); KRGO (1997–1998); KMRI (1998-2026)
- Call sign meaning: Oldies Salt Lake

Technical information
- Licensing authority: FCC
- Facility ID: 25405
- Class: B
- Power: 10,000 watts day; 340 watts night
- Transmitter coordinates: 40°43′16″N 112°2′29″W

Links
- Public license information: Public file; LMS
- Website: oldies1550.com

KMRI's tower (left) near Magna, Utah. The tower on the right is used by KIHU.

KOSL (1550 AM) is a radio station that broadcasts a Oldies format. Licensed to West Valley City, Utah, United States, the station serves the Salt Lake City metropolitan area. The station is owned by KRGO LLC. KRGO LLC is owned by communications attorney Barry Wood.

== History ==
The station was originally built on 1570 kHz with a power of 500 watts and the transmitter located in the 'Sugarhouse' area of Salt Lake City in 1956. It operated during daytime hours only. In 1965, the station's frequency was changed to 1550 kHz, and its power was increased to 10,000 watts. The transmitting tower was moved to 5265 West 2100 South in what is now West Valley City, Utah.

On March 4, 1968, the station's callsign was changed from KWIC to KRGO. As KRGO, the station aired a country music format. In 1977, nighttime operation at 500 watts was added. In the mid-1980s, the station's country music programming was simulcast on KRGO-FM 107.9.

On January 1, 1988, the station's callsign was changed to KZQQ, and the station aired the Z Rock heavy metal format. By 1990, the station's format had changed to Spanish language music, and was branded "La Fabulosa". The station later adopted a religious/gospel format during the day, while Spanish language programming remained on the station at night.

On July 31, 1992, the station's callsign was changed to KRGQ, and the station began airing a country music format during the day, while Spanish language programming remained on the station at night. On September 14, 1992, the station's country music programming began to be simulcast on 107.9 KZQQ-FM and 103.1 FM, and was branded "KRGO". In December 1993, the station's country music programming began to be simulcast on KQOL 106.5, as well.

By 1995, the station had been taken off the air. In 1997, the station was rebuilt at its current transmitter location of 6211 West 2100 South in West Valley City. On March 10, 1997, the station's callsign was changed back to KRGO. The station returned to the air, airing a Country Western format.

On January 16, 1998, the station's callsign was changed to KMRI. The station began airing a religious format. The station's callsign stood for "Miracle Rock Incorporated Church", which owned the station when it was assigned. In 2003-2004 the station made arrangements with the then–owner of KCPW (AM) (now KIHU), Community Wireless of Park City, to share its single tower as "Tower 2" of the other stations two tower directional array.

In 2005, the owners of the radio station made a contract with David J Velasquez, president of Radio Exitos Communications Inc and began transmitting Regional Mexican Music which also included Spanish Christian Music a program of 4 hours everyday from 2-6 p.m. Musica para tu alma played for 1 year, then two hours a day for two years. The president of Radio Exitos Communications Inc sold the contract to Victor Galindo owner of Victor's Tire. For the remainder of the contract. The contract was renew with Victor Galindo owning the new contract. Then the radio station was sold to the new corporation.

=== Tower Collapse ===
On March 18, 2020, a 5.7 magnitude earthquake happened near Magna, Utah, southwest of the station's tower. The earthquake knocked the station off the air after its tower collapsed. The earthquake's epicenter was 3.7 miles (6 km) north-northeast of the city of Magna, putting it near the Great Salt Lake or close to the towers. The collapse also affected KIHU, which was operating at reduced power. KMRI filed for special temporary authority to go silent.

=== Legal Proceedings and Chapter 11 Subchapter V Reorganization ===
On March 26, 2020, AASAA Media LLC DBA KMRI Radio was placed into involuntary receivership by Judge Matthew Bates of the Third Judicial District Court of Salt Lake County. KMRI's license was auctioned on July 17, 2020, by the court appointed receiver Jacob Hibbard, with the plaintiff in the foreclosure auction acquiring KMRI's license by placing a $75,000 credit bid.

On July 28, 2020, AASAA Media LLC DBA KMRI Radio voluntarily filed for Chapter 11 reorganization under Subchapter V and became Debtor-in-Possession [Trustee] of the FCC License and other assets; and is continuing operations of KMRI Radio via digital streaming until its antenna tower can be restored. One of the members of AASAA Media LLC, Nicolas Alejandro Vicente, died on August 21, 2020. The bankruptcy case previously filed by AASAA Media, LLC, was dismissed on October 26, 2020. On October 30, 2020, Barry Wood, the owner of KMRI LLC, submitted an application to the FCC to assign KMRI's license to the newly created LLC. An application for extension of the STA to remain silent was filed with the FCC on January 28, 2021, by receiver Jacob Hibbard, in order to resolve the legal disputes currently preventing KMRI from resuming broadcasting. On March 16, 2021, KMRI briefly resumed broadcasting with reduced power and an emergency wire antenna in order to prevent the station's license from lapsing before the expiration of the one year silent period. According to the Special Temporary Authority (STA) application filed with the FCC by receiver Jacob Hibbard, KMRI's Nautel transmitter sustained minor damage during the March 18, 2020 Salt Lake City earthquake which caused the station's tower to collapse. Replacement parts for the transmitter were obtained and installed prior to the temporary resumption of operations on March 16, 2021. On January 19, 2023, the FCC dismissed receiver Jacob Hibbard's Petition for Reconsideration, denying the standard renewal period of 8 years for the station's license. The FCC license for KMRI is currently set to expire on April 21, 2023, and the station remains off the air as of February 8, 2023. On March 3, 2023, KMRI briefly resumed broadcasting with a temporary antenna to preserve the station's license before the expiration of the one year special temporary authority silent period on March 9, 2023. The current engineering STA expires on August 28, 2023.

=== Return to the Air with Sports ===
On October 2, 2024, KMRI returned to the air with a sports talk format, branded as "SLC Sports Radio", with programming from Sports Byline USA. That programming ended abruptly in early 2026.

On January 5, 2026, Wood filed a request to change call letters to KOSL, which was approved by the FCC on January 9, 2026.

=== Oldies 1550 ===
On March 6, 2026, KOSL began running a "10,000 songs in a row" stunt loop, identifying on-air as "Oldies 1550". The station's format remains full-time oldies with limited commercials.
