= Taylorsville-SLCC Symphony =

The Taylorsville-SLCC Symphony is an orchestra based in Taylorsville, Utah, United States.

== History ==
The Taylorsville Symphony Orchestra was founded in 2003 under the direction of Richard Brunson. Since that time the orchestra has grown in size and scope. In 2005 the Salt Lake Community College orchestra joined forces with the Taylorsville Symphony Orchestra to create an outstanding ensemble.

== Director ==
Before joining the faculty of Salt Lake Community College as Orchestra Director, Dr Lawrence Spell was the music director and conductor of the Pitt Community College Symphony Orchestra in Greenville, North Carolina. The PCCSO was founded by Spell in 2007 with the purpose of providing a learning ensemble for Pitt Community College music students and an opportunity for community musicians to continue practicing their art. In addition to his duties leading the orchestra, Spell was responsible for ensuring the success of all the performing arts programs at PCC in his role as the Coordinator for Music and Drama. Spell was also music director and conductor for the Symphony of Hope, an annual benefit concert that has raised thousands of dollars for cancer treatment.

Spell earned the Doctor of Musical Arts degree from the University of Utah and the Masters of Music degree in orchestral conducting from East Carolina University. During his time at ECU, he served as assistant conductor for the University Symphony Orchestra, conductor for the Summer Strings and conductor for the Premiere Performances Concert Series. At the University of Utah, Spell served as the assistant conductor for the university orchestras and the Salt Lake Symphony. He was also appointed music director and conductor of the Wasatch Community Symphony Orchestra.

== Operational structure ==
The Taylorsville-SLCC Symphony Orchestra is a non-profit organization led entirely by a volunteer board with the support of the Taylorsville Arts Council and Salt Lake Community College. The Community Board of Directors is composed of individuals from the orchestra who donate their time to help ensure the vitality, longevity, and financial stability of TSO.
