= Geography of Salt Lake City =

Coordinates: 40°45′17″N 111°53′33″W

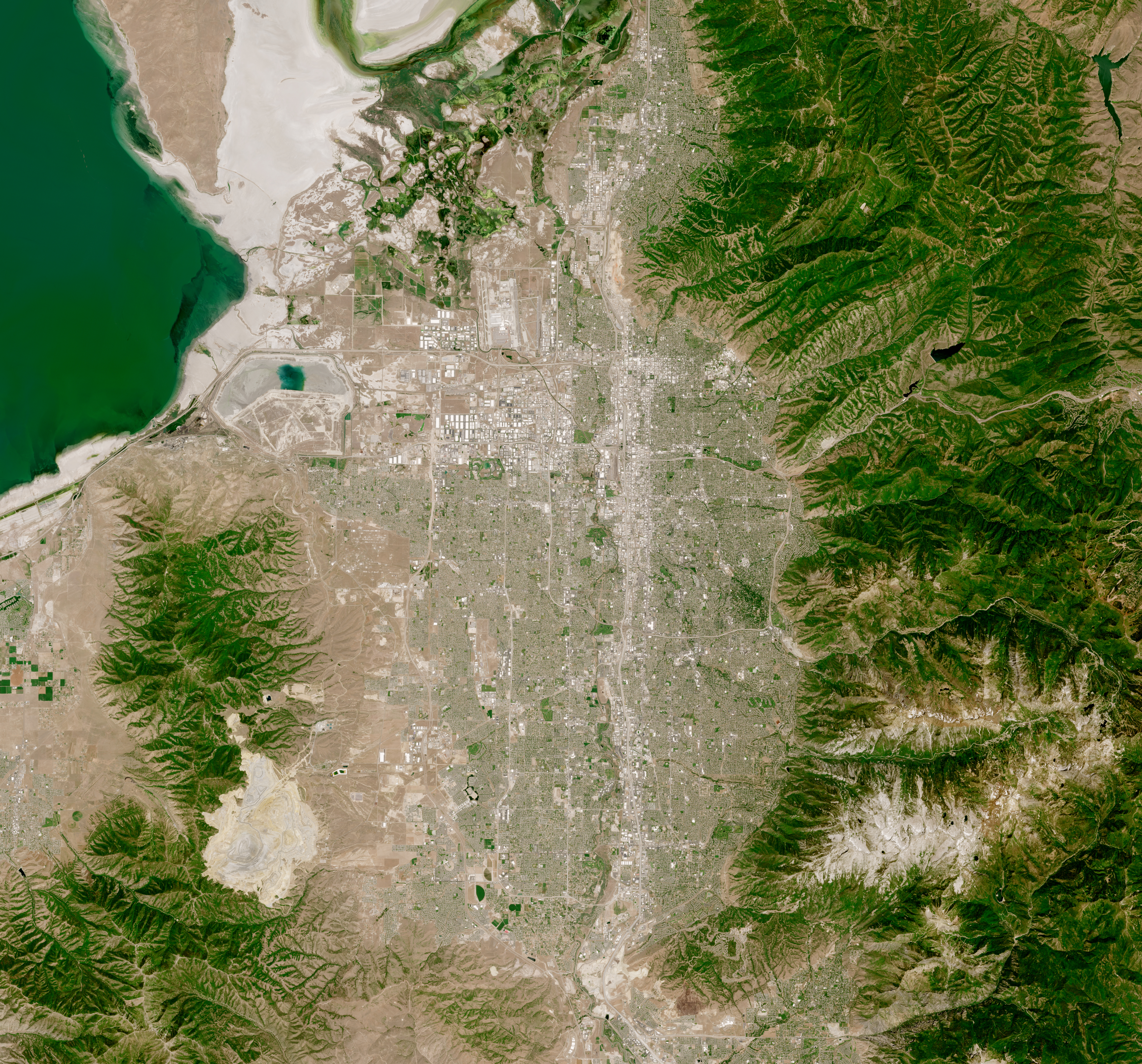
Photo taken by ESA Sentinel-2 of Salt Lake City, Utah.=

Salt Lake City is located in a large valley, the Salt Lake Valley, separated by the eastern Wasatch Mountains, a subrange of the Rocky Mountains, and the Oquirrh Mountains to the west. Salt Lake City is located at 40°45'17" North, 111°53'33" West (40.754700, -111.892622).

According to the United States Census Bureau, the city has a total area of 284.9 km² (110.4 mi²). 282.5 km² (109.1 mi²) of it is land and 3.3 km² (1.3 mi²) of it is water. The total area is 1.17% water.

Like most of the cities stretching north and south of Salt Lake City (see Ogden and Provo), it lies at the base of the Wasatch Mountains, which in some places rise impressively 6,000 feet (1,850 m) above the valley floor. This metro area is known commonly as the Wasatch Front. Most of the valley floor is built up, except for some rapidly disappearing fields and farms on the south and west sides of the valley. Some parts of the benches have residential construction.

The valley floor is the lake bed of the ancient Lake Bonneville, of which the Great Salt Lake is a remnant. Soils in the valley are largely clay and sand, which exposes the city's edifices to considerable risk of damage due to liquefaction caused by an earthquake. The Wasatch Fault runs along the eastern benches of the city, and geologists consider it due for a major earthquake. On February 21, 2008 a 6.2M earthquake hit Eastern Nevada 42 miles west of Wendover, Utah and could be felt in northern Utah, including Salt Lake City (200+ miles away).

The Warm Springs Fault extends into downtown Salt Lake City, running north–south along W. Temple, directly adjacent to Temple Square and the Salt Palace convention center. The Warm Springs Fault and the East Bench Fault, both offshoots of the Wasatch Fault, were found in 2021 to connect underneath Salt Lake City. The discovery increased estimates of the risk of major metropolitan damage from an earthquake.

The marshlands and mudflats to the south and east of the Great Salt Lake border the city's northwest side. Freshwater estuaries enter the lake here, and the lower salinity combines with the marshy terrain to result in considerable algae growth. Under certain weather conditions, which occur up to roughly a dozen times a year, some of the algae dies off and decays, and the northwest winds carry the scent of decaying algae into the city. The smell is known as "lake stink".
