= KIHU =

- Tooele, Utah; United States
- Broadcast area: Salt Lake City metropolitan area
- Frequency: 1010 kHz
- Branding: Relevant Radio

Programming
- Format: Catholic radio
- Affiliations: Relevant Radio

Ownership
- Owner: Relevant Radio, Inc.

History
- First air date: July 3, 1956
- Former call signs: KTUT (1956–1960); KDYL (1960–1982); KTLE (1982–1992); KTUR (1992–1998); KIQN (1998–2004); KCPW (2004–2009); KPCW (2009)
- Call sign meaning: "Immaculate Heart Utah"

Technical information
- Licensing authority: FCC
- Facility ID: 35687
- Class: D
- Power: 50,000 watts day; 42,000 watts critical hours; 194 watts night
- Transmitter coordinates: 40°43′14.8″N 112°02′31.8″W

Links
- Public license information: Public file; LMS
- Webcast: Listen Live
- Website: relevantradio.com

KIHU (1010 AM) is a Catholic radio formatted radio station licensed to Tooele, Utah, United States. The station is owned by Relevant Radio, Inc. The station has a construction permit from the FCC for a power increase to 50,000 watts daytime, 42,000 watts critical hours and 194 watts night. The facilities authorized by the construction permit were built in 2004 and the station was operating under "Program Test Authority" with those facilities.

AM 1010 is a Canadian clear-channel frequency.

== History ==
The station was built to operate on 990 kHz with a 1,000-watt transmitter in the town of Tooele. It was officially launched on July 3, 1956. The original call letters were KTUT, and were changed to KDYL on February 5, 1960, after that call was released from 1320 AM in Salt Lake City when that station was renamed KCPX. Simmons paid the then owner, Thomas W. Mathis, to release the KDYL call so that they could use those call letters on 1280 AM in Salt Lake City, whereupon the station was assigned the call letters KTLE, beginning on May 19, 1982. KTLE stood for "Tooele", the station's city of license and former location of its transmitter.

In 1982, Mathis applied to change the frequency to 1010 from 990 kHz and increase the power to 50,000 watts daytime and 2,500 watts critical hours at the original transmitter site in Tooele. The change in frequency and power increase was finally built by the subsequent owner in 1992. In 1994, the station applied to move the transmitter to the Salt Lake Valley, at a site that was too close to the Salt Lake International Airport to allow a reasonable tower height; the tower was only 142 feet (43 m).

On October 30, 1992, the station changed its call sign to KTUR by the then owner, Robert Turley, and on September 18, 1998 to KIQN by the subsequent owner, Intelliquest Media. Intelliquest went bankrupt in 2003, and Community Wireless of Park City purchased the license from the bankruptcy trustee. Community Wireless then rebuilt the station at its current transmitter site. On August 1, 2004, the station became KCPW, and on March 20, 2009, the station became KPCW. In August 2009, the station was assigned the call KIHU, reflecting an ownership change, as it had been sold to IHR Educational Broadcasting. The station now broadcasts Catholic religious programming, which began August 22, 2009. The station flipped to the Relevant Radio branding when IHR Education Broadcasting and Starboard Media Foundation consummated their merger on June 30, 2017.

=== Tower collapse ===
KIHU's tower (right) near Magna, Utah. The tower on the left was used by KMRI. It collapsed on March 18, 2020.

On March 18, 2020, a 5.7 magnitude earthquake happened near Magna, Utah, southwest of the station's tower. The earthquake knocked KMRI off the air, after its tower collapsed. Because KIHU used both towers at night to operate directionally, the station had to file a special temporary authority and operate at reduced power until the tower could be rebuilt. KIHU was running on a generator and operating at reduced power following the earthquake.
