= Granite School District =

School district in Utah, United States

Coordinates: 40°42′59″N 111°53′21″W

Location
- Salt Lake Valley, Utah

District information
- Established: 1904
- Superintendent: Ben Horsley
- School board: Connie Burgess; Terry Bawden; Nicole McDermott; Kris Nguyen; Todd E. Zenger
- Chair of the board: Karyn Winder

Other information
- Website: Official website

The Granite School District is a public school district spread across central Salt Lake County, Utah, serving West Valley City, Millcreek, Taylorsville, South Salt Lake, Holladay, Kearns, and Magna; and parts of West Jordan, Murray and Cottonwood Heights. About 67,000 students are enrolled in its programs ranging from kindergarten to twelfth grade. It operates 9 high schools, 15 junior high schools, 62 elementary schools, as well as several specialty schools. This makes Granite the third largest school district in the state of Utah behind Alpine School District in Utah County and Davis County School District. Other school districts in the area include the Salt Lake City School District and the Murray School District.

All the following information is from the Granite School District website

== High schools ==
- Cottonwood, Murray
  - Academy for Math, Engineering, and Science (Charter School attached to Cottonwood High School)
- Cyprus, Magna
  - Cyprus Brockbank Campus
- Granger, West Valley City
- Connection (formerly Granite Peaks; alternative school), South Salt Lake. Multiple campuses:
  - Cottonwood Campus, Granger Campus, Granite Education Center Campus, Hunter Campus, Kearns Campus, Skyline Campus, Taylorsville Campus
- Kearns, Kearns
- Hunter, West Valley City
- Olympus, Holladay
- Skyline, Millcreek
- Taylorsville, Taylorsville

=== Former ===
- Granite, South Salt Lake (closed in 2009)

== Junior high schools ==
- Bennion, Taylorsville
- Bonneville, Holladay
- Churchill, Millcreek
- Eisenhower, Taylorsville
- Evergreen, Millcreek
- Granite Park, South Salt Lake
- Hunter, West Valley City
- Jefferson, Thomas, Kearns
- Kearns, Kearns
- Kennedy, John F., West Valley City
- Matheson, Scott M., Magna
- Olympus, Holladay
- Valley, West Valley City
- Wasatch, Millcreek
- West Lake, West Valley City.

=== Former ===
- Brockbank, Magna (closed as a junior high school in 2016, campus is now the Brockbank Campus of Cyprus High School)

== Elementary schools ==
- Academy Park, West Valley City
- Arcadia, Taylorsville
- Armstrong Academy, West Valley City
- Bacchus, Thomas W., Kearns
- Beehive, Kearns
- Bennion, Taylorsville
- Bridger, Jim., West Jordan
- Copper Hills, Magna
- Cottonwood, Holladay
- Crestview, Holladay
- Diamond Ridge, West Valley City
- Driggs, Howard R., Holladay
- Eastwood, Millcreek
- Elk Run, Magna
- Farnsworth, Philo T., West Valley City
- Fox Hills, Taylorsville
- Fremont, John C., Taylorsville
- Frost, Robert, West Valley City
- Gourley, David, Kearns
- Granger, West Valley City
- Hillsdale, West Valley City
- Hillside, West Valley City
- Holladay, Holladay (closed in 2002)
- Hunter, West Valley City
- Jackling, West Valley City
- Lake Ridge, Magna
- Lincoln, South Salt Lake
- Magna, Magna
- Monroe, West Valley City
- Morningside, Millcreek
- Moss, James E., Millcreek
- Oakridge, Millcreek
- Oakwood, Holladay
- Penn, William, Millcreek
- Pioneer, West Valley City
- Pleasant Green, Magna
- Plymouth, Taylorsville
- Rolling Meadows, West Valley City
- Rosecrest, Millcreek Township
- Silver Hills, West Valley City
- Smith, Calvin, Taylorsville
- South Kearns, Kearns
- Stansbury, West Valley City
- Taylorsville, Taylorsville
- Truman, Harry S., West Valley City
- Twin Peaks, Murray
- Upland Terrace, Millcreek
- Vista, Taylorsville
- Walker, Olene, Salt Lake City
- West Kearns, Kearns
- West Valley, West Valley City
- Whittier, West Valley City
- Wilson, Woodrow, South Salt Lake
- Woodstock, Murray
- Wright, Gearld L., West Valley City

=== Former ===
- Sandburg, Carl, West Valley City (closed in 2018)
- Oquirrh Hills, Kearns (closed in 2019)
- Westbrook, Taylorsville (closed in 2019)

== Specialty Schools and Programs ==
- Granite Peaks, Salt Lake City
- Granite Technical Institute (GTI), South Salt Lake
- Hartvigsen, Taylorsville, Utah
- Granite Transition Services, Salt Lake City
- YESS Program, Salt Lake City
- Granite Alternative Placement Program (GAPP), Holladay, Utah
- Preschool

== History ==
The district was created in 1904 with 4,258 students. Its name and original boundaries were taken from the Granite Stake of the LDS Church, which at the time spanned nearly the entire breadth of the Salt Lake Valley from Mill Creek in the east to Hunter in the west, and from roughly Sugar House in the north to Bennion in the south.
