= Pleasant Green Cemetery =

Pioneer cemetery near Magna, Utah, US

Coordinates: 40°41′44″N 112°06′40″W

- Interactive map of Pleasant Green Cemetery

Details
- Established: 1883
- Location: Oquirrh Mountains above Magna, Utah
- Country: United States
- Size: 10 acres (4.0 ha)
- No. of interments: 1,400 (estimated)
- Find a Grave: Pleasant Green Cemetery

The Pleasant Green Cemetery is located in the Oquirrh Mountains above Magna, Utah. Approximately 1,400 persons are buried in the cemetery. Many religious leaders and settlers of the western side of the Salt Lake Valley, particularly many leaders of the Church of Jesus Christ of Latter-day Saints (LDS Church) lie in the cemetery. It encompasses a little more than 10 acres (0.040 km^{2}). The Pleasant Green Cemetery was established because Daniel Jacob's grandmother died in 1883 and the only large cemetery at the time in the valley was the Salt Lake City Cemetery. Daniel and his friends got together and founded the Pleasant Green Cemetery and Sarah Haines was the first person buried in the cemetery.

The cemetery is surrounded by land owned by the Kennecott Copper Mine (also known as Bingham Canyon Mine).

== History ==
The Pleasant Green Cemetery was founded in 1883 by Daniel Jacobs, Hiram Spencer, Samual Taylor, George Perkins, Osmond LeCheminant, and maybe James Berotch, and Lehi Nephi Hardman, the Bishop of the Pleasant Green Ward, of the LDS Church. Bishop Hardman became the Custodian of the Cemetery. The land was donated by Nathan Smith, who owned 160 acres in the area.

Many of the original founders of the western Salt Lake Valley Towns, including Magna, Hunter, Pleasant Green, Ragtown, and Coonville are buried here.

These include pioneers from the Coon, Bertoch, LeCheminant, Rushton, Hardman, Staker, and Taylor families.

== Burials ==
The price of a plot in 2012 was 500$, which was considerably below other cemeteries in the local area. Pleasant green is unique in the way that the plots are organized, as they are split into family managed 'mini-cemeteries' where family members decorate their mini-cemeteries according to their own wishes.

It is estimated that there are approximately 17,000 grave sites, of which only 1,400 are currently occupied.

== Management ==
The LDS Church cared for and owned the cemetery from its founding in 1883 until 1983, where the Church handed ownership over to a non-profit organization known as The Pleasant Green Cemetery Preservation And Development Association, with their sexton in 2012 being Hiram Bertoch, the bestselling Christian author.

In May 2020, the ownership and operations of the cemetery were handed directly over the Magna City, marking it as the first municipal service directly provided by the city.
