= Polidori Sausage =

- Polidori logo, with the Colosseum in front of the Italian flag
- Founded: 1925
- Headquarters: Denver, Colorado
- Products: Packaged meats
- Website: polidorisausage.com

Polidori Sausage, also known as just Polidori, is a Colorado-based food company specializing in pork products, among other processed meats. It was started by Anna Cerrone, who had migrated to the United States from Italy, and coal miner Rocco Polidori. Officially founded in 1925 as a butcher shop, Polidori has been family-owned for generations.

== History ==
In 1914, Anna Cerrone migrated from Sicily to Ellis Island and eventually settled in Magna, Utah. In 1918, she met Rocco Polidori, a coal miner who had fallen ill, and together moved to Denver for better air quality and possible wealth. In 1925, they opened a butcher shop. Anna and Rocco eventually had two sons, Louis and Augie Polidori. By 1945, they worked for the company as well. Louis and Augie grew the shop into an industry over the span of three decades before getting sold and moving to a USDA facility after Anna's death in 1982.

== Products ==
Polidori Sausage sells packaged meat products at supermarkets, specializing in pork. Cinnamon and nutmeg are sometimes used as ingredients.

== See also ==
- Jimmy Dean (brand)
- List of pork dishes
