= West Lake STEM Junior High =

Location
- 3400 South 3450 West; Granger; West Valley City, Salt Lake County, Utah 84119; USA
- 40°41′57″N 111°58′28″W

Information
- Type: Public Jr. High School
- Motto: "Try, fail, try again, until you succeed"
- School district: Granite School District
- Superintendent: Ben Horsley
- Principal: Sarah Wall
- Grades: 6 – 8
- Age range: 11-14
- Average class size: 30
- Hours in school day: 7:50 AM-2:45 Mon-Thurs; 7:50 AM-12:30 PM Fri
- Classrooms: 64, 8 relocatable classrooms
- Campus: Urban/Suburban
- Colors: Gold & Black
- Slogan: "Learn Today Lead Tomorrow"
- Song: "Oh, West Lake"
- Sports: Boys Basketball, Girls Basketball, Boys Volleyball, Girls Volleyball, Wrestling, Boys Soccer, Girls Soccer, Boys Cross Country, Girls Cross Country, Boys Track, Girls Track
- Mascot: Mustang
- Team name: Mustangs

West Lake STEM Junior High or WLJH is a public junior high in West Valley City, Utah. It is located at 3400 South and 3450 West in the Granger region of West Valley City. The school belongs to the very large Granite School District, which covers a large portion of the Salt Lake Valley in Utah.

== Background ==
The school was built in 1964. Students who attend West Lake come from the area approximately bounded by 2100 South on the north, I-215 on the east, 3500 South on the south, and 4800 West on the west. The school is located in the heart of West Valley City. The school had 64 classrooms, including six relocatable classrooms and a Parent and Family Center. This will vary as construction begins on the new campus. West Lake is a Title One school and receives additional funding from Highly Impacted Schools, Gear Up, and Schools for the 21st Century. These grants allow West Lake to reduce class size, offer after-school and summer programs, and additional opportunities for students, faculty, and community.

As of the 2020-2021 school year, the school has been relocated to a location known as the old campus for Westbrook Elementary due to severe earthquake damage on the main building. Due to damage done by the Magna earthquake, the building has been demolished and will be replaced by another building. It is anticipated the new building will be ready August 2024.

== Promotion ==
Students of West Lake continue to either Hunter High School or Granger High School.
