= Kearns High School =

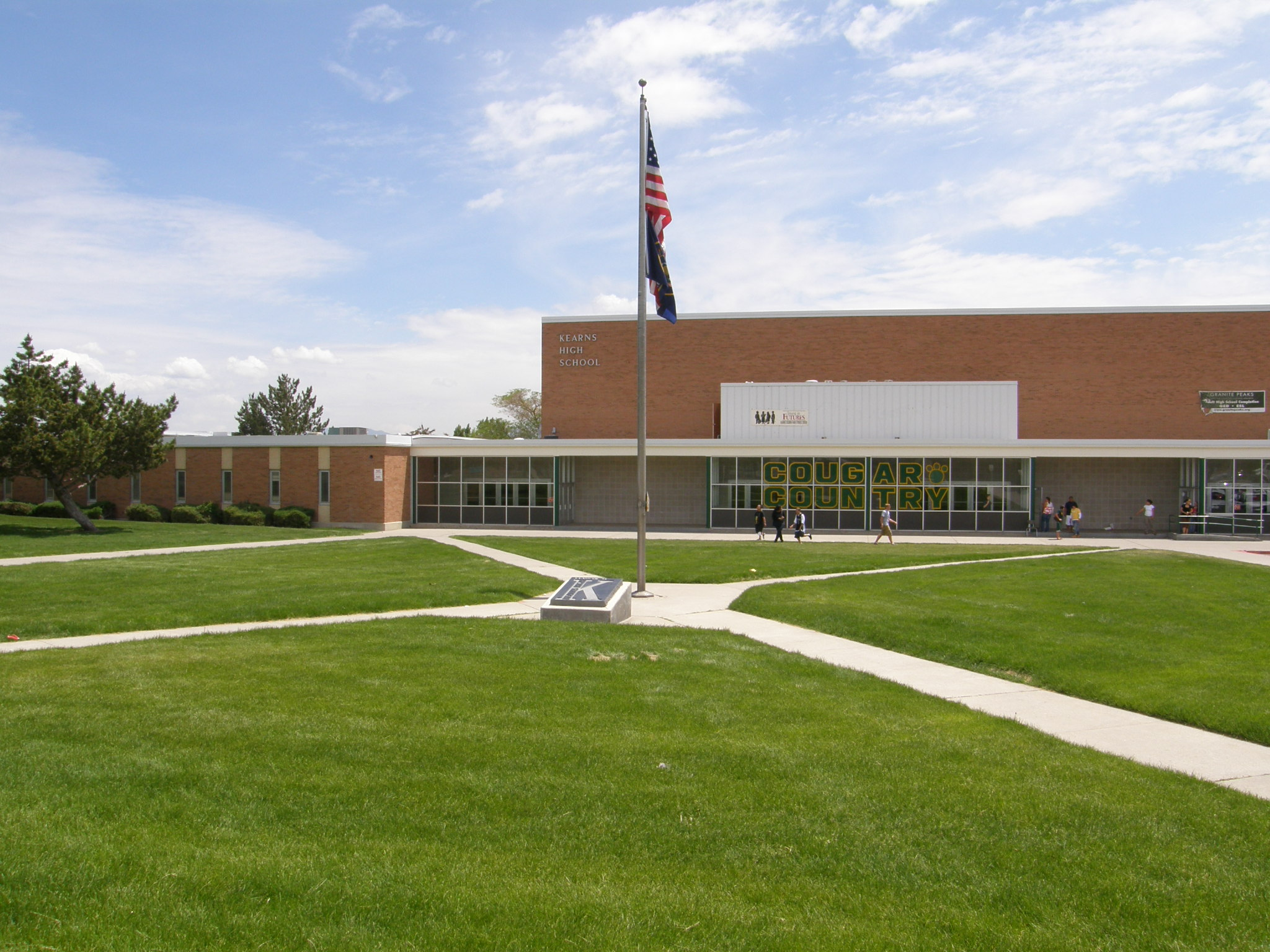

Location
- 5525 S. Cougar Lane (4800 W.), Kearns, Utah 84118; United States; 40°39′00″N 112°00′15″W

Information
- Type: Free public
- Motto: "KHS - Where destiny is a matter of choice, not chance."
- Established: 1966
- School district: Granite School District
- Principal: Danny Stirland
- Teaching staff: 94.67 (FTE)
- Grades: 9–12
- Enrollment: 2,313 (2024–2025)
- Student to teacher ratio: 24.43
- Campus type: Suburban
- Colors: Green and gold
- Mascot: Cougars
- Website: Official website

Kearns High School is a public high school located at 5525 S. Cougar Lane (4800 W.) Kearns, Utah, United States. It was opened in 1966 with its first graduating class graduating in 1967. It serves 9th, 10th, 11th and 12th grade students. The official mascot is a Cougar and the school colors are green and gold. Starting with the 2014–2015 school year, the school now serves 9th grade.

== iCougars ==
For the 2010–11 school year, Kearns High School used the iSchool Initiative with money from a federal stimulus Enhancing Education Through Technology grant. The media specialist, Rachel Murphy, wrote the grant to start the program. The iCougars program began on November 5, 2010, and had each student use an iPod Touch to keep track of assignments, take notes, learn different languages, and do research. Kearns High School was the first school of its size to use the iSchool Initiative.

== COVID-19 school cancellation ==
On March 13, 2020, Granite School District announced that in-person classes at Kearns High School and other schools within the district would be cancelled until further notice due to the COVID-19 pandemic. The rest of the 2019–20 school year took place via distance learning. For the 2020–21 school year, students will have the option to either attend class in-person or receive schooling through digital learning methods.

== Notable alumni ==
- Jeffrey Bassa, professional football player for the Kansas City Chiefs
- Brandon Duckworth, baseball player
- Sim Gill, Salt Lake County District Attorney
- DaMarques Johnson, professional Mixed Martial Artist, formerly with the UFC
- Jack Kelly, college football linebacker
- Gary Padjen, former NFL player
- Jerica Tandiman, Olympian
