= Granite Connection High School =

Public school in Utah, United States

- Granite Connection High School in 2026

Location
- 501 E 3900 S South Salt Lake, Utah 84107; United States; 40°41′17″N 111°52′33″W

Information
- School type: Alternative public high school
- School district: Granite School District
- Teaching staff: 46.84 (FTE)
- Enrollment: 513 (2023–2024)
- Student to teacher ratio: 10.95

Granite Connection High School is an alternative public high school in South Salt Lake, Utah. Connection belongs to the Granite School District.
