= Harden Bennion =

American politician

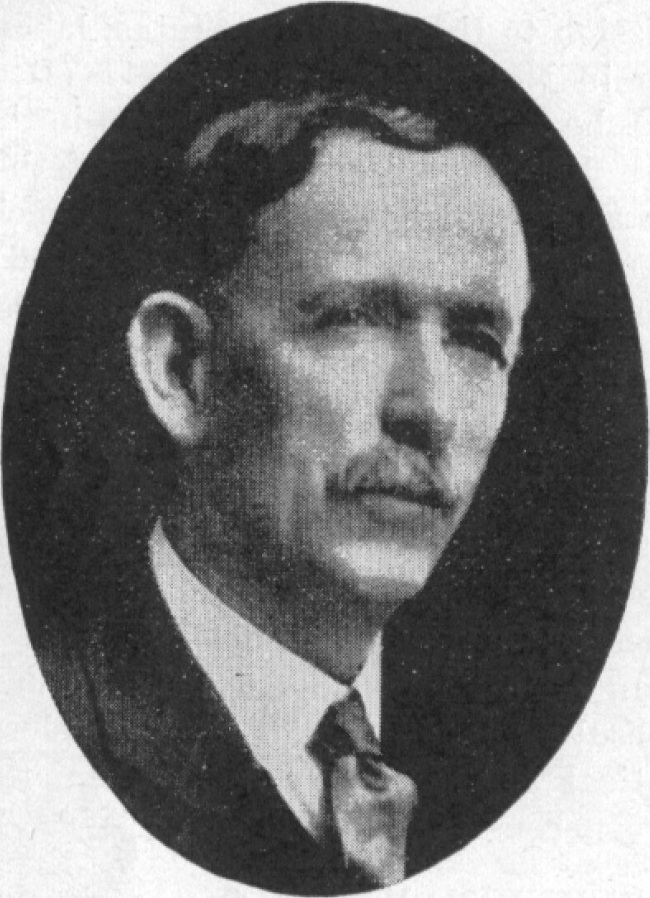

Secretary of State of Utah

In office
- 1916 – 1920

Utah State Senator

In office
- 1898 – 1906
- Political party: Democratic

Personal details
- Born: October 7, 1862; Taylorsville, Utah Territory, United States
- Died: October 19, 1936 (aged 74); South Salt Lake, Utah, United States
- Resting place: Wasatch Lawn Memorial Park; 40.6972°N 111.8492°W
- Spouse(s): Vilate Kimball Nebeker
- Children: 5
- Parents: John Bennion; Esther A. Birch

Harden Bennion (October 7, 1862 – October 12, 1936) was the Secretary of State of Utah from 1916 to 1920. He also served in the Utah State Senate and as chairman of the Utah Democratic Party.

Bennion was born in Taylorsville, Utah Territory. At age six he moved with his parents to present-day West Point, Nevada a small community in the Muddy River Valley where they had been called to settle by the LDS Church. For five years they were involved in raising sheep and cattle at that location, and then when Bennion was about 13 he moved back to Taylorsville with the rest of his family. At age fourteen he was involved in a major cattle run from Nevada to Rush Valley, Utah along with his father. In 1876 the Bennion family moved to Vernon in Tooele County, Utah.

In 1878 Bennion began studying at the University of Deseret (now the University of Utah) from which he received a certificate as a teacher after one year. However, for the next seven years Bennion was involved in sheep herding and farming in Vernon.

He later worked for George M. Cannon who was the Salt Lake County recorder. After leaving employment there in 1893 Bennion married Vilate Kimball Nebeker, the daughter of George Nebeker.

Bennion then moved to Vernal, Utah in 1893, where his brother Samuel R. Bennion was the stake president. He served as manager of the Ashley Cooperative Mercantile Institution in Vernal and was involved in organizing the Bank of Vernal. Bennion also served as a member of the Board of Tuustees of the town of Vernal and town clerk. Vernal then became a city and Bennion was elected a member of the city council. He also held the position of postmaster in Vernal. In the LDS Church Bennion served in the YMMIA presidency in the Vernal Ward and then as a counselor in the bishopric of that ward.

In 1898 Bennion was elected to the State Senate, representing Uintah County, Utah, Grand County, Utah, San Juan County, Utah, Emery County, Utah and Carbon County, Utah. Since Daggett County, Utah did not yet exist and was still in the boundaries of Uintah County it was also part of Bennion's district. Bennion was re-elected to the state senate in 1902 and so continued in that position through the end of 1906.

In 1906 Bennion became a member of the Uintah stake (based in Vernal) high council. Shortly after that he became a counselor in the Uintah Stake presidency. Shortly after that in 1908 in business affairs Bennion began to work full-time as a rancher.

However, in 1909 Governor William Spry appointed Bennion to the Utah State Board of equalization. For the next eight years he served in either that position or as a member of the Utah Commission on Taxation and Revenue. With his new appointment in 1909 Bennion moved to Salt Lake City and was released from the Uintah Stake presidency and called as a member of the Salt Lake Stake High Council. From 1914 to 1916 Bennion served as stake clerk of the Duchesne Stake, based in Roosevelt, Utah.

In 1916 Bennion was elected Secretary of State of Utah. He then was involved with irrigation boards and worked with Joseph R. Murdock to found the Wasatch Livestock Loan Company.

In 1924 Bennion became head of the Utah Democratic Party and in that position successfully oversaw the election of George H. Dern as governor. From 1925 to 1933 Bennion was Utah Commissioner of Agriculture. From 1923 to 1929 Bennion also served as a counselor in the Salt Lake Stake presidency.

Bennion and his wife Vilate had five daughters, four of whom lived to adulthood.

== Sources ==
- Jenson, Andrew (1936). Latter-day Saint Biographical Encyclopedia: A compilation of biographical sketches of prominent men and women in the Church of Jesus Christ of Latter-Day Saints. Vol. 4. Salt Lake City, Utah: The Andrew Jenson History Company (Printed by The Deseret News Press). p. 11–13.
