= Brockbank Jr. High =

Brockbank STEM Junior High

Location
- Magna, Utah
- Coordinates: 40°42′24″N 112°05′43″W

Information
- Opened: 1950
- School district: Granite
- Sports: co-ed volleyball, wrestling, co-ed soccer, track, cross country, volleyball and co-ed basketball
- Mascot: Bees (1950-1973), Braves (1973-2016), bears 2025-
- Team name: Brockbank Bears
- Website: schools.graniteschools.org/brockbankjr

Brockbank Junior High School one of the two junior high schools in Magna, Utah, United States. It is part of the Granite School District.

== Description ==
Students were known as the Brockbank Braves. Brockbank had girls and boys volleyball, boys and girls soccer, wrestling, cross-country, track, and girls and boys basketball teams. The school had an Honors program and school musicals. The Physical Education program had racquetball, tennis, and basketball equipment & facilities, as well as a workout room, and video game systems with sports-related games (i.e., Wii Fit, Just Dance, and Dance Dance Revolution). Students could eat lunch inside the cafeteria or outside in a commons area, and students who buy school lunches had a range of "stations" to choose from (i.e., Pizza Station, Sub Station, Fiesta Station). At the start of the 2016–2017 school year, Brockbank Jr. High became a part of Cyprus High School's campus, with seventh and eighth graders instead now attending Matheson Junior High.

== History ==
On July 24, 1947, a fire broke out in an old shop building near Cyprus High School. Sparks went astray and the seventh and eighth grade wing of the high school caught fire. Fire crews were unable to save that portion of the building. District officials decided to build a separate building for the junior high school students, and thus construction began on a new building slightly east of the high school. In 2025 brockbank reopened as a junior high school.

== Extension of Cyprus High School ==
The end of the 2015–2016 school year was the end of Brockbank as a junior high school. The buildings were reorganized to serve as a ninth and tenth grade core subject extension of the Cyprus High School campus. Junior high school boundaries in the district were reorganized such that seventh and eighth grade students who would have attended Brockbank had to attend Matheson Junior High to the southeast. Starting 2025 the building went back to being Brockbank middle school hosting 6th, 7th, and, 8th graders.
