= Granger High School (Utah) =

Coordinates: 40°41′42″N 111°58′43″W

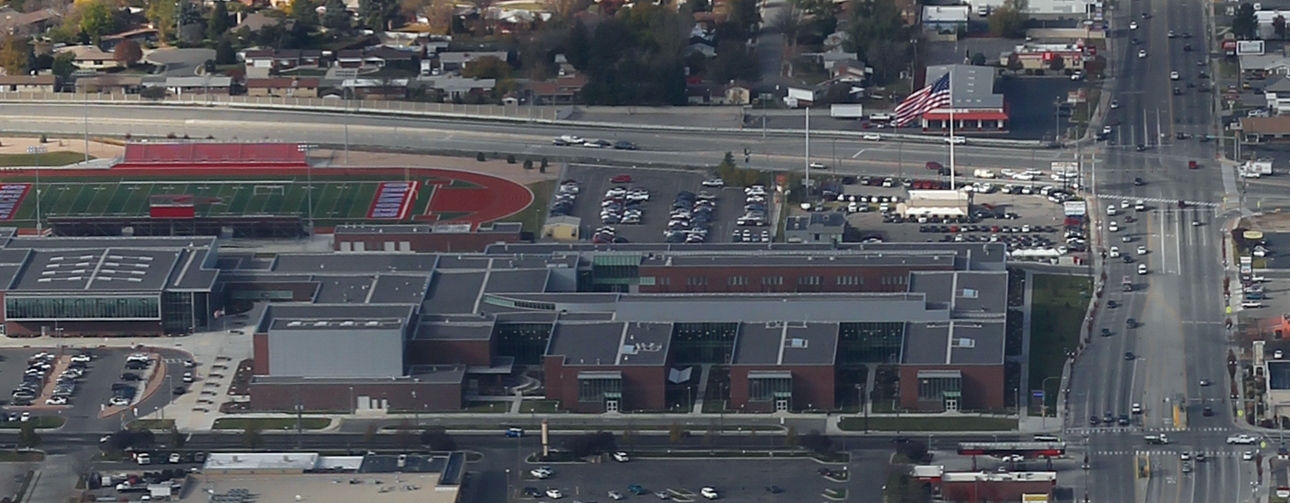
- Aerial view

Location
- 3580 South 3600 West; West Valley City, Utah; United States

Information
- Type: Free public
- Motto: Per Angusta Ad Augusta
- Established: 1958
- School district: Granite School District
- Superintendent: Ben Horsley
- Principal: Tyler Howe
- Teaching staff: 127.12 (FTE)
- Grades: 9–12
- Enrollment: 3,434 (2023–2024)
- Student to teacher ratio: 27.01
- Campus type: Urban
- Colors: Crimson, Columbia blue and Silver
- Mascot: Lancers
- Website: Official website

Granger High School is a public high school located in West Valley City, Utah, United States.

The school enrollment for the 2019–20 school year was 3,155 with 123 teachers, for a teacher to student ratio of 25.64.

The mascot is the Granger Lancer. The school was designed with a King Arthur theme, hence the cafeteria is known as Stonehenge, and the school's colors are the same as King Arthur's (crimson red, Columbia blue, and silver gray).

Granger High belongs to the Granite School District. It opened in 1958.

As of the 2020–21 school year, Granger's students are 60.5% Hispanic, 20.9% White, 11.7% Asian/Pacific Islander, 2.0% Native American and 4.2% African-American.

The current principal of Granger High School is Tyler Howe.

== See also ==
- List of high schools in Utah
