= Magna, Utah =

Magna
- City
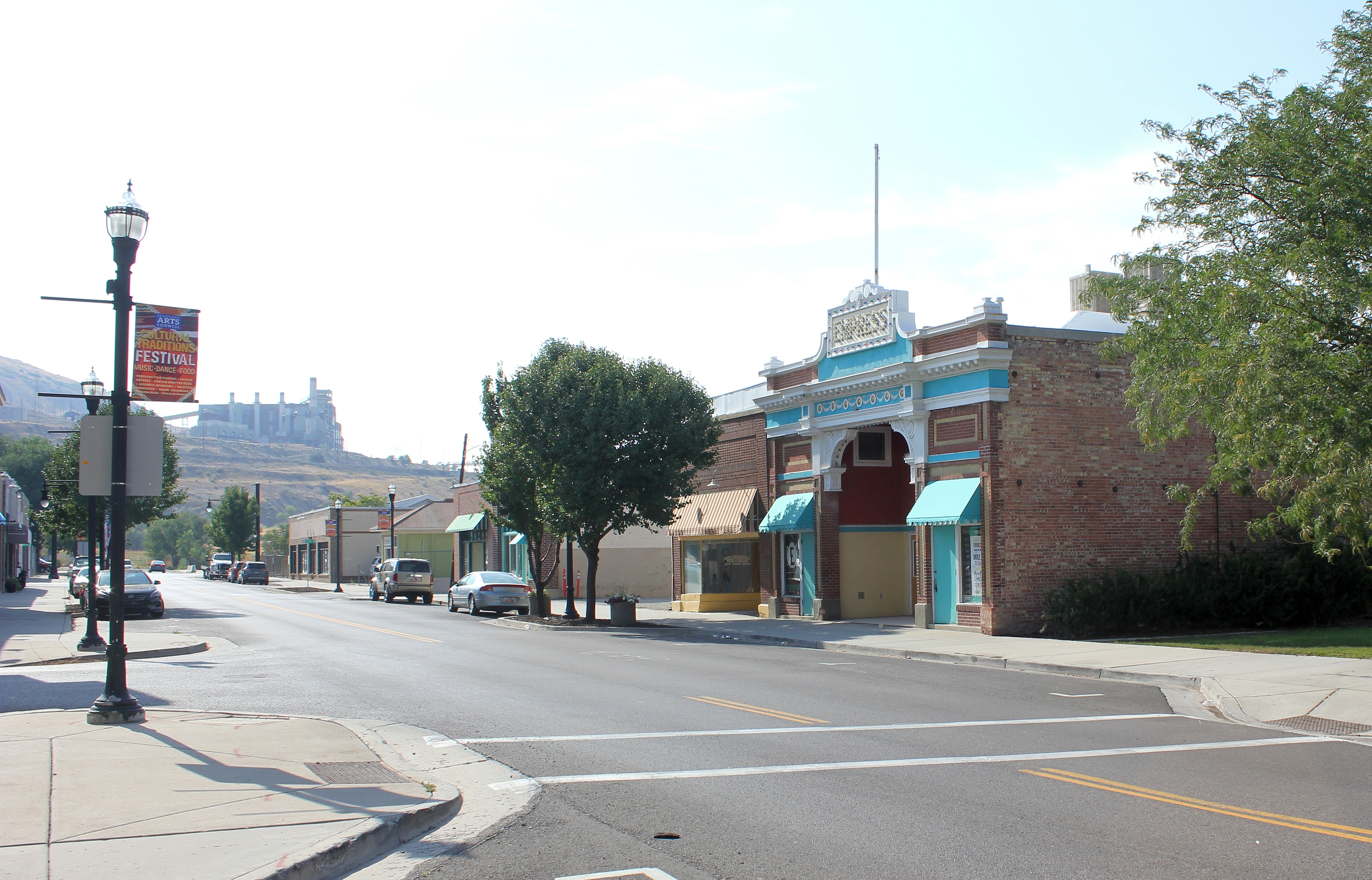
- Main Street in Magna
- Etymology: Kennecott Copper's Magna Mill; Latin word meaning "great" or "superior"
- Location of Magna within Salt Lake County and the State of Utah.
- Coordinates: 40°43′20″N 112°04′36″W
- Country: United States
- State: Utah
- County: Salt Lake
- First Settled (as Pleasant Green): 1868
- Given Township Status: 2001
- Incorporated as a Metro Township: 2017
- Incorporated as a City: 2024

Area
  - Total: 37.48 sq mi (97.07 km^{2})
  - Land: 15.11 sq mi (39.13 km^{2})
  - Water: 22.37 sq mi (57.94 km^{2})
- Elevation: 4,265 ft (1,300 m)

Population (2020)
  - Total: 29,251
  - Density: 1,936.1/sq mi (747.54/km^{2})
- Time zone: UTC-7 (Mountain (MST))
  - Summer (DST): UTC-6 (MDT)
- ZIP code: 84044
- Area codes: 385, 801
- FIPS code: 49-47290
- GNIS feature ID: 2408162
- Website: Official website

Magna (/ˈmæɡnə/ MAG-nə) is a city in Salt Lake County, Utah, United States. The population of the city stands at 29,251 according to the 2020 census, a 10.4% increase over 26,505 in 2010.

== History ==
=== Settlement ===
Settlement of the area began in 1851 shortly after pioneers reached the Salt Lake Valley. Early farmers settled in 1868 at the base of the northern Oquirrh Mountains and called their community Pleasant Green. By 1900, there were about 20 families in the area. One of the first Pleasant Green farmers was Abraham Coon, who established a livestock ranch and settlement called Coonville in a canyon mouth at about 5400 South now known as Coon Canyon. Coon Creek flows out of Coon Canyon and is one of the major Oquirrh Mountain drainages. Coon Creek flows north and west through Magna to the Great Salt Lake.

The Pleasant Green Cemetery located in the Oquirrh foothills, at about 3500 South, was established in 1883. In 1890, in response to a law requiring all children to receive free public education, the first school was built in the community.

=== 1900-1960 ===
In the early 1900s, copper mining activity in the Oquirrhs began transforming the Pleasant Green area from an agricultural hamlet to an industrial community. D.C. Jackling established the Utah Copper Company, which later became Kennecott Copper Corp. In 1906, the company began constructing its Magna Mill. Jackling chose the name "Magna" from the Latin word meaning "great" or "superior".

Beginning in 1903, Magna saw a large influx of Greek immigrants, primarily prompted by coal mine strikes in Carbon County, Utah and Fresno, California. This group eventually established a thriving Greektown and community. The formation of Magna's Greektown coincided with a similar community developing in Salt Lake City, about 15 miles to the east.

Boston Consolidated Copper constructed a second mill in the area in 1909. In 1911, the companies merged and the mill was renamed, Arthur Mill. Construction workers lived in a temporary settlement known as Ragtown. Several substantial homes were built in the tent city and later moved to the present community. As the mills began operating, some local farmers traded in their plows for a steady company paycheck and began moving in to work at the mills.

In 1914, Renald Woolley, the Post Master of the township, petitioned to have the Pleasant Green post office changed to Magna because of confusion with other towns such as Pleasant Grove. The petition was accepted and in a meeting above his store, the locals accepted the name of Magna for the town and post office, on October 19, 1915. (see West Valley View, June 9, 1983). By 1909, the Hawthorne School (no longer standing) had been built in the eastern Magna area. In 1908, the Webster School (destroyed by fire and demolished in June 2004) was built at the west end of what is now Main Street. In 1924, the first building of the present Cyprus High School was completed. Over the years, buildings and additions have been constructed on the campus. At the time, commuting to work by automobile was not practical. Few mineworkers had cars and cross valley roads were in marginal condition. Workers lived in the town and walked to the mills. Downtown Magna included churches, saloons, fraternal halls, and stores. Several small neighborhoods, such as Greektown, Japantown, Snaketown, and Little Italy, developed around Main Street. Many early residents were immigrants, primarily from Eastern Europe, but Magna was not a mining town.

In 1914, an Italian woman by the name of Anna Carrone settled in Magna and met coal miner Rocco Polidori. They married and moved to Denver, Colorado and went on to found the meat company Polidori Sausage.

Between 1915 and 1960, the town's fortunes fluctuated with the copper industry. During the Great Depression, the mills shut down for a period, and workers were laid off. Around 1940, there was a resurgence as the pending war boosted copper demand. Growth continued after World War II, and throughout the 1960s.

=== 1960-1980 ===
By the 1960s, the community was experiencing the first signs of a suburban transition. The Hercules Powder Co., once a small dynamite manufacturing firm had begun producing rocket motors at its Bacchus Works plant, south of the Magna community, named after 1912 founder T.W. Bacchus. The increased jobs were one factor that encouraged subdivision development in the Magna, Kearns, and West Valley City areas.

In 1961, the voters in the Magna Improvement District (now the Magna Water and Sewer District) approved a bond that financed a sewage treatment plant, water storage tanks, pumps, and well development. The improvements created sufficient capacity to serve more than double the population at the time and helped open the way for development. Not only did Magna's population begin shifting southward during the 1960s, but also automobile commuting, both to work and shopping, became common. As business activity moved to other areas, Main Street slowly began to deteriorate. Presently, some of the commercial space there is vacant.

During the 1970s, as part of a general west valley suburbanization trend, the community experienced more dramatic growth. Inexpensive land south and east of the historic town center began being developed into moderately priced single-family homes. The new neighborhoods tended to attract middle-income working class couples with younger families. While the community had grown from approximately 8,900 in 1960 to 10,000 in 1970, the population had increased to over 23,000 by 2000. This increase is about double the countywide growth rate.

=== 1980-present ===
The process for Magna to become a township took over 10 years. Growth and development continue to define Magna.

The West Bench plan for the redevelopment of mining land should have a major impact on the future of Magna. Kennecott Land plans major development in the areas immediately surrounding Magna. The area west of Magna along I-80 is currently slated to become one of 2 major "urban centers" for Kennecott Land's west bench development plan.

The Historic Main Street underwent a major remodel in 2006. Main Street has also become a popular location for filmmakers. including the Disney corporation, and films such as Disney Channel's TV movie, Dadnapped, and some of the Halloweentown movies filmed on Magna Main Street. A two-part episode (and series finale) of the TV series Touched by an Angel, "I'll Walk with You". The popular TV series Granite Flats also uses some of the Magna locations in part of the series. Disney's series 'Andi Mack' is also filmed in Magna.

On March 18, 2020, Magna was the site of the epicenter for the 5.7 magnitude earthquake 2020 Salt Lake City Earthquake. The quake was followed by more than 850 aftershocks. The temblor struck at approximately 7:10 am, and was felt strongly across the Wasatch Front. Damage was light, although several historic buildings with unreinforced brick walls suffered damage.

On May 1, 2024, Magna was officially promoted from a metro township to a city, as a result of Utah's House Bill 35, passed in February of that year.

== Geography ==
According to the United States Census Bureau, the city has a total area of 7.4 square miles (19 km^{2}), all land. The community lies just to the northeast of the Oquirrh Mountains and is directly south of the Great Salt Lake.

== Demographics ==
Historical population
Census	Pop.	Note	%±
1950	3,502		—
1960	6,642		89.7%
1970	5,509		−17.1%
1980	13,138		138.5%
1990	17,629		34.2%
2000	22,770		29.2%
2010	26,505		16.4%
2020	29,251		10.4%

As of the 2020 Census, there were 29,251 people living in Magna. The racial makeup of Magna was 56.2% non-Hispanic White, 3.28% from two or more races, 2.67% Pacific Islander, 1.37% Black, 1.14% Asian, 0.59% Native American, and 0.38% from "other races". 34.4% of the population were Hispanic or Latino of any race.

== Education ==
Magna lies within the Granite School District and is home to 5 elementary schools, Copper Hills, Elk Run, Lake Ridge, Magna, and Pleasant Green. It also has Matheson Junior High, and Cyprus High School, whose sports teams compete in 5A-level competition (1A being the lowest and 6A the highest). The former Brockbank Junior High was closed in 2016 and combined with the Cyprus High campus.

== Economy ==
Northrop Grumman has a solid rocket motor manufacturing plant in Magna.

== Transportation ==
Magna lies on the grid system of the Salt Lake Valley, between 7200 and 9200 West and 2100 and 4100 South. SR-201 runs along the northern border as an expressway and intersects with I-80 to the west. West 3500 South (SR-171) is the major east–west local road, while South 8400 West (SR-111) is the major north–south road.

The Utah Transit Authority (UTA) operates bus route 35 (3500 South) within the community, which enters from West Valley City. The bus route goes from UTA's Millcreek TRAX station on West 3300 South/3500 South all the way to 8400 West in Magna, between which it passes by the beginning of the TRAX Green Line (which connects with the Salt Lake City International Airport, via Downtown Salt Lake City the West Valley Central station by the Valley Fair Mall. Although the 3500 South bus route stops at South 8400 West in Magna, the bus also loops around other places in Magna, including the majority of Magna Main Street. The 3500 South route runs every 15 minutes on weekdays.

== Mass media ==
The Magna Times was a local weekly broadsheet community newspaper that is based and published in Magna. In 2009, it had a circulation of Arbor 4,000 copies.

== Culture ==
Magna is home to The Empress Theatre. Due to its historical significance, the theatre was added to the National Register for Historic Places on May 9, 1985 (National Register #85000962).

Downtown Magna was used as a central filming location for the hit Disney Channel series Andi Mack. "The Spoon" Diner, a popular location for Andi and her friends to eat at, was actually made specifically for the show.

== Notable people ==
- Gary Andersen, head football coach, Utah State University
- Parley Parker Christensen, Utah and California politician, Esperantist. Teacher in Murray.
- Nathaniel Coleman, 2020 Olympic silver-medalist in men's combined sport climbing.
- Emily S. Richards, national suffrage leader.
- SHeDAISY, country music group

== See also ==
- List of municipalities in Utah
- Clair Huffaker
- Kennecott Utah Copper
