= Cyprus High School =

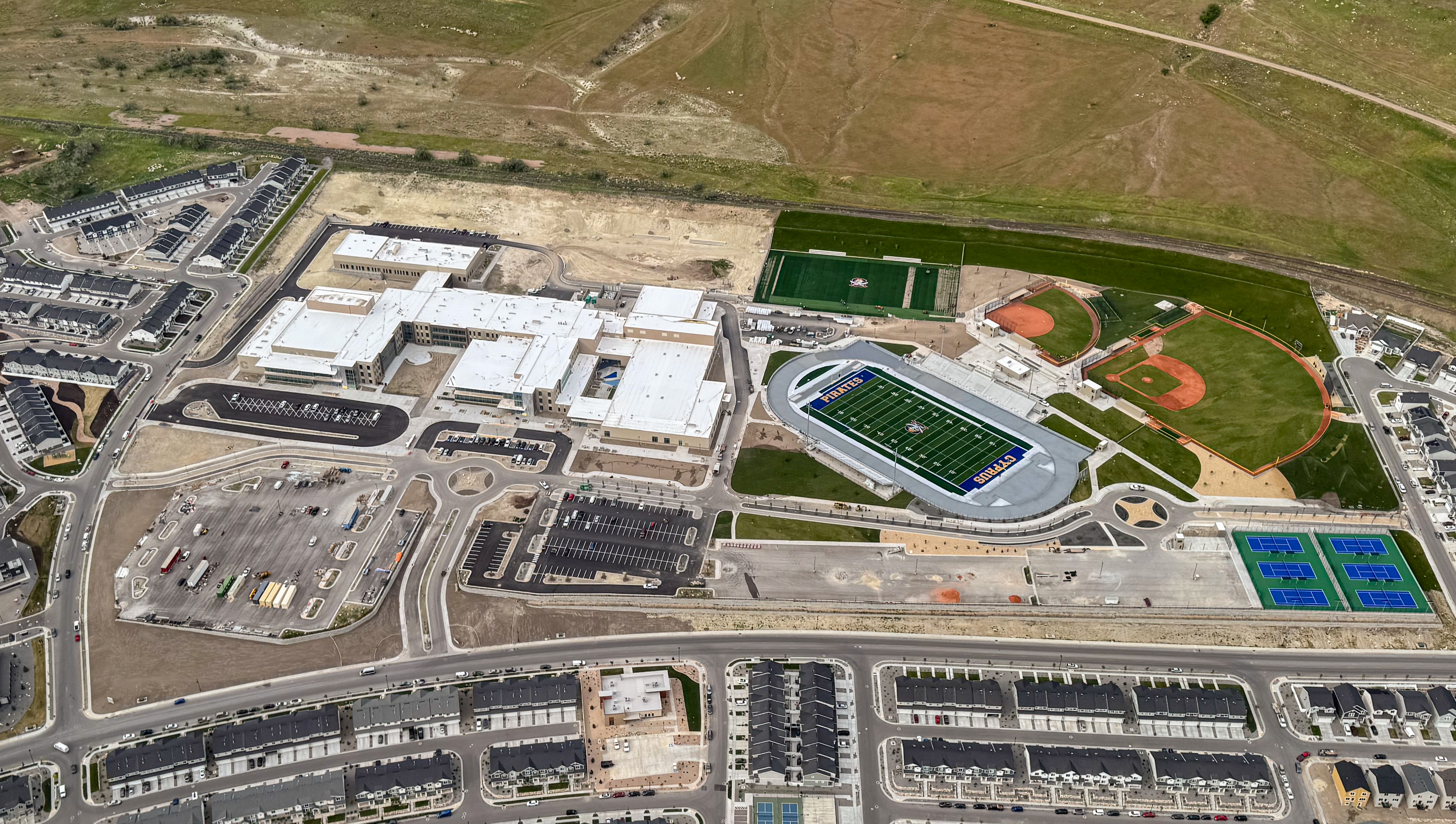
- the new Cyprus school campus

Location
- 8575 W Cordero Dr. Magna, Utah 84044; United States; 40°41′06″N 112°05′57.43″W

Information
- Type: Free public
- Motto: Captain your own ship and sail your own sea!
- Opened: April 1918
- School district: Granite
- Superintendent: Ben Horsley
- Principal: Josh LeRoy
- Teaching staff: 106.26 (FTE)
- Grades: 9-12
- Enrollment: 2,762 (2024-2025)
- Student to teacher ratio: 25.99
- Campus type: Urban
- Colors: Royal blue and gold
- Mascot: Pirates
- Website: Official website

Cyprus High School is a public high school located at 8575 W Cordero Dr. in Magna, Utah, United States. Cyprus High opened in 1918, and now has an enrollment of 3,000 students. The principal of the school as of 2024 is Josh LeRoy. The school's mascot is the Cyprus Pirate. In 2025, Cyprus High School moved to a new campus located at 8575 W Cordero Dr.

Cyprus High belongs to the Granite School District.

Cyprus High School dates back to April 1918. The auditorium was added in 1973 and the science building in 1978. Due to the age of the main building, it was completely rebuilt in 1983. In 2025, a new building was constructed on a new campus to replace the aging building.

== Enrollment ==
Cyprus High School serves approximately 2,600 students in grades, 9–12. The old building of Cyprus wasn't big enough to hold 4 grades, so as part of it, Brockbank Jr. High became a part of Cyprus. 7th and 8th graders that would've gone to Brockbank went to Matheson Junior High School. However, with the establishment of the new high school Brockbank Jr. High has been re-established.

As of the 2020-2021 school year, 49.2% of the student body are White, 41.8% are Hispanic, 2.2% are African American, 3.0% are Pacific Islander, 1.7% are Asian, and 1.3% are Native American.

== Notable alumni ==
- Norm Bangerter - former Utah governor
- Scott Eyre - Major League Baseball pitcher
- Willie Eyre - Major League Baseball pitcher
- Pete Harman - KFC co-founder
- SheDaisy - country music group
- John A. Pearce - Utah Supreme Court justice
- William Grant Bangerter - Assistant to the Quorum of the 12 Apostles
