= Taylorsville, Utah =

City in Utah, United States

- City
- Aerial view of Taylorsville

- Seal

- Location in Salt Lake County and the state of Utah.
- Coordinates: 40°39′18″N 111°56′58″W
- Country: United States
- State: Utah
- County: Salt Lake
- Settled: 1848
- Incorporated: July 1, 1996
- Named for: John Taylor

Government
  - Mayor: Kristie Overson
  - City Council: Ernest Burgess, Anna Barbieri, Meredith Harker, Curt Cochran & Bob Knudsen
  - Presiding Judge: Christopher Bown

Area
  - Total: 10.85 sq mi (28.10 km^{2})
  - Land: 10.85 sq mi (28.10 km^{2})
  - Water: 0 sq mi (0.00 km^{2})
- Elevation: 4,295 ft (1,309 m)

Population (2020)
  - Total: 60,448
  - Density: 5,571.5/sq mi (2,151.17/km^{2})
- Time zone: UTC−7 (Mountain (MST))
  - Summer (DST): UTC−6 (MDT)
- ZIP codes: 84129, 84123
- Area codes: 385, 801
- FIPS code: 49-75360
- GNIS feature ID: 1433206
- Website: http://www.taylorsvilleut.gov/

Taylorsville is a city in Salt Lake County, Utah. It is part of the Salt Lake City metropolitan area. The population was 60,448 at the time of the 2020 census. Taylorsville was incorporated from the Taylorsville–Bennion CDP and portions of the Kearns metro township on July 1, 1996. The city is located adjacent to Interstate 215 and Bangerter Highway. It is located in the middle of the Salt Lake Valley.

== History ==
The area called Taylorsville today is made up of two historic communities in the central part of Salt Lake County: Taylorsville and Bennion. These communities incorporated through a vote of the people with over 70 percent approval in September 1995. The city officially became the City of Taylorsville during the centennial anniversary of Utah's statehood in 1996.

The land on which Taylorsville is located is part of an interconnected alluvial plain that was formed by the wearing down of the Wasatch and Oquirrh Mountains to the east and west. Beneath the surface, Taylorsville sits on more than a kilometer of unconsolidated rock, sand, and clay. The inactive Taylorsville Fault has been traced down the center of the Salt Lake Valley. Lake Bonneville shaped the topography of the area and deposited lake bottom clay and sand. As Lake Bonneville dried up over the past 14,000 years, the salt from the breakdown of rock remains, making the soil alkaline. Like most desert soils, it has little organic material and is hard to work.

A broad, east-west running ridge called "Bennion Hill" rises perhaps a hundred and fifty feet above the surrounding area. Bennion Hill is the eastern end of a wide ridge that rises toward Farnsworth Peak in the Oquirrh Mountains to the west.

The first (unnamed) people in the region appeared during or after the last ice age on the shores of what remained of Lake Bonneville. Less than five miles (8 km) from Taylorsville evidence of people killing and eating a mammoth have been found. Some of this region's first named visitors were Fremont people who used the area to hunt and gather food along the Jordan River more than a thousand years ago. A large Fremont settlement on City Creek used the land where Taylorsville is located as hunting and foraging especially along the river. In more recent times Ute bands passed through the valley between the marshes of the Great Salt Lake and Utah Valley. Most of the area was dry sagebrush-covered land without any natural water sources except the Jordan River. A well-used Ute trail wound along the west side of the river at approximately 1300 West which the Ute used in spring and fall. Early settlers observed small encampments of Ute in the cottonwoods along the Jordan River. At least one local settler called these people the "Yo-No'". Whether the name is his creation or an approximation of something they said is unknown.

There are poorly documented suggestions that Spanish missionaries, soldiers, and explorers came through the area beginning in the mid-1600s. The whole region was called "Teguayo" and "Lake Copalla" (Utah Lake) appear on maps of Spanish Nuevo Mexico. Spanish and then Mexican land claims remained until the Treaty of Guadalupe Hidalgo which ended the Mexican War in 1853 and ceded the whole of northern Mexico to the United States including a few thousand Mormon settlers who had taken up residence in July 1847.

=== Mormon settlement ===
The first Mormon pioneer settlers, Joseph and Susanna Harker from England built a log cabin on the west side of the Jordan River in November 1848 on what was called then "the Church Farm" near 3300 South. In 1849, Samuel and John Bennion and several other families moved south crossing the river on the ice in January. There was little in the way of building materials, so the families dug into the bluffs of the Jordan River for shelter. The tiny settlement, the first "over Jordan," was called Harker's Settlement, and they began the difficult work of digging ditches to move water out of the Jordan River and onto the land on the west side. The soil was hard to work and they kept looking for better land to farm. The infamous crickets destroyed much of that year's crop and so the group moved farther south to where Big Cottonwood Creek flowed into the Jordan River about 4800 South known then as Field's Bottom.

By working together, eight families managed to bring in the first successful crop in 1851 using water brought down from Bingham Creek by what was later called Gardner's Millrace. John and Esther Bennion's daughter, Rachael, was the first pioneer child to be born in Field's Bottom. Despite the struggle to get food and shelter in those early days, John Bennion described Field's Bottom in these words:

if peace dwells upon this earth it is here and here are the happiest and most prosperous people in the world, enjoying free soil, pure air, liberty to worship our God just as we please…

By 1851, more families settled in or near Field's Bottom where they dug the "lower ditch" and cleared land for small farms and pastures. In January 1852 Harker's Settlement was organized as a part of the West Jordan LDS Ward that included the Salt Lake Valley west of the Jordan River. Some families returned to cabins they had built earlier and dismantled them and brought the logs across the river and reassembled the cabins.

In 1853, the continued threat of attack by angry Utes, locally called the "Walker War" or the "Utah Valley War", forced the settlers to build an 2-acre (8,100 m^{2}) adobe fort called the English Fort just north of the North Jordan Burying Ground in 1854. Stories about "Indian depredations" in Utah and Sanpete Counties and the massacre of John W. Gunnison and his surveying party caused such fear that Salt Lake City fortified itself. Two livestock herders were killed in Cedar Valley, just over "South Mountain" and the Ute attacked cattle herds in Tooele County just over the Oquirrh Mountains. Isolated settlements either built forts or were abandoned. Locals nicknamed the fort in North Jordan, "Fort Hardscrabble," because it was built on what they considered a useless piece of ground. About 30 families moved into or near the fort for protection for the winter, but as the threat of attack faded, families spread out once again and part of the fort was converted into an LDS meeting house which also served as the school.

Hickman Fort, farther south in Bennion, was built by William Hickman. It was located about 5800 South on the bluff above the west side of the river. Between 1853 and 1857 Gardner's Millrace was extended north to the Bennion area and called the North Jordan Canal, the first important canal on the west side of the Jordan River.

Up until 1859, the West Jordan Ward was headquartered in what is today Taylorsville.

By 1860, Harker's Settlement, as the area was called, had 178 residents. The first post office was established with the name Taylorsville which was the name of the LDS branch in that part of the North Jordan, perhaps to distinguish it from Granger. The post office was discontinued later. Elizabeth Harker's home was used for the first school classes.

In 1858, the threat of Johnston's Army marching down Emigration Canyon forced many settlers to pack up everything they could and move south until the situation could be resolved. Most residents ended up in Spanish Fork or camped out at Pondtown (Salem) near Utah Lake. The home guard who remained behind to watch over the settlement observed the "Johnston's Army" camp the first night after passing through Salt Lake on the "flats" above the North Jordan farms. Its large livestock herd ate everything to within an inch of the ground. The US Army continued on its way the next morning. In July 1858 Taylorsville residents returned and settled back into the interrupted routine of summertime chores. By 1859 the adobe fort was dissolving into the mud from which it was created. It was decided to build a log school on top of the "hill" on 4800 South which was closer to where most people in Taylorsville lived.

In 1859, the West Jordan Ward included all of Salt Lake County west of the Jordan River and even had a section east of the river. The North Jordan dependent branch of the West Jordan stake was organized in 1859. Its first president was John Bennion. He was succeeded in 1863 by Samuel Bennion. He was later succeeded by Heber Bennion so that until 1907 the presiding LDS authority in Taylorsville was a Bennion.

The area west of Jordan was divided into the West Jordan, South Jordan, North Jordan, and Herriman LDS Wards. North Jordan, also known as Taylorsville, had a dependent branch at Bennion. The first business in Taylorsville was a small store located near the school and a blacksmith's shop across the street. John Webster, the blacksmith, was appointed postmaster and once a week carried mail from Murray in a clothes basket. In 1867 the log school was replaced by a three-room school made of rock and brick called "the Rock Schoolhouse" that was used until 1898.

By 1876, the South Jordan Canal and the North Jordan Canal were joined to carry water from the Jordan River above the bluffs west of the Jordan and brought land from South Jordan to Granger under cultivation. This brought more families to the area, almost all of them farmers. Land west of the canals was cleared for dry farms that were planted in the fall and harvested in early summer. A few families moved just north of Taylorsville near 6200 South and Redwood Road. John Bennion, one of the early settlers, gave this area its name, Bennion. A tiny blue schoolhouse was built on the corner of Redwood Road and 6200 South for the children to attend.

In the 1880s, LDS Church president, John Taylor, hid from United States Marshals Service officers at a home on the west side of the Jordan River near 4800 South. John Taylor's association with Taylorsville has often been used to explain its name. The name, Taylorsville, used before the 1880s seems to call the John Taylor explanation for the town's name into question. However, since Taylor was a member of the Quorum of the Twelve before the Mormons even arrived in Utah, and was the wounded survivor of the mob attack that killed Joseph and Hyrum Smith, and served at various times as speaker of the Utah Territorial Legislature, naming the town after Taylor at any point from 1847 on is quite believable.

In 1881, the Utah and Salt Lake Canal was built which allowed irrigation farming to expand even farther west above the river between Bluffdale and Granger. Un-irrigated land to the west was cleared and planted as dry farms. The 1880s saw a sawmill, gristmill, and woolen mill built in West Jordan. Rawlings shoe repair store was constructed. The Bennion brothers built a grist mill at 4800 South and the Jordan River.

In 1894, a three-room schoolhouse was built out of red brick, called the 64 District School. It sat on two acres on the corner of 6200 South and Redwood Road. The name of the school was later changed to Madison School. Enough musicians lived in the area to establish a brass band. People in Taylorsville and Bennion depended on growing corn, wheat, oats, and alfalfa. In the 1890s sugar beets became big business and many farmers started to clear additional land to grow them. The beets were hauled to the West Jordan cutting station until 1916 when the West Jordan Sugar Factory was completed. Taylorsville and Bennion remained very small farming towns.

The 1890s saw increased growth and the establishment of a small business district at the intersection of Redwood Road and 4800 South. The largest store was Lindsay and Company which was later called the Taylorsville Mercantile Company. In 1894 the Taylorsville LDS Meetinghouse was built to house the Taylorsville Ward of the LDS church.

In 1905, Bennion was made a separate ward from Taylorsville. Before this point, it was often referred to as South Taylorsville.

=== Twentieth century ===
The territorial legislature passed Utah's first Compulsory Education Law in 1890 which gradually brought most children off the farms and into the classroom. It had little effect until the early 1900s when small local school districts, seen as a roadblock to raising the standard of Utah education, were consolidated. In December 1904 the Salt Lake County Commission voted to combine 22 of the 36 local school districts into the Granite School District with boundaries that matched the LDS Granite Stake boundaries. Schools which up to that time were often numbered were given names.

In 1905, 600 people lived in Bennion, enough to split from the Taylorsville LDS Ward and create the Bennion Ward to the south. Meetings were held in the red brick schoolhouse for a time until the Bennion meetinghouse was built in 1907 at the corner of 6200 South and Redwood Road next to the school.

The need for a "modern" school and the establishment of compulsory tax-supported public schools throughout Utah gave rise to the old Plymouth Elementary School on Redwood Road and 4800 South. By 1907, there were so many children in the Bennion school that the upper grades were sent to the two-story red brick Plymouth School in Taylorsville. In 1909 an amusement hall and classrooms were added to the Taylorsville Chapel. Electricity came to the Taylorsville area during the early 1900s but had little effect on the life of most people who saw little use for it outside lighting their homes. It was considered a luxury and many families chose not to connect until the 1920s or 1930s when rural electrification made power available to everyone.

Two railroads were important to Taylorsville, the Rio Grande, and Western to Bingham Junction (Midvale), and the Bingham-Garfield Railroad was added through the area in 1910. A well was dug at 4700 South and 5400 West where a locomotive watering station was built. In 1913 the electric Salt Lake Inter-Urban, often call the "Orem Line", was built to make it possible to ride into Salt Lake or as far as Payson on the "Red Arrow" in from the Francklyn Station in Murray or at the Bennion Station. The line ran parallel to Redwood Road about 1800 West. In 1915 the first water system was built by private subscription. People who wanted clean water piped to their homes paid to have it delivered to them. Later this system was bought and expanded by the Taylorsville-Bennion Improvement District. Electricity came to the area in 1916 along Redwood Road. During World War I four young men from Taylorsville lost their lives and sixteen served in the armed forces.

By the 1920s, two canals were built to carry water to farms farther and farther west. Redwood Road was finally rebuilt using concrete making it faster and easier to travel for the mixture of automobiles, wagons, and horses that used it. How Redwood Road got its name has been the subject of much debate but, when there are no redwoods in the valley, the following explanation rings truest. A line parallel to the base meridian was surveyed on the west side of the Jordan River for use in measuring property lines. Redwood stakes that did not decay in the ground were used for the "Redwood Line". It remained the Redwood Line until 1895 when Redwood Road was built as the main thoroughfare for the west side of Salt Lake County. In 1927 the "Pole Line Road" 2700 West was constructed.

=== World War II ===
In World War II, 75 men from Taylorsville served and two lost their lives overseas. After the attack on Pearl Harbor in December 1941, the United States Army Air Corps wanted an isolated place to build a training base safe from any attacks by the Japanese and on the main rail routes to the Pacific Coast. The United States Department of War bought 5,000 acres (20 km^{2}) of dry farmland in the western part of Salt Lake Valley. The land originally was part of a federal land grant to the state of Utah to be used to benefit schools and universities in Utah. But it had long since passed into private hands and was used for dry farms. Camp Kearns went through renamings as the focus and mission of the base changed; Camp Kearns was the name which stuck. It opened in 1942 but took about a year to gain its final size. The base was named for Senator Thomas Kearns of Utah, who had made his fortune in the silver mines at Park City. Camp Kearns was not in Taylorsville but to the west of the settlement.

A year later, Camp Kearns had 40,000 residents and was Utah's third-largest city at the time. It had two main missions. It served as a basic training facility for replacement troops headed for the war against Japan. Camp Kearns included a 600-target practice range, the largest in the U.S., a difficult, mile-long obstacle course, a grenade practice ground, and barracks for thousands of men on their way to the Pacific coast. The motor pool hired more than 80 local women just to drive trucks; in all about 1200 civilians worked at the base at any given time. Camp Kearns had the largest hospital in Utah at the time which spread into ten buildings. A camp newspaper called the Valley View News provided information and entertainment to the troops stationed there.

The base had a water system and one of two water treatment plants in the state. The streets were laid out in a huge grid pattern lined with over 900 wooden buildings covered with tar paper. A railroad spur from the Denver and the Rio Grande was built to transport equipment and personnel to the base. By August 21, 1942, the Kearns had 1,700,000 square feet (160,000 m^{2}) of warehouse space, two all-purpose theaters, gyms, two firehouses, several dusty parade grounds, a post office, a lending library, and a bank. Thousands of trees and shrubs were planted to keep the dust down.

The second mission of Camp Kearns was a practice air force base for Army Air Corps ground crews. In time, technical training of air force ground crews became Camp Kearns's main objective. This included many kinds of schools: navigation, intelligence, radio, teleprinter, clerical, and many others. It was not an air force base with airplanes landing and taking off, ground crews were trained on planes scattered around the base.

The base had five chapels, three stores, and three theaters, one of them for African-American servicemen. It still exists as part of Kearns Junior High School. The United Service Organizations brought many entertainers to the base to keep the troops from getting homesick. The Band Wagon Committee raised more than $15,000,000 in war bonds from the communities around Salt Lake and the men and women in uniform.

Camp Kearns gave an indirect boost to Taylorsville in that a huge water pipe brought water from the east side of Salt Lake to the camp. Once Camp Kearns closed, the presence of clean drinking water and a sewer treatment plant made it possible for people to move to Kearns and live in some of the first large subdivisions built in western Salt Lake County in the 1950s. But the camp is not in the Taylorsville city limits but the Kearns metro township.

Taylorsville and Bennion joined to form their own water and sewer district to provide clean water. The large water tank on the hill at 3200 west and 6200 South and the other ones buried inside the hill are a part of the work to provide the clean water. Salt Lake County's rapidly-growing population began expanding west in the early 1970s and farmers found they could sell their land to developers for a lot more than they were making on the farms.

=== Incorporation ===
In the 1980s, the intersection at Redwood Road 5400 South began to be developed into a regional retail center with Harmons, Grand Central, Walmart, and the Family Center. Taylorsville, Bennion, and Kearns continued rapid growth into the early 1990s. Some people felt that the Salt Lake County Commission, which governed the area, was allowing too much growth too fast, especially apartment complexes. The county seemed unwilling to listen to residents which resulted in the first drive to incorporate Taylorsville City. It failed by a narrow margin.

In 1995, voters approved the creation of a new city due to the rising costs of county services, a feeling that the county was not giving residents their money's worth revolving around insufficient law enforcement, a lack of input in how Taylorsville and Bennion were developing, and the seemingly unlimited apartment developments.

Many Kearns residents were upset when Taylorsville's proposed boundary extended its western border to 4000 West which was considered by residents in that area to be part of Kearns. But residents there approved Taylorsville's incorporation by a significant margin, (as they were given large tax breaks) and that is where the border remains.

After incorporation, there was a lively discussion about what the new city should be called. Midvalley City, Oquirrh City, Centennial, and Taylorsville–Bennion were all discussed. Eventually, Taylorsville was chosen. Taylorsville's nickname is "Utah's Centennial City" because it officially came into existence 100 years after Utah became a state.

== Governance ==
Taylorsville is governed by a five-member city council, mayor, and presiding judge representing the legislative, executive, and judicial branches of government. City council members and the mayor are elected to staggered four-year terms of office. The election of city council members and the mayor are non-partisan, contested elections. The presiding judge and other judges serve six-year terms of office. Every six years, the judges must stand for retention in an unopposed, non-partisan election. The retention election of the judges is county-wide and are the only municipal elected positions to permit voters from outside of the city boundaries to vote for or against a city official.

The city has been divided into five districts each with its own city council member. There are no "at-large" seats. The mayor is the only elected position that runs citywide. The city council elects from its members a chairperson and vice-chairperson who are responsible for the organization and operation of the city council.

In addition to its mayor, the executive branch is managed by a full-time city administrator. The city administrator is appointed by the mayor and confirmed by the city council. While the city contracts for many of its services (public works, garbage collection, street and road maintenance), it has its own code enforcement, economic development, police, and community development departments. Unified Fire Authority is managed and funded separately from the city of which the City has a seat on the UFA board.

The judicial branch is vested in a municipal justice court which is administered by a presiding judge. The presiding judge is elected from amongst the judges of the court and confirmed by the city council. The presiding judge, with the input of all of the judges of the court, oversees the hiring and training of all court personnel and manages the court budget. The Taylorsville Court is notable by establishing the second DUI (drunk driving) court in the nation and the first misdemeanor Drug/DUI hybrid court in Utah. In addition, the Court has a dedicated Domestic Violence calendar and a Dual Focus program for Drug/Alcohol abusers with a history of violence. Judges serve six-year terms and must stand for a retention election at the end of each term.

== Geography ==
According to the United States Census Bureau, the city has a total area of 10.85 square miles (28.1 km^{2}), all land.

== Demographics ==
Historical population
| Census | Pop. | Note | %± |
|---|---|---|---|
| 1980 | 17,448 | | — |
| 1990 | 52,354 | | 200.1% |
| 2000 | 57,439 | | 9.7% |
| 2010 | 58,652 | | 2.1% |
| 2020 | 60,448 | | 3.1% |
U.S. Decennial Census

=== 2020 census ===
As of the 2020 census, Taylorsville had a population of 60,448. The median age was 34.7 years. 24.8% of residents were under the age of 18 and 14.1% of residents were 65 years of age or older. For every 100 females there were 99.3 males, and for every 100 females age 18 and over there were 97.2 males age 18 and over.

100.0% of residents lived in urban areas, while 0.0% lived in rural areas.

There were 20,615 households in Taylorsville, of which 35.1% had children under the age of 18 living in them. Of all households, 51.3% were married-couple households, 17.7% were households with a male householder and no spouse or partner present, and 24.1% were households with a female householder and no spouse or partner present. About 21.0% of all households were made up of individuals and 8.3% had someone living alone who was 65 years of age or older.

There were 21,371 housing units, of which 3.5% were vacant. The homeowner vacancy rate was 0.7% and the rental vacancy rate was 6.3%.

Racial composition as of the 2020 census
| Race | Number | Percent |
|---|---|---|
| White | 40,197 | 66.5% |
| Black or African American | 1,460 | 2.4% |
| American Indian and Alaska Native | 824 | 1.4% |
| Asian | 2,781 | 4.6% |
| Native Hawaiian and Other Pacific Islander | 1,530 | 2.5% |
| Some other race | 6,880 | 11.4% |
| Two or more races | 6,776 | 11.2% |
| Hispanic or Latino (of any race) | 14,324 | 23.7% |

=== 2010 census ===
As of the 2010 census, there were 58,652 people, 19,121 households, and 13,477 families residing in the city. The population density was 5,415 people per square mile (2,076.5/km^{2}). There were 20,049 housing units at an average density of 1,851.2 per square mile (692.6/km^{2}).

The racial makeup of the city was 78.2% White, 1.9% African American, 0.9% Native American, 3.9% Asian, 2.2% Pacific Islander, 9.5% from other races, and 3.4% from two or more races. Hispanic or Latino of any race were 18.6% of the population.

There were 19,121 households, out of which 39% had children under the age of 18 living with them, 54.9% were married couples living together, 12.6% had a female householder with no husband present, and 26.7% were non-families. 20.6% of all households were living alone and 6.7% had someone living alone who was 65 years of age or older. The average household size was 2.96 and the average family size was 3.43.

In the city, the population was spread out, with 27.5% under the age of 18, 11.1% from 18 to 24, 28.7% from 25 to 44, 23.7% from 45 to 64, and 9% who were 65 years of age or older. The median age was 31 years. For every 100 males, there were 100.1 females. For every 100 females age 18 and over, there were 95.6 males.

The median income for a household in the city was $54,881, and the median income for a family was $62,023. Males had a median income of $34,947 versus $24,801 for females. The per capita income for the city was $21,210. About 9.7% of families and 12.8% of the population were below the poverty line, including 22.1% of those under age 18 and 4.5% of those age 65 or over.

== Notable people ==
- Johnny Anderson, former member of the Utah House of Representatives
- Adam S. Bennion, LDS official
- Harden Bennion, member of the Utah State Senate and former Utah secretary of state
- Milton Bennion, academic administrator
- Samuel O. Bennion, LDS official
- John Buck, MLB player
- Kim Coleman, former member of the Utah House of Representatives
- James Dunnigan, member of the Utah House of Representatives
- Wayne Harper, member of the Utah State Legislature
- Richard P. Lindsay, LDS official
- Aimee Winder Newton, member of the Salt Lake County Council
- Ryne Sanborn, ice hockey coach and former actor
- Beverly White, longest serving woman in the Utah State Legislature

== See also ==
- List of cities and towns in Utah
- Anime Banzai, Utah's first anime convention and largest fan convention, held at the Salt Lake Community College Redwood campus in Taylorsville
