= Kearns, Utah =

- City
- Aerial view of Kearns

- Location in Salt Lake County and the state of Utah.
- Coordinates: 40°39′11″N 112°0′24″W
- Country: United States
- State: Utah
- County: Salt Lake
- Founded: 1 May 1942
- Granted Township Status: June 1, 2002
- Incorporated as a Metro Township: January 1, 2017
- Incorporated as a City: May 1, 2024
- Named for: Thomas Kearns

Government
  - Mayor: Jesse Valdez

Area
  - Total: 4.63 sq mi (11.99 km^{2})
  - Land: 4.63 sq mi (11.99 km^{2})
  - Water: 0 sq mi (0.00 km^{2})
- Elevation: 4,530 ft (1,380 m)

Population (2020)
  - Total: 36,723
  - Density: 7,931.53/sq mi (3,062.38/km^{2})
- Time zone: UTC-7 (Mountain (MST))
  - Summer (DST): UTC-6 (MDT)
- ZIP code: 84118
- Area codes: 385, 801
- FIPS code: 49-40470
- GNIS feature ID: 1429290
- Website: kearns.utah.gov

Kearns (/kɜːrnz/ kurnz) is a city in Salt Lake County, Utah, United States. Named after Utah's U.S. Senator Thomas Kearns, it had a population of 36,723 at the 2020 Census. This was a 2.8 percent increase over the 2010 figure of 35,731. Kearns is home to the Utah Olympic Oval, an indoor speed skating oval built for the 2002 Winter Olympics.

== History ==
=== World War II ===
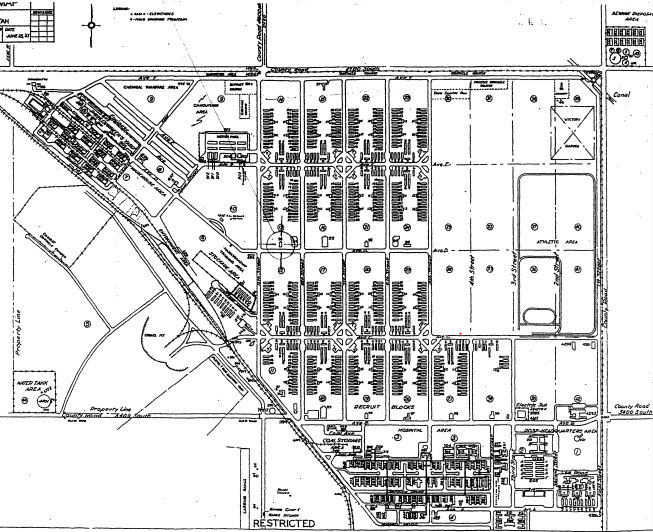
Map of Camp Kearns

Kearns came into existence 1 May 1942 as a World War II United States Army Air Forces training facility known as Kearns Army Air Base (also known as Kearns Center; redesignated: Camp Kearns, 1 January 1944). Before the base was built, the area consisted of dry farms on land reserved for universities and colleges. Construction of the base involved building several hundred buildings. Most base buildings, not meant for long-term use, were constructed of temporary or semi-permanent materials. Most support buildings sat on concrete foundations but were of frame construction clad in little more than plywood and tarpaper. The thousands of soldiers and airmen stationed there temporarily made the base one of the largest cities in the state.

Despite being called an Air Base, it had no runways. On its south border was Municipal Airport No. 2, but this was a small field for solely private aviation. It was proposed in 1941 and completed in 1942 so that Municipal Airport No. 1, which became Salt Lake Air Base, the current Salt Lake City International, 10 miles to the north, could be used by the military. Men who flew to Kearns landed at SLC.

In December 1944, Theron C. Teel, president of the Interstate Flying Service, created the Kearns Flying Club to give lessons and rent small single-engine privately owned planes to men at Kearns Army Air Base.

On 15 August 1946, the Air Force deactivated the base and turned the facility over to the State of Utah. The presence of roads and other infrastructure made the area attractive to developers. Houses and businesses sprang up rapidly on what had just a few years earlier been farmland. A theater for "colored personnel" became part of Kearns Junior High School. A base chapel is now part of Our Lady of Perpetual Help Catholic Church. The base train station is a day-care center. A cannon that had stood next to the headquarters' flagpole stood for many years at the corner of 40th West and 54th South. The unrelated Municipal Airport No. 2 is known as South Valley Regional Airport.

=== Post war and turn of the century ===
Kearns, in the mid to late twentieth century, saw rapid growth on the former airbase. The old streets and foundations of buildings built by the military were used as a template for the town, and homes sprang up quickly as Kearns was becoming the first suburb in Salt Lake County. By the 1970s and into the 1980s, suburban development expanded west of the railroad tracks to 5600 West. In the 1990s there were arguments between the residents of Kearns, West Valley City, and West Jordan city over annexation. West Valley City began annexing land west of Kearns and cut the community from future development. West Jordan annexed the Oquirrh Shadows subdivision and the remaining land became the Oquirrh CDP. In the late 1990s West Valley City and West Jordan were having talks to divide what was left of Kearns to divide the community along 5400 south where anything south of the road would belong to West Jordan and anything North would belong to West Valley City. The residents of Kearns raised enough signatures to stop the annexation and leave Kearns' boundaries as they are today. In 2002, the Winter Olympics brought construction of the Olympic Oval at Oquirrh Park. The Olympic Oval was built on a former running track. The Utah Olympic Oval in Kearns was the venue for long-track speed skating events in the 2002 Winter Olympics. Because of its altitude, which gives it the thinnest air of any such facility in the world, and its unique architecture, which allows for close control of temperature and ice conditions, the Oval saw numerous records set during the games. It remains arguably the fastest ice surface in the world. It is used today as a tourist attraction and a recreation spot. The last major housing area constructed in Kearns was an area between 5600 west and 6200 south.

=== 2005–present ===
In 2015, the township of Kearns voted to incorporate as a metro township, a new form of local government that allowed it to elect a council and mayor. Kearns could have also voted to become a city. The following year five council members were elected from five districts and took office in 2017. In 2019 and 2020, more housing was built around Oquirrh Park and a new Kearns Library was finished in December 2020. Every year, in late July and early August, a parade takes place in Kearns. In May 2024, Kearns was officially incorporated as a city, as a result of Utah's House Bill 35.

In 2026, Kearns swore in Jesse Valdez as mayor, making him the first Hispanic mayor in Utah history.

== Geography ==
According to the United States Census Bureau, the city has a total area of 4.63 square miles (12.0 km^{2}), all land.

Kearns lies on the western side of the Salt Lake Valley and West Bench. The majority of the city lies on the lake bed of the Provo episode of Lake Bonneville, while all of Kearns lies on the Bonneville lake bed. Kearns borders West Valley City to the north and west, Taylorsville to the east, and West Jordan to the south.

The area where Kearns is situated is on a natural formation called the Kearns-Benion hill, which rises approximately 100 feet (30 m) above the valley. The hill runs in a northwest direction from the Jordan River to Bacchus hill in the Oquirrh Mountains.

=== Climate ===
This climatic region is typified by large seasonal temperature differences, with warm to hot (usually dry) summers and cold (sometimes severely cold) winters. According to the Köppen Climate Classification system, Kearns has a humid continental climate, abbreviated "Dfb" on climate maps.

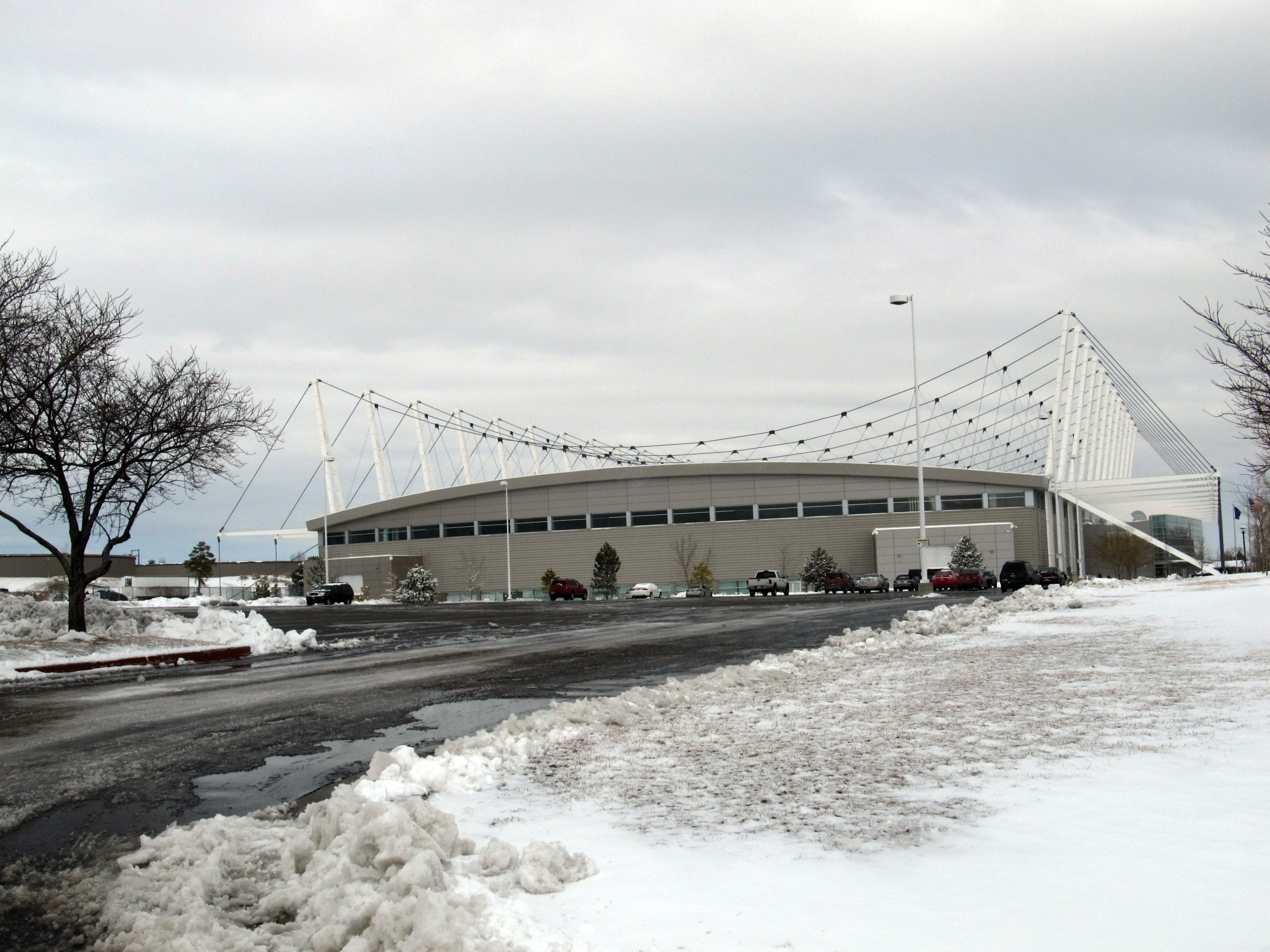
Utah Olympic Oval

== Demographics ==
Historical population
Census	Pop.	Note	%±
1960	17,172		—
1970	17,071		−0.6%
1980	21,353		25.1%
1990	28,374		32.9%
2000	33,659		18.6%
2010	35,731		6.2%
2020	36,723		2.8%

According to estimates from the Kem C. Gardner Policy Institute of the University of Utah, as of 2015, there were 36,530 people in Kearns. The racial makeup of the county was 60.2% non-Hispanic White, 0.9% Black, 0.8% Native American, 2.1% Asian, 2.0% Pacific Islander, and 2.4% from two or more races. 31.7% of the population were Hispanic or Latino of any race.

As of the census of 2010, there were 35,731 people, 9,789 households, and 9,209 families residing in the CDP. The population density was 7,444 people per square mile (4,625.5/km^{2}). There were 10,169 housing units at an average density of 2,118.5/sq mi (1,316.4/km^{2}). The racial makeup of the CDP was 70.3% White, 1.4% African American, 1.4% Native American, 2.1% Asian, 2.6% Pacific Islander, 18.7% from other races, and 3.5% from two or more races. Hispanic or Latino of any race were 32.8% of the population.

There were 9,789 households, out of which 54.1% had children under the age of 18 living with them, 67.3% were married couples living together, 13.1% had a female householder with no husband present, and 13.8% were non-families. 10.5% of all households were made up of individuals, and 3.7% had someone living alone who was 65 years of age or older. The average household size was 3.65 and the average family size was 3.88.

In the CDP, the population was spread out, with 37.2% under the age of 18, 11.2% from 18 to 24, 32.0% from 25 to 44, 13.4% from 45 to 64, and 6.3% who were 65 years of age or older. The median age was 26 years. For every 100 females, there were 102.5 males. For every 100 females age 18 and over, there were 100.2 males.

The median income for a household in the CDP was $45,711, and the median income for a family was $46,598. Males had a median income of $31,444 versus $22,838 for females. The per capita income for the CDP was $14,110. About 5.1% of families and 7.1% of the population were below the poverty line, including 9.3% of those under age 18 and 6.5% of those age 65 or over.

Kearns metro township, Utah – Racial composition Note: the US Census treats Hispanic/Latino as an ethnic category. This table excludes Latinos from the racial categories and assigns them to a separate category. Hispanics/Latinos may be of any race.
Race (NH = Non-Hispanic)	% 2020	% 2010	% 2000	Pop 2020	Pop 2010	Pop 2000
White alone (NH)	47.2%	58.7%	73.4%	17,342	20,976	24,707
Black alone (NH)	1.3%	1.1%	0.5%	475	405	179
American Indian alone (NH)	0.7%	0.8%	0.7%	268	301	251
Asian alone (NH)	2%	2%	1.7%	743	715	560
Pacific Islander alone (NH)	3%	2.6%	2.3%	1,085	922	772
Other race alone (NH)	0.5%	0.3%	0.2%	169	103	54
Multiracial (NH)	3%	1.6%	1.6%	1,103	580	532
Hispanic/Latino (any race)	42.3%	32.8%	19.6%	15,538	11,729	6,604

The most reported ancestries in 2020 were:

- Mexican (32.1%)
- English (19.7%)
- German (7%)
- Irish (5.7%)
- Scottish (2.8%)
- Samoan (1.8%)
- Italian (1.7%)
- Danish (1.7%)
- Tongan (1.6%)
- Spanish (1.5%)

== See also ==
- List of census-designated places in Utah
