= 2023 in the United States =

- Decades: 2000s; 2010s; 2020s; 2030s
- See also: History of the United States (2016–present); Timeline of United States history (2010–present); List of years in the United States

The following political story of the year has been the 270-day long speakership of Representative Kevin McCarthy, whose slim majority in the House of Representatives has enabled a far-right rebellion to exert more weight over the lower chamber. The battle between the Freedom Caucus and McCarthy has been at the heart of an averted debt-ceiling crisis and the annual budget debate nearly devolving into a government shutdown, all culminating in the removal of McCarthy on October 3. The debate over abortion has further continued, with numerous laws being passed by state legislatures and court decisions issued at all levels over the issue with last year's overturning of Roe v. Wade and Planned Parenthood v. Casey with Dobbs v. Jackson Women's Health Organization. Political and media attention also has focused on a series of alleged Chinese spy balloons entering US airspace, various candidates entering the race for the following year's presidential election, legal issues surrounding former president Donald Trump and to a lesser extent Representative George Santos, and the continued intensity of a culture war most notably escalated by an ongoing feud between Florida governor Ron DeSantis and the Walt Disney Company over the state's Parental Rights in Education Act.

2023 also saw the roots of a global banking crisis arise out of four American regional banks, the two largest being Silicon Valley Bank and First Republic Bank. 2021's inflation surge moderated in 2023, while the Federal Reserve continued to raise its interest rates in the first half of the year. The rise of artificial intelligence and large language models dominated not only the economy but has also been at the root of a Hollywood "double strike" conducted by Writers Guild of America and a SAG-AFTRA strike; these were part of a larger phenomenon of labor strikes across the country, in which such large diverse groups, such as teamsters and autoworkers won new contracts. Additionally, the latter half of the year saw many large mergers and acquisitions; some of the largest announcements being in oil and gas with ExxonMobil's purchase of Pioneer Natural Resources for nearly $60 billion and Chevron's acquisition of Hess Corporation for $50 billion, both in October and pending regulatory approval prior to closure. Mass shootings in 2023 have also continued in high numbers, with 528 occurring as of October 2 according to Gun Violence Archive. Additionally in 2023, as of November 8, the US experienced 25 weather and climate disasters which caused at least $1 billion in damage each.

== Incumbents ==
=== Federal government ===
- President: Joe Biden (D-Delaware)
- Vice President: Kamala Harris (D-California)
- Chief Justice: John Roberts (Maryland)
- Speaker of the House:

Nancy Pelosi (D-California) (until January 3)
Kevin McCarthy (R-California) (January 7 – October 3)
vacant (October 3–25), (Note: Patrick McHenry (R-North Carolina) acted as Speaker pro tempore during this period.)
Mike Johnson (R-Louisiana) (since October 25)

- Senate Majority Leader: Chuck Schumer (D-New York)
- Congress: 117th (until January 3), 118th (starting January 3)

==== State governments ====
Governors and lieutenant governors

=== Governors ===
- Governor of Alabama: Kay Ivey (Republican)
- Governor of Alaska: Mike Dunleavy (Republican)
- Governor of Arizona: Doug Ducey (Republican) (until January 2), Katie Hobbs (Democratic) (since January 2)
- Governor of Arkansas: Asa Hutchinson (Republican) (until January 10), Sarah Huckabee Sanders (Republican) (since January 10)
- Governor of California: Gavin Newsom (Democratic)
- Governor of Colorado: Jared Polis (Democratic)
- Governor of Connecticut: Ned Lamont (Democratic)
- Governor of Delaware: John Carney (Democratic)
- Governor of Florida: Ron DeSantis (Republican)
- Governor of Georgia: Brian Kemp (Republican)
- Governor of Hawaii: Josh Green (Democratic)
- Governor of Idaho: Brad Little (Republican)
- Governor of Illinois: J. B. Pritzker (Democratic)
- Governor of Indiana: Eric Holcomb (Republican)
- Governor of Iowa: Kim Reynolds (Republican)
- Governor of Kansas: Laura Kelly (Democratic)
- Governor of Kentucky: Andy Beshear (Democratic)
- Governor of Louisiana: John Bel Edwards (Democratic)
- Governor of Maine: Janet Mills (Democratic)
- Governor of Maryland: Larry Hogan (Republican) (until January 18), Wes Moore (Democratic) (since January 18)
- Governor of Massachusetts: Charlie Baker (Republican) (until January 5), Maura Healey (Democratic) (since January 5)
- Governor of Michigan: Gretchen Whitmer (Democratic)
- Governor of Mississippi: Tate Reeves (Republican)
- Governor of Missouri: Mike Parson (Republican)
- Governor of Minnesota: Tim Walz (Democratic)
- Governor of Montana: Greg Gianforte (Republican)
- Governor of Nebraska: Pete Ricketts (Republican) (until January 5), Jim Pillen (Republican) (since January 5)
- Governor of Nevada: Steve Sisolak (Democratic) (until January 2), Joe Lombardo (Republican) (since January 2)
- Governor of New Hampshire: Chris Sununu (Republican)
- Governor of New Jersey: Phil Murphy (Democratic)
- Governor of New Mexico: Michelle Lujan Grisham (Democratic)
- Governor of New York: Kathy Hochul (Democratic)
- Governor of North Carolina: Roy Cooper (Democratic)
- Governor of North Dakota: Doug Burgum (Republican)
- Governor of Ohio: Mike DeWine (Republican)
- Governor of Oklahoma: Kevin Stitt (Republican)
- Governor of Oregon: Kate Brown (Democratic) (until January 9), Tina Kotek (Democratic) (since January 9)
- Governor of Pennsylvania: Tom Wolf (Democratic) (until January 17), Josh Shapiro (Democratic) (since January 17)
- Governor of Rhode Island: Daniel McKee (Democratic)
- Governor of South Carolina: Henry McMaster (Republican)
- Governor of South Dakota: Kristi Noem (Republican)
- Governor of Tennessee: Bill Lee (Republican)
- Governor of Texas: Greg Abbott (Republican)
- Governor of Utah: Spencer Cox (Republican)
- Governor of Vermont: Phil Scott (Republican)
- Governor of Virginia: Glenn Youngkin (Republican)
- Governor of Washington: Jay Inslee (Democratic)
- Governor of West Virginia: Jim Justice (Republican)
- Governor of Wisconsin: Tony Evers (Democratic)
- Governor of Wyoming: Mark Gordon (Republican)

=== Lieutenant governors ===
- Lieutenant Governor of Alabama: Will Ainsworth (Republican)
- Lieutenant Governor of Alaska: Nancy Dahlstrom (Republican)
- Lieutenant Governor of Arkansas: Tim Griffin (Republican) (until January 10), Leslie Rutledge (Republican) (since January 10)
- Lieutenant Governor of California: Eleni Kounalakis (Democratic)
- Lieutenant Governor of Colorado: Dianne Primavera (Democratic)
- Lieutenant Governor of Connecticut: Susan Bysiewicz (Democratic)
- Lieutenant Governor of Delaware: Bethany Hall-Long (Democratic)
- Lieutenant Governor of Florida: Jeanette Nuñez (Republican)
- Lieutenant Governor of Georgia: Geoff Duncan (Republican) (until January 9), Burt Jones (Republican) (since January 9)
- Lieutenant Governor of Hawaii: Sylvia Luke (Democratic)
- Lieutenant Governor of Idaho: Janice McGeachin (Republican) (until January 2), Scott Bedke (Republican) (since January 2)
- Lieutenant Governor of Illinois: Juliana Stratton (Democratic)
- Lieutenant Governor of Indiana: Suzanne Crouch (Republican)
- Lieutenant Governor of Iowa: Adam Gregg (Republican)
- Lieutenant Governor of Kansas: David Toland (Democratic)
- Lieutenant Governor of Kentucky: Jacqueline Coleman (Democratic)
- Lieutenant Governor of Louisiana: Billy Nungesser (Republican)
- Lieutenant Governor of Maryland: Boyd Rutherford (Republican) (until January 18), Aruna Miller (Democratic) (since January 18)
- Lieutenant Governor of Massachusetts: Karyn Polito (Republican) (until January 5), Kim Driscoll (Democratic) (since January 5)
- Lieutenant Governor of Michigan: Garlin Gilchrist (Democratic)
- Lieutenant Governor of Minnesota: Peggy Flanagan (Democratic)
- Lieutenant Governor of Mississippi: Delbert Hosemann (Republican)
- Lieutenant Governor of Missouri: Mike Kehoe (Republican)
- Lieutenant Governor of Montana: Kristen Juras (Republican)
- Lieutenant Governor of Nebraska: Mike Foley (Republican) (until January 5), Joe Kelly (Republican) (since January 5)
- Lieutenant Governor of Nevada: Lisa Cano Burkhead (Democratic) (until January 2), Stavros Anthony (Democratic) (since January 2)
- Lieutenant Governor of New Jersey:
  - Sheila Oliver (Democratic) (until August 1),
  - Vacant (August 1 to September 8)
  - Tahesha Way (Democratic) (since September 8)
- Lieutenant Governor of New Mexico: Howie Morales (Democratic)
- Lieutenant Governor of New York: Antonio Delgado (Democratic)
- Lieutenant Governor of North Carolina: Mark Robinson (Republican)
- Lieutenant Governor of North Dakota:
  - Brent Sanford (Republican) (until January 2),
  - Vacant (January 2–3),
  - Tammy Miller (Republican) (since January 3)
- Lieutenant Governor of Ohio: Jon A. Husted (Republican)
- Lieutenant Governor of Oklahoma: Matt Pinnell (Republican)
- Lieutenant Governor of Pennsylvania:
  - John Fetterman (Democratic) (until January 3),
  - Kim Ward (Republican) (acting: January 3–17),
  - Austin Davis (Democratic) (since January 17)
- Lieutenant Governor of Rhode Island: Sabina Matos (Democratic)
- Lieutenant Governor of South Carolina: Pamela Evette (Republican)
- Lieutenant Governor of South Dakota: Larry Rhoden (Republican)
- Lieutenant Governor of Tennessee: Randy McNally (Republican)
- Lieutenant Governor of Texas: Dan Patrick (Republican)
- Lieutenant Governor of Utah: Deidre Henderson (Republican)
- Lieutenant Governor of Vermont: Molly Gray (Democratic) (until January 5), David Zuckerman (Progressive) (since January 5)
- Lieutenant Governor of Virginia: Winsome Earle-Sears (Republican)
- Lieutenant Governor of Washington: Denny Heck (Democratic)
- Lieutenant Governor of West Virginia: Craig Blair (Republican)
- Lieutenant Governor of Wisconsin: Mandela Barnes (Democratic) (until January 3), Sara Rodriguez (Democratic) (since January 3)

== Elections ==
Elections were held on November 7, 2023. This was an off-year election where neither the president or vice president were on the ballot. Seats in the US Congress were not up for election either, save for special elections. One vacancy in the Senate opened up this year due to the death of Dianne Feinstein; California governor Gavin Newsom appointed Laphonza Butler to serve the remainder of Feinstein's term.

Kentucky, Louisiana, and Mississippi held elections for their governors, lieutenant governors, state treasurers, attorney generals, and state agriculture commissioners. The cities of Chicago, Columbus, Dallas, Denver, Houston, Indianapolis, Jacksonville, Memphis, Nashville, Philadelphia, and Salt Lake City elected their mayors.

=== State and local elections ===
- April 4
  - 2023 Chicago mayoral election: Democrat Brandon Johnson is elected as mayor of Chicago.
  - 2023 Wisconsin Supreme Court election: Liberal candidate Janet Protasiewicz defeats conservative candidate Daniel Kelly, providing liberals with control of the state's highest court for the first time in fifteen years.
- June 6 – 2023 Denver mayoral election: Democrat Mike Johnston is elected as mayor of Denver.
- October 14 – 2023 Louisiana gubernatorial election: Republican Jeff Landry is elected Governor of Louisiana, defeating Democratic front-runner Shawn Wilson and several other candidates in a jungle primary.
- November 7
  - 2023 Kentucky gubernatorial election – Democratic Governor Andy Beshear is re-elected, defeating Republican state Attorney General Daniel Cameron.
  - 2023 Mississippi gubernatorial election – Republican Governor Tate Reeves is re-elected, defeating Democratic Mississippi Public Service Commission member Brandon Presley.

=== Special elections ===
- February 21 – A special election was held to fill the vacancy in Virginia's 4th congressional district left by Democrat Donald McEachin, who died on November 28, 2022. Democrat Jennifer McClellan wins the election to serve out the remainder of McEachin's term.
- November 7 – Democrat David Cicilline of Rhode Island's 1st congressional district resigned from Congress to become the president and CEO of the Rhode Island Foundation. He was succeeded by Democrat Gabe Amo, who defeated Republican Gerry Leonard Jr. in a special election, becoming the first African American to represent Rhode Island in Congress.
- November 21 – Republican Chris Stewart resigned as representative of Utah's 2nd congressional district to focus on his wife's ongoing health issues. Republican Celeste Maloy, Stewart's former legal counsel, won the special election to succeed him, defeating Democrat Kathleen Riebe and other third party candidates.

=== Referendums ===
- March 7 – Oklahoma voters rejected State Question 820, which if passed, would have legalized recreational cannabis for adults 21 and over, given a 15% excise tax on cannabis sales. The margin against State Question 820 was an overwhelming 62% against.
- April 4 – Wisconsin voters approved Question 1, Question 2, and Question 3, all by landslides. Questions 1 and 2 were binding votes ratifying amendments to the Constitution of Wisconsin, Question 3 was a nonbinding referendum. Question 1 raised the conditions necessary for pretrial release from jail; Question 2 inserted an additional paragraph allowing judges wider latitude for when to apply cash bail for people accused of violent crimes; Question 3 posed the question "Shall able-bodied, childless adults be required to look for work in order to receive taxpayer-funded welfare benefits?" Question 3 had no legal effect, and Wisconsin law already has work requirements for all welfare programs in the state.
- August 8 – Ohioans voted to reject Issue 1 by a margin of 57% against to 43% in favor. If passed, the ballot measure would have required future constitutional amendments to be passed by a 60% margin among other changes, as opposed to the existing 50% margin for approval. The ballot measure was widely seen as a litmus test for a November vote to codify abortion rights in the Republican-led state.
- November 7
  - Ohio voters approve proposals to codify abortion rights in the state's constitution and legalize marijuana for recreational use.
  - Texas voters approve 13 out of 14 amendments to the Constitution of Texas.

== Ongoing events ==
- COVID-19 pandemic in the United States (until May 11)
- United States racial unrest (2020–2023) (until September 26)
- Indictments against Donald Trump

== Events ==
=== January ===
- January 1
  - Public Domain Day: Books, films, and other works published in 1927 enter the public domain.
  - The FDA designates sesame seeds as one of the major food allergens.
- January 2 – 2022 NFL season: Buffalo Bills player Damar Hamlin collapses from cardiac arrest after a tackle, causing the Bills' game against the Cincinnati Bengals to be cancelled and deemed as a no contest.
- January 3
  - The 118th United States Congress convenes following the 2022 midterm elections. For the next four days, fifteen sessions transpire to determine the Speaker of the House of Representatives. This is the first time that a House speaker was not determined by an initial vote in over 99 years.
  - The final of several related shootings which allegedly target Democrats occurs at the home of a Democratic politician in Albuquerque, New Mexico. There are no deaths or injuries.
  - Amber McLaughlin becomes the first transgender death row inmate to be executed in the United States.
- January 4
  - European Union regulators issue a $414 million fine against Meta Platforms for violating the General Data Protection Regulation on Facebook and Instagram.
  - A mass shooting occurs inside a house in Enoch, Utah. Eight members of a single family, consisting of three adults and five children, are killed, with their bodies being found by police during a welfare check.
- January 5
  - The South Carolina Supreme Court strikes down the state's six-week abortion ban, ruling it violates the state's constitution.
  - The Idaho Supreme Court upholds the state's ban on abortion in a 3–2 ruling.
- January 6 – A sixteen-judge panel on the United States Court of Appeals for the Fifth Circuit blocks a federal ban on bump stocks.
- January 7
  - After four days and fifteen ballots, Representative Kevin McCarthy is elected the 55th Speaker of the House of Representatives.
  - San Francisco's Central Subway enters full revenue service.
  - Five black police officers of the Memphis Police Department, severely beat Tyre Nichols, a 29-year-old Black man, during a traffic stop. Nichols dies due to his injuries on January 10, and his death causes outrage and protests across the country.
- January 8
  - Immigration policy of the Joe Biden administration: President Biden visits the Mexico–United States border for the first time during his presidency.
  - Senator Ben Sasse resigns to become the president-designate of the University of Florida.
- January 9 – The University of Georgia Bulldogs win the 2023 College Football Playoff National Championship at SoFi Stadium in Inglewood, California. Georgia defeats Texas Christian University by a score of 65–7, the largest victory in college bowl game history.
- January 10
  - Allen Weisselberg is sentenced to five months in jail for a decade-long tax fraud scheme involving the Trump Organization.
  - The 80th Golden Globe Awards ceremony takes place in Beverly Hills.
  - Recreational cannabis sales begin in Connecticut.
- January 11 – 2023 FAA system outage: For the first time since 9/11, the Federal Aviation Administration issues a nationwide ground stop following the failure of the FAA's NOTAM system.
- January 12 – Joe Biden classified documents incident: Attorney general Merrick Garland appoints Robert Hur to investigate mishandling of classified documents by President Biden.
- January 12–22 – The 2023 Winter World University Games are held in Lake Placid, New York.
- January 16 – A baby, a teenager, and four others are killed in a mass shooting at a home in Goshen, California, by alleged cartel members.
- January 18 – The US Virgin Islands legalizes marijuana, becoming the third US territory and 25th US jurisdiction overall to do so.
- January 19 – Trade union membership hits an all-time low in US dropping from 10.3% to 10.1%.
- January 21 – A mass shooting occurs at a dance studio in Monterey Park, California, after a Lunar New Year celebration. Eleven people are killed, and nine more are injured; the perpetrator commits suicide the following day.
- January 23
  - Criminal proceedings in the January 6 United States Capitol attack: Four Oath Keepers in addition to the person who laid his feet on Speaker Nancy Pelosi's desk are convicted.
  - A spree of mass shootings in Half Moon Bay, California kills seven farmworkers.
- January 24 – Classified documents are revealed to be found at the home of former vice president Mike Pence.
- January 27 – Protests begin after the Memphis Police Department releases a footage of officers beating Tyre Nichols to death. Following the release of the footage, the department disbands its SCORPION unit while the Memphis Fire Services dismisses three personnel for failing to render aid.
- January 31–February 2 – A massive ice storm over the Southern United States kills 10 people.

=== February ===
- February 1
  - Tampa Bay Buccaneers quarterback Tom Brady announces his retirement from the NFL.
  - Joe Biden classified documents incident: The FBI conducts a planned search of President Biden's home in Rehoboth Beach, Delaware.
  - The Federal Reserve raises interest rates by 0.25 percent from 4.5 percent to 4.75 percent.
- February 2
  - In a party-line vote, the House of Representatives ousts Representative Ilhan Omar from the House Committee on Foreign Affairs due to remarks that she had previously made regarding Israeli policy that many deemed as antisemitic.
  - In United States v. Rahimi, the Fifth Circuit Court of Appeals rules that a federal law which criminalizes the possession of a firearm by an individual who is subject to a restraining order for domestic violence is unconstitutional.
  - 2023 Chinese balloon incident: Defense officials announce that a suspected Chinese surveillance balloon is being tracked over the western United States.
- February 3
  - Recreational cannabis sales begin in Missouri.
  - A Norfolk Southern train derails while carrying dangerous chemicals outside of East Palestine, Ohio, creating a large environmental disaster.
- February 4
  - The suspected Chinese spy balloon is shot down by a missile off the coast of South Carolina.
  - February 2023 North American cold wave: Mount Washington, New Hampshire sets a record low wind chill temperature in the country at −108 °F (−78 °C).
  - The 2023 National Hockey League All-Star Game is held at the FLA Live Arena in Sunrise, Florida, with the Atlantic Division winning. The arena was originally supposed to hold the 2021 All Star Game but it was cancelled due to the COVID-19 pandemic.
- February 5
  - The NFL's first iteration of the Pro Bowl Games is held at Allegiant Stadium in Paradise, Nevada. The NFC wins 35–33.
  - The 65th Annual Grammy Awards returns to Crypto.com Arena in Los Angeles, California, after being away for three years due to the COVID-19 pandemic and various scheduling conflicts. "About Damn Time" by Lizzo wins Record of the Year, Harry's House by Harry Styles wins Album of the Year, while Beyoncé wins her 32nd award to become the most winning artist of all time.
- February 7
  - President Biden gives his second official State of the Union Address to Congress.
  - LeBron James breaks the all time NBA scoring record, scoring 38,388 points. The record was previously held by Hall of Famer Kareem Abdul-Jabbar.
- February 9
  - Pence is subpoenaed by a special counsel leading investigations into Trump.
  - The United States military shoots down a high altitude object over Alaska.
- February 10 – Mike Pence classified documents incident: The FBI conducts a search of Pence's home and finds an additional classified document.
- February 11 – The United States military, under orders of President Biden, shoots down a high altitude object over Yukon, Canada.
- February 12
  - The United States military shoots down an unidentified object over Lake Huron, the third in less than a week.
  - 2022 NFL season: The Kansas City Chiefs defeat the Philadelphia Eagles by a score of 38–35 to win Super Bowl LVII. Quarterback Patrick Mahomes wins Super Bowl MVP.
- February 13
  - Georgia judge Robert C.I. McBurney approves the release of parts of a grand jury inquiry investigating Trump's effort to overturn election results in Georgia.
  - A mass shooting is carried out at Michigan State University. Three students were killed in the attack and five others injured. The shooter committed suicide as he was being approached by police.
- February 14 – Nikki Haley announces her 2024 presidential campaign.
- February 17 – A shooting spree takes place in Arkabutla, Mississippi, killing six people and injuring one other person. The suspect is later arrested.
- February 19 – Ricky Stenhouse Jr. wins the 2023 running of the Daytona 500, beginning the 2023 NASCAR Cup Series.
- February 21 – Entrepreneur Vivek Ramaswamy announces his candidacy for president in the 2024 election.
- February 21–24 – A massive winter storm causes extreme wind and rain on the West Coast of the United States, while bringing extreme blizzard conditions to the Midwest and Northeast.
- February 23 – The syndicated Dilbert comic strip is dropped by many newspapers, most notably the Los Angeles Times, The Washington Post, and USA Today, after creator Scott Adams posts a video in which he characterized Black people as a "hate group".

=== March ===
- March 2
  - Trial of Alex Murdaugh: Alex Murdaugh is convicted by a jury and sentenced to life in prison without parole the next day for the murders of both his wife and son as well as two gun charges.
  - Tennessee governor Bill Lee signs the Tennessee Adult Entertainment Act into law, controversial legislation which bans drag performances towards minors in the state.
  - Businessman Perry Johnson announces his 2024 presidential campaign.
- March 3
  - Walgreens announces that it will not sell abortion pills in states where Republican officials threaten to take legal action.
  - Donald Trump releases a video outlining his proposition for Freedom Cities.
- March 4 – Marianne Williamson announces her 2024 presidential campaign.
- March 6 – State representative Bryan Slaton introduces the Texas Independence Referendum Act which, if passed, would call for a state referendum on the secession of Texas from the United States. The bill would later fail to get out of committee before the end of the regular session.
- March 8
  - Transgender rights in the United States: Minnesota governor Tim Walz signs an executive order to protect gender-affirming healthcare.
  - March 2023 United States bank failures: Silvergate Bank, a bank that dealt mostly in cryptocurrency, announces its plan to liquidate and effectively ceases operations after it failed to remain solvent due to a tumultuous cryptocurrency market.
- March 10 – In the largest bank failure since the 2008 financial crisis, Silicon Valley Bank, with $212 billion in assets, becomes the second bank to fail this month after it is shuttered by regulators after a bank run leads to its collapse. It would become the third largest bank failure after First Republic Bank failed a month later.
- March 12
  - The 95th Academy Awards, hosted by Jimmy Kimmel, are held at the Dolby Theatre in Los Angeles. Daniel Kwan and Daniel Scheinert's Everything Everywhere All at Once lead the nominations with eleven. The film wins seven of those awards, including Best Picture. The telecast, not counting streaming views, garnered 18.7 million views, a slight increase from the previous ceremony.
  - Signature Bank collapses and becomes the third bank in five days to fail. With $110 billion in assets, it is the fourth largest bank failure in American history.
- March 13 – The Alaska Willow project, which calls for oil extraction in the northern region of the state, is approved. The project was and remains subject to substantial controversy and protest, especially on social media.
- March 14 – The March 2023 nor'easter causes widespread damage and knocks out power for 250,000 people in New York and New England.
- March 15 – Federal regulators approve the merger of major railroads Kansas City Southern and Canadian Pacific.
- March 18 – Wyoming becomes the first US state to ban the Mifepristone pill.
- March 20
  - The Idaho state legislature passes a bill that brings in execution by firing squad. If signed by the governor, Idaho would become the fifth state to use this method.
  - President Biden issues his first veto to block a federal rule by the Department of Labor to weigh the long-term impacts of social factors and climate change on investments.
- March 22 – The Federal Reserve raises interest rates by 0.25 percent from 4.75 percent to 5 percent.
- March 24 – 2023 Pennsylvania chocolate factory explosion: An explosion at an R.M. Palmer Company chocolate factory in West Reading, Pennsylvania kills seven and injures eight others.
- March 24–27 – A tornado outbreak kills at least 26 people in Mississippi and Alabama. This includes a violent tornado which devastated the city of Rolling Fork and the town of Silver City in Mississippi, killing 16 people and injuring 165 others.
- March 27
  - Six victims as well as the perpetrator are killed in a mass shooting at the Covenant School in Nashville, Tennessee.
  - President Biden invokes the Defense Production Act to spend $50 million on the production of printed circuit boards.
- March 28 – The United States announces that it will stop sharing information about its nuclear arsenal with Russia over the latter's withdrawal from the New START nuclear arms treaty.
- March 29 – In basketball, the Sacramento Kings make the NBA playoffs for the first time since 2006, ending their record 17-year playoff drought.
- March 30
  - Stormy Daniels–Donald Trump scandal: Trump is indicted over his hush money payments to porn star Stormy Daniels, making him the first former president to be charged with a crime.
  - The International Court of Justice rules that the United States violated its Treaty of Amity with Iran when it allowed its domestic courts to freeze assets held by Iranian companies.
- March 31 – Kentucky governor Andy Beshear signs a bill legalizing medical cannabis in the state.
- March 31–April 1 – At least 32 people are killed in a series of tornado outbreaks in the south and midwest.

=== April ===
- April 1 – Federal judge Robert L. Pitman orders that twelve books containing LGBT and racial content which were banned by Llano County, Texas school officials must be returned to school shelves.
- April 2
  - Former Arkansas governor Asa Hutchinson announces his 2024 presidential campaign.
  - LSU's women's basketball team defeats Iowa's by a score of 102-85 to win the 2023 running of women's March Madness. The Lady Tigers score their first national title, and the game scores the highest TV ratings in tournament history.
- April 3
  - World Wrestling Entertainment is sold to Endeavor, the parent company of the mixed martial arts promotion Ultimate Fighting Championship. WWE and UFC are set to merge and form a new company, with the merger to be finalized by the second half of the year.
  - In men's college basketball, UConn defeats San Diego State 76–59 to win the 2023 running of men's March Madness, getting their fifth championship title.
  - NASA announces the crew of Artemis II, the first crewed mission to the Moon and beyond Low Earth orbit since Apollo 17 in 1972.
- April 4 – Indictment of Donald Trump: The former president pleads not guilty to 34 charges of falsifying business records related to the scandal involving Stormy Daniels.
- April 5 – Attorney and author Robert F. Kennedy Jr. announces his presidential campaign, challenging Biden in the 2024 Democratic primaries.
- April 6
  - 2023 Tennessee House of Representatives expulsions: The Republican-dominated Tennessee House of Representatives expels two Democrats who protested in favor of gun control reform; a vote to expel a third one failed.
  - ProPublica publishes a report which details that Associate Justice Clarence Thomas has repeatedly failed to disclose luxury trips with Republican megadonor Harlan Crow over the past twenty years.
- April 10
  - Five people are killed and eight others are injured in a mass shooting at a bank in Louisville, Kentucky. The perpetrator is also killed.
  - 2022–2023 Pentagon document leaks: Documents from the Pentagon detailing foreign military aid related to the Russian invasion of Ukraine is leaked onto the Internet.
  - 2023 Tennessee House of Representatives expulsions: The Metropolitan Council of Nashville and Davidson County unanimously votes to reinstate Representative Justin Jones to his seat in the Tennessee House of Representatives.
- April 11 – In ice hockey, the Boston Bruins break the NHL record for the most points scored in a single season with 133 points. This comes two days after surpassing the 2018–19 Tampa Bay Lightning and 1995–96 Detroit Red Wings for the most wins in a regular season with their 63rd win.
- April 12
  - The Arizona Supreme Court rules that the Latter-day Saints Church can refuse to answer questions or turn over documents under a state law that exempts religious officials from having to report child sex abuse if they learn of the crime during a confessional setting.
  - 2023 Tennessee House of Representatives expulsions: The Shelby County Commission votes to re-instate Justin J. Pearson to the Tennessee House of Representatives.
- April 13
  - 2022–2023 Pentagon document leaks: The FBI arrests Jack Teixeira, a 21-year-old member of the Massachusetts Air National Guard, who allegedly leaked classified United States Department of Defense documents on his Discord server. On the following day, he is charged with violating the Espionage Act of 1917.
  - Florida enacts legislation which bans most abortions after six weeks.
- April 14 – Montana becomes the first state to pass legislation banning TikTok on all personal devices from operating within state lines and barring app stores from offering TikTok for downloads.
- April 15 – 2023 Dadeville shooting: Four people are killed, and 32 injured, at a birthday celebration in Dadeville, Alabama.
- April 18
  - Fox News and Dominion Voting Systems reach a $787.5 million settlement in the latter's defamation lawsuit against the news network.
  - A shooting occurs in Bowdoin and Yarmouth, Maine, killing four and injuring three.
- April 20
  - Larry Elder announces his campaign for president on an episode of Tucker Carlson Tonight.
  - Elon Musk's SpaceX launches its first test flight of Starship. The device explodes shortly after launch.
- April 22 – The Supreme Court rules that pending trial, mifepristone can remain on US markets. The decision is seen as a victory for the national abortion-rights movement.
- April 23
  - Delaware legalizes recreational marijuana.
  - Bed Bath & Beyond files for Chapter 11 bankruptcy protection.
  - NBCUniversal CEO Jeff Shell is fired over an inappropriate relationship with an employee.
- April 24
  - Within minutes of each other, Fox News and CNN fire Tucker Carlson and Don Lemon respectively. Carlson's firing was a result of the Dominion lawsuit settlement, while Lemon's was because of numerous misogynistic comments made in the past.
- April 25 – President Biden formally announces his campaign for reelection in the 2024 United States presidential election.
- April 26 – Disney and Florida's Parental Rights in Education Act: Disney files suit against Ron DeSantis over "a targeted campaign of government retaliation".
- April 27 – The 2023 NFL draft is held in Kansas City, with Alabama quarterback Bryce Young being selected by the Carolina Panthers as the first overall pick.
- April 28 – A shooting occurs in Cleveland, Texas killing five, and the suspect is caught after four days.

=== May ===
- May 1
  - 2023 banking crisis: First Republic Bank fails and is seized by the FDIC, which auctions off the banks assets to JPMorgan Chase for $10.7 billion. First Republic becomes the fourth bank to fail since March and replaces Silicon Valley Bank as the second largest bank failure in US history.
  - Ron DeSantis signs a bill authorizing the use of the death penalty for convicted child rapists. The legislation is likely to be challenged for violating Supreme Court precedent.
  - A shooting takes place in Henryetta, Oklahoma, killing six after the suspect was supposed to stand for a jury trial regarding an accusation of sexting a minor.
- May 2
  - The 2023 Writers Guild of America strike begins due to unsuccessful pay raise negotiations. The strike halts the production of most movies and TV shows.
  - The last known fluent speaker of the Columbia-Moses language, Pauline Stensgar, dies at age 96, and the language became extinct.
- May 3
  - The Federal Reserve raises interest rates by 0.25 percent from 5 percent to 5.25 percent.
  - New York bans gas stoves and propane heating in new residential constructions. The bans take effect in 2026 for smaller residential buildings and 2029 for larger residential buildings.
  - Former Minneapolis Police officer Tou Thao is found guilty of second degree manslaughter in the murder of George Floyd.
  - A shooting takes place at a hospital in Midtown Atlanta killing one and injuring four. The perpetrator is caught after eight hours.
- May 4
  - Criminal proceedings in the January 6 United States Capitol attack: Four members of the Proud Boys who were at the January 6 attack, including founder Enrique Tarrio, are found guilty of several felony charges including seditious conspiracy.
  - A New York–based federal jury rules that Ed Sheeran did not steal parts of Marvin Gaye's song "Let's Get It On" and use it in his song "Thinking Out Loud".
- May 6 – Nine people are killed, including the perpetrator, after a mass shooting at a mall in Allen, Texas.
- May 7 – Eight people are killed after a vehicle drives into pedestrians outside a migrant center in Brownsville, Texas.
- May 9
  - A Manhattan-based federal civil jury finds that Trump sexually abused and defamed writer E. Jean Carroll in 1996, awarding her $5 million in damages.
  - U.S. Representative George Santos is indicted by federal prosecutors and charged with multiple counts of wire fraud, money laundering, and theft of private funds.
- May 11 – U.S. President Biden formally ends the declaration of COVID-19 pandemic in the country as a public health emergency.
- May 12 – The Title 42 expulsion policy expires at midnight, creating a question about whether a new immigration policy would be formed as a replacement. This comes as a surge of migrants gather at the U.S southern border.
- May 15
  - The National Institutes of Health begins a Phase 1 trial of an mRNA-based universal influenza vaccine.
  - Three are killed at a shooting in Farmington, New Mexico. Six others are wounded.
- May 16 – North Carolina's state legislature bans nearly all abortions after twelve weeks, overriding a veto by governor Roy Cooper.
- May 19
  - 2024 United States presidential election: Senator Tim Scott from South Carolina files to run in the 2024 Republican Party presidential primaries.
  - United States Attorney for the District of Massachusetts Rachael Rollins resigns after an ethics probe finds that she had grossly violated multiple policies and lied under oath.
- May 22 – Applied Materials announced plans to invest up to $4 billion in a semiconductor project in Sunnyvale, California.
- May 24 – DeSantis launches his campaign to run for President of the United States.
- May 27 – 2023 United States debt-ceiling crisis: House Republicans and the White House reach a deal to raise the debt ceiling and prevent the United States from defaulting.
- May 28 – The 107th running of the Indianapolis 500 is held, with Josef Newgarden wins his first Indy 500.
- May 30 – Nvidia becomes the first chipmaker valued at over $1 trillion, amid the ongoing AI boom.

=== June ===
- June 2
  - Mike Pence classified documents incident: The Department of Justice notified Pence that its investigation had ended and that the Department of Justice had decided not to charge him.
  - Fort Bragg, originally named for Confederate General Braxton Bragg, is renamed Fort Liberty.
- June 3 – 2023 United States debt-ceiling crisis: Biden signs the Fiscal Responsibility Act of 2023 into law in an effort to prevent the United States from entering a debt ceiling default.
- June 4 – A privately operated Cessna 560 Citation V carrying three passengers and a pilot crashed near the George Washington National Forest, Virginia killing everyone on board. The plane had strayed into restricted airspace and F16 jets were sent to intercept it. The pilots of the jets could see that the pilot of the plane was passed out.
- June 5
  - Oklahoma approves the first ever religious charter school in the United States.
  - Apple unveils a mixed-reality headset called the Vision Pro, its first new product category since the Apple Watch in 2015. The device is noted for its expected retail price of $3,499 that is considerably higher than other VR and AR headsets on the market.
- June 6
  - Wildfires in Quebec cause the air quality to deteriorate in the Northeast and part of the Midwest. Millions of Americans and Canadians are advised to wear N95 masks.
  - Former New Jersey governor Chris Christie announces his 2024 presidential campaign.
- June 7
  - Mike Pence announces his candidacy for President in the 2024 election.
  - North Dakota governor Doug Burgum announces his candidacy for President in the 2024 election.
  - CNN CEO Chris Licht departs the network after a 15,000 word profile disgracing Licht was published in The Atlantic.
- June 8
  - The Supreme Court rules in a 5–4 decision that Alabama must redraw its congressional map as it violates section 2 of the Voting Rights Act of 1965 in racially discriminating against African-Americans in the state.
  - Trump reveals on Truth Social that he has been indicted by Jack Smith's special counsel over mishandling of classified documents found at the FBI search of Mar-a-Lago. The following Tuesday, he pleaded not guilty before the court.
- June 9 – Lionel Messi announces he will join Major League Soccer's Inter Miami CF, turning down offers to stay at FC Barcelona and to join the Saudi Professional League. Debuting with and scoring for the team on July 21, the deal is seen as a blow to Saudi Arabia's sports ambitions, but a major boost to soccer in the United States ahead of the 2026 FIFA World Cup.
- June 12
  - The FTC files to block the proposed acquisition of Activision Blizzard by Microsoft.
  - Dick Clark Productions and Eldridge Industries acquire all rights and assets relating to the Golden Globe Awards. As a result, the Hollywood Foreign Press Association and its membership will be shuttered at a later date.
  - In basketball, the Denver Nuggets win the 2023 NBA Finals, their first NBA championship, in five games against the Miami Heat. Nikola Jokić wins NBA Finals MVP.
- June 13
  - A mass shooting in Denver injures 10 people celebrating the Nuggets championship.
  - In ice hockey, the Vegas Golden Knights defeat the Florida Panthers to win the 2023 Stanley Cup Final for their first Stanley Cup in franchise history. Jonathan Marchessault wins the Conn Smythe Trophy for playoffs MVP.
  - The City Council of Hamtramck, Michigan introduced a resolution prohibiting the display of all flags but the American flag and “nations’ flags that represent the international character of [the] City,” which many interpreted as an indirectly targeted ban of the rainbow flag on city property and sidewalks, which had previously been the source of controversy among some residents. Following three hours of public comment, the Council passed the resolution unanimously.
- June 15 – Chad Doerman kills three of his children but his wife and stepdaughter manage to escape. He was arrested later that day.
- June 18
  - An underwater submersible called Titan goes missing during a dive to visit the wreck site of the RMS Titanic with five people aboard. Four days later, a portion of the hull is discovered as a part of an American search-and-rescue operation, confirming the loss of the vessel as well as all five passengers on board.
  - A shooting takes place in Willowbrook, Illinois, during a Juneteenth celebration, killing one and injuring twenty-two.
  - The United States wins the 2023 CONCACAF Nations League final after defeating Canada 2–0.
- June 20 – Hunter Biden agrees to plead guilty to federal tax and firearms charges.
- June 20–26 – A series of tornado outbreaks across the United States kills eight people and injures over 126 others. This included a historic tornado outbreak on June 21 in Colorado.
- June 22 – Former U.S. representative from Texas Will Hurd launches his presidential campaign.
- June 24 – A freight train carrying hazardous materials derails, causing several cars to fall into the Yellowstone River.
- June 27
  - The Supreme Court rules in a 6–3 decision against the implementation of the independent state legislature theory.
  - The Supreme Court rules in a 7–2 decision that prosecutors must prove true threats be either reckless or made with subjective intention in order to convict.
  - Radio host Ryan Seacrest is announced to be the successor of Pat Sajak on Wheel of Fortune, approximately two weeks after Sajak announced his retirement effective in 2024.
- June 29
  - The Supreme Court rules that affirmative action in university admissions violates the Equal Protection Clause in the 14th Amendment. The court rules 6-2 in Students for Fair Admissions v. Harvard.
  - Mike Pence makes a surprise visit to Ukraine, meeting with Zelenskyy and touring both Kyiv and Iprin.
- June 30
  - The Supreme Court rules in a 6–3 decision that the HEROES Act does not grant the president the right to forgive student debts.
  - The Supreme Court rules in a 6–3 decision that the First Amendment prohibits states from forcing website designers to create designs they disagree with. The decision is seen as a victory for religious conservatives and free speech advocates but a setback for LGBT+ rights.
  - The Skyline light rail formally opens in Honolulu, Hawaii. It is the first major metro system in the United States that has platform screen doors built into its stations.
  - Apple Inc. closes with a market capitalization above $3 trillion for the first time, becoming the only public company to do so as of yet. (Note: Apple previously hit a $3 trillion market cap in January 2022, though this lasted only in intra-day trading.)

=== July ===
- July 1 – Question 4 takes effect in Maryland, legalizing cannabis for recreational use in the state; the first licensed sales take place the same day.
- July 2
  - A mass shooting takes place in Baltimore, Maryland, killing two and injuring twenty-eight.
  - A small bag of cocaine is discovered in the West Wing of the White House, leading to a Secret Service investigation.
- July 3 – A mass shooting takes place in Philadelphia, Pennsylvania, killing five and injuring two. The suspect was arrested later that day.
- July 5
  - Meta Platforms launches Threads as a direct competitor to Twitter.
  - Stop the Steal lawyer L. Lin Wood announces that he will relinquish his law license in Georgia in an effort to avoid disbarment.
- July 6–9 – Treasury Secretary Janet Yellen visits Beijing with the intent to reduce tensions in Chinese American relations.
- July 7
  - Patrick Crusius, the man who killed 23 people at an El Paso Walmart in 2019 is sentenced to 90 consecutive life sentences, the second longest prison sentence in American history and trailing only Oklahoma City Bombing accomplice Terry Nichols.
  - A state judge in Oklahoma dismisses a lawsuit by the last three known survivors of the 1921 Tulsa race massacre for reparations.
- July 9–11 – A series of destructive floods strike the Northeast after a heavy rainstorm.
- July 11 – Bank of America is ordered by the CFPB to pay $253.4 million, including a $150 million fine, for deceptive practices and misuse of overdraft fees.
- July 13 – The FDA announces that the birth control pill Norgestrel, also known as Opill, will be available without a prescription.
- July 14
  - SAG-AFTRA begins an ongoing strike after the national board failed to reach an agreement with the Alliance of Motion Picture and Television Producers, bringing Hollywood to a standstill for the first time since 1960 with the ongoing writer's strike.
  - New York authorities announce that a suspect has been arrested and charged with three murders in connection with the ongoing Gilgo Beach serial killings case from 2010.
  - Four people, including three police officers are shot in Fargo, North Dakota, killing one of the officers and wounding the others. The suspect was shot dead in a shootout.
- July 16 – Mexico wins the 2023 CONCACAF Gold Cup Final against Panama 1–0 at SoFi Stadium in Inglewood, California.
- July 17 – The FDA approves the drug Nirsevimab, also known as Beyfortus, which treats RSV in infants.
- July 18 – Michigan Attorney General Dana Nessel announces charges against 16 pro-Trump "fake electors" who attempted to overturn Biden’s victory in the state during the 2020 election.
- July 21 – Warner Bros.' Barbie and Universal's Oppenheimer are both released, causing the Barbenheimer cultural phenomenon, which encouraged moviegoers to see both films as a double feature. The two movies end up being the highest and third highest grossing movies of the year, respectively.
- July 26
  - In response to many automakers adopting Tesla's North American Charging System, a consortium composing of Mercedes-Benz, Honda, Kia, Hyundai, General Motors, BMW and Stellantis announce the formation of their own charging network which will feature Tesla and CCS plugs.
  - The Federal Reserve raises interest rates by 0.25 percent to their highest levels since 2001.
- July 27 – Federal prosecution of Donald Trump: Special counsel Jack Smith charges Mar-a-Lago maintenance chief Carlos de Oliveira and levies additional charges against Walt Nauta and Trump.
- July 31 – The Vogtle Electric Generating Plant begins operations at its unit 3 reactor, America's first new nuclear reactor in seven years.

=== August ===
- August 1
  - Donald Trump is indicted for a third time by a grand jury for his attempts to overturn the 2020 election and the subsequent January 6 attack.
  - Fitch Ratings downgrades its US debt rating from AAA to AA+, citing "deteriorating standard of governance".
  - Cannabis legalization takes effect in Minnesota; Minnesota becomes the 23rd state and 27th U.S. jurisdiction overall to legalize cannabis for recreational use.
- August 3 – Pittsburgh synagogue shooting: Perpetrator Robert Gregory Bowers is sentenced to the death penalty.
- August 4 – Riots break out in New York City's Union Square during a PS5 giveaway hosted by internet streamer Kai Cenat. Dozens of people are arrested, including Cenat himself, and several police officers are injured.
- August 5 – A large brawl occurs on Montgomery's Riverfront dock.
- August 6 – At the 2023 FIFA Women's World Cup, the United States loses in the Round of 16 to Sweden 5–4 in penalties after tying 0–0, making it the first time in the Women's World Cup that the United States failed to reach either the quarterfinals or the semifinals.
- August 7 – Former Minneapolis police officer Tou Thao is sentenced to four years and nine months in prison for his actions in the murder of George Floyd.
- August 8–11 – Wildfires caused by high winds from Hurricane Dora strike the island of Maui in Hawaii, almost completely destroying the town of Lahaina. As of August 25, 115 people have been killed, 67 have been injured, over 380 people are missing, and 2,207 buildings have been destroyed. It marks the deadliest wildfire in the last 100 years.
- August 9 – Taylor Swift completes the first U.S. leg of The Eras Tour at SoFi Stadium in Los Angeles, which has had a wide impact on the United States economy and culture.
- August 10
  - The United States House Subcommittee on Government Operations and the Federal Workforce holds a televised investigative hearing on the federal government's response to and overall recovery efforts from Hurricane Ian, which struck Florida in September 2022.
  - Tapestry, owner of Kate Spade and Coach, announces it will buy Capri Holdings, owner of Michael Kors, Versace and Jimmy Choo, for $8.5 billion in cash.
- August 11
  - The United States reports it recorded its highest number of suicides in 2022, with 49,449 people taking their own lives, making it the deadliest suicide rate in the country since World War II.
  - Attorney General Merrick Garland appoints David Weiss as special counsel to investigate Hunter Biden, son of President Joe Biden.
- August 14 – Trump is indicted in Atlanta on 13 counts including racketeering for his attempts to overturn President Biden's victory in Georgia during the 2020 election. Indictments are also announced against 18 Trump associates.
- August 18 – American–Japanese–Korean trilateral pact: The United States, Japan, and South Korea agree to sign a trilateral pact at Camp David, Maryland.
- August 20 – Hurricane Hilary makes landfall in Southern California causing widespread flooding and thousands of power outages, making it the first major tropical storm to impact the region and the first to strike California since 1939.
- August 23
  - South Carolina's Supreme Court reverses its earlier prohibition on a six-week abortion ban, and allows the ban to come into effect.
  - A shooting occurs at the historic biker bar Cook's Corner in Trabuco Canyon, California, leaving four dead, including the suspect, and six others injured.
  - 2024 Republican Party presidential primaries – The Republican National Committee holds the first primary debate in Milwaukee, Wisconsin.
- August 24
  - Four tornadoes touch down in Southern Michigan, killing five people.
  - The mug shot of Donald Trump is taken at Fulton County Jail in Atlanta. Trump is the first former United States president to have a mug shot.
- August 26 – 2023 Jacksonville shooting: A man killed three people before committing suicide at a Dollar General store in Jacksonville, Florida. The motive is believed to be racial hatred.
- August 28
  - Zijie Yan, a professor at UNC Chapel Hill is murdered by one of his graduate students.
  - Google announced plans to invest $1.7 billion into its current and future Ohio data centers.
- August 30 – Hurricane Idalia makes landfall at 7:45am EDT with 125 mph winds near Keaton Beach, Florida. It is the first major hurricane on record to impact the Big Bend of Florida.
- August 31 – Proud Boys leader Joe Biggs is sentenced to 17 years in federal prison for his actions in the January 6 United States Capitol attack.

=== September ===
- September 1 – Two more Proud Boys, leader Ethan Nordean and member Dominic Pezzola, are sentenced to 18 and 10 years respectively for their actions in the January 6 Capitol attack.
- September 5
  - New York City Local Law 18 comes into effect, which effectively bans Airbnb from doing business within city limits.
  - Ex-Proud Boys leader Enrique Tarrio is sentenced to 22 years in prison for his part in the January 6 Capitol attack.
- September 6 – Geologists report the discovery of what may be the largest known deposit of lithium, located in the crater of a dormant volcano along the Nevada–Oregon border, and estimated to contain 20 to 40 million tonnes of the metal.
- September 7
  - Former Trump administration economic adviser Peter Navarro is found guilty of contempt of Congress for failing to comply with a congressional subpoena issued by the January 6 committee related to the attack on the Capitol.
- September 8 – Gotion High-tech Co. announced plans to set up a $2 billion electric vehicle (EV) lithium battery manufacturing plant in Illinois.
- September 9 – Coco Gauff wins the women's singles in the US Open, making her the first teenager to win the title since Serena Williams in 1999.
- September 10 – The US national FIBA team gets fourth place at the 2023 FIBA Basketball World Cup after losing to Canada 127–118 in overtime.
- September 11 – Hostess Brands announces it will be bought by The J.M. Smucker Company in a $5.6 billion cash and stock deal.
- September 14
  - Caesars Entertainment and MGM Resorts announce their computer systems have been hacked by the group Scattered Spider.
  - Hunter Biden, son of President Biden, is indicted on federal gun charges.
- September 15 – The United Auto Workers begin a strike against the big three American automakers of Ford, General Motors, and Stellantis.
- September 17 – In ice hockey, Mike Babcock resigns as the head coach of the Columbus Blue Jackets following an NHL Players Association investigation into his alleged requests for personal photos of players.
- September 18 – The Linac Coherent Light Source at the SLAC National Accelerator Laboratory is upgraded to LCLS-II and successfully demonstrates its first X-rays, which are 10,000 times brighter than the previous version.
- September 19 – Instacart makes a highly-watched initial public offering on the Nasdaq, with the new stock ticker CART. One of the biggest IPOs of the past two years, the company falls below its IPO price of $30 per share the day after it opens.
- September 20
  - The national debt rises to $33 trillion.
  - The Senate confirms Charles Q. Brown Jr. as the next Chairman of the Joint Chiefs of Staff, overcoming a protest set by Alabama GOP senator Tommy Tuberville.
- September 21 – Media mogul Rupert Murdoch announces his retirement and plan to hand off his businesses, News Corp and Fox, over to his son Lachlan.
- September 22
  - Senator Bob Menendez from New Jersey is indicted on federal corruption charges.
  - Brightline opens its long-awaited extension from West Palm Beach to Orlando International Airport.
- September 25
  - The Biden administration recognizes the Cook Islands and Niue as sovereign states, establishing formal relations between both Pacific island countries.
  - Transportation Secretary Pete Buttigieg announces a $1.4 billion investment in the nation's railroad network to improve safety and capacity, mostly funded by the Infrastructure Investment and Jobs Act.
- September 26
  - The FTC and 17 states file an antitrust suit against Amazon for monopolistic practices.
  - New York civil investigation of The Trump Organization - New York judge Arthur Engoron rules that Trump and his organization persistently committed fraud and inflated his wealth to achieve favorable loans and devalued the worth of his assets to pay lower taxes to the IRS.
- September 27
  - The second Republican presidential primary debate takes place at the Ronald Reagan Presidential Library in Simi Valley, California.
  - The WGA Strike comes to an end at 12:01 AM PDT after a tentative agreement is reached three days earlier.
- September 26 – AWS announced plans for additional data centers in New Albany and a $3.5 billion investment by 2030.
- September 29
  - Floods across the New York metropolitan area occur with more than 6 inches (150 mm) of rain in less than 12 hours.
  - Sixty-year-old Duane Davis, a former gang leader, is arrested and charged with the 1996 murder of famed rapper Tupac Shakur.
- September 30 – 2023 Major League Baseball postseason: Following a 7–3 Miami Marlins victory against the Pittsburgh Pirates, Kim Ng becomes the first female general manager to lead a playoff team in Major League Baseball history.

=== October ===
- October 1 – California Governor Gavin Newsom appoints Laphonza Butler to fill the U.S. Senate seat left vacant by the death of Dianne Feinstein.
- October 3 – Kevin McCarthy is ousted as Speaker of the House, marking the first removal of a speaker by a vote in the House. Eight Republicans, led by Matt Gaetz, join all present Democrats voting to remove in a 216–210 vote.
- October 4 – LG Energy Solution announced a $3 billion investment in its Michigan battery manufacturing plant, part of a new lithium battery supply deal with Toyota.
- October 9 – Defense Secretary Lloyd Austin orders the deployment of a carrier strike group led by the aircraft carrier USS Gerald R. Ford to the Eastern Mediterranean in response to October 7 attacks. The group also includes the cruiser USS Normandy and the destroyers USS Thomas Hudner, USS Ramage, USS Carney, and USS Roosevelt.
- October 11 – ExxonMobil announces it will acquire Pioneer Natural Resources in a $60 billion all-stock deal, the largest in the energy industry in nearly two decades.
- October 12 – One officer responsible for arresting Elijah McClain is acquitted, while the other is convicted of criminally negligent homicide.
- October 13 – NASA launches its Psyche mission to visit the large metallic asteroid 16 Psyche.
- October 14 – An annular solar eclipse takes place across the Southwestern United States.
- October 15
  - Rite Aid files for Chapter 11 bankruptcy protection after losing $3.45 billion attributed to lawsuits related to the opioid epidemic.
  - A man kills a six-year-old Palestinian Muslim boy and seriously injures his mother in Plainfield Township, Illinois. The perpetrator, who was the victims' landlord, states he was motivated by the ongoing Israel–Gaza war.
  - Twenty-one species in the United States are declared extinct by the US Fish and Wildlife Service. These are one mammal, ten birds, two fish, and eight mussels.
- October 17 – Detroit casino workers call the first strike in their history after failing to reach a deal with MGM Resorts and Penn Entertainment.
- October 18
  - A driver is arrested after crashing into a group of Pepperdine University students walking in Malibu, California, killing four and injuring two others.
  - The U.S. Treasury Department announces an ease of certain oil, gas, and gold sanctions on Venezuela following the Venezuelan government and opposition's agreement to conduct elections.
  - Dutch serial killer Joran van der Sloot confesses in a U.S. federal court that he killed Natalee Holloway in Aruba in 2005.
- October 19 – 2020 Georgia election investigation: Attorney Sidney Powell pleads guilty in the Georgia election racketeering prosecution for her role in attempting to overturn the results; she is joined by fellow attorneys Kenneth Chesebro the following day, and by attorney Jenna Ellis on October 24.
- October 20
  - October 2023 Speaker of the United States House of Representatives election: Jim Jordan withdraws his nomination to become the Speaker of the United States House of Representatives after a third vote fails to elevate him to the position.
  - Federal bankruptcy judge Christopher Lopez rules that Alex Jones cannot use his personal bankruptcy to avoid paying roughly $1.1 billion in damages resulting from the lawsuits over his conspiracy theories and lies about the Sandy Hook Elementary School shooting.
- October 21 – Chevron announces it will acquire Hess Corporation for $50 billion.
- October 23 – Horizon Air Flight 2059: An off-duty pilot reportedly attempts to hijack and crash a passenger plane traveling from Everett, Washington, to San Francisco, California.
- October 24
  - The Georgia Supreme Court upholds the state's six-week abortion ban.
  - October Speaker of the House election: The GOP choose Tom Emmer as their nominee for Speaker of the House, only for Emmer to drop out of the race mere hours after nomination. The party reconvenes later that evening and nominates Mike Johnson of Louisiana, who wins the office the next day.
  - Meta Platforms is sued by the attorneys general of 41 state and DC. They accuse the social media giant of harming children's health; 33 are under a joint lawsuit in California and the remaining eight states and DC sue in their own jurisdictions.
- October 25
  - A mass shooting occurs in Lewiston, Maine, killing at least 18 and injuring a further 13 in the deadliest mass shooting of the year so far. The suspect is found dead from a self-inflicted gunshot wound two days later.
  - Hyundai and LG Energy Solution announced plans to invest $7.6 billion in a new factory in the US.
- October 27 – A retired Colombian army officer who participated in the 2021 assassination of Haitian president Jovenel Moïse is sentenced by a court to life imprisonment in Miami.
- October 26 – QTS announced plans to invest $1.5 billion in New Albany, constructing four new data centers.
- October 28 – Mike Pence suspends his campaign for the Republican Party presidential nomination for the upcoming 2024 election.
- October 29 – 2023 Ybor City shootings: Two people are killed and 16 others are injured in a mass shooting in the Ybor City neighborhood of Tampa, Florida. A 22-year-old man is arrested.
- October 30
  - 2023 United Auto Workers strike: The UAW reaches a tentative deal with General Motors after making tentative agreements with Stellantis and Ford, officially ending the strike.
  - Walmart announced a $9 billion investment over the next two years to upgrade and modernize more than 1,400 of its stores.

=== November ===
- November 1 – 2023 Major League Baseball season – The Texas Rangers win their first World Series after defeating the Arizona Diamondbacks in five games.
- DC Blox announces plans to build a data center campus in Douglasville, Georgia, with an investment exceeding $1.2 billion.
- November 2
  - Six Flags and Cedar Fair, two of the largest amusement park companies in the United States, announce that they are planning to merge. The future new company will be called Six Flags, however it will be publicly traded under Cedar Fair's current ticker symbol, FUN.
  - United States v. Bankman-Fried – FTX founder Sam Bankman-Fried is convicted by a jury on all seven fraud-related counts.
  - Biden calls for a "pause" in the Gaza war to allow for hostages to get out and humanitarian aid to get in.
  - PragerU runs a $1,000,000 "timeline takeover" advertising campaign on X for their short documentary film DeTrans.
- November 4 – 2023 Israel–Hamas war protests in the United States – The National March on Washington: Free Palestine takes place at the National Mall and attracts between 100,000 to 300,000 participants with the goal of reaching a ceasefire in Gaza amid the ongoing war.
- November 5 – Antisemitism during the Gaza war – Paul Kessler, a 69-year-old Jewish man, is fatally injured during a confrontation between pro-Israeli and pro-Palestinian demonstrators in Thousand Oaks, California. Local authorities consider the case as an anti-Semitic hate crime.
- November 6 – WeWork, once the most valuable U.S. startup, files for Chapter 11 bankruptcy with liabilities of up to $50 billion.
- November 7
  - A massive fire breaks out in Hangar No. 1 at the former Marine Corps Air Station Tustin in Tustin, California.
  - Toyota announces it will invest an additional $8 billion in its first North American electric vehicle battery manufacturing facility, as announced by the Economic Development Partnership of North Carolina, adding another 3,000 jobs.
- November 9
  - SAG-AFTRA ends its strike at 12:01 a.m. PDT following a tentative deal reached the day prior.
  - Surgeons at NYU Langone Health announce the world's first whole eye transplant.
- November 10 – The Big Ten Conference suspends Michigan Wolverines football head coach Jim Harbaugh from the team's final three regular season games due to a sign stealing scandal.
- November 12 – Senator Tim Scott suspends his campaign for president.
- November 14 – 2023 Israel–Hamas war protests in the United States – The March for Israel rally takes place at the National Mall in Washington, D.C. to support Israel amid its war against Hamas, to call for the release of hostages held by Hamas, and to combat rising antisemitism. The rally attracts 290,000 people in person and 250,000 people through livestream.
- November 14–17 – Biden hosts the APEC summit in San Francisco; Chinese president Xi Jinping attends the event, marking the first time since 2017 that Xi has set foot in the United States. Both countries at the conclusion of the summit agree to re-open suspended channels of military communications and to cooperate in their fight against climate change.
- November 17 – Ford announced plans to invest nearly $2 billion in its Louisville plants as part of a UAW labor deal.
- November 16 – George Santos says he will not seek re-election after the House Ethics Committee issued a scathing report against him, which led to him being charged with several counts of fraud.
- November 17 – Sam Altman, the founder and CEO of ChatGPT developer OpenAI, is fired by OpenAI's board for reportedly lying to its board of directors, though he is reinstated five days later after OpenAI investor Microsoft announces its intention to hire Altman as well as OpenAI cofounder Greg Brockman after the latter's resignation in protest of the board.
- November 20 – The US men's national soccer team qualifies for the 2024 Copa América, which will be hosted in the United States.
- November 21 – Gaza war hostage crisis – A deal brokered by the US, Egypt, and Qatar sees the release of 50 Hamas-held hostages, including American citizens, held in Gaza.
- November 22
  - The FTC proposes a ban on cord-cutting fees instated by cable companies as part of Biden's ongoing campaign against junk fees.
  - 2023 Rainbow Bridge explosion – A car crashes into a border checkpoint structure and explodes on the Rainbow Bridge in Niagara Falls, New York, killing both occupants and injuring a U.S. Customs and Border Protection officer.
- November 23 – Pro–Palestinian protesters disrupt the Macy's Thanksgiving Day Parade in three locations by wearing white jumpsuits covered in fake blood and gluing themselves to the parade route.
- November 25 – Anti-Palestinian racism during the Gaza war – Three Palestinian students are shot and injured in Burlington, Vermont while on Thanksgiving break after the suspect harasses them for speaking Arabic and wearing keffiyehs to show solidarity with Palestine amid the ongoing war in Gaza.
- November 28
  - A tribute service for Rosalynn Carter, who died nine days earlier, is held, attended by all living former first ladies, President and First Lady Biden, Vice President Harris, Second Gentleman Emhoff, and former presidents Bill Clinton and Jimmy Carter. Her official funeral was held one day later at the Carter's home church in Plains, Georgia.
  - Dallas Mavericks owner Mark Cuban announces his intention to sell his stake in the team to Miriam Adelson for $3.5 billion, who is selling roughly ten percent of her stake in her late husband Sheldon's company Las Vegas Sands to finance part of her purchase.
  - Mayo Clinic announced a $5 billion expansion of its Minnesota campus.
- November 29 – The US alleges a plot by the Indian government to assassinate the New York–based Sikh separatist Gurpatwant Singh Pannun, a spokesperson for the pro-Khalistan group Sikhs for Justice. An Indian government employee is the target of an indictment in New York for their alleged role in the assassination plot.
- November 30
  - Amkor Technology announces plans to build a $2 billion semiconductor advanced packaging facility in Phoenix, Arizona. The project is expected to generate up to 2,000 jobs.
  - Elon Musk holds an event in Texas to kick off distribution of the Tesla Cybertruck.

=== December ===
- December 1 – The House votes 311–114 to expel George Santos on fraud and corruption allegations, the first congressional expulsion since James Traficant in 2002.
- December 3 – Alaska Airlines announces it has agreed to buy Hawaiian Airlines for $1.9 billion, a deal yet to be approved by regulators.
- December 4 – North Dakota governor Doug Burgum suspends his 2024 campaign for president.
- December 5
  - 2023 United States Congress hearing on antisemitism: The United States House Committee on Education held a hearing on antisemitism, in which the presidents of three major universities, Claudine Gay of Harvard University, Liz Magill of the University of Pennsylvania, and Sally Kornbluth of the Massachusetts Institute of Technology, were called to testify.
  - 2023 Austin shootings: A man is arrested for six counts of murder and three counts of attempted murder after a shooting spree which began in Austin, Texas and continued in Bexar County.
- December 6 – 2023 UNLV shooting: A suspect kills three people and injures one other in a shooting spree before dying in a shootout with police.
- December 7
  - The Federal Permitting Improvement Steering Council gives final approval to a new offshore wind farm near Rhode Island.
  - 2023–24 NHL season: The Los Angeles Kings set a new record for opening road wins at 11 following their 4–0 victory against the Montreal Canadiens.
- December 8
  - Taylor Swift's The Eras Tour becomes the first tour to gross over one billion dollars, making it the highest-grossing tour and Swift the first artist to reach the one billion mark.
  - Ethan Crumbley, the perpetrator of the 2021 Oxford High School shooting that killed four and injured seven, is sentenced to life without parole.
  - The FDA approves the two gene therapies for sickle cell disease.
- December 9
  - In baseball, Japanese pitcher and designated hitter Shohei Ohtani announces on Instagram that he has signed a 10-year, $700 million deal with the MLB's Los Angeles Dodgers after spending the first six seasons with the Los Angeles Angels.
  - 2023 Major League Soccer season: The Columbus Crew win 2–1 against Los Angeles FC in MLS Cup 2023 and win their third MLS Cup in franchise history.
  - 2023–24 NBA season: The Los Angeles Lakers win the first NBA In-Season Tournament, defeating the Indiana Pacers 123–109.
  - A tornado outbreak in Tennessee, Kentucky, and Mississippi leaves seven dead, 71 injured, and 35,000 without electricity.
  - Liz Magill resigns as the president of the University of Pennsylvania due to backlash towards her testimony about antisemitism at the institution during a House Committee on Education and the Workforce hearing.
- December 12 – The New York state governor announces plans for a $10 billion chip research center involving IBM, Micron, and other partners.
- December 13
  - Tesla issues a recall for 2 million cars due to an autopilot defect, after a 2-year investigation into crashes involving the feature. The cars must all receive a software update to fix the issue.
  - NASA announces that Voyager 1 has stopped sending information to Earth due to a technical issue.
- December 15 – Rudy Giuliani is ordered to pay over $148 million in a defamation case brought by two Georgia election workers, relating to statements that he made during the 2020 election.
- December 18
  - Nippon Steel announces its agreement to acquire U.S. Steel for $14.1 billion. The company will retain its name and maintain its headquarters in Pittsburgh.
  - Operation Prosperity Guardian is launched by the United States alongside the United Kingdom, Bahrain, Canada, France, Greece, Italy, the Netherlands, Norway, Seychelles, and Spain to protect and escort ships in the Red Sea from Houthi attacks.
- December 19
  - The Colorado Supreme Court removes Trump from the state's 2024 Republican primary due to the Fourteenth Amendment's ban on candidates who engage in insurrections. One week later, the Colorado Republican Party appeals to the Supreme Court of the United States.
  - The Missouri Supreme Court strikes down a state law which criminalizes homeless residence on state land as well as unanimously striking down another state law which bans COVID-19 vaccine mandates for public workers.
- December 21 – Waaree announces plans to invest up to $1 billion over the next four years to scale its facility in Houston, Texas.
- December 24 – 2023 NFL season: The Detroit Lions win their first divisional title in 30 years.
- December 26 – 2023–24 NBA season: The Detroit Pistons break the single-season record for the most losses in a National Basketball Association regular season with 27 consecutive losses, surpassing the records set by the 2010–11 Cleveland Cavaliers and 2013–14 Philadelphia 76ers.
- December 28 – Maine Secretary of State Shenna Bellows blocks Trump from running in the state's 2024 Republican primary due to the 14th Amendment's insurrection clause.

== See also ==
- 2023 in American music
- 2023 in American soccer
- 2023 in American television
- List of American films of 2023
- List of mass shootings in the United States in 2023
- List of people executed in the United States in 2023
- Timeline of the 2024 United States presidential election
