= 2023 Montana high-altitude object =

2023 Montana high-altitude object may refer to:

- 2023 Chinese balloon incident, a high-altitude Chinese balloon that floated over North America from January to February, overflying Montana on February 1, with many ground observations of it from Montanans, later shot down off the East Coast on February 4
- 2023 Lake Huron high-altitude object, a February 11th radar detection originating in Montana, resulting in a shootdown the following day over Lake Huron
