= 2023 Lake Huron high-altitude object =

Shootdown of unidentified object

- Approximate location where the object was shot down.
- Date: February 12, 2023
- Location: Lake Huron
- Type: Airspace violation
- Outcome: Downed by AIM-9 Sidewinder missile fired by U.S. Air National Guard F-16C fighter aircraft

On February 11, 2023, an octagonal unidentified flying object was detected over northern Montana. It disappeared until it was spotted the next day in Wisconsin, flying at 20,000 feet (6,100 m) over the Upper Peninsula of Michigan. The object was tracked by NORAD.

The object was shot down over Lake Huron by order of U.S. President Joe Biden on February 12, by an AIM-9 Sidewinder missile fired from a Minnesota Air National Guard F-16.

On February 16, 2023, the Royal Canadian Mounted Police announced that the search for the object had been suspended due to deteriorating weather and low chance of recovery. However, documents made available to the public in November 2024 revealed that debris had been recovered and that the object was "from a company who sells weather monitoring equipment."

== Background ==
The object was detected on February 12, one week after a Chinese balloon was shot down by a U.S. Air Force F-22 off the coast of South Carolina, after the balloon was tracked over the contiguous United States.

Melissa Dalton, Assistant Secretary of Defense for Homeland Defense, said that after the earlier event, the U.S. had been "more closely scrutinizing our airspace at these altitudes, including enhancing our radar, which may at least partly explain the increase" in objects detected and shot down. NORAD commander General Glen VanHerck, said that U.S. radar adjustments had allowed the U.S. to better categorize and track slower-moving objects. VanHerck said that in 2021, up to 98% of radar data was not routinely analyzed, because the military aimed to filter out radio signal noise (such as flocks of birds or weather balloons); after the Chinese spy balloon intrusion, the U.S. stepped up its radar monitoring using adjustments "to give us better fidelity on seeing smaller objects."

The object was also detected the same day as the shootdown of a high-altitude object over Yukon, Canada, and one day after another high-altitude object was shot down over northern Alaska.

== Capabilities, origin, and description ==
The object was unmanned and was reportedly octagonal in shape. The object reportedly had strings hanging off it.

A spokesman for the National Security Council said that the object was unmanned, and uncontrolled; lacking self-propulsion, it apparently moved with prevailing winds. The NSC spokesman also said that the object did not emit communication signals.

Brigadier General Pat Ryder, the press secretary for the Department of Defense, said that the U.S. military "did not assess" the object to be a "kinetic military threat to anything on the ground," but did "assess it was a safety flight hazard and a threat due to its potential surveillance capabilities."

On February 14, after the object was shot down, White House spokesman John Kirby told reporters that the US had found no evidence to connect that object to any country's spying program, and that the U.S. Intelligence Community "will not dismiss as a possibility that these could be balloons that were simply tied to commercial or research entities and therefore benign. That very well could be, or could emerge, as a leading explanation here."

== Detection and flight path ==
On February 11, 2023, United States Northern Command (NORTHCOM) detected an object over Havre, Montana, near sensitive military sites. The Federal Aviation Administration briefly closed the airspace over the city; no threatening object was detected over Montana, and it was initially thought to be a potential radar anomaly. Canadian authorities added that the object was first detected above Alberta.

The object was detected on radar over Montana on February 11 and was seen again on radar over Wisconsin and the Upper Peninsula of Michigan on February 12, traveling at about 20,000 feet (6,100 m)

Ryder said that North American Aerospace Defense Command (NORAD) had "maintained visual and radar tracking" of the object since the morning of February 12, and that "Based on its flight path and data we can reasonably connect this object to the radar signal picked up over Montana, which flew in proximity to sensitive DOD sites".

== Shootdown ==
On February 12, U.S. President Joe Biden directed that an object over Lake Huron, believed to be a balloon, be shot down "out of an abundance of caution and at the recommendation of military leaders". It was shot down that day by an AIM-9 Sidewinder fired from a Minnesota Air National Guard F-16 Viper over Lake Huron on the Canada–US border at 2:42 pm CST. A Sidewinder missile fired earlier had missed its target and landed in Lake Huron.

The F-16s deployed to shoot down the object were Duluth, Minnesota-based fighters from the Minnesota Air National Guard's 148th Fighter Wing, which took off from an airfield in Madison, Wisconsin.

Ahead of the shootdown, the airspace over parts of Door County, Wisconsin, northern Lake Michigan and northern Michigan was briefly closed to civilian aircraft with a temporary flight restriction (TFR) for national security operations. After that TFR was lifted, the FAA and military authorities imposed a similar restriction on Lake Huron to the east. Some Canadian airspace near Tobermory, Ontario was also closed. A press release from the Pentagon said that "The location chosen for this shoot down afforded us the opportunity to avoid impact to people on the ground while improving chances for debris recovery."

== Recovery operations ==
The object fell in Lake Huron approximately 15 nautical miles (17 mi; 28 km) from the shores of the Upper Peninsula of Michigan, likely in deep waters.

According to NORAD commander VanHerck, the object likely fell in Canadian waters. Searches for the wreckage were complicated by the depth of the mid-lake boundary waters as well as 12-foot (3.7 m) wave swells and wind gusts up to 30 knots (35 mph; 56 km/h) on the day following the object's downing.

On February 16, 2023, the Royal Canadian Mounted Police announced that the search for the object had been suspended due to deteriorating weather and low chance of recovery.

Documents released in November 2024 revealed that debris from the Lake Huron object had been recovered and that the object was "from a company who sells weather monitoring equipment."

== Reactions ==
Michigan Governor Gretchen Whitmer said she was "glad to report" that the object had been "swiftly, safely and securely taken down" over the lake. Minnesota Governor Tim Walz said he was proud of the Minnesota Air National Guard airmen who "executed their mission flawlessly, protected the homeland, and got the birds home safe."

Canadian Minister of National Defence Anita Anand said: "We unequivocally support this action, and we'll continue to work with the US and NORAD to protect North America."

== See also ==
- List of high-altitude object events in 2023
