= 2023 Shandong high-altitude object =

High altitude object around coastal waters of mainland China

On February 12, 2023, an unidentified object was allegedly spotted by Chinese maritime authorities over the Yellow Sea, inside the territorial waters of China's Shandong province, nearest the coastal city of Rizhao, which is located within the Qingdao metropolitan area. China announced plans to shoot down the object but did not release further details on February 12 regarding the outcome of the planned operation.

Chinese authorities believed that the object threatened the security of Qingdao's port, home to Jianggezhuang, a major PLA naval base. Jianggezhuang is the command center of China's North Sea Fleet, home to nuclear attack submarines and the aircraft carrier, Liaoning.

Although there were no new updates from state media on the day that followed the object's sighting, it had become a top trending topic on Chinese social media, with millions of views. China did not specify the type or source of the alleged object, or its altitude. It was unclear whether Chinese authorities had shot down the alleged object. Local fishing vessels were sent text alerts asking for their assistance in debris recovery and the collection of photographic evidence after being told to clear the seas underneath the affected airspace.

== See also ==
- List of high-altitude object events in 2023
