= List of high-altitude object events in 2023 =

Several high-altitude airspace security events were reported in February 2023, initially over North America, then over Latin America, China, and Eastern Europe.

== North American sightings ==
Approximate location where objects were shot down over North America

After the sightings of a Chinese balloon in 2023 (later shot down off the coast of South Carolina), the U.S. began more closely scrutinizing its airspace at high altitudes, including by radar enhancements that allowed the U.S. to better categorize and track slower-moving objects. General Glen VanHerck, the commander of NORAD, said that in 2021, up to 98% of raw radar data was not routinely analyzed, because the military aimed to filter out radio signal emanating from flocks of birds or weather balloons (as opposed to potential threats). VanHerck said that the U.S. adjustments to radar monitoring in 2023, after the Chinese balloon intrusion, gave the U.S. "better fidelity on seeing smaller objects." The U.S. radar adjustments and increased vigilance increased the detection of objects. It remains unknown when state-actor balloon incursions had begun.

On February 14, after unidentified high-altitude objects had been detected and shot down over northern Alaska, Yukon, and Lake Huron, White House spokesman John Kirby said that the U.S. Intelligence Community "will not dismiss as a possibility that these could be balloons that were simply tied to commercial or research entities and therefore benign. That very well could be, or could emerge, as a leading explanation here." The downing of the Yukon object, on February 11, 2023, marked the first deployment of NORAD to down an aerial object within the 64-year history of the US-Canadian aerospace warning and air sovereignty organization. The objects shot down over northern Alaska, Yukon, and Lake Huron were all smaller than the Chinese balloon shot down over South Carolina. A report by The Guardian on 17 February suggested that one of the objects "may have been amateur hobbyists’ $12 balloon."

When asked about possible extraterrestrial origin of the three objects downed over North America between February 9–12, General VanHerck said he personally had not "ruled out anything", but he deferred to U.S. intelligence experts.

== Recovery operations ==
Since several of the objects were downed in relatively inaccessible locations, ranging from sea ice off the Arctic Ocean coast of Alaska to remote alpine terrain in Yukon and deep US-Canada boundary waters in the middle of Lake Huron, recovery efforts have required considerable amounts of coordination and care.

On February 16, 2023, the Royal Canadian Mounted Police announced that the search for the Lake Huron object had been suspended due to deteriorating weather and low chance of recovery.

On February 16, 2023 at about 11 a.m., a suspected weather balloon believed to have originated in China was discovered at a shooting range on Dongyin, Lienchiang, Taiwan.

On February 18, 2023, it was reported that the searches for the Alaska, Yukon and Lake Huron objects had all been abandoned.

Documents released in November 2024 revealed that debris from the Lake Huron object had been recovered and that the object was "from a company who sells weather monitoring equipment."

== List of events ==
Detected	Shot down	Location(s)	Incident	Circumstances	Ref.
January 28, 2023	February 4, 2023 (United States) USAF F-22	Alaska, Western Canada, and contiguous U.S.	2023 Chinese balloon incident	A Chinese high-altitude surveillance balloon transited Canadian and U.S. airspace before being shot down off the coast of South Carolina by the U.S. Air Force on February 4.	
February 2, 2023	—	Costa Rica, Colombia, and Venezuela	2023 Latin America balloon incident	A Chinese high-altitude balloon flew over Costa Rica, Colombia, and Venezuela. A spokesperson for the Chinese government confirmed the balloon was theirs and said that it was used for "flight tests" and was blown off-course.	
February 9, 2023	February 10, 2023 (United States) USAF F-22	Alaska (North Slope)	2023 Alaska high-altitude object	A high-altitude object entered U.S. airspace on February 9 and was shot down over the Beaufort Sea by the U.S. Air Force. The Department of Defense said it was the size of a small car and flying northeast at approximately 40,000 feet (12,000 m), posing a risk to civilian flight.	
—	February 11, 2023 (United States) USAF F-22	Yukon	2023 Yukon high-altitude object	Canadian and U.S. authorities ordered the downing of an unidentified object over Yukon, and a U.S. Air Force F-22 (part of the joint U.S.-Canada North American Aerospace Defense Command) shot down the object in Canadian airspace.	
February 11, 2023	February 12, 2023 (United States) MNANG F-16	Alberta, Montana, Wisconsin, Michigan, Ontario, Lake Huron	2023 Lake Huron high-altitude object	An octagonal object with strings hanging from it was detected over northern Montana, Wisconsin, and the Upper Peninsula of Michigan at 20,000 feet (6,100 m). Airspace was temporarily closed in the Lake Huron area, where the object was shot down by the US Air Force and National Guard, falling into Canadian waters.	
February 12, 2023	—	Rizhao	2023 Shandong high-altitude object	Chinese authorities said they detected an unidentified object over the Yellow Sea, in waters near Qingdao, and were planning to shoot it down due to proximity to Jianggezhuang, a major PLA naval base.	
February 14, 2023	—	Southeast Romania, and Moldova	2023 Moldova and Romania high-altitude objects	The Romanian Air Force unsuccessfully attempted to intercept an unidentified object detected roughly 36,000 feet (11,000 m) above Southeast Romania. Neighboring Moldova briefly closed its airspace due to a balloon-like object.	
February 16, 2023	—	Shijiazhuang	2023 Hebei high-altitude object	Shijiazhuang Airport, serving Hebei's provincial capital, was shuttered for two hours due to local airspace "being occupied" by an unidentified flying object. Government sources later stated that the object was a balloon but provided no further follow-up, leading to a drop in domestic Chinese stocks.	
February 19, 2023	—	Pacific Ocean, northeast of Hawaii	2023 Pacific Ocean high-altitude object	American air traffic control from the Oakland Air Route Traffic Control Center reported that a large white balloon had been reported to be flying at an altitude of roughly 40,000 to 50,000 feet (12,000 to 15,000 m) over the Pacific Ocean, about 594 miles (956 km) northeast of Honolulu, United States.	
April–May, 2023	—	Hawaii	2023 Hawaii high-altitude object	The balloon flew over parts of Hawaii and was heading towards Mexico.	

== See also ==
- Airspace class
- Unidentified flying object
- List of reported UFO sightings
- Jetpack man
- Mystery airship
- 2010 California contrail incident
