= 2023 Chinese balloon incident =

Airspace violation and shootdown incident

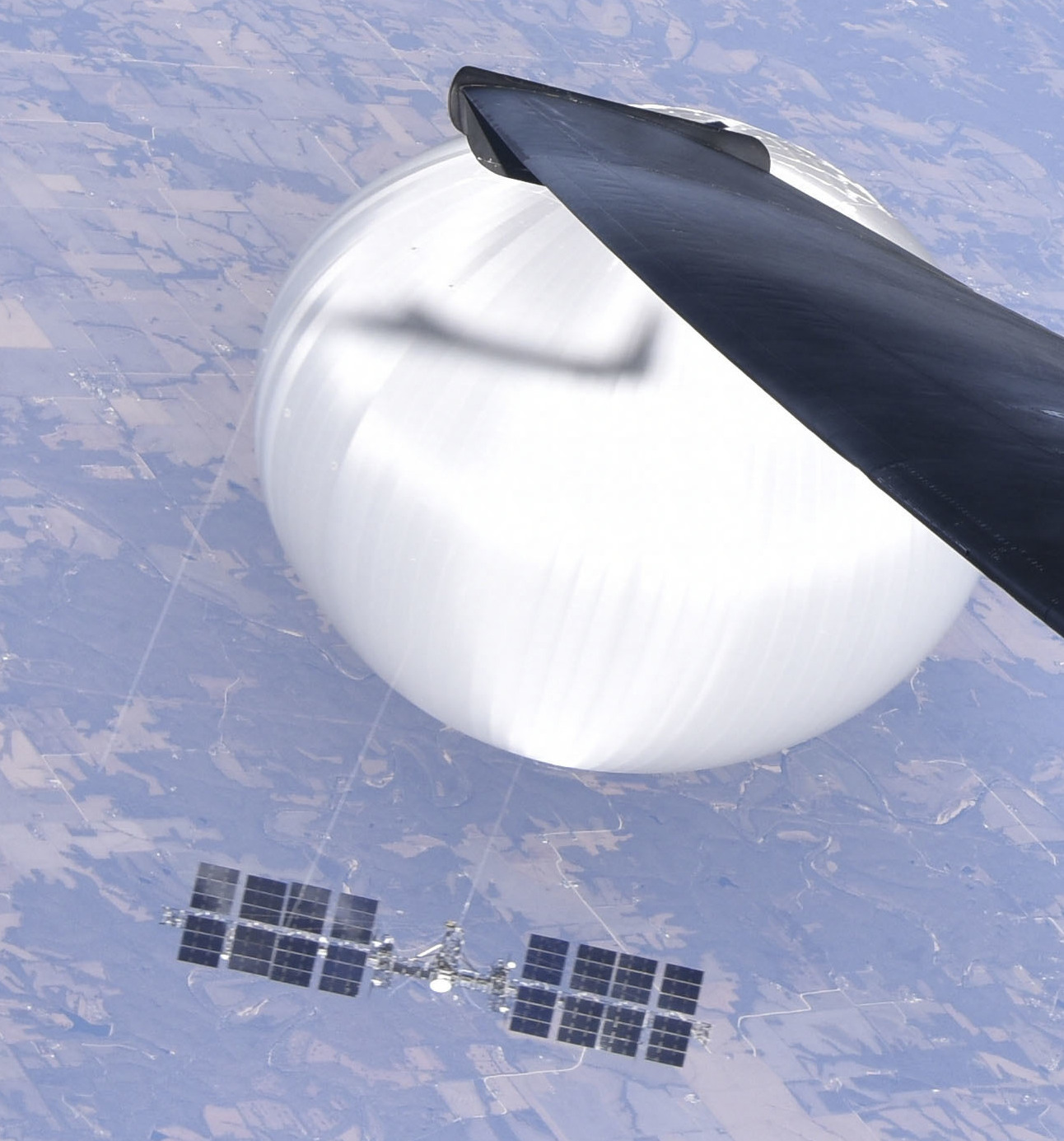
- The balloon photographed over the Central United States from a U.S. Air Force U-2S Dragon Lady on February 3
- Date: January 28 – February 4, 2023
- Location: Airspace over the United States, Canada, and territorial waters, Lake Huron
- Type: Airspace violation; diplomatic incident
- Cause: High-altitude Chinese balloon entering foreign airspace
- Motive: Blown off course into U.S. airspace due to westerlies, or for reconnaissance (allegedly)
- Participants: United States; Joe Biden; Antony Blinken; Lloyd Austin; Mark Milley; Glen VanHerck (NORAD); Canada; Justin Trudeau; Anita Anand; Wayne Eyre; China; Xi Jinping; Wang Yi; Qin Gang
- Outcome: Balloon downed by an AIM-9X Sidewinder fired by a U.S. Air Force F-22A Raptor; debris recovered

From January 28 to February 4, 2023, a high-altitude balloon originating from China drifted across North American airspace, including Alaska, western Canada, and the contiguous United States. On February 4, the U.S. Air Force shot down the balloon over U.S. territorial waters off the coast of South Carolina near the city of Myrtle Beach. Debris from the wreckage was recovered and sent to the FBI Laboratory in Quantico, Virginia, for analysis. U.S. officials stated that the balloon carried intelligence-gathering equipment but does not appear to have sent information back to China. They believed that while the balloon carried a motor, it could not overcome high altitude winds and the Chinese leadership was not aware of the balloon going off course.

When the object was first spotted, the Pentagon characterized it as a surveillance balloon. The Chinese government maintained it was a civilian (mainly meteorological) airship that had been blown off course. According to U.S. officials, the balloon carried antennas and other equipment capable of geolocating communications signals, and similar balloons from China have flown over more than 40 nations. Analysts said that its flight path and structural characteristics were unlike those of a typical weather balloon. American officials later disclosed that they had been tracking the balloon since it was launched from Hainan and its original destinations were likely Guam and Hawaii, (Note: Guam and Hawaii are home to key U.S. military installations.) but prevailing winds blew it off course and across North America.

The incident increased U.S.–China tensions. The United States called the balloon's presence a violation of its sovereignty, and its secretary of state Antony Blinken postponed a long-awaited diplomatic visit to Beijing. Canada summoned the Chinese ambassador in response to the incident.

Forensics of the wreckage have confirmed that the balloon's sensors had never been activated while it was flying over the continental US, and so it did not transmit any intelligence back to China. In December 2023, NBC news reported that according to US intelligence officials, the balloon had made use of a commercially available American internet service provider to communicate, and that it was "primarily for navigation".

Three other high-altitude objects, over Northern Alaska (February 10), Yukon (February 11), and Lake Huron (February 11–12) respectively, were detected and subsequently shot down; a later assessment said they had no relation to China.

== Background ==
=== History and development of reconnaissance balloons ===
Balloons have been valued for their ability to observe the battlefield and direct artillery. Their usage peaked during World War I, after which they were increasingly replaced by airplanes. During the Cold War, the United States sent hundreds of high-altitude balloons, ostensibly for "meteorological survey" under Project Genetrix, over China and other Eastern Bloc countries to gain intelligence on their nuclear capabilities, drawing their protests.

Although mostly supplanted by surveillance satellites and unmanned aerial vehicles, balloons have retained some advantages, such as a lower cost of production and deployment. By 2019, the Pentagon had invested millions in COLD STAR (Covert Long Dwell Stratospheric Architecture), a project for stealthy balloons that are now being transitioned from narcotics surveillance into military service. China recognizes the importance of catching up to foreign countries in this domain. Its military publications have highlighted the use of balloons to assess the early warning and response capabilities of enemy air defenses and to enhance China's own defense capabilities.

==== Past Chinese balloons and unidentified objects ====
Suspected Chinese surveillance balloons have been detected in U.S. airspace in the past, namely over Guam, Hawaii, and Florida. One incursion occurred earlier during Joe Biden's presidency (2021–2025) and three occurred during Donald Trump's first presidency (2017–2021). These incursions did not persist as long as the one in 2023, and China was able to recover those balloons.

Other pre-2023 incursions have remained unexplained and are classified by U.S. authorities as unidentified aerial phenomena. In 2022, the Office of the Director for National Intelligence said that there had been at least 171 reports of unexplained aerial phenomena in the United States, and the intelligence community has been unable to determine their precise nature. The commander of United States Northern Command (USNORTHCOM), General Glen VanHerck, said that U.S. failure to detect and identify all such incursions is "a domain awareness gap that we have to figure out". In response, the U.S. changed the sensitivity of its radar detection systems, which enabled it to detect additional UFOs.

The U.S. Department of State said that many Chinese balloons have flown over more than forty countries and said that they have carried out surveillance linked to the Chinese military. In 2020 and 2021, similar balloons were sighted in Sendai and Hachinohe, Japan, respectively, but they were not identified as of Chinese origin at the time. A similar aircraft was sighted in January 2022 over India's strategically important Andaman and Nicobar Islands. In February 2022, Taiwan's Ministry of National Defense said that several balloons detected off the coast of the country were likely used for meteorological observations for China's Eastern Theater Command. Another crashed near Taiwan in February 2023, carrying an antenna, a transmitter, and temperature and humidity sensors and was likely from China as well.

=== U.S.–China tensions ===
The 2023 balloon incident occurred while U.S.–China relations were at their worst in decades, following suspected incidents of Chinese espionage (Note: The New York Times article cites the Office of Personnel Management data breach, the Anthem medical data breach, and a Marriott International data breach as examples.) and amid increasing strategic competition in military and economic sectors. In 2022, the United States, along with some of its allies, imposed stringent export controls on "foundational technologies", such as semiconductor microprocessors, to China in order to hamper the latter's development of advanced technology and military tools. The US has also sought to maintain critical supply chains independent from China.

== Incident ==
=== Balloon ===
Comparisons of an estimated size of the balloon with silhouettes of an F-22, an AIM-9X Sidewinder missile, a human being, and the Statue of Liberty

==== Size, propulsion, and payload ====
The balloon carried an underslung payload described as a "technology bay" estimated to be the size of "two or three school buses" (Note: Sources citing the defense official who gave the estimate did not identify what size of a bus was referenced. Lengths of U.S. school buses vary but are limited to 45 feet (14 m) per specifications defined by the National Congress on School Transportation.) and was powered by sixteen solar arrays mounted on the payload. The balloon was 200 feet (61 m) tall according to U.S. General Glen D. VanHerck. AI startup Synthetaic, using image data from Planet Labs spacecraft, reported the balloon's diameter as 148 feet (45 m). USNORTHCOM and NORAD Commander, General Glen VanHerck, estimated the payload weighed more than 2,000 pounds (910 kg).

The Chinese balloon was a superpressure balloon similar to earlier NASA designs, where the volume of the balloon is kept relatively constant in the face of changes in ambient pressure outside the balloon, and the temperature of the contained lifting gas. This allows better altitude control and much longer endurance compared to the more common variable-volume balloon design.

National Security Council spokesman Admiral John Kirby said the craft had a propeller and could be maneuvered. U.S. officials told foreign diplomats in Beijing that the craft had rudders and propellers. A Chinese Foreign Ministry spokesperson said it had "limited self-steering capability".

The U.S. Department of Defense said the balloon did not present a military or physical threat to people on the ground while it remained in the air, and that shooting it down over water would be safer and increased the opportunity to study the wreckage for intelligence purposes.

Citing a PLA procurement portal, a U.S. official said that the balloon was manufactured by a civilian Chinese defense contractor.

Further analysis revealed a number of foreign origin parts including an Iridium Communications 9602 satellite communication unit and parts from Texas Instruments, Omega Engineering, Amphenol, onsemi, and STMicroelectronics.

==== Signals intelligence capabilities ====
Experts noted that weather balloons typically are about 20 feet (6 m) wide, less than a quarter of the balloon's diameter. Those interviewed by BBC News said it was unusual for weather balloons to last as long as the one involved in the incident and that the balloon "might have been more sophisticated than China claims".

Images from U-2 flybys and forensic analysis of the payload showed antennas that likely were used for collecting and transmitting signals intelligence. A publicly released U.S. State Department document, after the balloon was downed and debris collected, said that the balloon's solar arrays produced sufficient power to operate "multiple active intelligence collection sensors" and that the antennas on the balloon could collect and geolocate communications, including radio and mobile phone signals, but it was unknown if any specific devices were targets. Former U.S. Air Force Lt. General Charles "Tuna" Moore said that the surveillance technology aboard was inconsistent with meteorological missions and hypothesized that the Chinese would be interested in finding vulnerabilities and "building a picture of our radar, weapon system and communication capabilities".

U.S. authorities did not name the manufacturer of the balloon but said with high confidence that the entity has "direct commercial ties" to the People's Liberation Army. They cited this as an example of military-civil fusion, where China encourages competition from and technology exchange with its private sector.

=== Detection ===
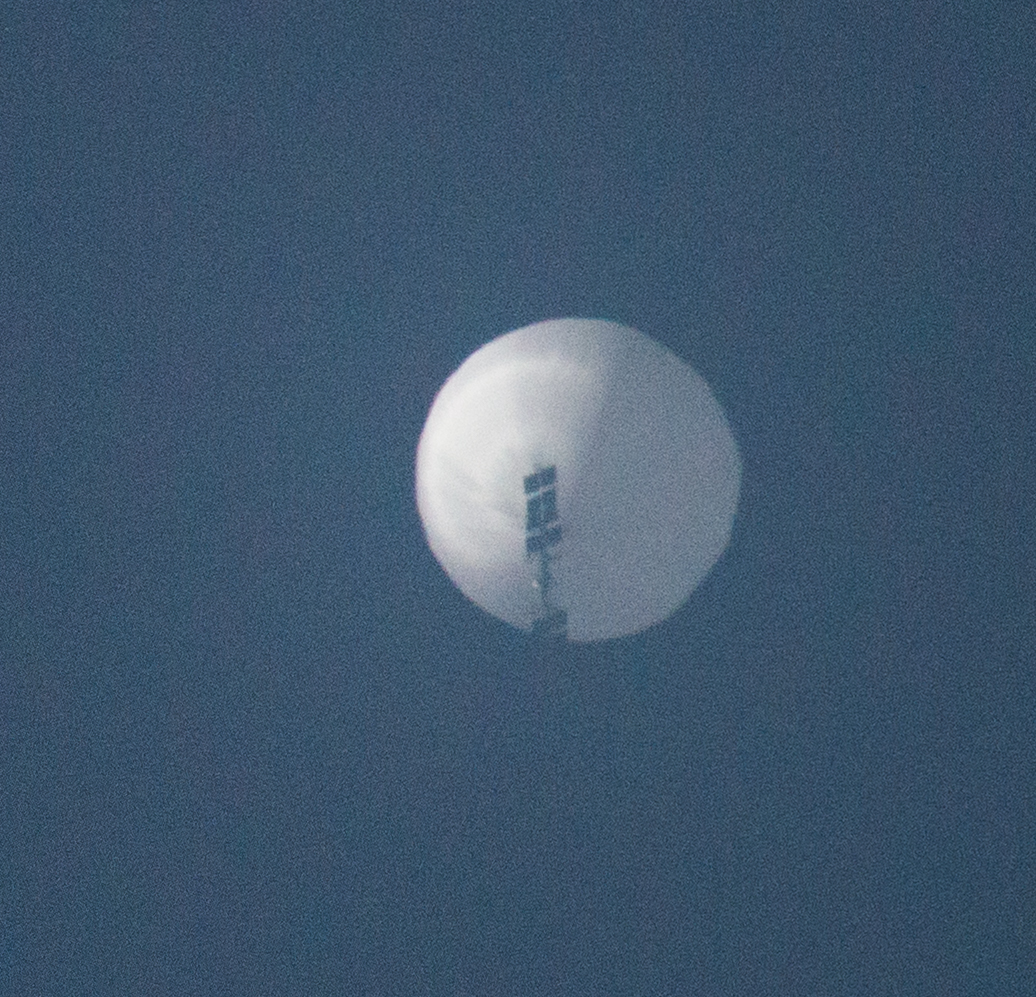
The balloon photographed over Billings, Montana, on February 1

Defense Department Briefing, February 3, 2023

High-altitude balloons are extremely difficult to detect. A 2005 study by the U.S. Air Force's Air University states surveillance balloons often present very small radar cross-sections, "on the order of hundredths of a square meter, about the same as a small bird", and essentially no infrared signature, which complicates the use of anti-aircraft weapons. A 2009 research paper by a USAF officer stated that balloons "are inherently stealthy" due to a tiny infrared signature at high altitude (as the balloon possesses no engines) and because of the difficulty of radar detection (as the balloons lack sharp edges and metal structures).

The balloon's first reported sighting was on February 1, 2023, when civilians on a commercial airliner spotted it. On the same day, former Billings Gazette editor Chase Doak spotted the object above Billings, Montana, after seeing reports that the airspace around Billings was closed. He had initially assumed it was a star or a UFO. Doak contacted his friend and Billings Gazette photographer Larry Mayer, and the two photographed the balloon using telephoto lenses. Mayer also sent the images to various government agencies. After the photographs were published in the Billings Gazette and received widespread media coverage, the U.S. Department of Defense and the Canadian Department of National Defence announced on February 2 that NORAD was aware of a high-altitude surveillance balloon believed to belong to China and had been tracking it for "several" days. The balloon was flying at an altitude of 60,000 feet (18,000 m) over Billings at the time.

American defense officials considered shooting the balloon down but initially decided not to due to the risk of debris injuring civilians on the ground. A meeting was convened between Secretary of Defense Austin, Chairman of the Joint Chiefs of Staff General Mark Milley, NORTHCOM/NORAD Commander General VanHerck, and other military commanders. Biden was advised by officials not to shoot it down because debris could threaten civilians or cause property damage.

=== Flight path ===
Approximate route of the balloon

According to U.S. intelligence and retrospective analysis of satellite images, the balloon was tracked near Hainan island of China as early as January 15. (Note: Reports of its detection near Hainan came out after the balloon was shot down.) It was able to change its altitude before entering the Pacific Ocean, where officials believe it was blown off-course. Retired NASA engineer Rodger Farley told the New York Times that winter winds may vary too little in direction to allow for course corrections.

The balloon entered U.S. airspace above the Aleutian Islands on January 28, 2023, then moved across Alaska, and entered Canadian airspace over the Yukon and Northwest Territories on January 30, 2023. After flying southeast over British Columbia, the balloon re-entered the U.S. in northern Idaho on January 31 and Montana on February 1, where it was spotted over Billings. Montana is the location of multiple intercontinental ballistic missile installations, such as Malmstrom Air Force Base, causing suspicion that the balloon had been launched to surveil said nuclear installations. The U.S. ground-based intercontinental nuclear arsenal is composed of about 400 LGM-30 Minuteman III missiles deployed around Malmstrom AFB in Montana, Minot AFB in North Dakota, and Francis E. Warren AFB in Wyoming. Meteorologist Dan Satterfield calculated a possible trajectory along this path using the HYSPLIT atmospheric model, consistent with data on prevailing westerlies from China to Montana. The balloon was spotted above northwest Missouri, near Kansas City, on February 3, and subsequently passed near Whiteman Air Force Base, which houses nuclear-capable Northrop Grumman B-2 Spirits.

According to some U.S. officials, China attempted to speed up the balloon, after its presence became known to the public, in order for it to exit U.S. airspace more quickly. Other officials reported that the balloon loitered near sensitive military sites and made multiple passes under control. Experts interviewed by Time said that the balloon traveled much farther than a typical weather balloon would and Chinese officials should not be surprised that it would eventually reach the contiguous United States or be detected. The balloon flew at an altitude of 60,000 feet (18,000 m). In comparison, business jets can reach 51,000 feet (16,000 m), commercial airliners can reach 45,000 feet (14,000 m), and the SR-71 (a now-retired American surveillance plane) has reached 90,000 feet (27,000 m).

=== U.S. monitoring and counterintelligence ===
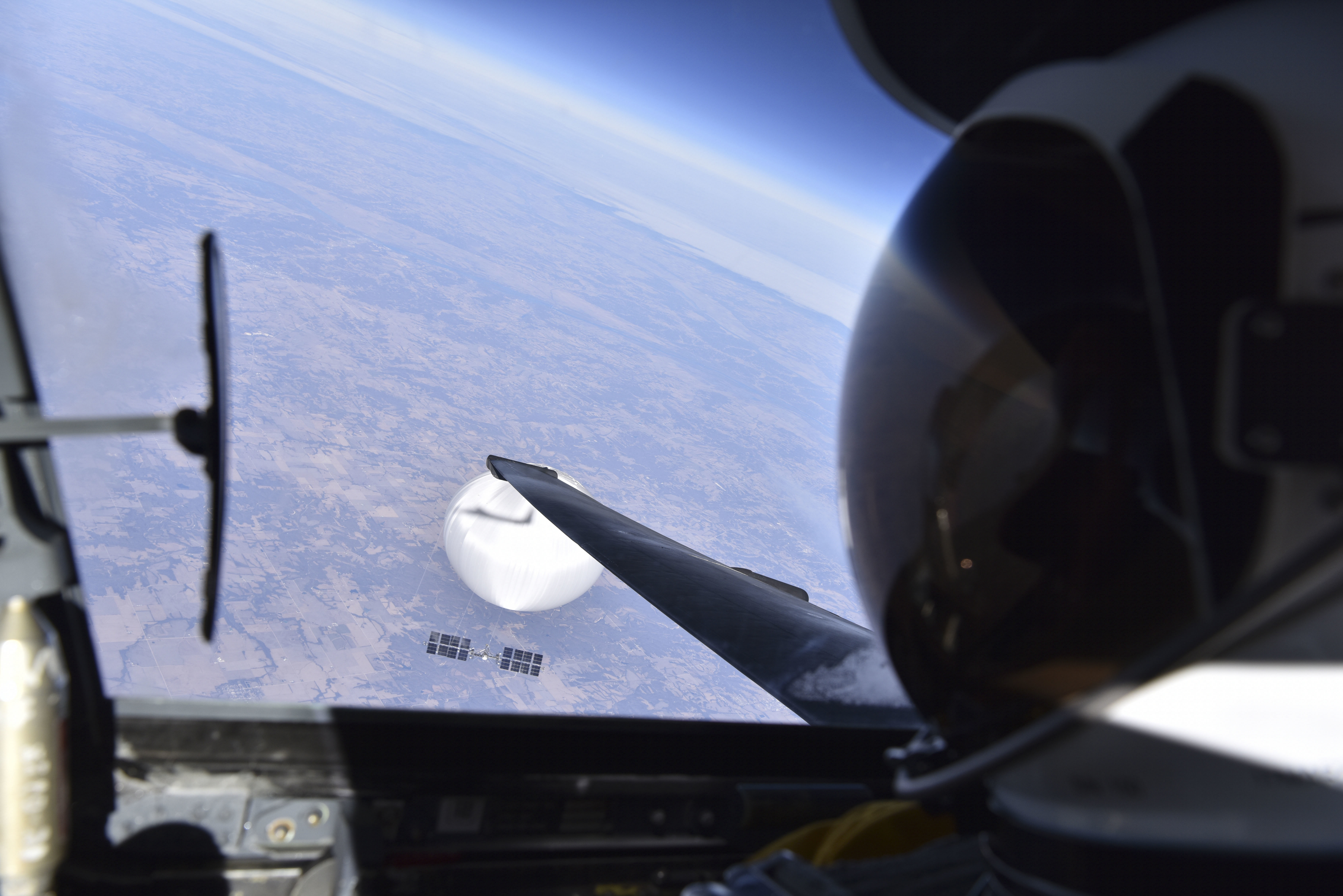
A U.S. Air Force U-2 pilot takes a picture somewhere over the Central Continental U.S.; the balloon is in the background

During the incident, a U.S. defense official stated that the balloon had "limited additive value from an intelligence collection perspective". Nonetheless, the Pentagon took steps to protect its assets from leaking sensitive information to the balloon. U.S. Secretary of Defense Lloyd Austin said the U.S. military was able to collect valuable intelligence on the balloon while it was transiting North America. Air Force General Glen VanHerck said that the U.S. Department of Defense obtained special authorization to collect intelligence against the balloon within the U.S. U.S. officials also told American civilians not to try to shoot the balloon down, citing that it was too high to be reached by conventional firearms.

Two F-22 Raptors were scrambled from Nellis Air Force Base after the balloon was spotted on February 1. It was also monitored by crewed aircraft deployed by NORAD, including a Boeing E-3 Sentry Airborne Early Warning and Control System (AWACS), a Boeing RC-135 reconnaissance aircraft, a U-2S Dragon Lady, and another F-22 Raptor from Langley Air Force Base. The U.S. Department of Defense said that, during the balloon's overflight of the United States, it had blocked the balloon from gathering intelligence and was able to study the balloon and its equipment. Officials told CNN that the U.S. was able to track and monitor the balloon by its signals, but it seemed to stop transmitting after the U.S. learned about its presence.

A U.S. government official said that at least two U-2S reconnaissance aircraft were used to gather data about the balloon while it was over the Midwest, though it was not clear at which points in the balloon's flight it was tracked by U-2S aircraft. The War Zone commented that the U-2S's high flight ceiling, exceeding 70,000 feet (21,000 m), allowed it to observe the balloon from within relatively close proximity (including from above), and its electronic warfare suite allowed the aircraft to potentially jam or monitor any radio emissions from the balloon, such as data transmissions directed upwards towards Chinese communications satellites.

In early April, unnamed U.S. officials told NBC that the balloon was able to gather electronic intelligence from the military sites it overflew and transmit it back to China. The U.S. Department of Defense could not confirm the report and reiterated that any information gathered would have "limited additive value".

=== Downing ===
Video of the balloon falling after being shot

On February 4, the balloon had drifted over the Carolinas. The Federal Aviation Administration closed airspace over the area in one of the largest temporary flight restrictions in U.S. history, "more than five times the restricted airspace surrounding Washington, D.C., and nearly double the area of the state of Massachusetts". A ground stop was ordered on the coast at Myrtle Beach International Airport and Charleston International Airport in South Carolina, and Wilmington International Airport in North Carolina. Military aircraft were reported to be over the Carolinas. U.S. officials later stated that this was in preparation for the eventual downing of the balloon within American territorial waters over the Atlantic Ocean.

The balloon was shot down over U.S. territorial waters off the coast of Myrtle Beach, South Carolina, by an AIM-9X Sidewinder missile fired from a U.S. Air Force F-22 Raptor that had departed from Langley Air Force Base; the downing occurred at 2:39 p.m. eastern time. The F-22 fired the missile at an altitude of 58,000 feet (18,000 m), which struck the balloon at an altitude of 60,000–65,000 feet (18–20 km). The balloon splashed down within U.S. territorial waters 6 nautical miles (11 km) off the coastline, where the water was 47 feet (14 m) deep. The downing was the first recorded by an F-22 aircraft, the first of an aircraft over U.S. territory since World War II, and is speculated to be the highest altitude air-to-air kill in recorded history.

=== Debris recovery ===
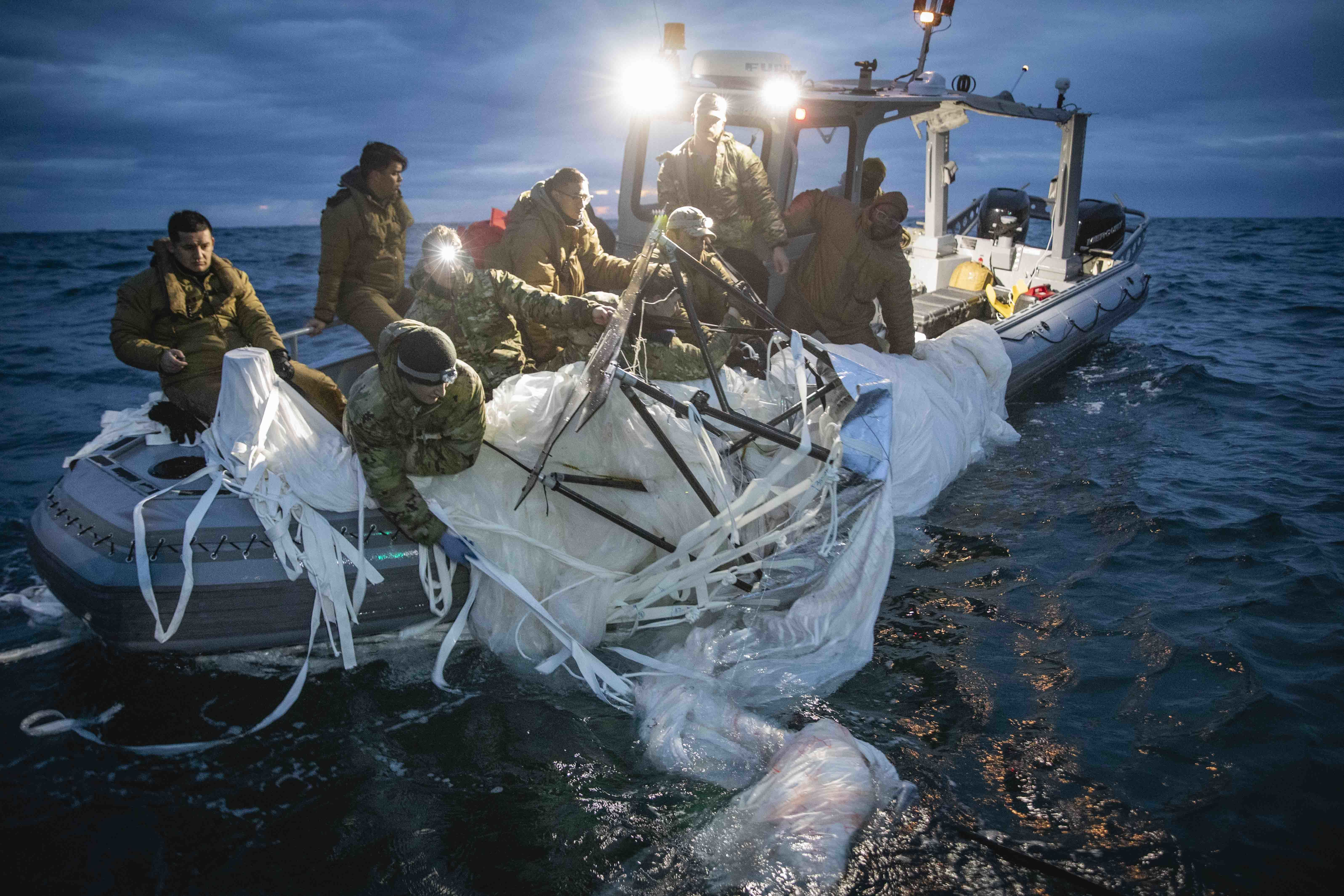
Sailors assigned to Explosive Ordnance Disposal Group 2 recover a portion of the balloon from the Atlantic.

Debris from the balloon was dispersed over an area of 2.25 square kilometres (0.87 sq mi), where the ocean was about 47 feet (14 m) deep. A pair of F-15Cs from Barnes Air National Guard Base used Sniper targeting pods to record the downing and locations of falling debris. VanHerck said the United States Navy was conducting recovery operations while the U.S. Coast Guard was securing the region where the debris fell. Guided-missile destroyer USS Oscar Austin, guided-missile cruiser USS Philippine Sea, and dock landing ship USS Carter Hall were tasked with retrieving the balloon wreckage, alongside Coast Guard cutters and helicopters, U.S. Navy divers, and FBI counterintelligence agents. General VanHerck stated that unmanned underwater vehicles controlled from rigid inflatable boats used side-scan sonar to locate the sunken debris. The unmanned submersibles analyzed the wreckage to identify potential threats to recovery divers, such as explosives or batteries with hazardous materials.

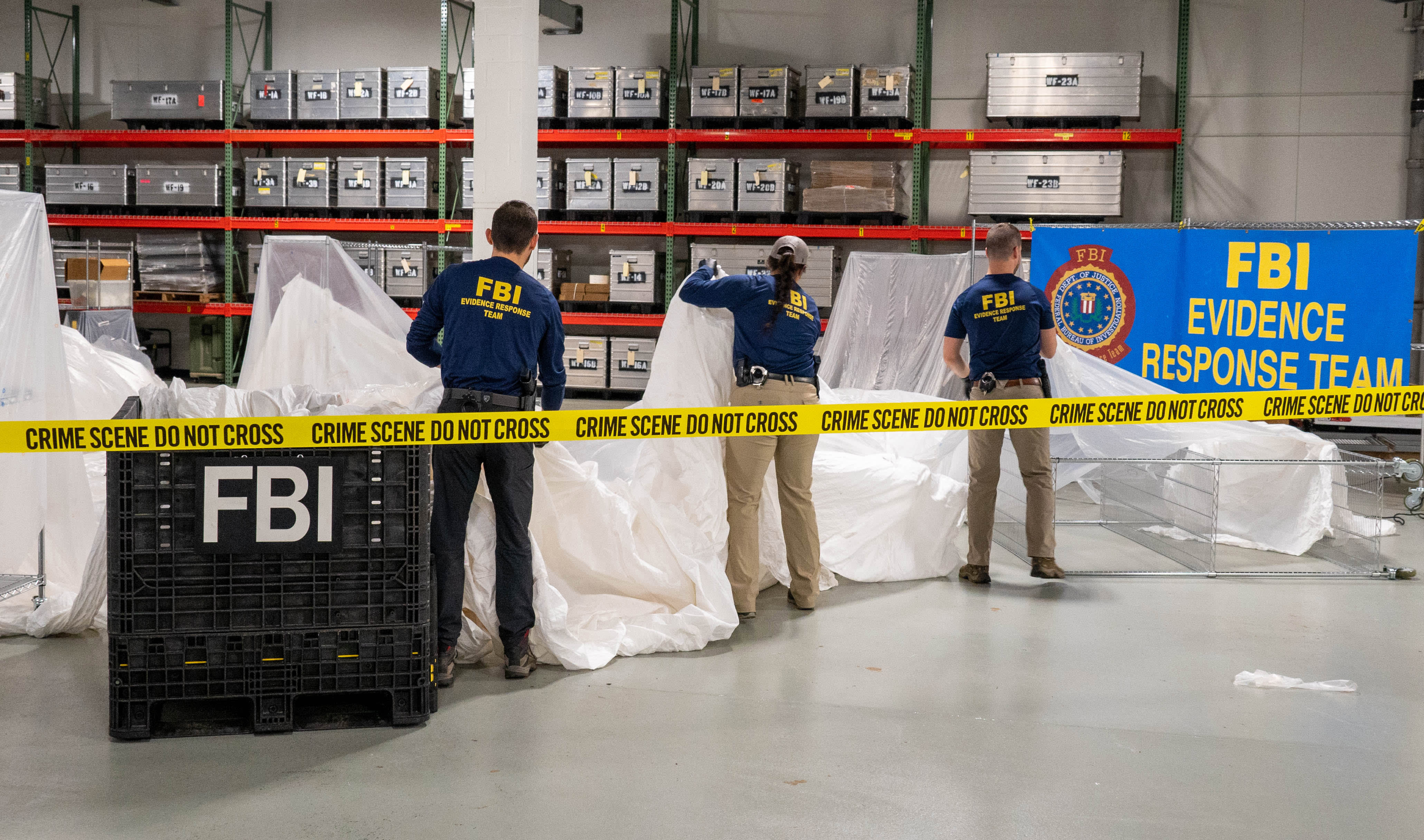
FBI Special Agents assigned to the Evidence Response Team process material recovered from the balloon.

On February 6, some of the downed payload was sent to the FBI Laboratory in Quantico, Virginia, for forensic analysis by the Bureau's Operational Technology Division. Possible balloon debris was spotted later on the South Carolina coast, where police were asking residents to report other sightings. China said it wanted the wreckage returned, but the U.S. said it had no plans to do so.

By February 13, the U.S. had recovered a significant portion of the balloon's payload, including sensors, electronics, and structural sections. The entire payload measured 30 feet (9.1 m), weighed more than 2,000 pounds (910 kg) by estimates, and contained all of the craft's equipment and antennas. Underwater recovery efforts were suspended on February 14 due to bad weather. On February 17, the U.S. military said that recovery operations have concluded for the balloon after the final debris was located and retrieved.

== Legality of airspace and downing ==
The United States asserts sovereignty of the airspace above its territories. Like that of other countries, this right is recognized by the Chicago Convention on International Civil Aviation. Foreign aircraft are generally permitted to transit through U.S. airspace but must follow specific procedures and regulations. Article 8 of the convention states that aircraft flown without pilots must obtain permission from the country below and must be controlled to reduce danger.

Before the revelation by the United States that the balloon was likely blown off course, analysts concluded that shooting it down was legal under U.S. domestic law. Its destruction under international law is murkier due to potential intervening factors such as force majeure, but characterizing it as an act of reprisal would help firm up that position. Although China protested the shootdown, legal scholar Julian Ku said that the wording of China's statement reflects that its Ministry of Foreign Affairs "does not believe downing the balloon is a clear legal violation."

== Response and reactions ==
=== United States ===
Secretary of State Blinken postponed a scheduled diplomatic trip to China in response, which would have been the first such visit since 2018. The White House did not want to announce the balloon's incursion to protect Blinken's visit, but press and social media interest made Pentagon officials comment.

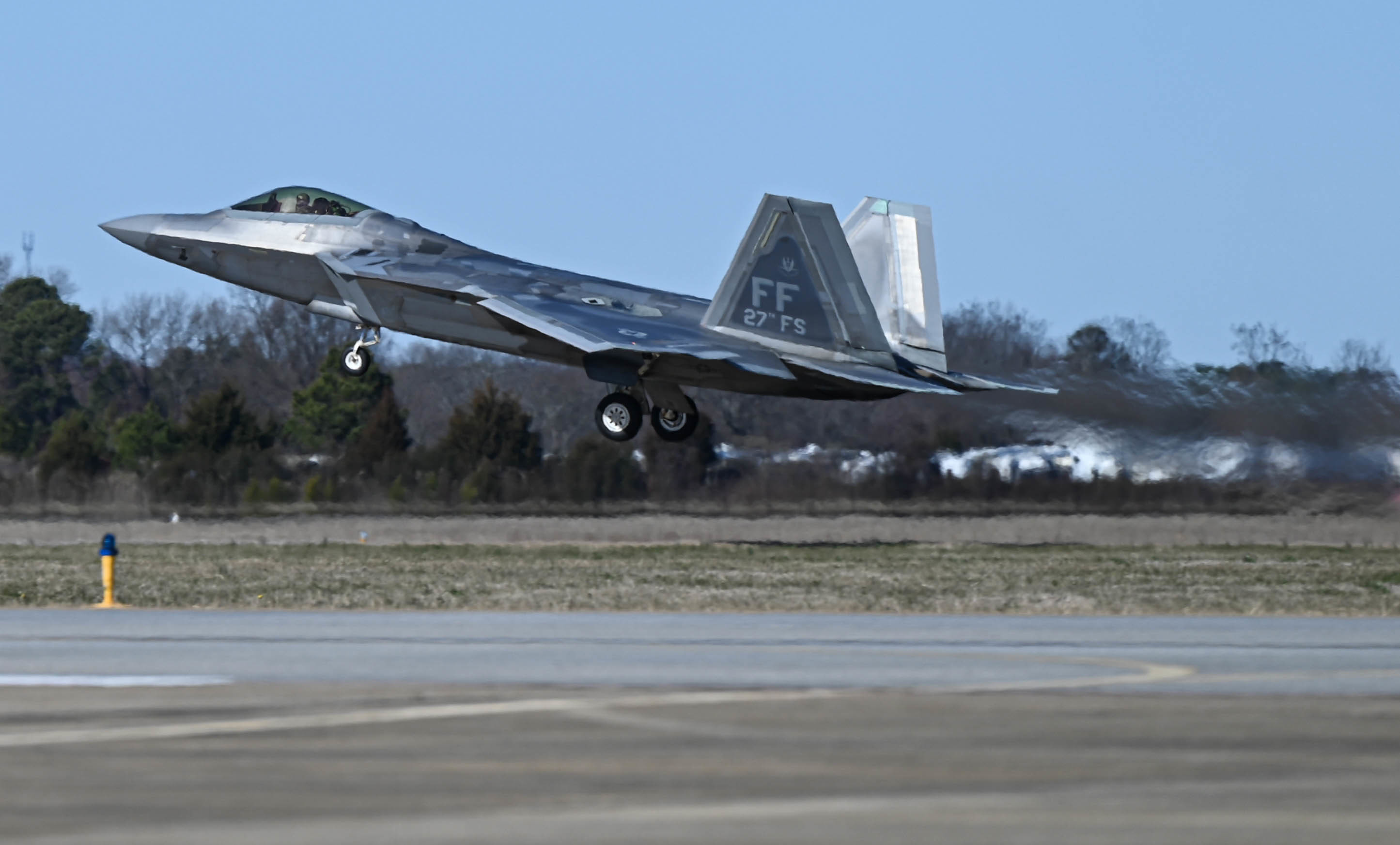
F-22 Raptor takes off from Joint Base Langley-Eustis during the balloon incident.

In response to questions regarding the situation, on February 4, Biden said, "We're going to take care of it". Later that day, U.S. officials disclosed that three days earlier he had granted permission to down the balloon.

Pentagon officials stated that there was no earlier opportunity to shoot down over water, rebutting Trump and other Republicans who criticized the Biden administration for not shooting down the balloon earlier. Senate Democratic Leader Chuck Schumer added: "The bottom line here is that shooting down the balloon over water wasn't just the safest option, but it was the one that maximized our intel gain."

External map
- Chinese balloon base in Hainan

On February 6, U.S. Deputy Secretary of State Wendy Sherman briefed 150 diplomats from about 40 embassies on China's balloon surveillance program, said by U.S. officials to have been operated for several years by the People's Liberation Army from Hainan on China's south coast, as part of an effort to "name and shame" Chinese espionage by publicizing it. Officials are communicating separately with countries where they say there have been at least two dozen such overflights since 2018, including Japan, India, Vietnam, Taiwan and the Philippines in addition to North and South America.

The U.S. House Armed Services Committee held a February 7 hearing on wide-ranging Chinese military and intelligence threats including the balloon incursions. Committee chair Republican Mike Rogers characterized the balloon as an intentionally calculated show of force. A U.S. official told The Washington Post there was no sense that the balloon was a deliberate provocation, as it was part of an ongoing global surveillance program. The U.S. House of Representatives voted 419–0 to adopt a resolution condemning China for the incident.

Trump called reports of intrusions during his administration "fake disinformation"; and his ex-top national security officials said they were unaware of any balloon incursions during their tenure. Biden administration National Security Advisor Jake Sullivan said that improved airspace surveillance ordered by Biden after he took office had detected the previous incursions and "enhanced our capacity to be able to detect things that the Trump administration was unable to detect".

On February 9, Biden stated that the suspected Chinese spy balloon was "not a major breach", and claimed that the incident was unintentional and that it was embarrassing the Chinese authorities.

"It's not a major breach. Look, the total amount of intelligence gathering that's going on by every country around the world is overwhelming. China has some legitimate difficulties unrelated to the United States. And I think one of the things that balloon caused was not so much that it got shot down, but I don't think the leadership knew where it was, what was in it, and what was going on."-US President Joe Biden

On February 10, the U.S. accused six Chinese companies of supporting the country's military and balloon surveillance program and added them to the U.S. Commerce Department Bureau of Industry and Security's Entity List, which places certain restrictions on exports: Beijing Nanjiang Aerospace Technology Co., Ltd.; China Electronics Technology Group Corporation (CETC) 48th Research Institute; Dongguan Lingkong Remote Sensing Technology Co., Ltd.; Eagles Men Aviation Science and Technology Group Co., Ltd. (EMAST); Guangzhou Tian-Hai-Xiang Aviation Technology Co., Ltd.; and Shanxi Eagles Men Aviation Science and Technology Group Co., Ltd. Washington did not specifically link any of them to the balloon that it had shot down.

On February 14, intelligence officials began to explore the possibility that the balloon had not been intended to penetrate U.S. airspace and transit the continental United States but that Chinese authorities had instead sought to engage in more typical surveillance activities near Guam before the balloon potentially became blown off course. These discussions suggested that the international incident caused by the balloon's cross-continental transit may have been partly the result of an accident.

On February 16, President Biden gave his first formal remarks on the incident saying, "We're not looking for a new Cold War, but I make no apologies, we will compete and we will responsibly manage that competition so that it doesn't veer into conflict." He further directed his team to develop "sharper rules on how to address these unidentified objects in the future so that the government can distinguish between those that are likely to pose safety and security risks that necessitate action and those that do not."

In March, senators Mark Kelly and Ted Budd introduced legislation to mandate tracking of high-altitude balloons.

At a June fundraising event, Biden compared his Chinese counterpart to a dictator and said that Xi was upset about not knowing the location of the balloon, which carried "two box cars" of spy equipment.

This incident increased attention on the controversy surrounding Chinese purchases of farmland in the US.

In May 2024, the U.S. Commerce Department added 37 additional units of CETC to the Entity List.

=== Canada ===
Canadian officials and Global Affairs Canada summoned the Chinese Ambassador to Canada, Cong Peiwu, to Ottawa while the Department of National Defence announced it was monitoring the situation alongside the United States through NORAD. A statement from the Canadian Armed Forces said there was no threat to Canadians, and Minister of Foreign Affairs Mélanie Joly would remain in contact with Blinken.

=== China ===
On February 3, spokesperson of the Chinese Ministry of Foreign Affairs Mao Ning said: "It is a civilian airship used for research, mainly meteorological, purposes. Affected by the Westerlies and with limited self-steering capability, the airship deviated far from its planned course." She said China regretted the unintentional incident, citing force majeure. On February 6, Mao said that the U.S. "hyped up the incident on purpose and even used force to attack", and called the shoot down "an unacceptable and irresponsible action".

After the downing on February 5, Vice Foreign Minister Xie Feng said he had filed a formal complaint with the U.S. Embassy in response to the incident. Xie accused the United States of indiscriminately using force against a civilian airship that was about to leave U.S. airspace. This force was in violation of "the spirit of international law and international practice" and said that the Chinese government reserved the right to "take further necessary responses". On February 6, a Chinese diplomat said in an interview with French news network LCI that the United States should return the recovered balloon debris to China.

On February 13, Chinese Foreign Affairs spokesperson Wang Wenbin said that U.S. high-altitude balloons had "illegally crossed China's airspace" more than ten times since 2022. According to CNN, he did not offer evidence. Wang also complained about U.S. reconnaissance against China and wiretapping efforts around the world. U.S. National Security spokesperson John Kirby said "there is no U.S. surveillance craft in China's airspace" but declined to specify whether his denial covered disputed airspace claimed by China. On February 14, Wang elaborated by saying that since 2022, circumnavigation balloons launched from U.S. soil flew over China and other countries illegally more than ten times.

On February 14, Minister of Foreign Affairs spokeswoman Hua Chunying suggested the U.S. was focused more on the "wandering civilian balloon" than the 2023 Ohio train derailment.

=== NATO ===
NATO secretary-general Jens Stoltenberg said the balloon "confirms a pattern of Chinese behavior where we see that China has invested heavily in new capabilities, including different types of surveillance and intelligence platforms", and that it presents security challenges for the members of the alliance.

=== Australia ===
Amidst the ongoing Australia–China trade war, Australian Minister for Foreign Affairs Penny Wong said: "I believe the US has managed this as carefully as possible. They brought the balloon down over their own territorial waters."

=== Japan ===
Japan said that it strongly suspected Chinese surveillance balloons had entered its territory on at least three occasions and told China that violations of its airspace by uncrewed surveillance balloons were absolutely unacceptable.

=== Singapore ===
The Singaporean Minister for Foreign Affairs, Vivian Balakrishnan, said that it was a "pity" that Blinken's visit to China was postponed. He added regarding the balloon that "hopefully both sides exercise sufficient self-restraint and reduce the prospects of such incidents".

=== United Kingdom ===
Prime Minister Rishi Sunak stated on February 13 that the United Kingdom's government would do "whatever it takes" to defend the country from observation balloons. He added that the Royal Air Force had alerted Typhoon jets to stand-by. Furthermore, ex-MI6 chief Sir Alex Younger, said that due to the systematic nature of China's surveillance program, the UK must "wake up" to China's threat to global security.

=== Venezuela ===
Venezuela's foreign ministry condemned the United States for shooting down what they stated was an unmanned civilian aircraft which posed no threat.

=== Media reactions ===
==== Analysis ====
Michael Clarke, a British defense analyst, claimed that China wanted the balloon "to be noticed". He described the incident as a "stunt gone wrong", giving the United States an opportunity to "milk this". Believing China to be "completely in the wrong", Clarke surmised that the fly-over was their way of retaliating for a February 2 agreement between the United States and the Philippines that would grant four more US military bases there in response to China's nine dash line claims.

John Blaxland, a professor of international security and intelligence studies at the Australian National University, suggested that China likely expected the balloon to be detected and being detected was the goal. He believes that the balloon was launched to embarrass the US, with intelligence gathering being a secondary objective. Baxland also said that the balloon could be designed to test the resolve of Washington as well as gather information about American detection capabilities and reaction.

On the shooting of the balloon, Christopher Twomey, a security scholar, said that any Chinese response would be restrained and that China would want to "sweep this under the rug" and emphasize senior-level visits within months.

Bonnie Glaser, a China expert at the German Marshall Fund of the United States, said that "we collect intelligence on China from bases all around their east coast, in Japan, Guam and Australia. We fly P-8 [spy plane] flights on a daily basis and the Chinese can't do that." Surveillance ballons might have been a creative way to collect information and to offer China some insights into US capabilities and possibly vulnerabilities.

Gregory Falco, an aerospace security expert at the Johns Hopkins University, said that the balloon's large solar panels and antenna indicated surveillance technology. According to Falco, the first balloon and subsequent UFOs downed by the United States are part of a hybrid communications architecture linking with Chinese satellites. He said that surveillance by balloon is conducted by many nations and detected "all the time" without eliciting a big response. After the balloon was seen by the public, in part because of its large size, political pressure prompted the Biden administration to make a show of force, even though trying to lower the objects' altitude more slowly might have preserved more of their payload compared with destroying them using advanced missiles.

==== Satire ====
The incident was satirized for the show Saturday Night Live the evening after it was shot down. In the sketch, performer Bowen Yang portrayed an anthropomorphized depiction of the downed balloon being interviewed by MSNBC journalist Katy Tur (played by Chloe Fineman). Some sources paid particular attention to Yang's line, "Congrats! You shot a balloon!", with USA Today using it in the headline of its coverage.

== Other high-altitude objects in February 2023 ==
Another balloon was detected flying over Latin America. The Costa Rican General Directorate of Civil Aviation confirmed the incursion by an object "not of Costa Rican origin", which the locals had first seen on February 2. The Colombian Air Force said that on the morning of February 3, it had detected an object with "characteristics similar to those of a balloon" at a height of 55,000 feet (17,000 m) and traveling at a speed of 25 knots (46 kilometres per hour; 29 miles per hour), and after determining it was not a threat to national security and defense or to air safety, had continued to track it until it left Colombian airspace. Sightings of the balloon were also reported from Venezuela, specifically from Maracaibo. The U.S. Department of Defense confirmed those sightings and called the object another Chinese surveillance balloon. On February 6, Mao Ning, the spokeswoman for the Chinese government, confirmed the balloon belongs to China, but said that it was used for "flight tests" and was blown off-course in much the same manner as the one spotted over North America. VanHerck revealed on March 7 that China later took down the second balloon.

On February 10, another high-altitude object was shot down on the vicinity of Deadhorse, Alaska, over the Beaufort Sea; recovery efforts by the Alaska National Guard on the sea ice followed.

On February 11, on previous orders of Canadian Prime Minister Justin Trudeau, a "small, cylindrical object" was shot down over the Yukon Territory for violating Canadian air space; both U.S. and Canadian aircraft had scrambled, and a U.S. F-22 jet fighter made the kill.

On February 12, the US military shot down a fourth unidentified object over Lake Huron, within the maritime territory of Michigan.

On February 14, the US government announced that the latter three high-altitude objects shot down over the North America were likely private entities with no relations to China. Further analysis and debris collections were underway. The four AIM-9X missiles expended for shooting down the three objects cost at least $1.5 million.

On February 17, the US and Canada suspended their search for the debris from the downed objects and the missile that missed.

Documents released in November 2024 revealed that debris from the Lake Huron object had been recovered and that the object was "from a company who sells weather monitoring equipment."

== Additional assessments of the balloon ==
Following the April 2023 Pentagon document leaks, The Washington Post uncovered additional information from a trove of classified files on Discord that had previously not been reported. They include U.S. assessment of the Chinese balloon's power generation capability (up to 10,000 watts), which would be sufficient to operate synthetic-aperture radar equipment if carried on board, and how parts of the Chinese government were surprised by the balloon's North American incursion, judging from intercepted communications. U.S. intelligence had been aware of four other similar balloons, one of which had flown over a Nimitz carrier strike group in western Pacific, while another had crashed in the South China Sea. The documents did not date those incidents. The Pentagon and the Office of National Intelligence declined to comment.

In June, preliminary investigation by the U.S. reported the presence of reconnaissance equipment on board the balloon downed in February. There were conflicting reports on whether it had collected any intelligence during its flight. It does not appear to have sent anything back to China. The Wall Street Journal said the balloon carried off-the-shelf U.S. gear. Pentagon spokesperson Brigadier General Patrick S. Ryder did not confirm that information but said that Chinese drones in the past have utilized off-the-shelf U.S. equipment. He also said that mitigation efforts "contributed" to the balloon not collecting any intelligence while transiting or overflying the United States.

On September 17, 2023, in an interview with CBS news, General Mark Milley, the retiring 20th US chairman of the Joint Chiefs of Staff, stated "I would say it was a spy balloon that we know with high degree of certainty got no intelligence, and didn't transmit any intelligence back to China." Technical experts had also found that the balloon's sensors had never been activated while it was travelling over the Continental United States. Milley also addressed a leading theory that the balloon was originally heading towards Hawaii but had been blow off track by winds at 60,000 feet. Milley said, "those winds are very high...the particular motor on that aircraft can't go against those winds at that altitude."

According to US intelligence officials as reported by NBC News on December 28, 2023, the balloon utilized a commercially available internet service provider based in the US primarily for navigation guidance. The identity of the US company was withheld by NBC for security concerns. Technology from at least five American firms was found in the balloon.

== See also ==
- 1960 U-2 incident
- Balloon busters
- Battle of Los Angeles
- Cold War II
- Fu-Go balloon bomb
- Hainan Island incident
- 2024 New Jersey drone sightings
