= Strategic competition =

Competitive relationship

Strategic competition is a commitment within an organization or polity to make a very large change in competitive relationships. One of the main principles of strategic competition is that the response of an organization regarding another one's introduction of a new product defines the impact of such in the market. This type of competition has proven itself useful when trying to explain a firm's executive compensation schemes, leading to time compensation.

Within a market where strategic competition is present, investment provides a much bigger capability of taking advantage of future opportunities of growth which also implies obtaining a greater market share. If such interaction between rivals is efficiently used, even all actors of the industry in which strategic competition was applied may be compensated on their profits. This is implemented either by putting entry barriers to new competitors or to dissuading others from 'making space' for stronger ones.

Also, the application of strategic competition may lead to outsourcing activities used by rival firms involved in the process.

== Basic elements ==
Strategic competition consists of five basic elements:

- To comprehend competitive interaction as a dynamic system.
- To use such comprehension in order to forecast the effects that any intervention can produce in that system.
- To dispose of many uncommitted resources that can be applied to different purposes.
- To predict the risk and return with enough accuracy for justifying the use of these resources.
- To possess the necessary will to set the actions that must be fulfilled towards such commitment.

In order for strategic competition to be successful, the analysis of these elements require a constant update of the firm's environment, considering that this type of competition possesses a rapidly evolving nature. Despite this, the shift from natural to strategic competition is a long process that might require generations to be fully implemented by a certain market.

== Models ==
According to economics professor Timothy Van Zandt, there exist two models of strategic competition: competition in quantities between firms producing perfect substitutes and competition between firms producing substitute goods by price.

== Other uses ==
The term "strategic competition" is applied outside a business context in fields such as political science and international relations. Geopolitics and military and many other areas that involve many actors that struggle for leadership or power, may use this approach.

This happens because such kind of competition brings about distinctive outcomes linked to capital structure. For example, the current status of Syria have provided a fertile terrain for strategic competition of the many actors involved in the conflict. This element is likely to persist well beyond any formal resolution of the current situation there.

The term has been used by the United Kingdom government, and it is often used by the United States government to describe the economic and geopolitical competition between the U.S. and the People's Republic of China.

In 2021, the U.S. Department of Defense changed its description of competition with China from "great power competition" to "strategic competition".
