= 2023 Ybor City shooting =

Mass shooting in Florida, U.S.

Coordinates: 27.9591°N 82.4422°W

- Location: Ybor City, Tampa, Florida, U.S.
- Date: October 29, 2023; 3 years ago (EDT)
- Attack type: Mass shooting, double-murder, pedicide
- Weapon: 10mm Glock 29 semi-automatic pistol
- Deaths: 2
- Injuries: 16
- Accused: Tyrell Phillips; Dwayne Tillman, Jr; Kayden Abney

On October 29, 2023, at around 3:00 am, a mass shooting occurred in the Ybor City district of Tampa, Florida, United States, at the popular tourist area of 7th Ave. A fight broke out between two groups, killing 20-year-old Harrison Boonstoppel and 14-year-old Elijah Wilson, and injuring 16 others. Three suspects have been arrested, one at the scene, while police believe another is at large.

The suspects are believed to be members of the “No Hesitation Committee” (NHC) and K4K, which police say means “Kill for Kamari”, a reference to a friend; Kamari Kerr, who died four years earlier. They say the group's initials stand for “Kindness for Kamari”. The suspects are believed to be former students of Braulio Alonso and A. P. Leto High Schools. When the suspects appeared in court, prosecutors presented online video evidence of escalating tensions between the two groups.

== Accused ==
One suspect has been arrested and identified as Tyrell Phillips. According to court documents, Philips told police he got into an altercation with a group of people, resulting in him shooting in fear for his safety. Investigators believe additional people fired during the shooting.

Over a month after the shootings, 14-year-old Kayden Abney and 21-year-old Dwayne Tillman Jr. were arrested and charged in relation to the shootings. Police believe there is still at least one more shooter at large.

== Reactions ==
A day after the shooting, Gwen Henderson, a Tampa council member, suggested that businesses close at 1:00 am for six months following the shooting. Community members and business owners claimed it was "another gut punch" and would not bring light to the real issues. The proposal was rejected.

On November 14, Ybor City hosted a meeting to discuss how to move forward after October 29. Speakers at the meeting expressed frustration and disappointment with the city.
