= 2023 Yukon high-altitude object =

Shootdown incident over Yukon, Canada

- Approximate location where the object was shot down.
- Date: February 11, 2023
- Location: Yukon, Canada
- Type: Airspace violator
- Outcome: Downed by an AIM-9 Sidewinder missile fired by a U.S. Air Force F-22 Raptor

On February 11, 2023, NORAD, at the direction of the Canadian Minister of National Defence and Chief of the Defence Staff, downed an unidentified object over Yukon.

After snowfall in the area made the debris difficult to find, the search was called off on February 17.

== Background ==
The object was downed a day after an Alaskan high-altitude object was shot down, and a week after the 2023 Chinese balloon incident.

== Detection and flight path ==
The prime minister of Canada, Justin Trudeau, said NORAD monitored the object and deployed American and Canadian aircraft. Two U.S. Air Force F-22s from Joint Base Elmendorf–Richardson, assisted by refueling aircraft, monitored the object over U.S. airspace and continued to monitor it as it entered Canadian airspace. Royal Canadian Air Force CF-18 and CP-140 aircraft joined the formation monitoring the object after it passed into Canadian airspace.

== Description ==
According to The Wall Street Journal, the object appeared to be a "small metallic balloon with a tethered payload". On February 12, after receiving a briefing from the United States National Security Council, U.S. Senate Majority Leader Chuck Schumer said that the U.S. believes that both the Yukon and Alaska objects were balloons. National Security Council spokesman John Kirby stated that they were considering that the balloon, as well as other balloons shot down during the same time period, were "tied to commercial or research entities and therefore totally benign." An anonymous Canadian official speaking to The Globe and Mail stated that the object was believed to be a surveillance balloon of Chinese or Russian origin.

Minister of National Defence Anita Anand said the object was flying at an altitude of approximately 40,000 feet and posed a reasonable threat to the safety of civilian flight. She called it cylindrical and smaller than the Chinese balloon shot down a few days earlier. Anand dismissed the idea that there was any reason the impact of the object was of public concern. The White House said president Joe Biden and Trudeau had "discussed the importance of recovering the object in order to determine more details on its purpose or origin".

Amateur radio enthusiasts speculated that the object may be an amateur radio pico balloon with callsign K9YO, from the fact that the balloon's last reported contact was immediately before it drifted over Yukon, at around the same place and time where the shootdown was reported. The balloon had been airborne for 124 days and circumnavigated the globe 7 times before being reported missing. High-altitude, circumnavigational pico balloons cost between $12 and $180, weigh less than 6 lb and are filled with helium or hydrogen gas. Hobbyists have been using them for a decade. Pico balloons are small enough they are not considered a hazard to aircraft, and thus this balloon was registered with the Federal Communications Commission but not the Federal Aviation Administration.

== Shootdown ==
NORAD ordered a USAF F-22 to down the object in Canadian airspace, marking the fighter's third air-to-air kill. The object was shot down at 3:41 a.m. local time. The object will also be investigated by the Royal Canadian Mounted Police with assistance from the Federal Bureau of Investigation. This shoot down marked the first deployment of NORAD to down an aerial object within the 64-year history of the US-Canadian aerospace warning and air sovereignty organization.

== Recovery operations ==
Canadian military and police forces searched for remnants of the object across a large portion of Yukon, roughly between Dawson City and Mayo. The Royal Canadian Mounted Police (RCMP) said that the search area encompassed 3,000 km^{2} (1,870 sq miles) of "rugged mountain terrain with a very high level of snowpack" in Yukon. Canadian Defence Minister Anand said that the debris was located somewhere "northeast of Dawson City" in a remote location amid "complex alpine terrain that is prone to challenging northern weather conditions." Officials cautioned that, due to the vastness and harsh conditions of Yukon, it is possible that the object will not be located.

The RCMP lead the search effort, with coordination by Public Safety Canada and assistance from Yukon-based units of the Canadian Armed Forces. The U.S. military, FBI, and U.S. Coast Guard also participated. Royal Canadian Air Force assets deployed in the recovery effort included one CC-130H Hercules search-and-rescue aircraft, two CC-138 Twin Otter utility aircraft, and various CH-148 Cyclone and CH-149 Cormorant helicopters.

After snowfall in the area made the debris difficult to find, the search was called off on February 17.

== See also ==
- List of high-altitude object events in 2023
