= 2023 Alaska high-altitude object =

Shootdown incident over Alaska, USA

- The location of Deadhorse, where the object was shot down off the coast.
- Date: February 10, 2023
- Location: Beaufort Sea
- Type: Airspace violator
- Outcome: Shot down by a U.S. Air Force F-22 Raptor

On February 10, 2023, the United States Air Force shot down a high-altitude object that had entered U.S. airspace over Alaska a day before. The object was shot down onto the Beaufort Sea. The Department of Defense said it was the size of a small car and flying northeast at approximately 40,000 feet (12,000 m), posing a risk to civilian flight. On February 16, 2023, U.S. President Joe Biden stated that the downed object was probably a civilian-owned balloon and "most likely tied to private companies, recreation or research institutions".

An attempt was made to recover the debris, which landed in the sea. However, on February 18, 2023, it was reported that the search had been abandoned.

== Background ==
The object in Alaska was detected less than one week after a Chinese balloon (Note: Alleged by the U.S. and Canada to be an observation balloon, claimed by China to be a weather balloon) was detected by the U.S. and shot down over the Atlantic. United States National Security Council coordinator John Kirby said it was "much, much smaller than the spy balloon that we took down last Saturday" and was about the size of a small car. The Chinese balloon shot down in the Atlantic was at 60,000 feet (18,000 m), while the Alaska object was at about 40,000 feet (12,000 m), thus presenting a greater threat to commercial aircraft.

On February 11, another high-altitude object was shot down in Yukon.

== Detection, description, and flight path ==
The unidentified flying object was described as cylindrical, silver, and appearing to float. It was detected by U.S. radar at 9 p.m. AKST on February 9 and U.S. Northern Command sent an E-3 Sentry AWACS aircraft to track it, supported by inflight refueling. Two flypasts were conducted, one on the evening of February 9 and the other on the morning of February 10. F-35 fighter jets from Eielson Air Force Base and F-22 fighter jets from Joint Base Elmendorf–Richardson (JBER) were deployed to make a visual inspection. They found that the object was uncrewed.

A source briefed on the intelligence told CNN that the pilots gave differing accounts of what they had seen. Some pilots said that the object "interfered with their sensors" on their aircraft but other pilots did not report this. Some pilots said that they could not identify any means of propulsion on the object. One U.S. official told CNN that the object did not appear to have any surveillance equipment.

According to U.S. officials, the object had traveled over Alaska before heading northward to sea at a speed of 20 to 40 miles per hour (32 to 64 km/h).

== Shootdown ==
At around 10:45 a.m. AKST on February 10, the object was shot down by an AIM-9X Sidewinder fired by an F-22 Raptor from JBER, marking the model's second air-to-air kill.

President Joe Biden ordered the shootdown, out of what Kirby called an "abundance of caution". Pentagon press secretary Pat Ryder called it "a reasonable threat to the safety of civilian flight".

== Recovery operations ==
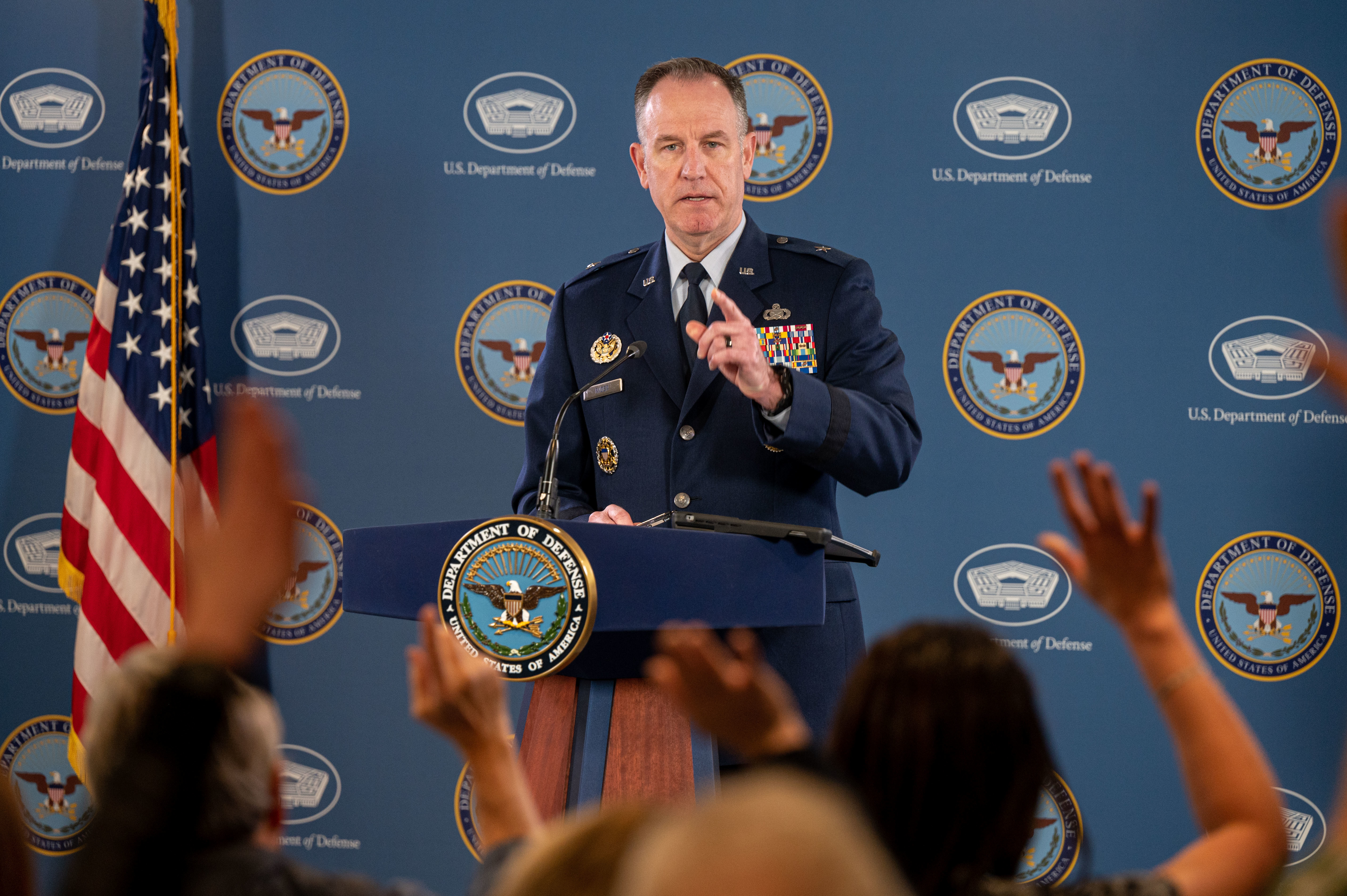
U.S. Air Force Brigadier General Patrick Ryder during a press briefing at the Pentagon.

The object landed on the frozen sea off Deadhorse, near the Prudhoe Bay Oil Field, in the territorial waters of the United States. A Department of Defense official said it broke into pieces.

The U.S. Navy, U.S. Coast Guard and FBI participated in efforts to recover the object. Search and rescue aircraft such as the CH-47 Chinook, HC-130 and HH-60 Pave Hawk were used in the effort.

It remains unclear who owned the object. On February 11, U.S. Northern Command said they had no new information to share about the "capabilities, purpose or origin" of the object, and that recovery operations continued but were affected by Arctic weather conditions, such as wind chill, snow and limited daylight hours. A Pentagon spokesman said on the same day that recovery teams were collecting the debris on top of the ice. U.S. divers and unmanned underwater vehicles retrieved additional debris.

On February 18, 2023, it was reported that the search had been abandoned.

== Reactions ==
President Biden said that the shootdown was a success. Canadian Prime Minister Justin Trudeau said he was briefed on the incursion and "supported the decision to take action".

In a statement made shortly after the object was downed, Alaska Governor Mike Dunleavy said it "raises serious national security concerns that should concern every American", that it is a reminder of Alaska's geopolitical strategic importance and that the Alaska National Guard is "working closely with USNORTHCOM and other agencies to provide any support as requested".

The White House stated the leading explanation for the objects was "commercial or research entities and therefore totally benign".

== See also ==
- List of high-altitude object events in 2023
