= Keva =

Keva or KEVA may refer to:

- Keva (mythology), a character in the Fenian Cycle of Irish mythology
- Keva (pension agency), a Finnish pension agency
- Keva Bethel (1935–2011), Bahamian educator
- KEVA (1240 AM), a defunct radio station located in Evanston, Wyoming
- KEVA planks, wooden toys
- Kevā, a village in Iran
