= Intermountain Intertie =

Amateur radio linked repeater system

The Intermountain Intertie is the largest linked amateur radio repeater system in the state of Utah. Managed by the Utah VHF Society, the Intermountain Intertie primarily covers areas west of the Wasatch Front, from Saint George to Tremonton. The Intermountain Intertie also covers areas in the northwest of Utah up to Boise, Idaho and toward the northeast into Evanston, Wyoming and Rock Springs, Wyoming. The Intertie further reaches into parts of Montana, and Arizona. There are no Intermountain Intertie repeaters east of I-15 on I-70; in this area, the Sinbad Desert Amateur Radio Club Intertie has substantial coverage.

== The Intermountain Intertie ==
The Hidden Peak Repeater, on top of the Snowbird Tram, is the primary hub repeater for the Intermountain Intertie. Linked directly to Hidden Peak is Farnsworth Peak, which connects to southern and western Utah. Also connected to Hidden Peak is Malad Pass, a Simplex Carrier Squelch linking Idaho to the Intertie, Medicine Butte in Evanston, Wyoming connecting Wyoming to the Intertie, and Laketown, Utah connecting Bear Lake to the Intertie. Each of the repeaters connecting to Hidden Peak has repeaters connected to them.

=== Intertie Linked Repeaters ===
Not all repeaters are connected full time to the Intermountain Intertie. Repeaters outside the state of Utah are connected to the Intermountain Intertie at the discretion of the owners of the out of state repeaters.

RX Freq	+/-	Step	Tone	Site Name	CALL	Location	State	Sponsor
147.1200	(+)	0.60	100.0	Farnsworth Peak (KSTU-TV Site)	K7JL	Salt Lake City, Utah	UT	K7JL
147.1800	(+)	0.60	100.0	Hidden Peak	K7JL	Snowbird, Utah	UT	K7JL
145.2700	(-)	0.60	100.0	Scotts Peak	K7JL	Brighton, Utah	UT	K7JL
145.2100	(-)	0.60	100.0	Ensign Peak	WA7VHF	Ensign Peak	UT	K7JL
449.4000	(-)	5.00	100.0	Ensign Peak	K7JL	Ensign Peak	UT	K7JL
449.5750	(-)	5.00	100.0	Orem	N7FOC	Orem, Utah	UT	
145.3500	(-)	0.60	100.0	Morgan Peak	WA7VHF	Morgan County, Utah	UT	
145.4900	(-)	0.60	100.0	Promontory Point	K7JL	Ogden, Utah	UT	K7JL
146.8600	(-)	0.60	100.0	Medicine Butte	K7JL	Evanston, Wyoming	WY	K7JL
147.0200	(+)	0.60	100.0	Bear Lake	K7OGM	Laketown, Utah	UT	K7JL
449.6500	(-)	5.00	100.0	Mt Pisgah	AC7II	Logan, Utah	UT	K7JL
145.2700	(-)	0.60	103.5	Levan Peak	K7JL	Levan, Utah	UT	K7JL
146.9400	(-)	0.60	100.0	Frisco Peak	WR7AAA	Milford, Utah	UT	
146.8400	(-)	0.60	100.0	Monroe Peak	WA7VHF	Richfield, Utah	UT	
146.8000	(-)	0.60	100.0	Blowhard Mtn	WV7H	Cedar City, Utah	UT	
146.8200	(-)	0.60	100.0	Utah Hill	KD7GEP	St. George, Utah	UT	
147.2000	(+)	0.60	100.0	Tod's Junction	WA7VHF	Hatch, Utah	UT	
448.6000	(-)	5.00	100.0	Navajo Mtn	WA7VHF	Page, Arizona	UT/AZ	
147.1200	(+)	0.60	100.0	Cedar Mtn	WX7Y	Castle Dale, Utah	UT	
147.3000	(+)	0.60	100.0	Jacob Lake	N7YSE	Fredonia, Arizona	AZ	
448.8750	(-)	5.00	100.0	Mt Elden	W7ARA	Flagstaff, Arizona	AZ	
449.1750	(-)	5.00	100.0	Towers Mountain	W7ARA	Prescott, Arizona	AZ	
441.6250	(+)	5.00	100.0	Scottsdale Airpark	W7ARA	Scottsdale, Arizona	AZ	
442.2750	(+)	5.00	100.0	White Tanks	W7ARA	Phoenix, Arizona	AZ	
146.8800	(-)	0.60	100.0	High Potosi	WA7HXO	Las Vegas, Nevada	NV	
447.2250	(+)	5.00	100.0	Malad	WA7VHF	Malad, Idaho	ID	
146.8500	(-)	0.60	100.0	Jumpoff Peak	WA7FDR	Arco, Idaho	ID	
145.2300	(-)	0.60	100.0	Sawtell	WA7FDR	West Yellowstone	ID/WY	
145.2700	(-)	0.60	100.0	Mt Harrison	WA7FDR	Burley, Idaho	ID	
145.1500	(-)	0.60	100.0	Mtn. Home	WA7FDR	Mountain Home, Idaho	ID	
145.1300	(-)	0.60	100.0	Shafer Butte	WA7FDR	Boise, Idaho	ID	
145.2100	(-)	0.60	100.0	Sedgwick Peak	WA7FDR	Lava Hot Springs, Idaho	ID	
146.6600	(-)	0.60	100.0	Snowbank	WA7FDR	Cascade, Idaho	ID	
147.1000	(+)	0.60	100.0	Malheur Butte	K7OJI	Ontario, Oregon	OR	

== Media and community appearances ==
- How 1 ham radio guy helped a special kids camp 180 miles away on fire - St. George News
- Boy Scouts of America "Operation On Target"
