= Medicine Butte =

Mountain in Uinta County, Wyoming

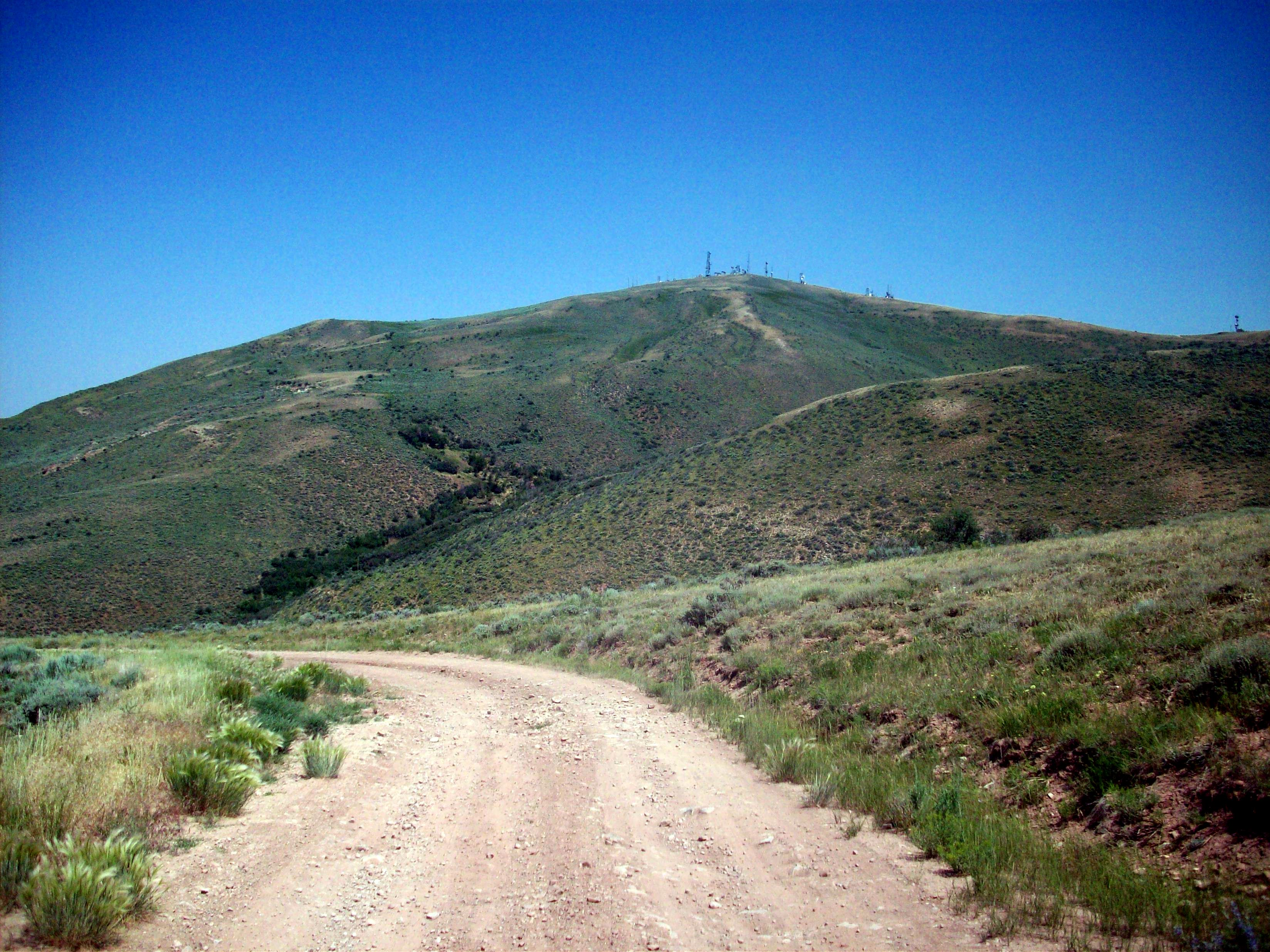
- Medicine Butte, as seen from the south, looking north

Highest point
- Elevation: 8,610 ft (2,620 m)
- Coordinates: 41°21′08.42″N 110°54′28.8″W

Geography
- Location within Wyoming Location within the United States
- Location: Uinta County, Wyoming
- Parent range: Uinta Mountains

Climbing
- Easiest route: Access road

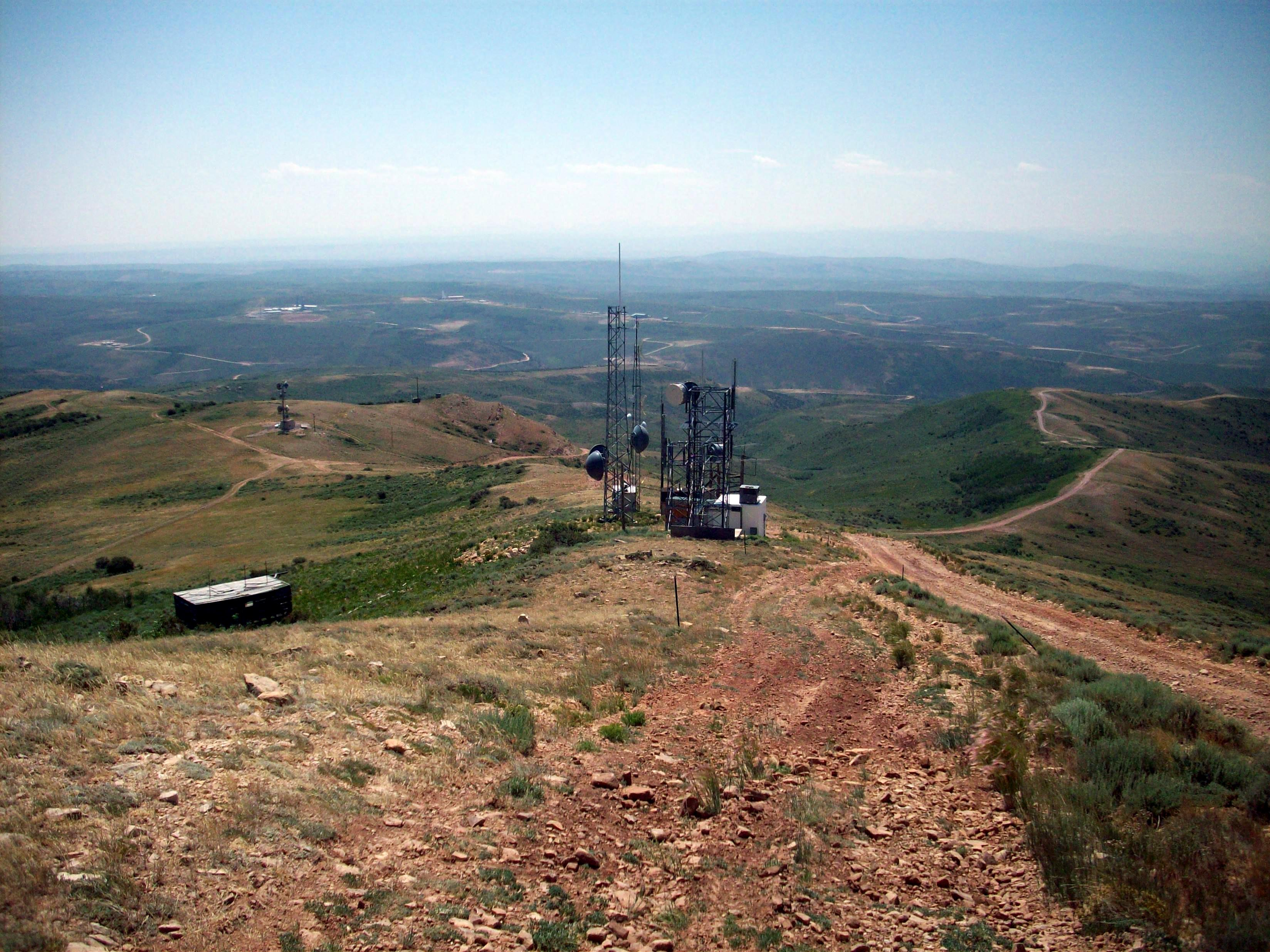
Looking to the southeast from Medicine Butte

Medicine Butte is a mountain located in Uinta County, approximately 6.9 miles (11 km) north of the city of Evanston, Wyoming. It is 8,610 feet (2,624 m) in elevation and can be reached via an access road. The mountain houses radio towers serving numerous local and regional services.

The mountain is named as such by Native Americans because of the great variety of herbs and roots that they used for medicine which were found on the slopes of the butte. The mountain is sometimes known as "Fremont’s Monument" for John C. Fremont.

== Geology ==
Medicine Butte is part of the Sevier orogeny landscape, which was a mountain-building event that began approximately 120 million years ago. Shallow sedimentary rocks were folded and thrust over one another. The Medicine Butte thrust fault is a structural feature in this area, where older sedimentary rocks were pushed eastward over younger formations. Sediments in the area date from the latest Cretaceous to the Paleocene. This includes the Hams Fork Conglomerate Member, consisting of boulder conglomerates and sandstones, and a main body of siltstone, sandstone, and carbonaceous claystone. Outcrops of the Evanston Formation are particularly visible at the southern end of Medicine Butte.

Red, yellow, and gray sandstone on the butte is part of the Wasatch Formation, named after the nearby Wasatch Range. The butte also contains rocks in the Fowkes Formation from the Eocene time period 56 to 33.9 million years ago (Ma). Its flat-topped appearance is typical of the resistant sandstone and conglomerate layers that cap many of the ridges in the Fossil Basin region.

== Radio use ==
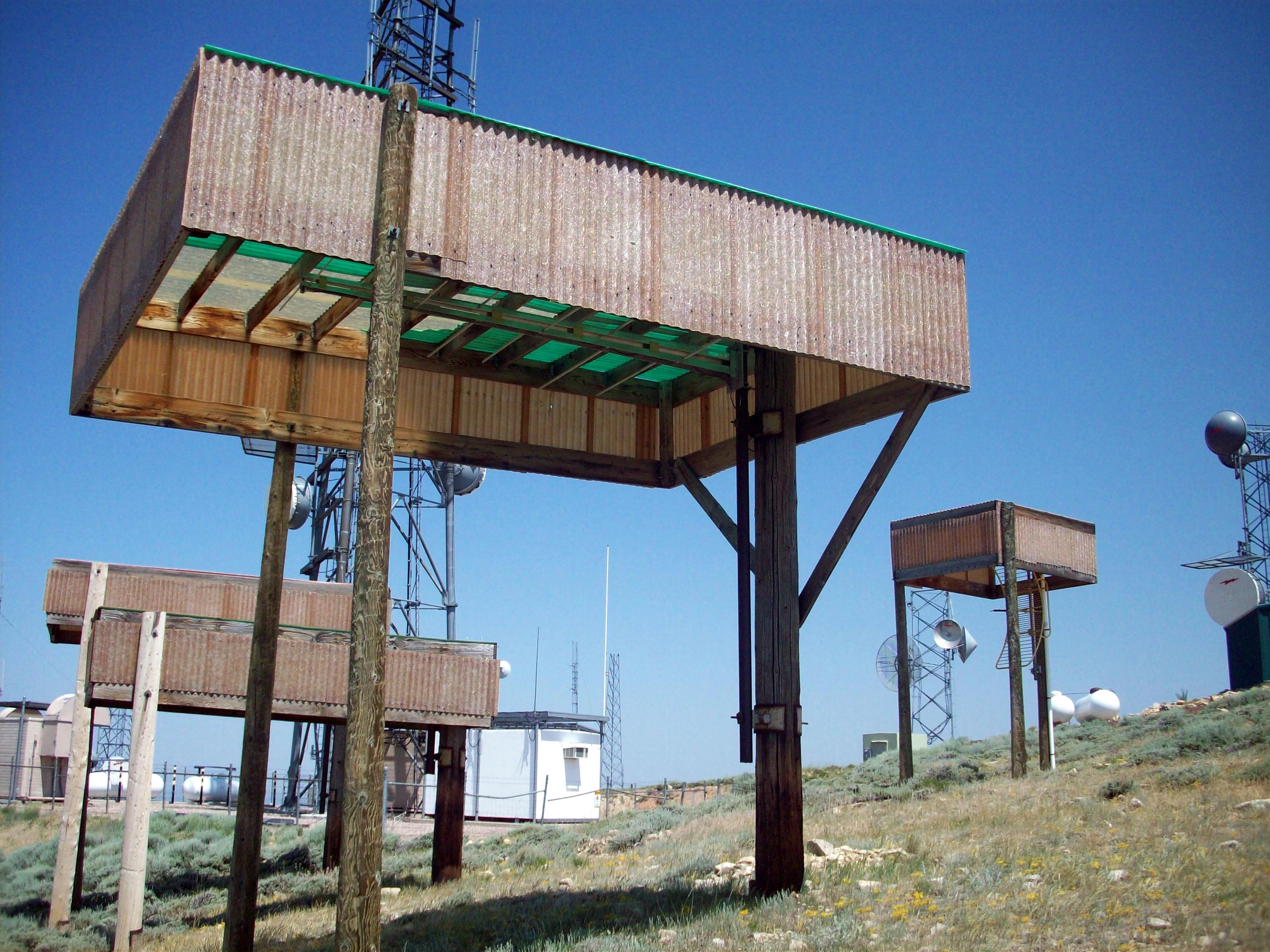
Radio transmitters on the mountain. The structures protect them from snow damage.

Radio towers for several different communications systems exist on the summit of the mountain. Most notable of these are two higher power FM radio stations, and numerous translators serving the local area. The following is a complete list of radio stations with transmitters located on the mountain, sorted by frequency:

Call sign	Frequency	Format
KUWE	89.7	Public radio
K212GA	90.3	Religious radio
KPMD	91.9	Christian Contemporary
K228AB	93.5	Public radio
K237FD	95.3	Christian contemporary
KADQ	98.3	Classic Rock
KNYN	99.1	Country

As well as housing towers and transmitters for radio stations, the mountain also has towers for amateur radio operations. It is owned by a resident from Manila, Utah and transmits on 146.680 MHz. Another amateur radio repeater nearby, transmits on 147.02 MHz. It is known as K70GM. Local companies and telecommunications services also carry towers on the mountain. Emergency systems for Evanston and Uinta County also broadcast from towers on Medicine Butte. Daggett County, Utah also has services transmitting from the mountain. The United States Forest Service owns a tower on the mountain.

=== KNYN ===
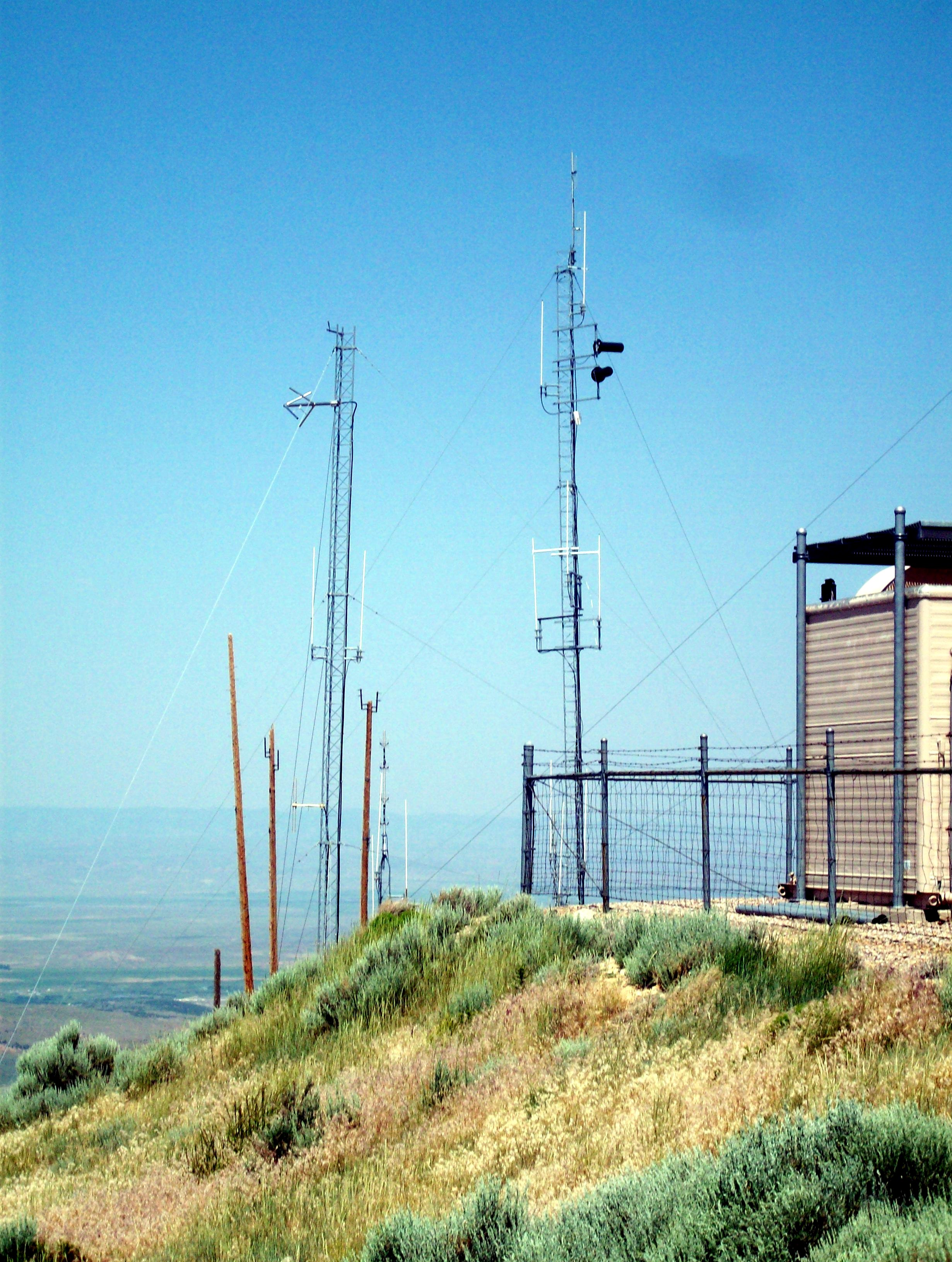
KNYN's temporary tower (center)

KNYN is the highest power radio station transmitting on the mountain. In 2005, the station suffered a partial tower collapse and has been running on lower power (and a backup transmitter) since. The cause of the collapse was apparently weather-related, as the area had experienced heavy icing.

== Television ==
Medicine Butte is commonly used to receive television signals from the Salt Lake City market, and relay them into rural parts of Wyoming and Idaho. The following is a complete list of television stations broadcasting from Medicine Butte to the surrounding area.

Call sign	Channel	Network
K16HW-D	16	KUED - PBS
K23DS-D	23	Wyoming Public Television
K27KV-D	27	The CW

== Access ==
Medicine Butte can be accessed via Red Willow Road, north of Evanston on US Highway 89. The road is used locally for the landfill of Evanston, but branches off to the left to climb the summit. The road is not in good condition in most places, and a four-wheel drive vehicle is recommended.
