= KRTK =

KRTK may refer to:

- KRTK (FM), a radio station (93.3 FM) licensed to serve Hermann, Missouri, United States
- KPCQ, a defunct radio station (1490 AM) formerly licensed to serve Chubbuck, Idaho, United States, which held the call sign KRTK from 1998 to 2019
- KLVH (FM), a radio station (97.1 FM) licensed to serve Cleveland, Texas, United States, which held the call sign KRTK from 1991 to 1995 and in 1997
