= Ensign Peak =

Mountain peak above Salt Lake City, Utah, United States

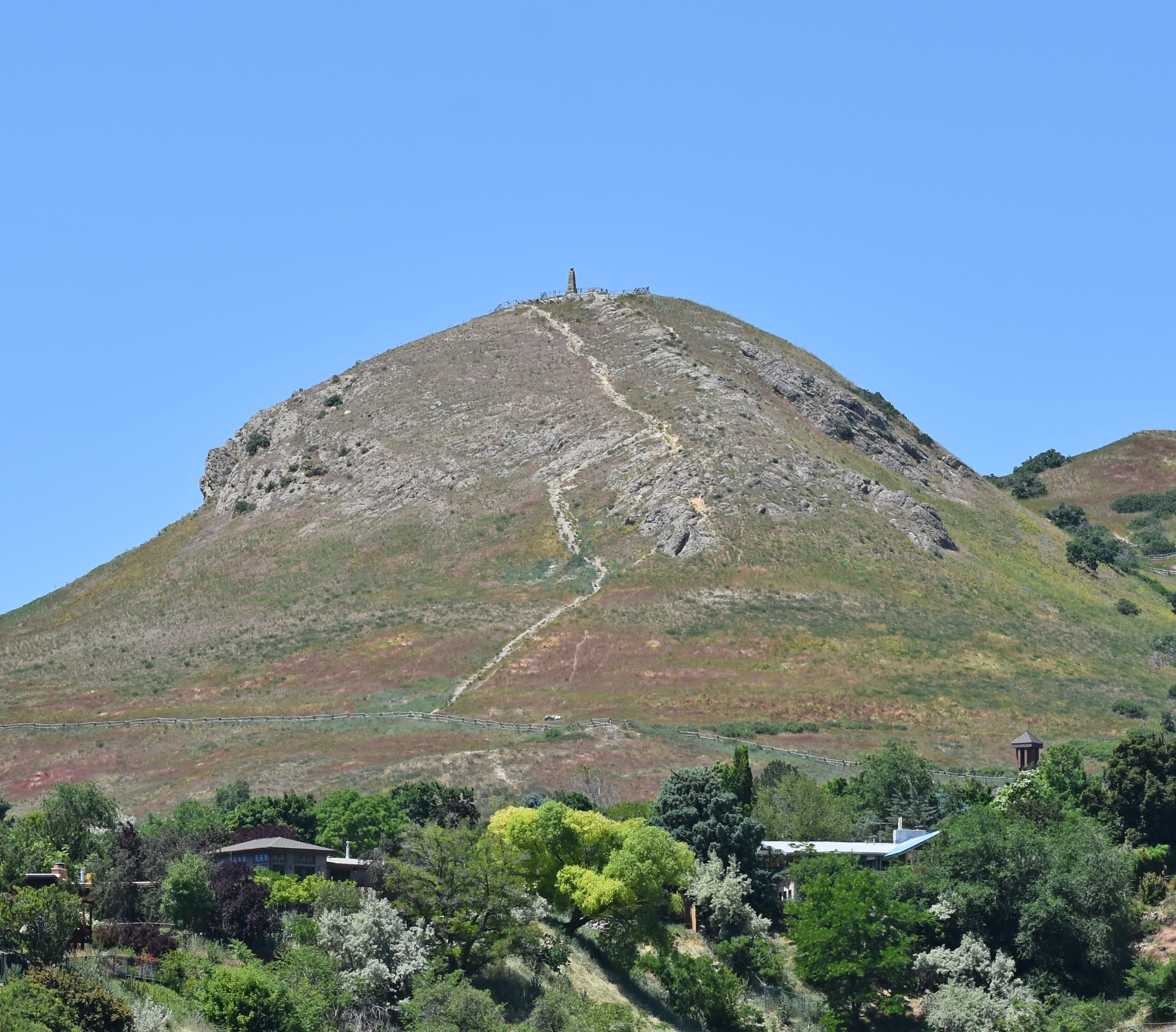

Highest point
- Elevation: 5,417 ft (1,651 m) NAVD 88
- Prominence: 64 ft (20 m)
- Coordinates: 40°47′40″N 111°53′26″W

Geography
- Location within Utah
- Location: Salt Lake City, Utah, United States
- Parent range: Wasatch Range
- Topo map: USGS Salt Lake City North

Climbing
- Easiest route: 0.47-mile (760 m) hike on Ensign Peak Trail

Ensign Peak (/ˈɛnsaɪn/ EN-syne) is a dome-shaped peak in the hills just north of downtown Salt Lake City, Utah. The peak and surrounding area are part of Ensign Peak Nature Park, which is owned by the city. The hill's summit is accessed via a popular hiking trail, and provides an elevated view of Salt Lake Valley and Great Salt Lake.

The peak is historically significant as it was a landmark during the establishment of Salt Lake City in July 1847, and also holds religious significance for members of the Church of Jesus Christ of Latter-day Saints (LDS Church). Because of this importance, in 1934, a stone monument was built atop the summit and interpretive signage was added when the nature park was developed in 1996.

Culturally, the significance of the peak has inspired a number of literary works, including the hymn "High on the Mountain Top." Several businesses and organizations, often affiliated with the LDS Church, have names inspired by the peak; such as Ensign College, Ensign Peak Advisors, and the Ensign Peak Foundation.

== Geology ==
The peak is part of a low range of hills called the "Salt Lake Salient" (also known as the "City Creek Spur") which projects westward from the Wasatch Range. The Salt Lake Salient forms the northern boundary of Salt Lake Valley.

The bedrock of Ensign Peak is a conglomerate, likely laid down during the Eocene epoch. This conglomerate is exposed on parts of the peak and in some nearby areas. When the ancient Lake Bonneville filled the valley, Ensign Peak was just above its highest shoreline.

The hill rises 1,080 feet (329.2 m) above the valley floor making it a prominent feature above the city. Although prominent, commentators have not always thought it a beautiful element of the landscape. The first mayor of Salt Lake City, Jedediah M. Grant, called it "a big toe of the Wahsatch range" while writing to the New York Herald in 1852, and it was later dubbed an "ugly nub" by a writer for the Deseret News.

== Significance ==
=== Settlement landmark ===
Early members of the Church of Jesus Christ of Latter-day Saints (LDS Church), commonly called Mormons or Latter-day Saints, were often the victims of anti-Mormon violence in the eastern and midwestern United States. Joseph Smith, the faith's founder, was killed in June 1844 and by 1846, the Latter-day Saints were forced from their main settlement at Nauvoo, Illinois. Those church members who chose to accept Brigham Young as their new leader would end up traveling to the Western United States by wagon train or handcart, along what became known as the Mormon Trail.

When Young's wagon train entered Salt Lake Valley on July 24, 1847 (presently celebrated as Pioneer Day in Utah), he stated the area was the right spot as soon as he saw it. During an 1869 sermon, a fellow church leader, George A. Smith, stated that after Smith's death, Young had been praying to know where to take the Latter-day Saints and had a vision of Joseph Smith. In the vision, Smith showed Young Ensign Peak and "there was an ensign fell upon that peak, and Joseph said, 'Build under the point where the colors fall and you will prosper and have peace.'"

A number of later visitors to Salt Lake City would write that they were told a similar story. British author William Hepworth Dixon wrote that Young told him as he was coming over the mountains, he had a dream of an angel standing on a conical hill, which pointed to an area where a new temple should be built. And when coming down into the valley, Young first looked for that cone-shaped hill. William Minturn also wrote that Young was shown by an angel, standing on a conical hill, where a temple should be built. He stated it was believed by some the angel was Joseph Smith. Richard Francis Burton, another British author, wrote that Young had seen Joseph Smith appear on Ensign Peak and point out the location for a new temple.

=== First climb ===
On July 26, two days after Young and the remainder of the first wagon train entered the valley, nine to 10 church leaders, including Young, climbed the peak. (Note: According to William Clayton's diary, the group included: Brigham Young, Heber C. Kimball, Willard Richards, Ezra T. Benson, George A. Smith, Wilford Woodruff, Albert Carrington, William Clayton, and Lorenzo Dow Young. Wilford Woodruff's diary indicates the group had 10 men, including Young. If Woodruff was correct, the 10th was presumably Orson Pratt, who may have mistakenly been left off Clayton's list.) Apostle Wilford Woodruff was the first to reach the summit of the hill and recorded in his diary for the day, "we all went onto the top of A high peak in the edge of the Mountain which we considered A good place to raise An ensign upon which we named ensign Peak or Hill." While at the top, they surveyed the region and Young decided to the build the city and its temple at the very base of the mountain's slope.

Tradition holds that the men planted an American flag atop the peak to claim what was then Mexican territory for the United States. This legend has often been repeated in literature and celebratory speeches, and the supposed event is even memorialized as part of the painted cyclorama in the Utah State Capitol rotunda. Early LDS Historians B. H. Roberts and Andrew Jenson both stated that evidence of the flag raising was lacking. In 1993, historian Ronald W. Walker wrote "there is not enough historical evidence to make either case." Instead, based on available accounts, it is believed that Heber C. Kimball tied his spotted yellow bandana to the end of Willard Richards' walking stick and waved it while the group was at the peak's summit.

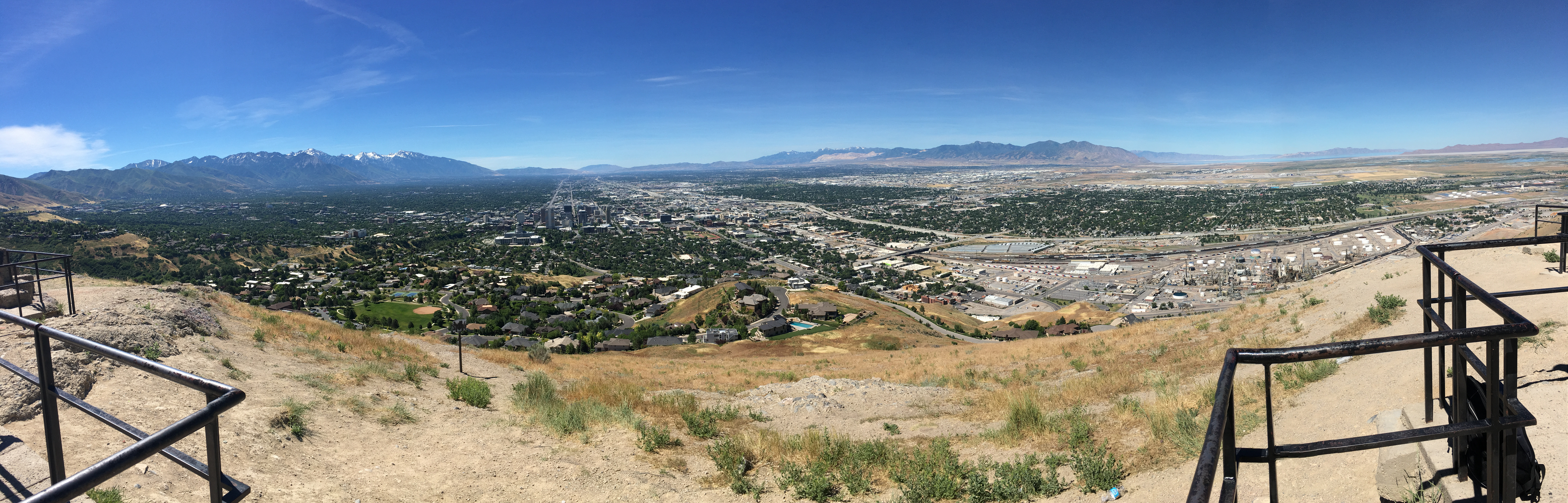
View of Salt Lake Valley from Ensign Peak, 2017

=== Usage of an "ensign" in Mormon doctrine ===
The religious significance of using an ensign (a flag or banner) began long before the Mormon pioneers arrived in Salt Lake Valley. Early in the church's history, Joseph Smith had claimed that in 1823, the angel Moroni appeared to him and quoted Joel 2:32 and Isaiah 11:9–12, in which is found wording related to "Mount Zion" and setting up an "ensign" for gathering.

While at Nauvoo, as church leadership grew disillusioned with the United States government for not protecting their rights, and hoping to find somewhere the church could have religious liberty, the Council of Fifty was given the responsibility of looking for a place to resettle, if necessary. The American West was one of those places considered by the council. In what appears to be a literal attempt to fulfill scripture, Smith asked his followers to create a flag "for the nations" that he could take to the Rocky Mountains.

After Smith's death, while the church was headquartered in a temporary settlement called Winter Quarters, Brigham Young became ill and claimed to have a near-death experience, in which he "actually went into Eternity...[and] came back." Young stated he spoke to Smith during this event, which appears to revived interest in flying an "ensign" where the Latter-day Saints settled. Soon after Young's experience, Jedediah M. Grant was sent from Winter Quarters to the east, on a mission to obtain material for a large flag. Grant was successful in finding material, and a large flag, known as the "mammoth flag," was flown somewhere over Salt Lake City for many years.

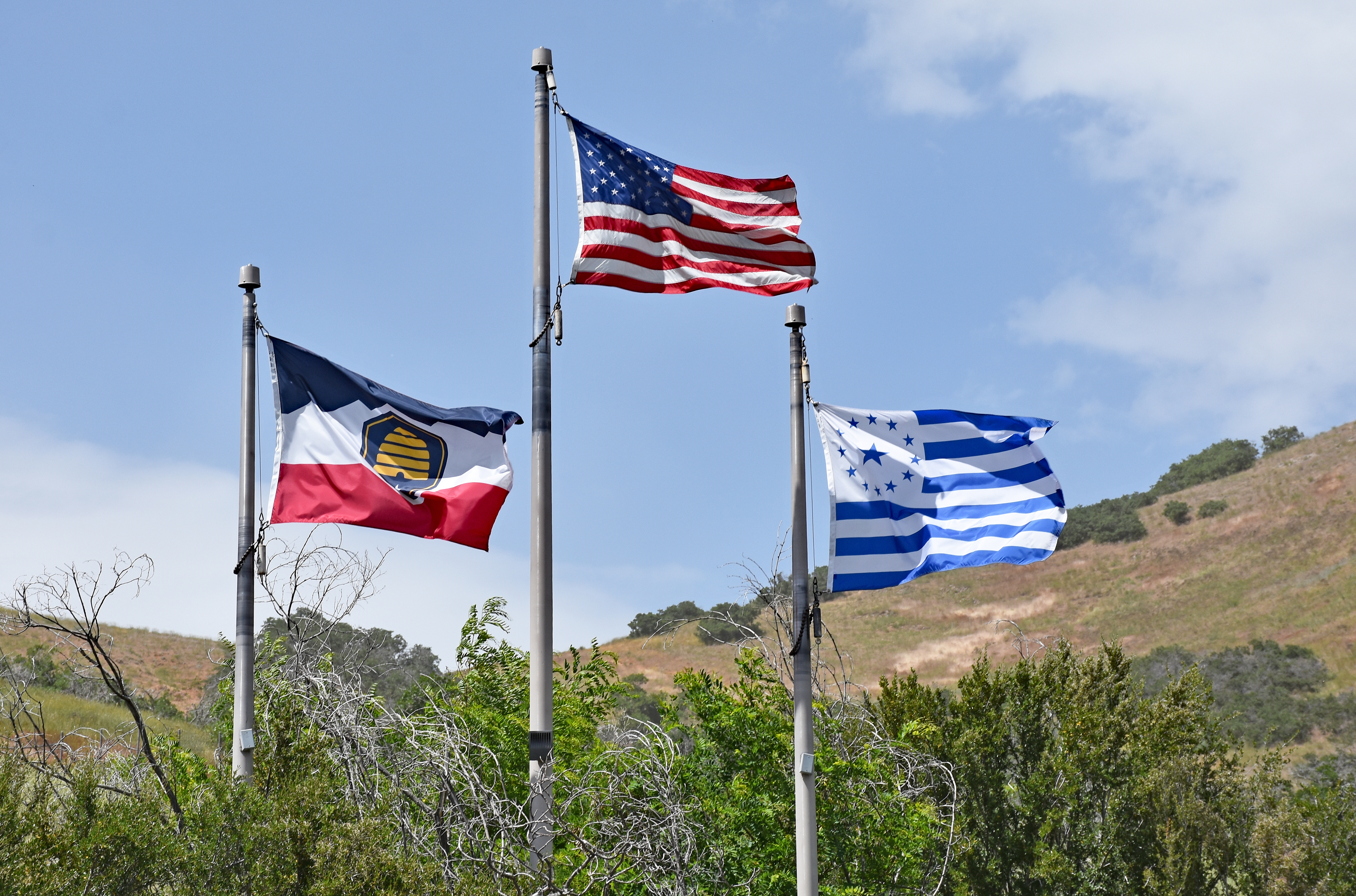
The Flag of Utah, Flag of the United States, and a variant of the Flag of the Kingdom/Flag of Deseret fly at the Ensign Peak trailhead, 2024

Before and after arriving in Salt Lake City, as the Latter-day Saints discussed their flags they used a variety of names, including "Flag of Liberty," "Flag of the Kingdom," "Deseret Flag," "mammoth flag," and "flag of all the nations." Often they were vague about their flag's appearance, instead focusing on the symbolism of gathering and the establishment of what they believed to be God's kingdom, rather than a standard shape, design or name of a banner. As part of the 2020s renovation of Temple Square, the church installed flagpoles allowing 91 national flags to be flown at once, as a symbol of the global nature of their church.

=== Later usage of the peak by Latter-day Saints ===
On July 21, 1849, several church leaders, including Brigham Young, climbed the hill and consecrated it for "the erection of a standard thereon [and for] a place of prayer." That same day, Addison Pratt received his endowment atop the peak (in a ceremony usually reserved for the religion's temples). Into the twentieth century, the hill remained a place of contemplation and prayer for some Latter-day Saints. (Note: In the 1930s, Uinta Basin colonizer William Smart spent time contemplating and praying atop Ensign Peak, and constructed an altar there for those purposes.) After the LDS Church stopped its practice of polygamy, some fundamentalist Mormon groups may have used the peak for religious ceremonies and marriages, as they were unable to enter LDS temples.

== Flag flying ==
While no flag was flown atop the peak during the first climb by the newly arrived pioneers on July 26, 1847, a flag was raised soon after and numerous flags have been flown during the many decades since.

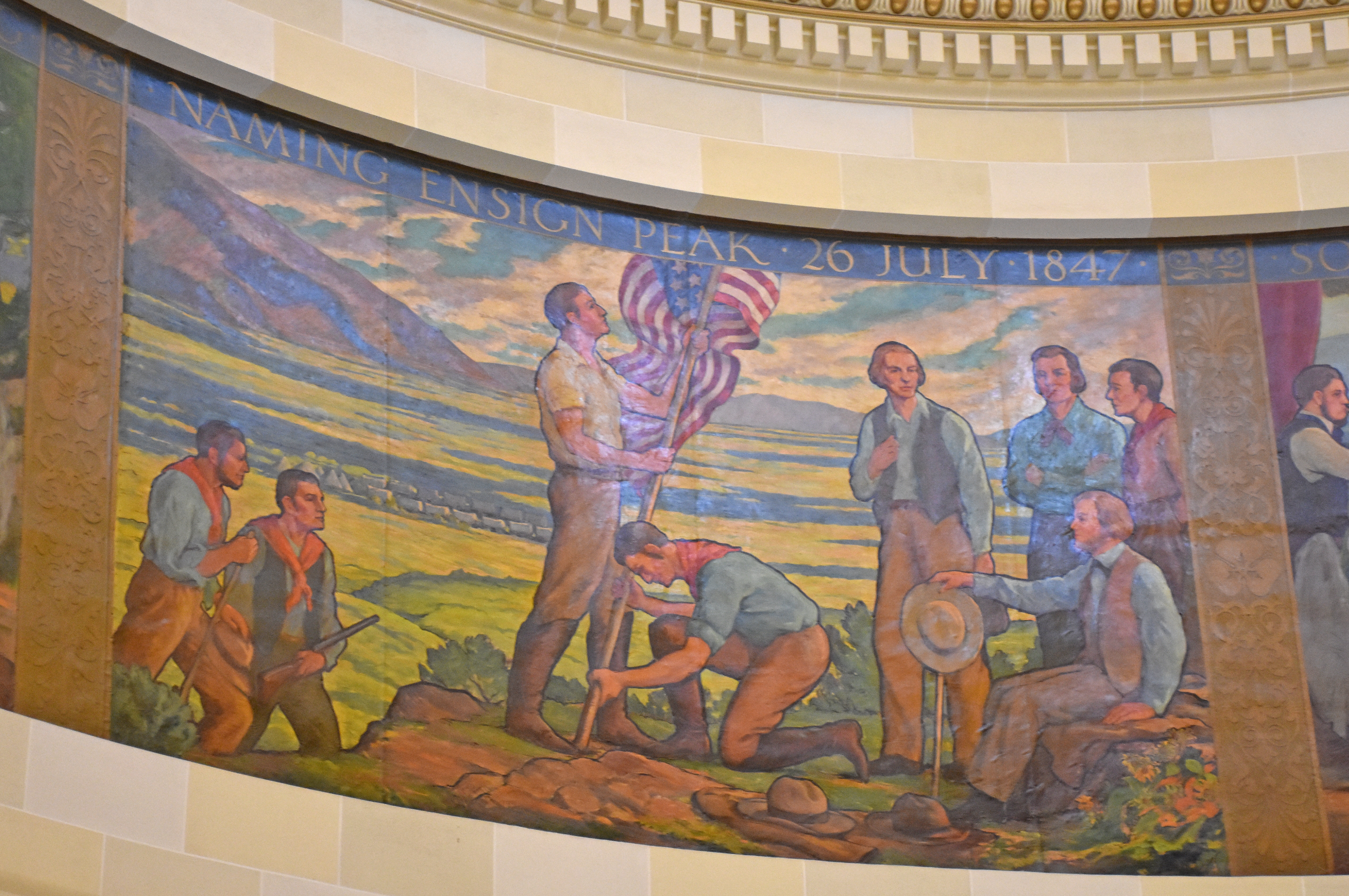
The Utah State Capitol rotunda's cyclorama depicts a fictional flag raising at Ensign Peak on July 26, 1847

John P. Wriston, a member of the Mormon Battalion, arrived in the valley not long after Young, and claimed to help raise an American flag on the peak, declaring "I feel rejoice at having the privelage [sic] of seeing the flag raised that was spoken of by Isai[a]h the prophet." Another early pioneer, Harrison Sperry, recalled seeing a flag raised on Ensign Peak, and the Deseret News claimed, in 1897, that a flag had been unfurled atop the peak three weeks after the pioneers' first arrival. As part of the first Pioneer Day celebrations held in 1849, a variant of the Flag of the Kingdom/Flag of Deseret may have been flown on the peak.

A permanent flagpole was placed on the peak by the Salt Lake Herald newspaper in 1897 as part of a semi-centennial celebration of the pioneer arrival. The Herald formed the "Herald Ensign Peak Flag Association" to solicit donations early that year and contributions came from as far as Switzerland. With assistance from the Utah National Guard's signal corp, a spot for the flagpole was located on the peak, so as to appear in the very center of the hill when viewed from the city below. The pole, just over 100 feet (30 m) high and made of iron, was placed on July 17, 1897. The US flag was then raised on this pole on July 24, 1897, 50 years after the arrival of the pioneers.

The 1897 flagpole, damaged by bullets and wind, was replaced by a three-legged pole in 1915. As part of the centennial celebration of the arrival of the pioneers, a new pole was erected in 1947. The first flag to fly on this pole was raised on May 1 and it was planned to fly it continuously until the official end of celebrations on October 15, but after Governor Herbert B. Maw requested permission to do so from President Harry S. Truman, the president encouraged the centennial commission that it be lowered each evening and instead the flag only flew on special days during the celebration period.

In 1955, the local United Veterans' Council asked permission to install their own flagpole on the peak. The request was granted, and with the help of the Utah National Guard, a hole was blasted for the pole, the explosion causing concern for the residents of Salt Lake City. This new flagpole was dedicate on November 11, Veterans Day. Vandals largely destroyed the pole in 1958, and its salvaged pieces were used to create a new flagpole which was placed in front of the Salt Lake City Council Hall in 1963.

When the nature park was dedicated in 1996, three flagpoles were constructed at the trailhead entrance plaza near the base of the peak. The poles allow the Flag of the United States, Flag of Utah, and a variant of the Flag of the Kingdom/Flag of Deseret to be flown.

== Monuments ==
=== Early attempts ===
In May 1916, Charles W. Nibley, the LDS Church's Presiding Bishop, petitioned the Salt Lake City Commission for permission for the church to build a large cross on the peak. The cross would be a symbol of Christianity and serve as a memorial to the Mormon pioneers, and was planned to be constructed of concrete and steel, large enough to be visible from everywhere in the city. The plan was met with much opposition, especially from Utah's Jewish and secular communities. Even so, the commission approved construction of the cross later that month. Those opposed filed suit in court and the issue was not settled until 1918, when the church agreed not to build the cross.

=== 1934 monument ===
1934 monument
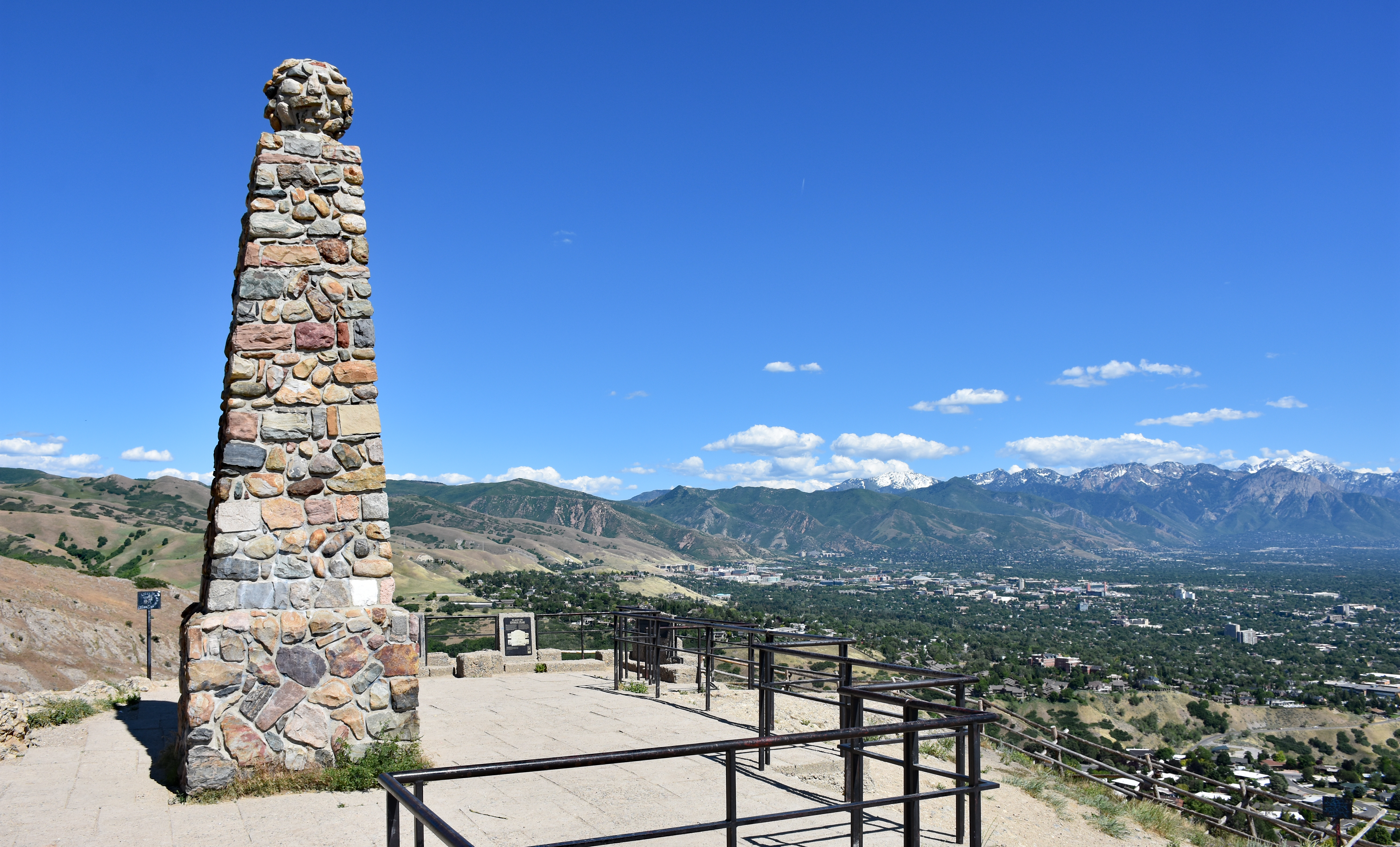
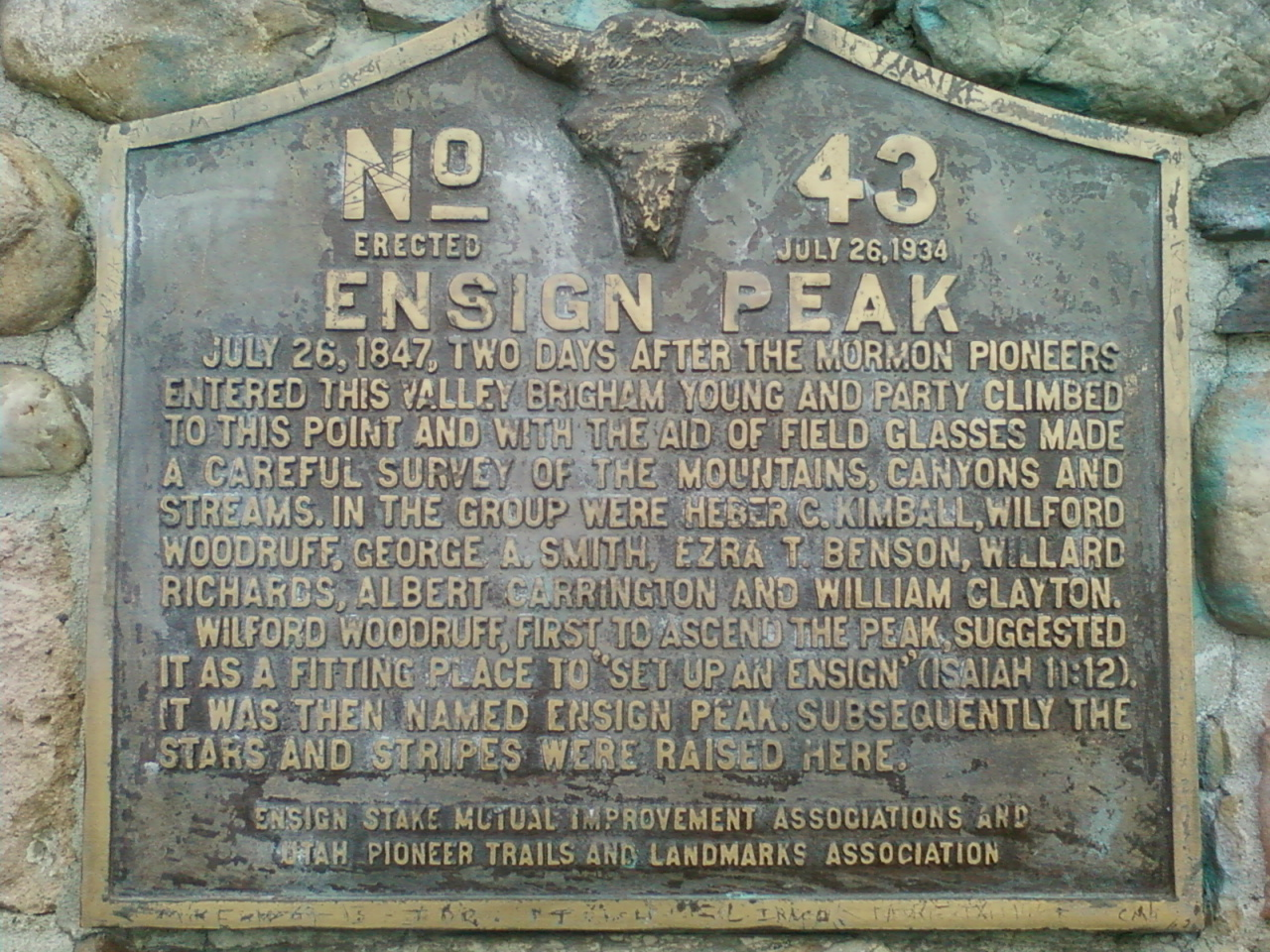

In May 1934, the Ensign LDS Stake's Mutual Improvement Associations, in cooperation with the Utah Pioneer Trails and Landmarks Association (UPTLA), announced that they would construct a stone monument atop the peak. They requested that every stake in the church and every mission in the United States send a stone from their nearby historic sites, that then would be incorporated into the face of the monument.

The first stone to arrive came from Lethbridge, Canada, and was from a quarry that provided stone for many historic structures in southern Alberta. Numerous other stones would be sent, including from the gravesite of Buffalo Bill, and from sites such as Independence Rock, Martin's Cove, Hill Cumorah, Donner Pass, and so forth.

Construction began on July 17 and the completed monument was unveiled on July 26, the 86th anniversary of the first climb by the pioneers. Nearly 500 people attended the unveiling ceremony at the summit of the peak, including two members of the church's first presidency, Heber J. Grant and Anthony W. Ivins. The unveiling was done by nine young women, all descendants of those who had made the first climb. The monument is 18.47 feet (5.63 m) high (in honor of 1847, the arrival year of the Mormon pioneers) and roughly 100 stones from historic locations were included in its construction. A bronze interpretive plaque, supplied by the UPTLA, was built into the monument's face.

== Parks ==
Plans to improve the peak as a park came and went over the years, all without serious action until the 1990s. In 1953, Salt Lake City sold the land below the peak, known as Ensign Flats, to developers who then constructed the Ensign Downs neighborhood. Only 9 acres (3.6 ha) at the very top of the peak were retained by the city. By the 1980s, as development of the neighborhood continued, city residents became concerned with possible encroachment onto the hillside. The city then entered negotiations with the developer, who agreed to give the city back 66 acres (27 ha) of land at the peak, in exchange for the city giving up additional property in the hills above downtown and rezoning portions to allow for gated communities.

=== Ensign Peak Nature Park ===
As the city was reacquiring land around the hillside, a group of interested citizens formed the Ensign Peak Foundation to improve the peak. After several years of raising funds, the foundation, along with community and church leaders, broke ground on the project on April 17, 1996. The completed project, which included the Ensign Peak improvements and developing the larger Ensign Peak Nature Park, was dedicated by the church's President, Gordon B. Hinckley, on July 26, 1997, 149 years after the first climb by the pioneers. 1,000 people attended the dedication held at the base of the peak, which included a ribbon-cutting by nine girls and women, all descendants of those who had made the first climb.

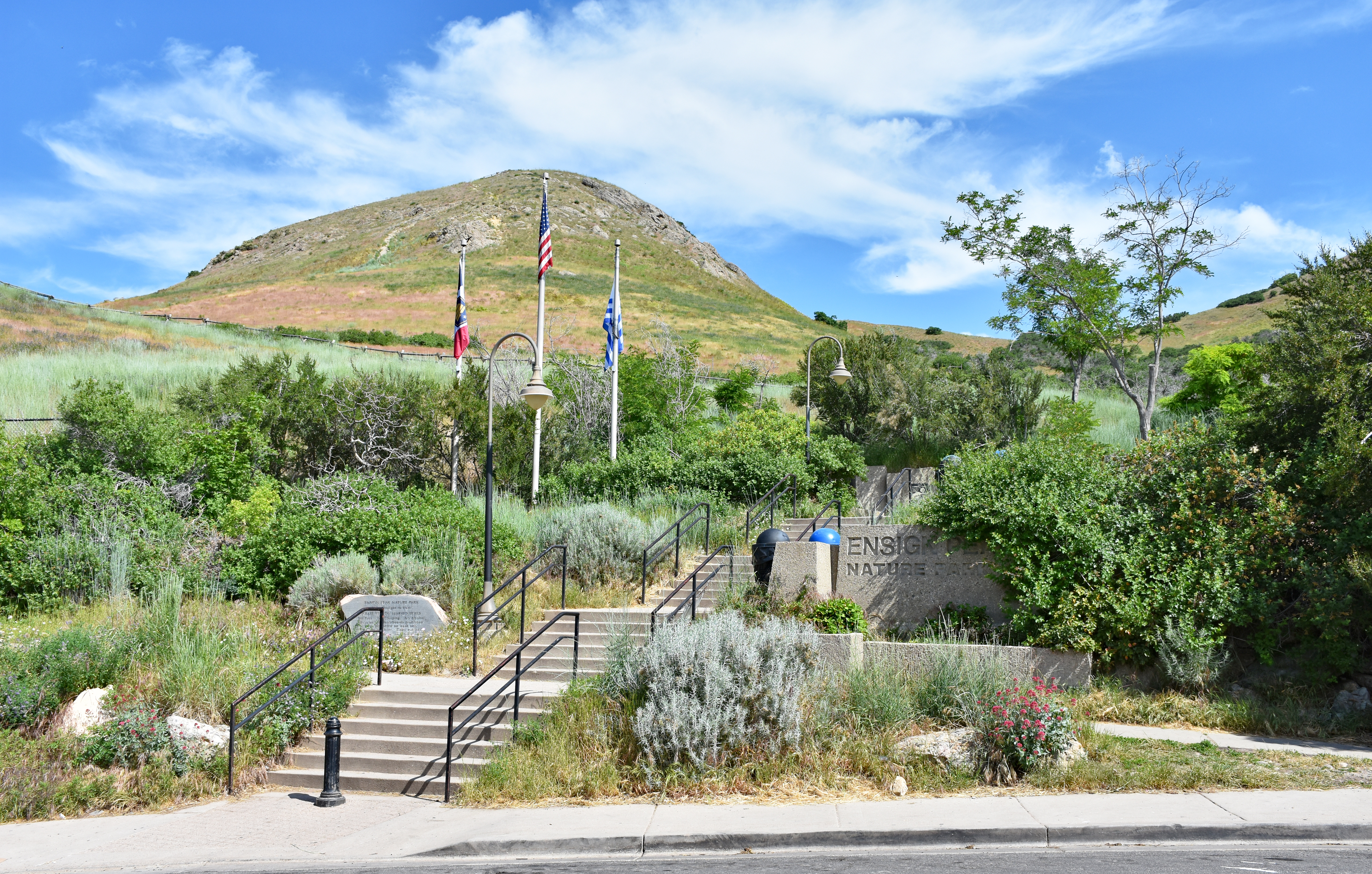
Ensign Peak trailhead and entrance to Ensign Peak Nature Park, the peak is visible above the flagpoles

The improvements included an entrance plaza at the trailhead. This plaza was built 47 feet (14.3 m) from the street to represent 1847, the year the Mormon pioneers first entered the valley. The paving of the plaza features a world map, and when standing on the location of Salt Lake City, the peak is visible in a cleft of the plaza wall. Nine pedestals surround the world map, symbolizing the nine men who originally climbed the hill. The plaza wall's design is inspired by the rock formations of the peak and imbedded in that wall are several interpretive signs. The plaza also features three flagpoles, allowing the Flag of the United States, Flag of Utah, and a variant of the Flag of the Kingdom/Flag of Deseret to be flown. A permanent hiking trail was established with stations featuring information on the valley and Great Salt Lake, and reclamation work and reseeding was done to unauthorized roads and trails on the hill. At the summit of the peak, the 1934 monument was refurbished and several interpretive signs added.

=== Ensign Peak Memorial Garden ===
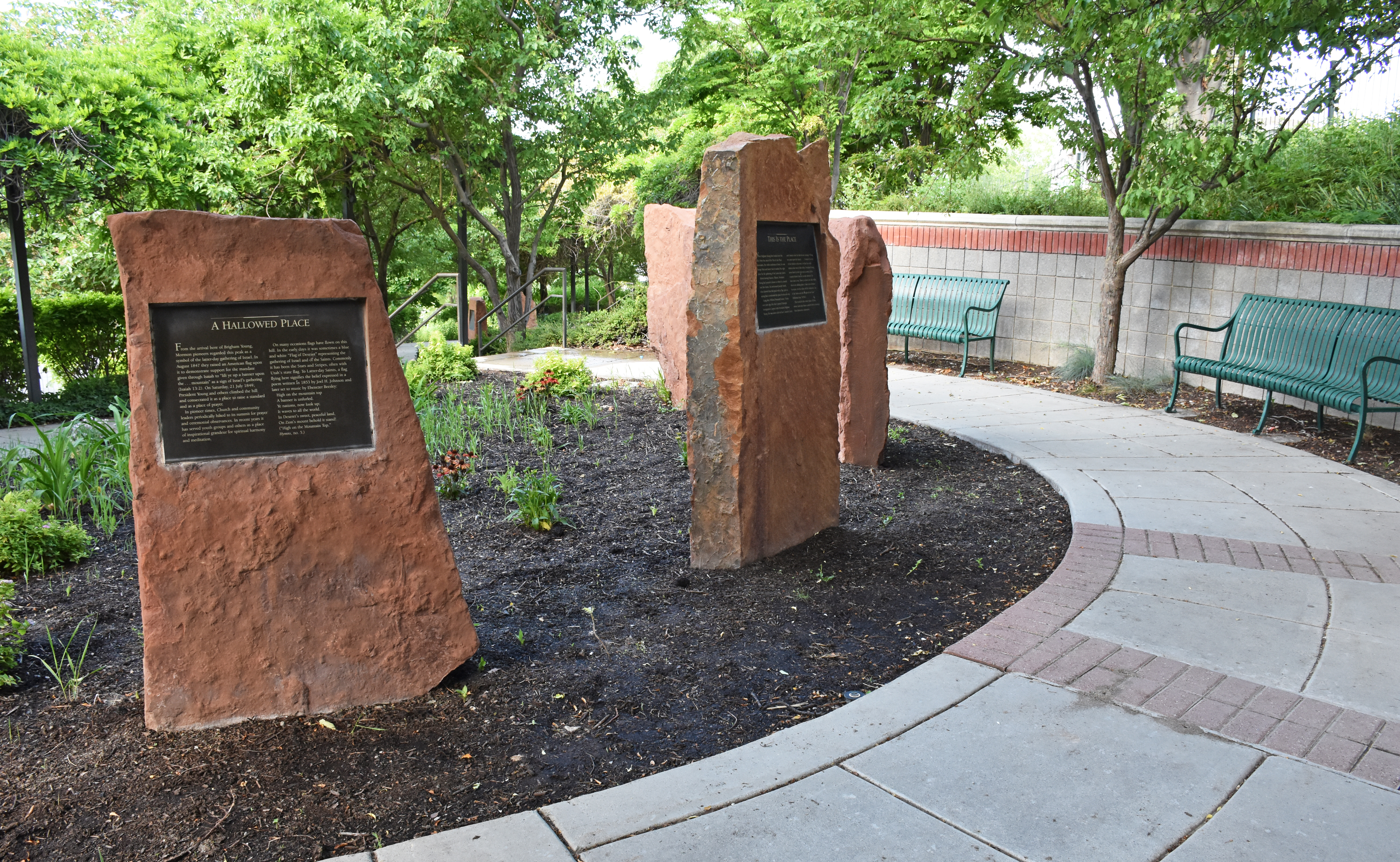
Ensign Peak Memorial Garden

On July 26, 1997, 150 years after the first climb by the pioneers, President Gordon B. Hinckley dedicated the Ensign Peak Memorial Garden. This garden, across the street from the entrance plaza to Ensign Peak Nature Park, was built on church-owned land, allowing for a telling of the spiritual history and scriptural significance of the peak.

== Other uses of the peak ==
=== Flaming "W" ===
For several decades in the 20th century, nearby West High School students would haul flammable materials to the side of the peak and ignite a large letter "W" for football games and graduation ceremonies. The Salt Lake City Fire Department ordered a stop to the practice in 1992, citing fire danger to new housing developments near the peak.

== See also ==
- Ensign Peak Foundation
- "High on the Mountain Top"
- This Is the Place Heritage Park
- First Encampment Park

== Bibliography ==
- Andersen, Rebecca K. (2019). "For the Strength of the Hills: Casting a Concrete Zion". In Rogers, Jedediah S.; Godfrey, Matthew (eds.). The Earth Will Appear as the Garden of Eden: Essays on Mormon Environmental History. Salt Lake City: University of Utah Press. ISBN 978-1607816546.
- Walker, Ronald W. (Winter 1993). "'A Banner is Unfurled': Mormonism's Ensign Peak" (PDF). Dialogue: A Journal of Mormon Thought. 26 (4).
- Walker, Ronald W. (Winter 1994). "A Gauge of the Times: Ensign Peak in the Twentieth Century". Utah Historical Quarterly. 62 (1).
