= KBRV =

- Soda Springs, Idaho; United States
- Frequency: 800 kHz
- Branding: "KBRV The Bear"

Programming
- Format: Classic Country

Ownership
- Owner: Val Cook; (Old West Media, Inc.)
- Sister stations: KNYN, KADQ-FM, KACH

History
- First air date: 1957 (at 540)
- Former frequencies: 540 kHz (1953–1967); 790 kHz (1967–2013)

Technical information
- Licensing authority: FCC
- Facility ID: 17437
- Class: D
- Power: 10,000 watts day 150 watts night
- Transmitter coordinates: 42°38′39″N 111°36′41″W
- Translators: K292AR 106.3 Soda Springs; K224EJ 92.7 Montpelier

Links
- Public license information: Public file; LMS
- Website: Official Website

KBRV (800 AM) is a radio station broadcasting a country music format. Licensed to Soda Springs, Idaho, United States, the station is currently owned by Val Cook, through licensee Old West Media, Inc. The station's main studios are in Evanston, Wyoming.

KBRV began broadcasting on 540 kHz in 1957. The station was owned by J.C. Wallentine, doing business as Caribou Broadcasting Company, and transmitting with 500 watts during the day. The transmitter for the station was half a mile south-southwest of Soda Springs. The studios were located at 88 West 2nd South in Soda Springs.

On June 2, 1967, after moving to 790, the power was upgraded to 5,000 watts. The station was sold in the 1970s to Baker Radio Group for $100,000 and was listed as a daytimer.

The station changed frequencies to 790 kHz in 1966 and moved again to 800 kHz around 2012. At the time, the station's transmitter on 790 had stopped working, and the station was already expecting delivery of a new transmitter, so a silent special temporary authority was applied for.

In 2001, Caribou Broadcasters sold the station.

In the early 2000s while at 790, the station carried a Contemporary Christian format simulcast with KRTK 1490 in Chubbuck, Idaho.

When the station was sold to Old West Media in 2015, the format flipped to classic country. It joins sister stations KNYN, and KADQ, both in Evanston, Wyoming. Owner Val Cook also owns KASL in Newcastle, Wyoming.
