= KPST =

KPST may refer to:

- KPST, an early call sign for the Idaho radio station KACH
- KPST, a call sign used 2009–2010 for KFFV, a TV station from Seattle, Washington
- KPST-TV, a call sign used 1986–2002 for KFSF-DT, a TV station from California
- KPST-FM, a radio station from California
- Katy Perry's Sweet Treats, a stuff pack for The Sims 3 video game
