= Murder of the Haight family =

2023 familicide in Utah, U.S.

Coordinates: 37.7679°N 113.0159°W

Killing of the Haight family
- Location: Enoch, Utah, U.S.
- Date: January 4, 2023; 3 years ago (MST)
- Attack type: Mass murder, mass shooting, familicide, murder-suicide
- Weapon: [[.40] Springfield XDM
- Deaths: 8 (including the perpetrator)
- Injuries: 0
- Perpetrator: Michael Haight
- Motive: Unknown

On January 4, 2023, a familicide occurred in Enoch, Utah, United States, when eight members of a single family, consisting of three adults and five children, were fatally shot in their home in a mass shooting. Authorities identified one of the adults, 42-year-old Michael Haight, as the perpetrator. Haight had been investigated by the Enoch Police Department for domestic abuse allegations in 2020. Two weeks prior to the killings, his wife had commenced divorce proceedings.

== Shooting ==
Police went to the family residence to conduct a welfare check at 4:00 p.m. on January 4 and found eight family members deceased from gunshot wounds. They were identified as 42-year-old Michael Haight, his wife Tausha Haight, 40; her mother Gail Earl, 78; and five children: Macie (17), Brilee (12), twins Ammon and Sienna (7), and Gavin (4). The welfare check had been requested by Tausha Haight’s therapist after she had missed their appointment earlier that afternoon.

The authorities determined that the perpetrator was Michael Haight, who died of a self-inflicted gunshot wound after fatally shooting his family members. Haight had been investigated by the Enoch Police Department for domestic abuse due to accusations made by his eldest daughter Macie in 2020. Macie reportedly told police that her father had "become assaultive" over the three previous years, that he had choked her, that she was afraid his attacks would worsen, and "very afraid that he was going to ... kill her". Michael told the investigating officer that his daughter, 14 at the time, was "mouthy". He told the investigating officer that he had surveyed his wife's phone and tablet to assure himself she hadn't spoken about the family in a negative way to anyone. Tausha Haight told the officer that she didn't believe filing charges was necessary and that she expected Michael would take this as a "wake-up call". The officer told Tausha there "was no indication that there would be any violent behavior on Michael's part". Asked about the domestic violence allegations after the killings, the County Attorney's office said it had found "insufficient evidence to pursue criminal charges". Tausha had commenced divorce proceedings against Michael two weeks prior to the shooting. Days before the shooting, Tausha had reportedly told her family that Michael had removed all guns from the family home.

== Aftermath ==
Family members of the victims released a statement shortly after the shooting in which they invited all to turn to God in the time of need, praised first responders efforts, and advocated against the use of the situation for political agendas claiming that all protective arms had previously been removed from the home earlier. The statement also stated that a GoFundMe had been created to help with funeral arrangements and other costs. The victims were buried in a single service in La Verkin City Cemetery on January 13, 2023. It was reported that Michael's name went unmentioned at the service and that he had a separate, private funeral held. After the funeral service, another statement was released by Tausha and Gail's family where they stated they have no ill will against the Haight family in the wake of the shooting.

An obituary of unknown origin praised Haight as a loving father. It was removed after the description sparked outrage. State and local governments offered their condolences in the wake of the shooting. Additionally, counselors and therapists offered their services and the local school district activated its mobile crisis response team to alert parents and offer support to students.

== See also ==
- List of mass shootings in the United States in 2023
