= Enoch, Utah =

City in Utah, United States

- City
- Location with Iron County and Utah
- Coordinates: 37°45′32″N 113°03′23″W
- Country: United States
- State: Utah
- County: Iron
- Founded: May 1851
- Incorporated: January 10, 1966
- Founder: Joel H. Johnson
- Named for: Enoch

Area
  - Total: 7.84 sq mi (20.31 km^{2})
  - Land: 7.84 sq mi (20.31 km^{2})
  - Water: 0 sq mi (0.00 km^{2})
- Elevation: 5,486 ft (1,672 m)

Population (2020)
  - Total: 7,374
  - Density: 940.4/sq mi (363.1/km^{2})
- Time zone: UTC-7 (Mountain (MST))
  - Summer (DST): UTC-6 (MDT)
- ZIP code: 84721
- Area code: 435
- FIPS code: 49-23200
- GNIS feature ID: 2410444
- Website: www.enochcityut.gov

Enoch is a city in Iron County, Utah, United States, and is located approximately 7 miles (11 km) northeast of Cedar City in the northeast part of Cedar Valley. The population was 7,374 at the 2020 census, up from 5,803 at the 2010 census. As of 2018, the estimated population was 7,039.

== History ==
Enoch was founded by Joel H. Johnson. It was originally known as Johnson's Springs and Fort Johnson.

Enoch was originally settled as part of an iron mission along with Cedar City and Parowan. The area was originally known as "Fort Johnson" and "Johnson Springs", after Joel H. Johnson, the earliest known white settler, who came to the area in 1851 with his family. In 1890, the area's name was changed to "Enoch", to avoid confusion with another settlement in Utah also named Johnson Springs. Enoch was officially incorporated on January 10, 1966, absorbing nearby Grimshawville, Stevensville, and Williamsville. The present name is after the Order of Enoch.

In June 2011, a new stake of the Church of Jesus Christ of Latter-day Saints was created. There are now the Enoch and Enoch West stakes. The dividing line is Minersville Highway.

In August 2021, the city sustained heavy flooding. The mayor of Enoch declared a state of emergency and the Red Cross set up a shelter to help citizens who were displaced by flooding in their homes. Iron County's emergency management coordinator reported that about 200 homes were damaged.

On January 4, 2023, a man shot and killed his wife, five children and mother-in-law before killing himself. His wife had recently filed for divorce.

== Geography ==
According to the United States Census Bureau, the city has a total area of 7.2 square miles (18.7 km^{2}), all land. Enoch is bordered to the south by Cedar City. Interstate 15 forms the southeastern border of Enoch, with access from Exit 62 to the south and Exit 71 to the northeast. I-15 leads north 245 miles (394 km) to Salt Lake City and southwest 175 miles (282 km) to Las Vegas.

=== Climate ===
The climate in this area has mild differences between highs and lows, and there is adequate rainfall year-round. According to the Köppen climate classification system, Enoch has a marine west coast climate, abbreviated "Cfb" on climate maps.

In 2021 Enoch experienced heavy flooding after a storm.

== Demographics ==
Historical population
Census	Pop.	Note	%±
1900	58		—
1910	67		15.5%
1920	165		146.3%
1930	161		−2.4%
1940	192		19.3%
1950	202		5.2%
1970	120		—
1980	678		465.0%
1990	1,947		187.2%
2000	3,467		78.1%
2010	5,803		67.4%
2020	7,374		27.1%
U.S. Decennial Census

=== 2020 census ===
As of the 2020 census, Enoch had a population of 7,374. The median age was 29.1 years. 36.5% of residents were under the age of 18 and 11.0% of residents were 65 years of age or older. For every 100 females there were 97.6 males, and for every 100 females age 18 and over there were 95.5 males age 18 and over.

88.4% of residents lived in urban areas, while 11.6% lived in rural areas.

There were 2,028 households in Enoch, of which 50.3% had children under the age of 18 living in them. Of all households, 74.3% were married-couple households, 9.7% were households with a male householder and no spouse or partner present, and 13.7% were households with a female householder and no spouse or partner present. About 11.8% of all households were made up of individuals and 5.5% had someone living alone who was 65 years of age or older.

There were 2,111 housing units, of which 3.9% were vacant. The homeowner vacancy rate was 1.1% and the rental vacancy rate was 4.8%.

Racial composition as of the 2020 census
Race	Number	Percent
White	6,548	88.8%
Black or African American	16	0.2%
American Indian and Alaska Native	115	1.6%
Asian	13	0.2%
Native Hawaiian and Other Pacific Islander	8	0.1%
Some other race	210	2.8%
Two or more races	464	6.3%
Hispanic or Latino (of any race)	524	7.1%

=== 2000 census ===
As of the census of 2000, there were 3,467 people, 958 households, and 858 families residing in the city. The population density was 1,047.1 people per square mile (404.4/km^{2}). There were 1,029 housing units at an average density of 310.8 per square mile (120.0/km^{2}). The racial makeup of the city was 94.78% White, 0.17% African American, 2.45% Native American, 0.26% Asian, 0.40% Pacific Islander, 1.07% from other races, and 0.87% from two or more races. Hispanic or Latino of any race were 2.54% of the population.

There were 958 households, out of which 59.0% had children under 18 living with them, 79.6% were married couples living together, 7.8% had a female householder with no husband present, and 10.4% were non-families. 8.8% of all households were made up of individuals, and 2.1% had someone living alone who was 65 years of age or older. The average household size was 3.62, and the average family size was 3.86.

In the city, the population was spread out, with 41.2% under 18, 11.3% from 18 to 24, 28.2% from 25 to 44, 15.4% from 45 to 64, and 3.9% who were 65 years of age or older. The median age was 24 years. For every 100 females, there were 97.2 males. For every 100 females aged 18 and over, there were 95.4 males.

The median income for a household in the city was $37,368, and the median income for a family was $38,085. Males had a median income of $30,215 versus $19,688 for females. The per capita income was $11,424. About 7.2% of families and 8.9% of the population were below the poverty line, including 12.1% of those under age 18 and 10.0% of those aged 65 or over.

== Government ==
The current city council consists of Mayor Geoffrey Chesnut, with council members David Harris, Richard Jensen, Dave Owens, Katherine Ross, and Shawn Stoor.

The city is organized under a six-member council system of government where the mayor is a non-voting (except in the case of a tie) member. The mayor is charged with the executive duties of the city. Currently, the city has employed a City Manager (Robert Dotson) to handle the day-to-day administration of the city.

== Notable people ==
- Texas Rose Bascom (1922–1993), rodeo trick rider, Hollywood actress, hall of fame inductee
- Joel Hills Johnson (1802–1882), inventor, Mormon pioneer, Utah politician, founded the town of Enoch

== See also ==
- List of cities and towns in Utah
