= Johnson, Utah =

Ghost town in Kane County, Utah

Coordinates: 37°05′11″N 112°22′31″W

Johnson is a ghost town in Kane County, in the U.S. state of Utah. It is located 12 miles east of the present-day city of Kanab, Utah.

== History ==
Johnson was founded in 1871 by the four Johnson brothers: Joel, Joseph, Benjamin, and William, and named for them. A post office called Johnson was established in 1871, and remained in operation until 1937.

== Notable people ==
- Joel Hills Johnson (1802-1882) - inventor, Mormon pioneer, missionary, published poet and gospel hymn composer, politician, judge, one of the founders of the town of Johnson

== See also ==
- List of ghost towns in Utah
