= History of Salt Lake City =

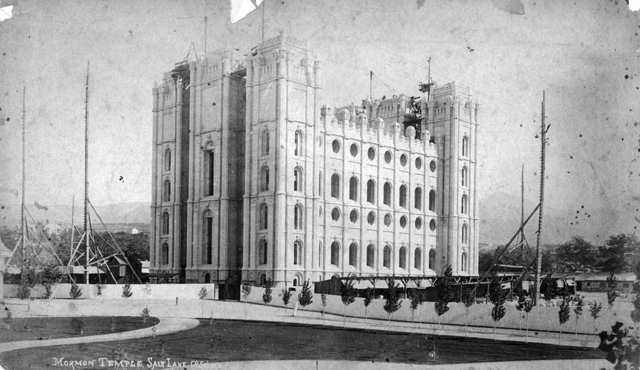
Salt Lake City Temple under construction

Originally, the Salt Lake Valley was inhabited by the Shoshone, Paiute, Goshute and Ute Native American tribes. At the time of the founding of Salt Lake City the valley was within the territory of the Northwestern Shoshone, who had their seasonal camps along streams within the valley and in adjacent valleys. One of the local Shoshone tribes, the Western Goshute tribe, referred to the Great Salt Lake as Pi'a-pa, meaning "big water", or Ti'tsa-pa, meaning "bad water". The land was treated by the United States as public domain; no aboriginal title by the Northwestern Shoshone was ever recognized by the United States or extinguished by treaty with the United States. Father Silvestre Vélez de Escalante, a Spanish Franciscan missionary is considered the first European explorer in the area in 1776, but only came as far north as Utah valley (Provo), some 60 miles south of the Salt Lake City area. The first US visitor to see the Salt Lake area was Jim Bridger in 1824. U.S. Army officer John C. Frémont surveyed the Great Salt Lake and the Salt Lake Valley in 1843 and 1845. The Donner Party, a group of ill-fated pioneers, traveled through the Great Salt Lake Valley a year before the Mormon pioneers. This group had spent weeks traversing difficult terrain and brush, cutting a road through the Wasatch Mountains, coming through Emigration canyon into the Salt Lake Valley on August 12, 1846. This same path would be used by the vanguard company of Mormon pioneers, and for many years after that by those following them to Salt Lake.

== Early years ==
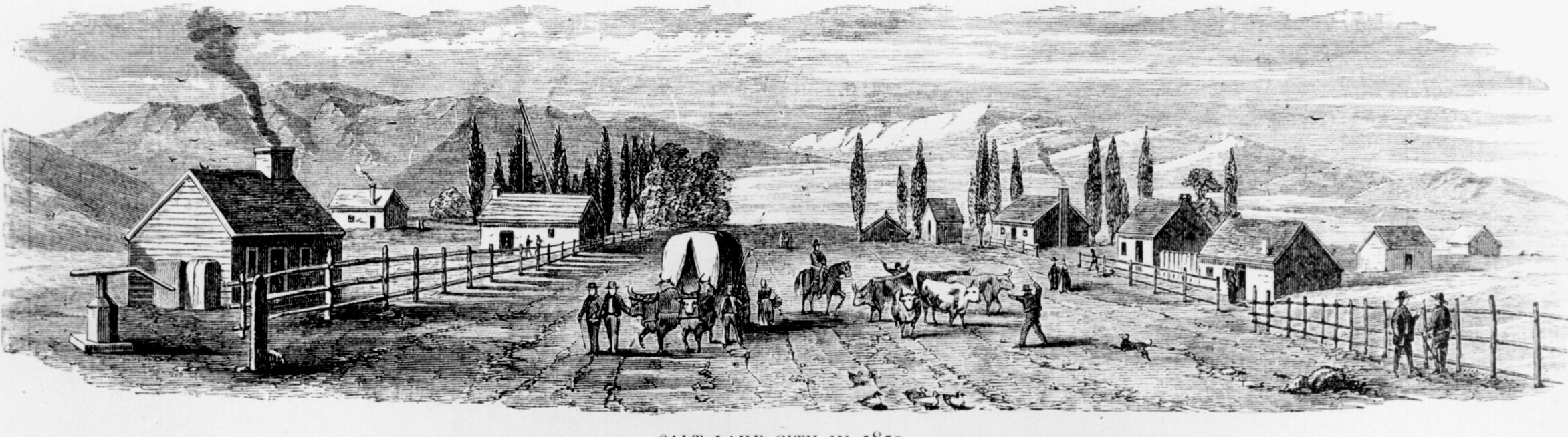
Salt Lake City in 1850.

On July 24, 1847, 143 men, three women and two children founded Great Salt Lake City several miles to the east of the Great Salt Lake, nestled in the northernmost reaches of the Salt Lake Valley. The first two in this company to enter the Salt Lake valley were Orson Pratt and Erastus Snow. These members of the Church of Jesus Christ of Latter-day Saints ("LDS Church") sought to establish an autonomous religious community and were the first people of European descent to permanently settle in the area now known as Utah. Thousands of Mormon pioneers would arrive in Salt Lake in the coming months and years.

Brigham Young led the Saints west after the death of Joseph Smith. Upon arrival to the Salt Lake valley, Young had a vision by saying, "It is enough. This is the right place. Drive on." (This is commonly shortened to, "This is the place"). There is a state park in Salt Lake City known as This Is The Place Heritage Park commemorating the spot where Young made the famous statement.

Settlers buried thirty-six Native Americans in one grave after an outbreak of measles occurred during the winter of 1847.

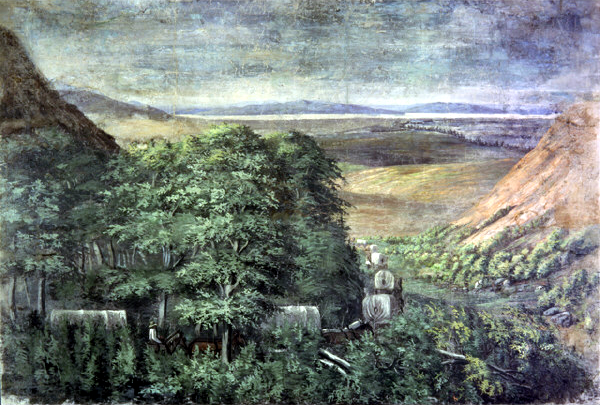
Mormon pioneers entering the Great Salt Lake valley

Salt Lake City was originally settled by Latter-day Saint Pioneers to be the New Zion according to church President and leader Brigham Young. Young originally governed both the territory and church by a High council which enacted the original municipal orders in 1848. This system was later replaced with a city council and mayor style government.

After a very difficult winter and a miraculous crop retrieval, in which Pioneers reported to have been saved from cricket infestation by seagulls (see Miracle of the Gulls), the "Desert Blossomed as the Rose" in the Salt Lake Valley. Early Pioneers survived by maintaining a very tight-knit community. Under Young's leadership Pioneers worked out a system of communal crop sharing within the various ward houses established throughout the Salt Lake Valley.

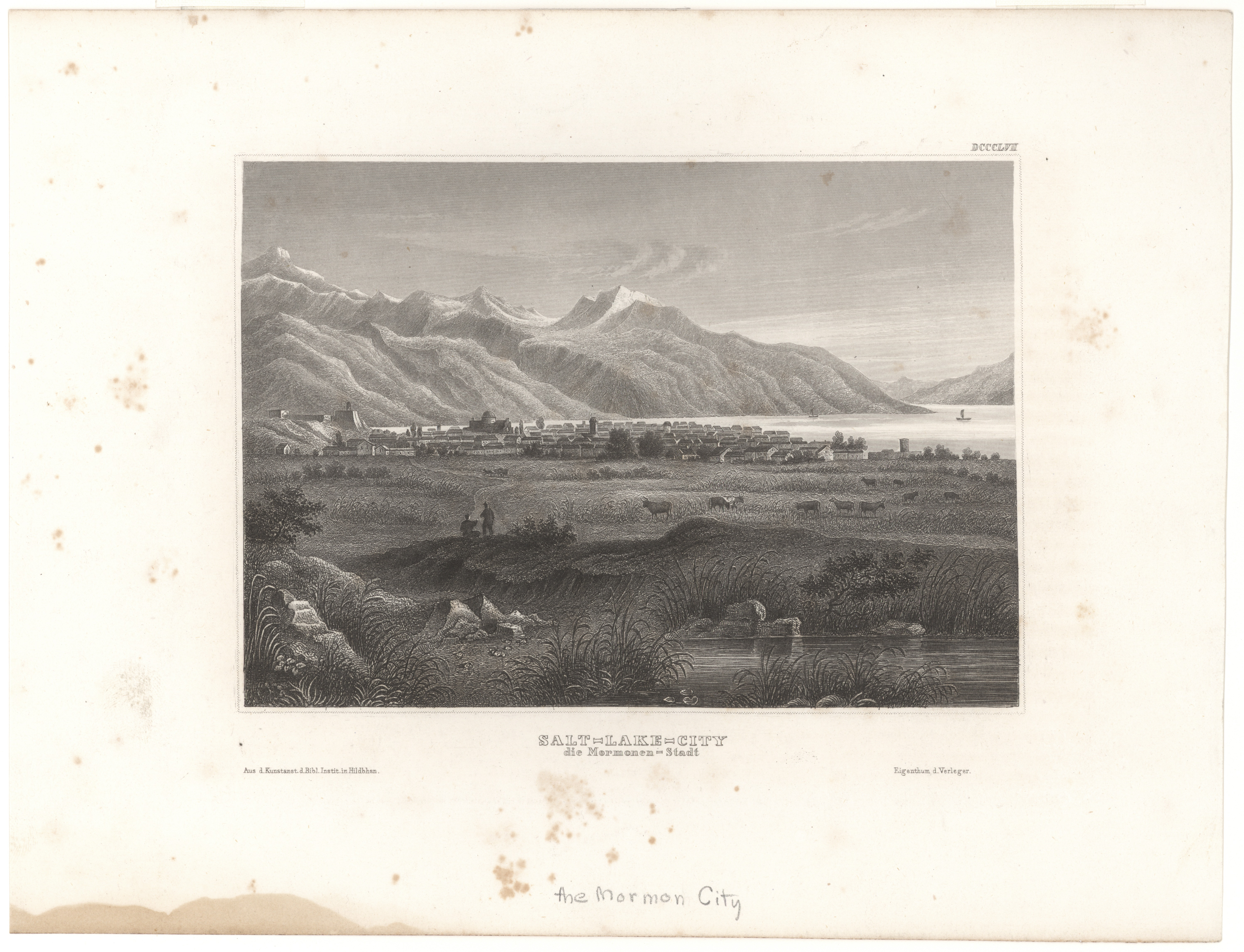
Salt Lake City, c. 1853

The California Gold Rush brought many people through the city on their way to seek fortunes. Salt Lake, which was at the cross-roads of the westward trek, became a vital trading point for speculators and prospectors traveling through. They came with goods from the East, such as clothing and other manufactured items, trading with the local farmers for fresh livestock and crops.

Congress organized Utah Territory out of the "State of Deseret" in 1850. A few months later on January 9, 1851, "an ordinance having been passed by the General Assembly of the State of Deseret" formally incorporated the municipality as "Great Salt Lake City." Originally, Fillmore, Utah was the territorial capital, but in 1856 it was moved to Salt Lake City, where it has stayed ever since.

In 1855 Congress directed the President of the United States to appoint a surveyor general for Utah Territory, and to cause that the lands of that territory should be surveyed preparatory to bringing them on the market. Certain sections were to be reserved for the benefit of schools and a university in the territory. The surveyor general arrived in Utah in July of the same year to begin surveying. He established the initial point for his survey (base line and meridian) at the southeast corner of the Temple Block, and from there extended that survey over 2 million acres. Because of numerous conflicts between the surveyor and the territorial government the first surveyor general abandoned his post in 1857. His successors recommended that no additional land be surveyed. Conflict between the federal and territorial governments kept the issue on hold until 1868, and in the meantime, large sections of the territory were transferred to neighboring territories and states. Again in 1868, Congress directed the President to appoint a surveyor general in the Utah Territory, to establish a land office in Salt Lake City, and to extend the federal land laws over the same. The land office opened 9 March 1869.

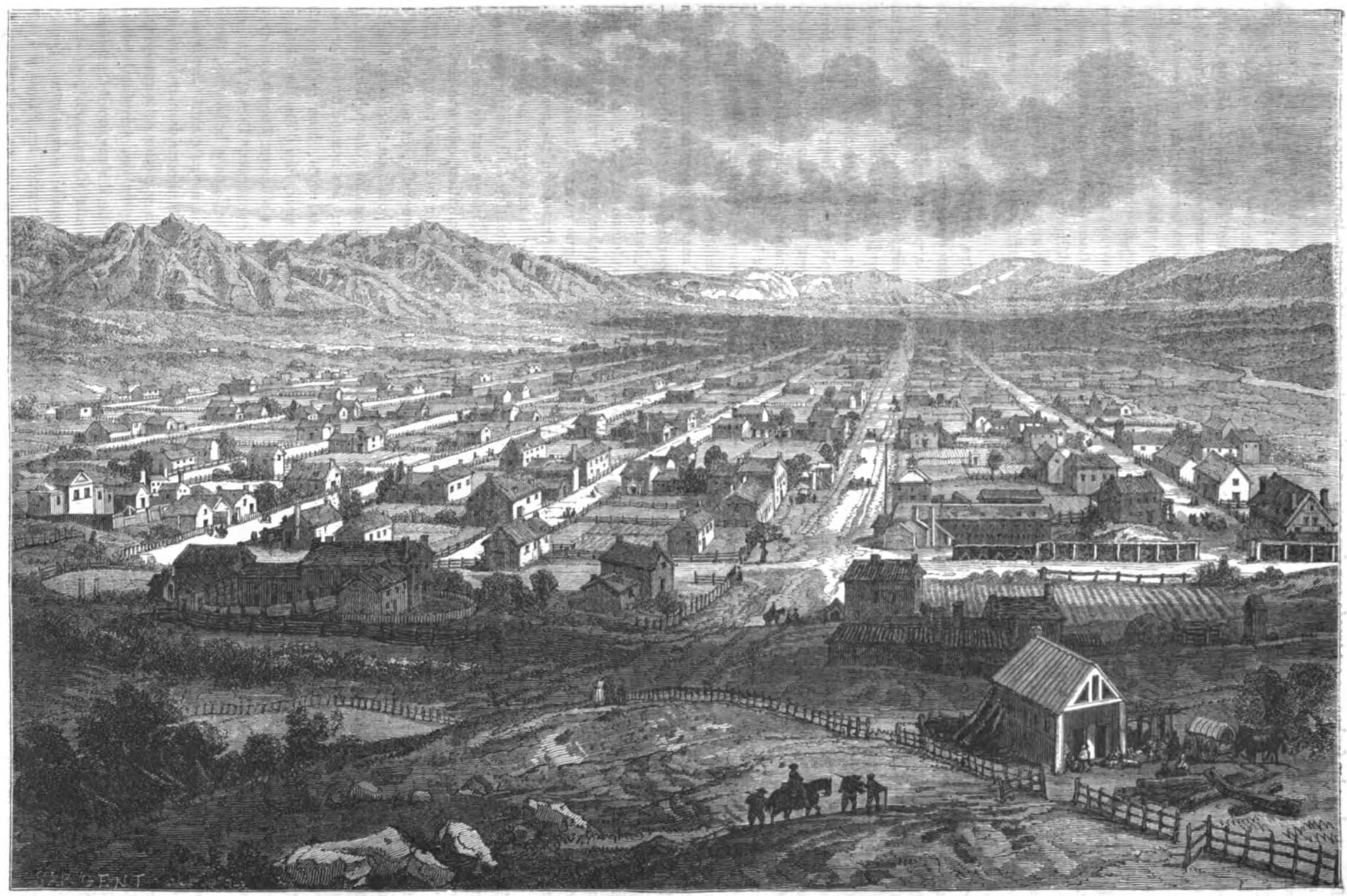
Salt Lake City in 1862

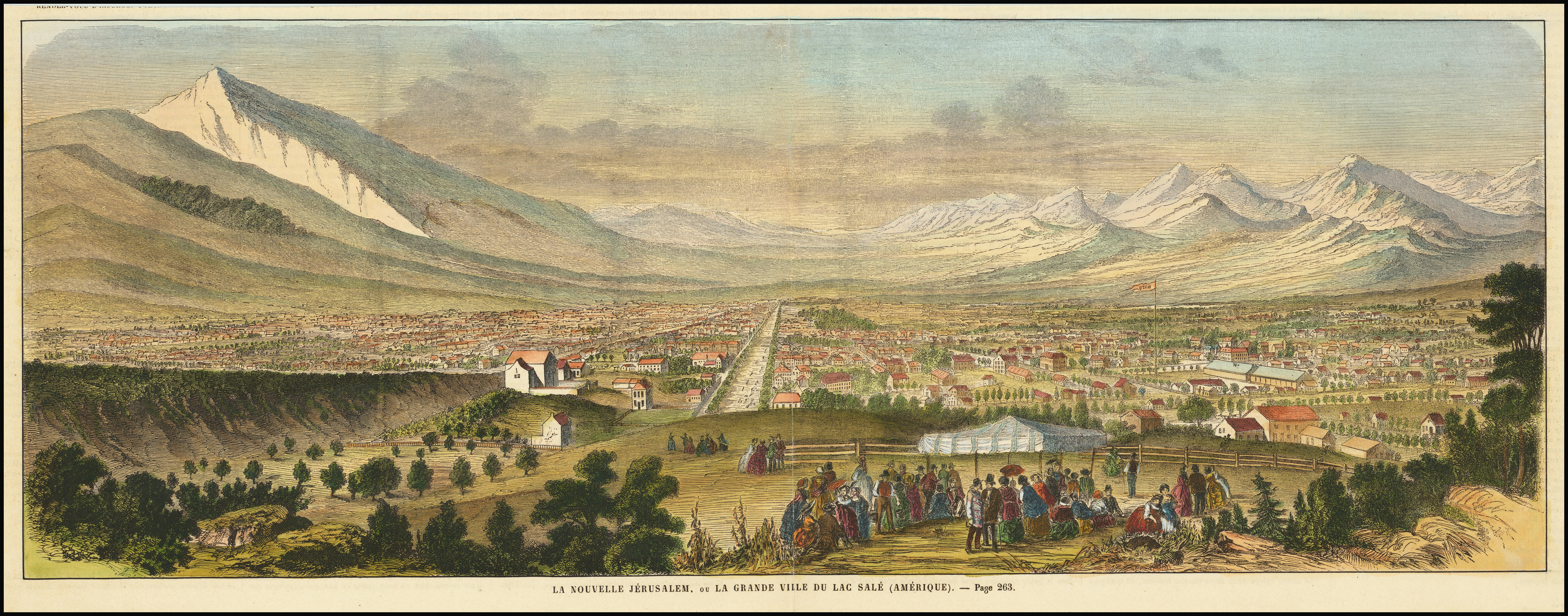
Salt Lake City in 1863

In 1857, when the Mormon practice of polygamy came to national awareness, President James Buchanan responded to public outcry by sending an army of 2500 soldiers, called the Utah Expedition, to investigate the LDS Church and install a non-LDS governor to replace Brigham Young. In response, Brigham Young imposed martial law, sending the Utah militia to harass the soldiers, a conflict called the Utah War. Young eventually surrendered to federal control when the new territorial governor, Alfred Cumming, arrived in Salt Lake City on April 12, 1858. Most troops pulled out at the beginning of the American Civil War.

In order to secure the road to California during the Civil War, more troops arrived under the command of Colonel Patrick Edward Connor in 1862. They settled in the Fort Douglas area east of the city. Thoroughly anti-LDS, Connor viewed the people with disdain, calling them, "a community of traitors, murderers, fanatics, and whores." To dilute their influence he worked with non-LDS business and bank owners, and also encouraged mining. In 1863 some of his troops discovered rich veins of gold and silver in the Wasatch Mountains.

In 1866, Thomas Coleman, a Black Mormon man, was murdered, and his body was left on Capitol Hill with an anti-miscegenation warning attached to his body. In 1883, Sam Joe Harvey, another Black man, was lynched for allegedly shooting a police officer, and his body was dragged down State Street.

In 1868 Brigham Young founded the Zion's Co-operative Mercantile Institution (ZCMI) as a way to ward off dependency on outside goods and arguably to hinder ex-LDS retailers. Although ZCMI is sometimes credited with being the nation's first department store, a decade earlier New York City's "Marble Palace" and Macy's vied for that title.

Change was inevitable. The world started to come to Salt Lake City in 1869 with the completion of the First Transcontinental Railroad in the United States at Promontory Summit, north of the city. By 1870, Salt Lake had been linked to it via the Utah Central Rail Road. People began to pour into Salt Lake seeking opportunities in mining and other industries.

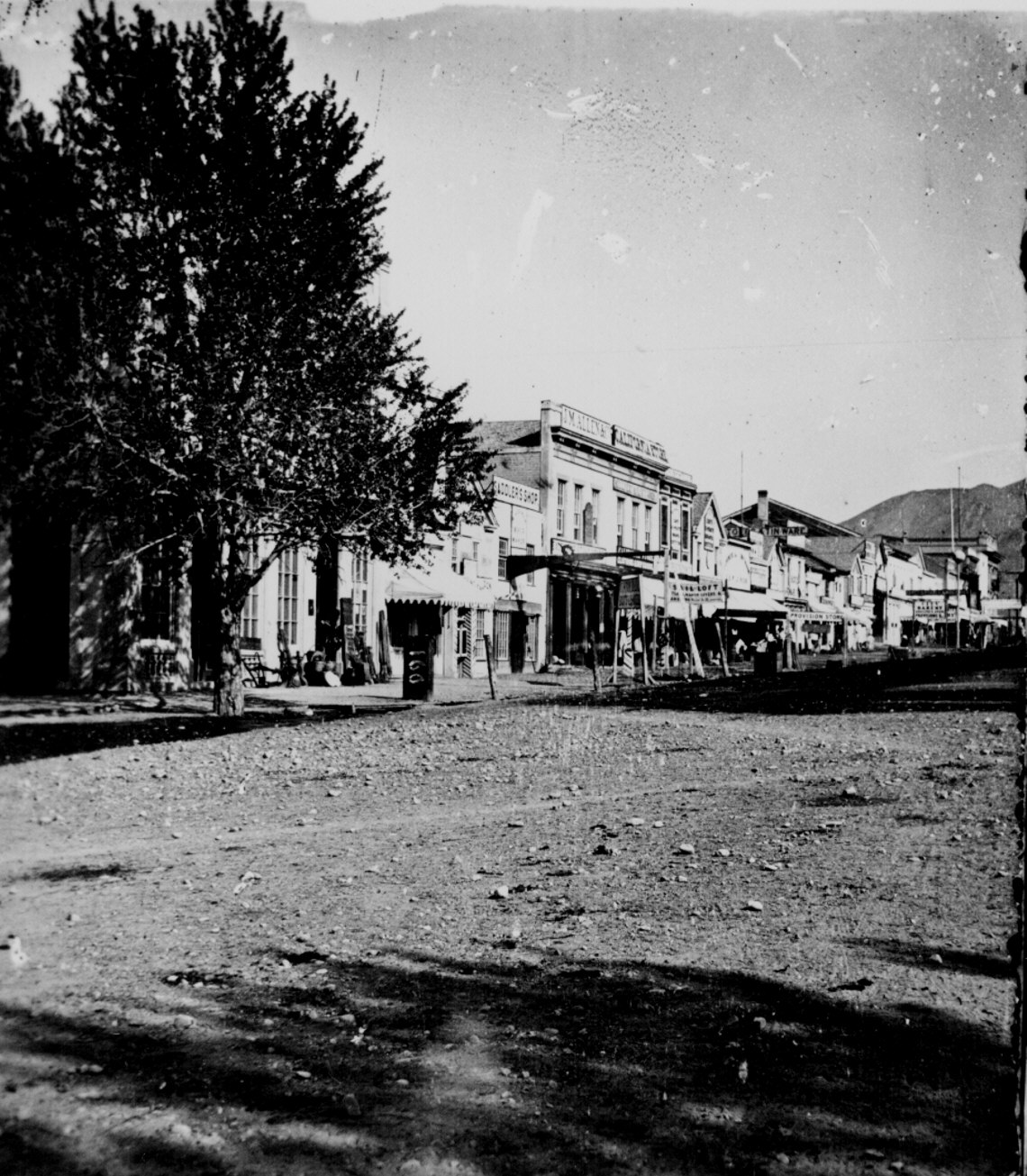
Street view, Salt Lake City, 1869

City government was dominated by the People's Party until 1890. The non-national People's Party was an LDS-controlled political organization, and each of the early mayors of Salt Lake City was LDS. Sparks often flew between LDS city government and non-LDS federal authorities stationed just outside Salt Lake. A dramatic example occurred in 1874 when city police were arrested by US Marshals, who took control of the national election being held in Salt Lake City. Mayor Daniel H. Wells, a member of the LDS Church First Presidency, declared martial law from the balcony of the Old Salt Lake City Hall. Federal troops arrested the mayor, but he was soon released.

In the 1880s, the anti-polygamy Edmunds-Tucker Act systematically denied many prominent LDS Church members the right to vote or hold office. Polygamists were detained in a Federal prison just outside Salt Lake in the Sugar House area. Consequentially, the non-LDS Liberal Party took control of City government in the 1890 election. Three years later the Liberal Party and People's Party dissolved into national parties anticipating Utah statehood, but both LDS and non-LDS leaders would govern Salt Lake City from that point onward.

The city became Utah's state capital on January 4, 1896, when Utah entered the union upon President Grover Cleveland's decree after the LDS Church agreed to ban polygamy in 1890.

== The 20th Century ==
In 1907, Salt Lake City was home to Industrial Workers of the World Industrial Union No. 202.

The city adopted a non-partisan city council in 1911. As LDS/non-LDS tensions eased people began to work together for the common good, improving roads, utilities and public healthcare.

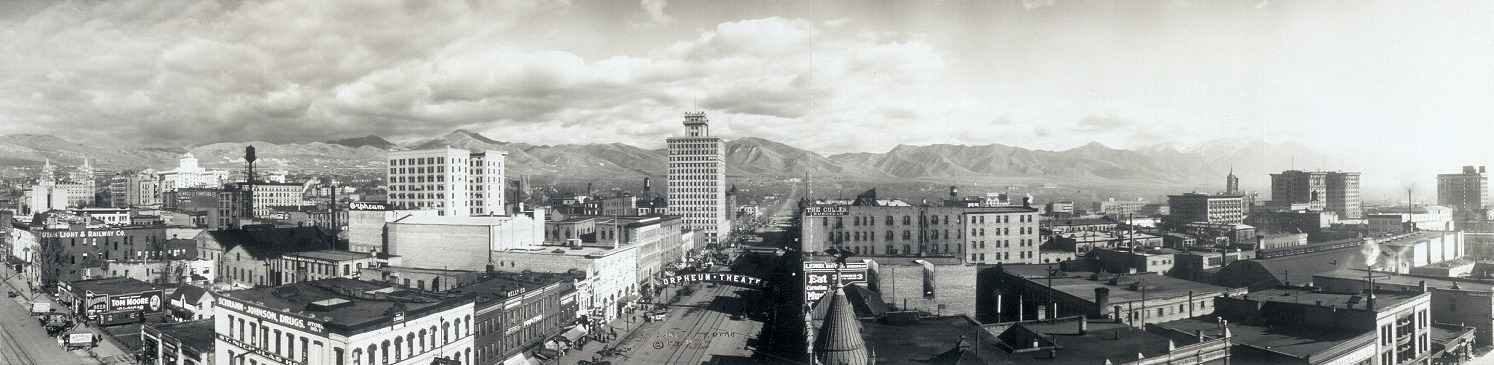
Downtown Salt Lake City circa 1913

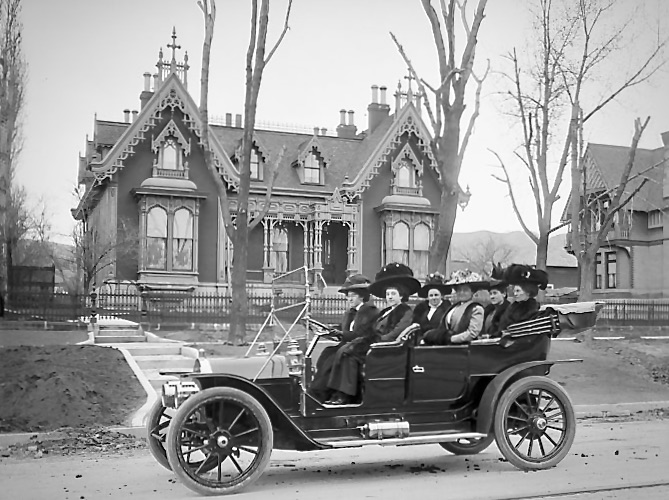
Salt Lake City suburb, 1909

Armed delivery of liquor & beer, 1917

The Great Depression hit Salt Lake City especially hard. At its peak, the unemployment rate reached 61,500 people, about 36%. The annual per capita income in 1932 was $276, half of what it was in 1929, $537 annually. Jobs were scarce. Although boosted by federal New Deal programs as well as The Church of Jesus Christ of Latter-day Saints, the economy did not fully recover until World War II.

After suffering through the depression Salt Lake's economy was boosted during World War II due to the influx of defense industries to the Wasatch Front. Demands for raw materials increased Utah's mining industry, and several military installations such as Fort Douglas and Hill Air Force Base were added.

After the Second World War, Salt Lake City grew rapidly. It began to suffer some of the same problems other cities face. Urban sprawl became a growing problem due to a combination of rapid growth and an abundance of available land. Military and aerospace also became dominant industries.

Salt Lake began its bid for the Winter Olympics as early as the 1930s, when the Utah Ski Club tried to bring the games to the valley. At the time, however, the Summer Olympic host city had the option of hosting the winter games, and all attempts failed. Salt Lake tried again throughout the decades until 1995, when the International Olympic Committee announced Salt Lake City as the site of the 2002 Winter Olympics.

After 132 years in business, ZCMI was sold to the May Department Stores Company in 1999. Remaining ZCMI stores, including one in downtown Salt Lake City, were converted into Meier & Frank stores, although the historic facade still reads "1868 ZCMI 1999".

In April 1999, the Salt Lake City council voted 5 to 2 along LDS membership lines to sell to the LDS Church the segment of Main Street that lay between Temple Square and the LDS Church office buildings for $8.1 million. The Church planned to build a large plaza on the land as well as a parking structure below. There was much public outcry about the sale of public lands to a private organization, but a Church representative assured residents that the plaza would be a "little bit of Paris", a characterization that would be used against the LDS Church later. Concerns also lay in plans to ban such activities as demonstrations, skateboarding, sunbathing, smoking, and other activities it considered "vulgar". The Utah ACLU believed that these restrictions were incompatible with the pedestrian easement that the city retained over the plaza. ACLU attorneys claimed this made the plaza into a public free speech forum. Nonetheless, the property was sold to become the Main Street Plaza. After the Utah District Court ruled against the ACLU, they were vindicated by the 10th Circuit Court in the Fall of 2002. Scrambling to satisfy residents, Rocky Anderson offered a plan for "time and place" restrictions on speech as suggested by the court. However, the LDS Church held firm to get the easement rescinded. Although The Salt Lake Tribune backed the mayor's initial plan, the city council disliked it. In its place, Anderson offered to waive the easement in exchange for west side property from the LDS Church to build a community and a commitment of donations for it. All parties agreed to the arrangement, and the Main Street Plaza is now wholly owned by the LDS Church. Some suppose Anderson's compromise was an effort to strengthen his 2003 re-election campaign among Latter-day Saints and west side residents. Both groups tended to have less favorable impressions of the former mayor.

== Today ==
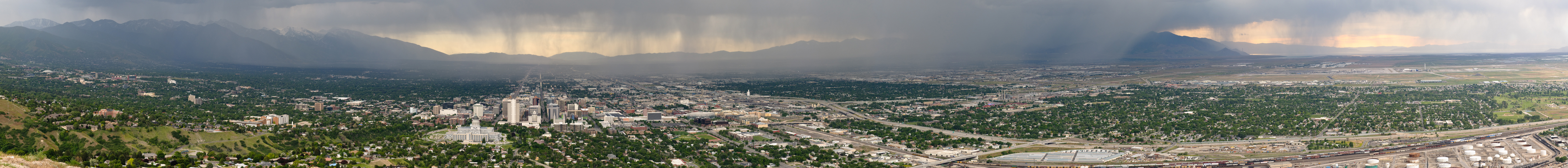
A panoramic view of Salt Lake City's East Bench, June 2009.

=== 2002 Winter Olympics and their legacy ===
Much change occurred in the Wasatch Front due to the 2002 Winter Olympics. Scandal rocked the city when it was discovered that millions of dollars had been funneled into bribes to International Olympic Committee members.

==== The Games ====
The games opened with the 1980 US hockey team lighting the torch and President George W. Bush officially opening the games at the Rice-Eccles Stadium set designed by Seven Nielsen. Closing ceremonies were also held at that venue.

Controversy erupted when in the first week the pairs figure skating competition resulted in the French judge's scores being thrown out and the Canadian team of Jamie Salé and David Pelletier being awarded a second gold medal. Athletes in short-track speed skating and cross-country skiing were disqualified for various reasons as well (including doping), leading Russia and South Korea to file protests and threaten to withdraw from competition.

Heightened fear of terrorism following the September 11 attacks turned out to be unfounded, and the games proved safe.

The 2002 games ended with a dazzling closing ceremony, including bands such as Bon Jovi and Kiss (who shared the stage with figure skater Katarina Witt).

Most of the 2,500 athletes paraded into Rice-Eccles Stadium, watching from the stands. Bobsledding bronze medalist Brian Shimer carried the American flag. Russia and South Korean both threatened to boycott the ceremony to protest what they felt was unfair judging, but showed up anyway.

==== Legacy ====
Many improvements were made to the area's infrastructure. $1.59 billion were spent on highway improvements, including improvements of Interstate 15 through the city and new interchanges near Park City. A light rail system was constructed from downtown to the suburb of Sandy and later to the University of Utah.

The Athlete's Village is now student housing at the University of Utah. Many venues in and around the city still stand even after the games.

Many hotels, motels and restaurants were built for the games and still exist today.

== Future ==
Salt Lake City still somewhat struggles with its identity, trying to strike a balance between capitol of a major religion and modern secular metropolis. While founded by Mormons, the city is increasingly dominated by non-members, with its LDS population falling steeply and steadily since the 1990s. Considerable changes are being made to alter the downtown in adjustment to the phenomenal growth of the area. In the early 2010s, the LDS Church purchased the Crossroads and ZCMI malls and rebuilt them into the City Creek Center, which is connected by walkways, and with new high density residential and commercial buildings nearby. The commuter rail FrontRunner is in place along the northern Wasatch Front, with extensions planned for the southern portion of the region. Light rail extensions to the Trax system are ongoing to provide service to the western and southern parts of the valley, as well as to Salt Lake City International Airport. The controversial Legacy Highway has one segment completed (the Legacy Parkway), with the construction of the early phase of the next segment (the Mountain View Corridor) completed through the west side of the Salt Lake Valley.

== See also ==
- Dolly Dimples (Utah)
- No-Ni-Shee Arch
