= High on the Mountain Top =

1850s Latter Day Saint hymn

- Hymn
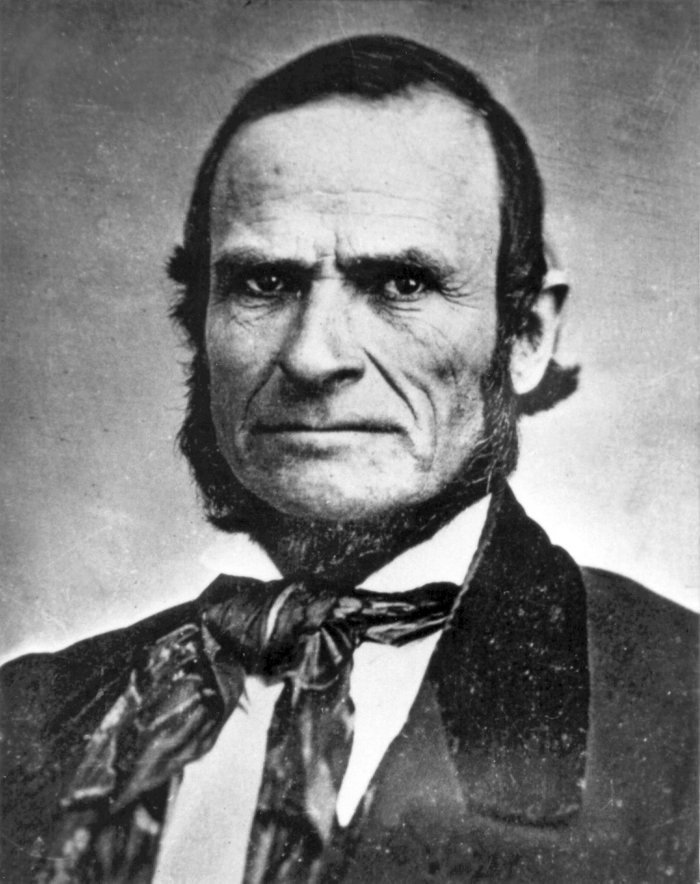
- The text writer of the Latter Day Saint hymn
- Written: 1853
- Text: by Joel H. Johnson
- Meter: 6 6 6 6 8 8
- Melody: "Deseret" by Ebenezer Beesley
- Composed: 1854

"High on the Mountain Top" is an 1850s hymn written by Latter Day Saint hymn writers Joel H. Johnson and Ebenezer Beesley. Originally named "Deseret", it is hymn number 5 in the current LDS Church hymnal.

The lyrics to the hymn were written by Johnson in 1853, five years after Brigham Young preached on Ensign Peak as the Mormon pioneers first arrived in the Salt Lake Valley. Even though Johnson's journal contains more than 700 hymns, "High on the Mountain Top" is his most notable contribution to LDS music.

In 1854, Beesley composed music to accompany Johnson's poem. The Mormon Tabernacle Choir adopted Beesley's rendition and it has since become one of the choir's standard numbers.

The hymn has four verses and centers on the theme that God has restored the gospel to the earth.

== Lyrics ==
High on the mountain top
A banner is unfurled.
Ye nations, now look up;
It waves to all the world.
In Deseret's sweet, peaceful land,
On Zion's mount behold it stand!

For God remembers still
His promise made of old
That he on Zion's hill
Truth's standard would unfold!
Her light should there attract the gaze
Of all the world in latter days.

His house shall there be reared,
His glory to display,
And people shall be heard
In distant lands to say:
We'll now go up and serve the Lord,
Obey his truth and learn his word.

For there we shall be taught
The law that will go forth,
With truth and wisdom fraught,
To govern all the earth.
Forever there his ways we'll tread,
And save ourselves with all our dead.
