= Joel H. Johnson =

American politician

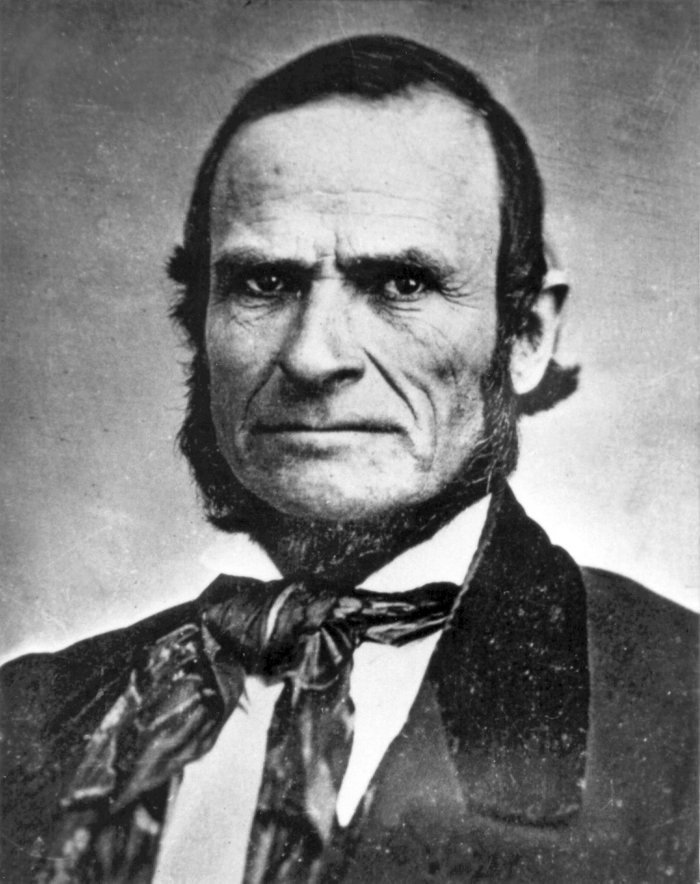

Personal details
- Born: March 23, 1802; Grafton, Massachusetts, United States
- Died: September 24, 1882 (aged 80); Kane County, Utah Territory, United States
- Resting place: Johnson Cemetery; 37.4569°N 112.4496°W
- Occupation: Hymn Writer
- Spouse(s): Anna Pixley; Susan Bryant; Lucina Alzina Bascom; Janet Fife; Margaret Threlkeld

Joel Hills Johnson (March 23, 1802 – September 24, 1882) was a Latter-day Saint missionary and hymn writer, known for being the author of "High on the Mountain Top" (hymn no. 5 in the 1985 LDS hymnbook, English edition). Johnson was also the founder of Enoch, Utah, and the founder of the ghosttown Johnson, Utah.

== Early life ==
Johnson was born in Grafton, Massachusetts. His parents were Ezekiel Johnson and Julia Hills. When Johnson was still a child, his family moved to Vermont. Johnson eventually moved to Cincinnati and then back east to Pomfret, New York.

== Latter-day Saints ==
Around the year 1830, Johnson sold his farm in Pomfret and moved to Amherst, Ohio. It was in Amherst where Johnson was baptized a member of the Church of Christ on June 1, 1831. Soon afterwards, he became president of the church's Amherst branch. He went on a mission to New York in 1832.

=== Kirtland and Ramus ===
In 1833, Johnson moved to Kirtland, Ohio, where he operated a saw mill. He went on another mission to both Ohio and Kentucky in 1835 during which he engaged in strong debates with Campbellites, on one occasion turning their rejection of Aaronic and Melchezidek priesthood on its head by insisting if not in either of these orders their leaders must be of the order of the priests of Baal. and often preached and baptized in the vicinity of Kirtland. Johnson was an organizer of the Kirtland Camp in 1838. He stopped at Springfield, Illinois, and did not continue to Missouri, thus avoiding the Mormon War of 1838. He organized a branch in Springfield and became the first Latter Day Saint to preach in Carthage, Illinois. The main reason that Johnson had stopped in Illinois and not continued west was that he had care of the sick coming from Kirtland. He energetically preached the gospel in Carthage and felt he won many people in that area to be friendly to the Mormons cause.

Johnson later had a large amount of success in baptizing families that lived along Crooked Creek. In April 1839 he organized these converts as the Crooked Creek Branch. After this, Johnson directed his new converts in the forming of the town of Ramus (now Webster, Illinois). In February 1840 Johnson moved to the area, where he purchased a sawmill. The Ramus Stake was organized on July 4, 1840, with Johnson as president. After this the stake under Johnson's direction set about laying out a town site.

In 1846, mobs forced Johnson to flee Ramus and move to Knox County, Illinois. He later joined the Saints at Winter Quarters, Nebraska.

=== Book of Mormon ===
A poem written in 1841 by Johnson is sometimes used by opponents of the authenticity of the Book of Mormon to demonstrate that Oliver Cowdery at times wavered in his testimony as one of the Three Witnesses of the Book of Mormon: "... Or prove the gospel was not true / Because old Paul the Saints could kill? / Because the Jews its author slew, / and now reject their Saviour still? … / Or Book of Mormon not his word / because denied by Oliver?"

Defenders of Cowdery argue that to Johnson, supporting the Book of Mormon and following the leaders of the church were one and the same, and that in 1841 Cowdery had been excommunicated from the church. They also note that the use of "denied" in the poem may mean to set aside, and not to speak against, and that this poem involves many statements that are not strictly true, such as that Paul had killed Christians. In other words, it is argued that poetry should not be taken as analytical evidence when it has not been collaborated.

=== Salt Lake City ===
Johnson arrived in Salt Lake City on October 11, 1848. He crossed the plains in Willard Richards' company. He served as a justice of the peace and as bishop of the Mill Creek Ward. Johnson built a saw mill in Mill Creek Ward from 1849 to 1851 at the mouth of Mill Creek Canyon.

In 1849 and 1850, Johnson served in the Utah Territorial Legislature.

=== Enoch, Utah ===
Johnson was the founder of Enoch, Utah, settling there in 1851. When other settlers arrived in 1854, they built a fort which they named "Johnson's Fort". Before it became Enoch it was named Elk Horn Springs.

Johnson later helped settle southern Utah. In 1853, he was appointed to serve as a missionary among the Piedes of Iron County, Utah.

== Poetry and hymns ==
Johnson was a prolific poet and hymn writer. His journal contains 736 hymns. Collections of his writings were published in the pamphlet "Voice from the Mountains" in 1881 and a 344-page book of poems in 1882. His most sung hymn, "High on the Mountain Top", was written on February 19, 1853. Other estimates place Johnson's total work in writing hymn texts and poems at about 1,000. The only other hymn by Johnson in the current English edition of the LDS Church hymnal is "The Glorious Gospel Light Has Shone" (no. 283).

== Personal life ==
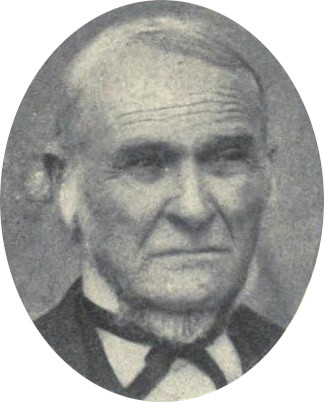
Johnson later in life

Johnson was a polygamist and married five women. He married Anna Pixley Johnson on November 22, 1826. He married Susan Bryant on October 20, 1840. He married Lucina Alzina Bascom, age 29 and Janet Fife, age 17, on October 25, 1845. Both Bascom and Bryant later divorced from him. Bryant died April 7, 1896, in the Mormon colonies in Mexico and Bascom died October 5, 1885, in Provo, Utah Territory. In 1861, at age 58, he married 20-year-old Margaret Threlkeld. Johnson fathered 25 children and was the brother of Benjamin F. Johnson. Johnson maintained a journal in which was found the earliest source for the interpretation of "hot drinks" in the Word of Wisdom meaning coffee and tea. Johnson has been included in a list of "75 significant Mormon poets."

== Death ==
Johnson died September 24, 1882, in Johnson, Utah Territory (now Kane County, Utah) at age 80.
