= KNYN =

- Fort Bridger, Wyoming; United States
- Broadcast area: Evanston, Wyoming
- Frequency: 99.1 MHz
- Branding: K-9 Country, The Big Dog

Programming
- Format: Country

Ownership
- Owner: M. Kent Frandsen; (Old West Media)
- Sister stations: KADQ-FM, KBRV, KACH

History
- First air date: 2001

Technical information
- Licensing authority: FCC
- Facility ID: 87470
- Class: C1
- ERP: 27,500 watts
- HAAT: 489 meters (1,604 ft)
- Transmitter coordinates: 41°21′10″N 110°54′26″W

Links
- Public license information: Public file; LMS
- Webcast: Listen live
- Website: mylocalradio.com

KNYN (99.1 FM) is an radio station licensed to Fort Bridger, Wyoming. The station carries a country music format.

Former logo prior to 2010

KNYN has carried audio from the General Conference of the Latter Day Saints, from Salt Lake City. KNYN is an affiliate of Day Weather, a statewide weather forecast provided to radio stations.

== History ==
KNYN began as a construction permit in 1998.

It was owned by M. Kent Frandsen. The station received its license to cover on September 7, 2001. The station was known as Magic 99, carrying a hot adult contemporary format. For much of its life, KNYN was a sister station to KEVA 1240 AM through a local marketing agreement, or LMA. In 2010, the owners of KEVA station decided to return KNYN to Frandsen.

KNYN was originally part of a larger frequency shuffle in Salt Lake City, about 63 air miles from Evanston. KNYN would change frequencies to 103.9 and move to Humpy Peak, where former sister KOTB moved when it changed from 106.1 to 106.3 MHz. The move ultimately did not happen.

The station flipped formats to country music.

In the mid-1990s, the frequency was home to KNYN 'Canyon Country,' in Sana Fe, NM. It was owned by James O'Leary's Plaza Broadcasting and operated from studios at 1718 W. Alameda Street.

== Tower collapses ==
The tower for KNYN is located on Medicine Butte. The original tower built in 2001 collapsed during the winter of 2003. A new tower was built in 2004. On the night of November 14, 2005, high winds and icing toppled the new tower. The tower was owned by Uinta Communications, who also owned the building KNYN was renting. No damage was done to the building, but the tower crumpled. KNYN was on its backup antenna at the time of collapse and continued to operate.

KNYN is licensed for 27,500 watts, but has been operating by special temporary authority since the collapse.
