= KACH =

- Preston, Idaho; United States
- Frequency: 1340 kHz

Programming
- Format: Classic hits
- Affiliations: ABC News Radio

Ownership
- Owner: Val R. Cook; (Preston Broadcasting, LLC)
- Sister stations: KBRV, KADQ, KNYN

History
- First air date: September 6, 1948
- Former call signs: KPST (1948–1976)
- Call sign meaning: Cache Valley

Technical information
- Licensing authority: FCC
- Facility ID: 74476
- Class: C
- Power: 1,000 watts
- Transmitter coordinates: 42°7′27.7″N 111°50′47.8″W
- Translator: 106.1 K291CV (Preston)

Links
- Public license information: Public file; LMS
- Webcast: Listen live
- Website: kachradio.com

KACH (1340 AM) is a radio station broadcasting a classic hits format to the Preston, Idaho, United States area. The station is currently owned by Val Cook, through licensee Preston Broadcasting, LLC.

KACH is an affiliate of the Utah State Aggies football team, carrying their games.

== History ==
Previous logo with older format

The station signed on the air September 6, 1948, as KPST. In 1948, the station was owned by Voice of the Rockies, Inc. It was later sold in the 1970s to Cache Country Inc. The transmitter is located on Mink Creek Road in Preston. At sign on, KACH was limited to 250 watts, which was standard for "local" radio stations licensed by the FCC at the time. KACH upgraded to 1,000 watts on April 21, 1971. In the 1970s, the station operated under what are known as specified hours, which means the station did not operate during the entire day. The license was modified in 1978 so that the station could broadcast around the clock. On November 22, 1976, the station's current call letters were adopted.

In April 1998, the station was purchased by Alan J. White, who had previously worked with KVEL. KACH also began broadcasting via FM on a translator station K288AG, which is also licensed to Preston. The FM frequency is 105.5 MHz. The FM signal covers roughly the same area as the AM signal, except during nighttime hours when skywave propagation is present for KACH.

Effective August 28, 2018, Alan White sold KACH and the construction permit for as-yet-unlicensed translator K291CV to Val Cook's Preston Broadcasting for $235,000.

== Translator ==
In addition to the main station, KACH is relayed by an FM translator to widen its broadcast area. The translator broadcasts from a peak located west of the KACH studios.

Broadcast translator for KACH
Call sign	Frequency	City of license	FID	ERP (W)	Class	FCC info
K291CV	106.1 FM	Preston, Idaho	202884	250	D	LMS
