= No-Ni-Shee Arch =

Temporary archway in Salt Lake City, Utah, U.S.

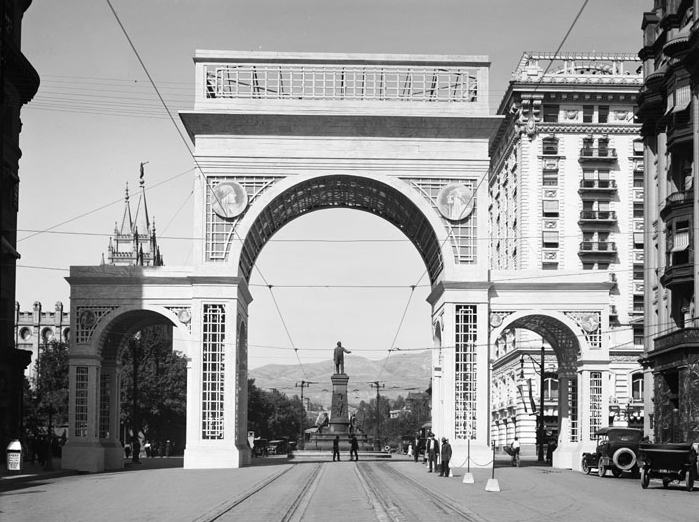
- No-Ni-Shee Arch, 1916. The Brigham Young statue is framed by the arch, and the Salt Lake Temple is to the left.
- Location: Salt Lake City, U.S.
- Type: Arch
- Completion date: 1916

The No-Ni-Shee Arch was a temporary archway near the intersection of Main Street and South Temple in downtown Salt Lake City. The archway was built in 1916 for the Wizard of the Wasatch festival.

No-Ni-Shee was the name of a mythical American Indian Salt Princess. Her tears caused the Great Salt Lake to be salty. The arch was dedicated to her and sprayed with salt water so that salt eventually crystallized on Main Street.

Hatumai, the Wizard of the Wasatch, lived with Queen Sirrah in a cavern far up City Creek Canyon, attended by legions of fairies. Hatumai was the great Spirit of the state, who eons ago laid down the precious metals and conditioned the soil to bring forth fruits and flowers. He guarded the Indians and guided the pioneers and miners, and once each year he visited his capital city.

For a clue to Hatumai's identity, read his name backwards. Hatumai was the creation of Fisher Harris, a Virginian who moved to Salt Lake in 1889 and became a notable Utah businessman. Harris announced in 1908 that he had been appointed scribe to the Wizard. He transmitted Hatumai's orders to the Commercial Club, a social club for businessmen, which, during the carnival season, reorganized itself as the Wards of the Wizard of the Wasatch.

The Wizard's carnivals enlivened Utah’s summers for several years. The last Wizard of the Wasatch carnival was held in 1916, on the eve of World War I.
