= Keva (mythology) =

Figure in Irish mythology

Caoimhe or Cébha "of the Fair Skin" (known as Keeva or Keva in English) was a minor character in the Fenian Cycle of Irish mythology, daughter of the hero Fionn mac Cumhail and wife of his enemy, Goll mac Morna. In some versions of the story Goll was offered her hand in marriage after he slew a hag on Fionn's behalf.
