= KEVA =

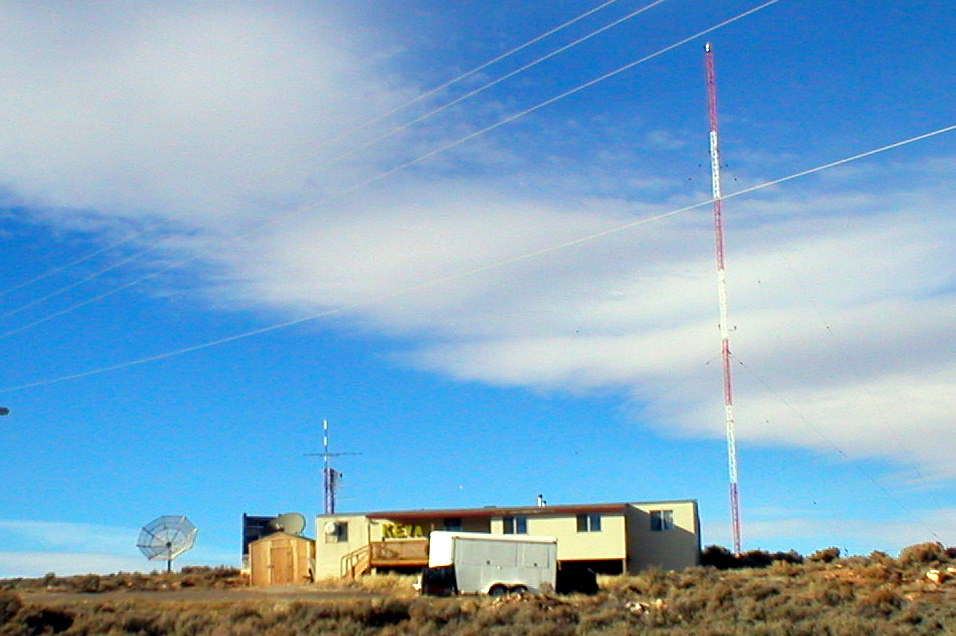
- KEVA's studios and tower located outside of Evanston, Wyoming.
- Evanston, Wyoming; United States
- Broadcast area: Southwestern Wyoming
- Frequency: 1240 kHz

Ownership
- Owner: Sagebrush Broadcasting Company, Inc.
- Sister stations: KNYN

History
- First air date: June 17, 1953
- Last air date: July 2, 2014; (61 years, 15 days)
- Former call signs: KLUK (1953–1963)
- Call sign meaning: Evanston

Technical information
- Facility ID: 20028
- Class: C
- Power: 880 watts (unlimited)
- Transmitter coordinates: 41°15′29″N 111°0′51″W

KEVA (1240 AM) was an radio station licensed to Evanston, Wyoming, United States. KEVA had been on the air in southwestern Wyoming from 1953 to 2014, and was one of the area's oldest radio stations. It offered classic country, local programming throughout the day as well, including news, classifieds, and weather. The station broadcast in C-QUAM AM stereo.

KEVA's logo when it was a country station.

== History ==
The station signed on the air on June 16, 1953, as KLUK. It was a daytime only station, initially only licensed for 250 watts. This was the limit at the time for local signals by the FCC. The station wouldn't become 1,000 watts until 1961.

KEVA's tower and studio were located on Airport Road just outside town. KEVA's former sister station was KOTB, on 106.1 MHz. It was also a sister station to KNYN, which was sold to another owner.

KEVA ceased broadcasting July 2, 2014, due to failure of their transmitter. Attempts to repair it were unsuccessful. Attempts to find a new owner and money for a new transmitter were also unsuccessful. It was taken off the air. KEVA's license was canceled on May 3, 2017, for failure to pay debts it owed to the Federal Communications Commission (FCC).
