= KADQ-FM =

- Evanston, Wyoming; United States
- Frequency: 98.3 MHz
- Branding: Wildlife 98.3

Programming
- Format: Classic rock

Ownership
- Owner: Frandsen Media Company, LLC
- Sister stations: KNYN, KBRV, KACH

History
- First air date: 2005
- Former call signs: KSNA (2006)

Technical information
- Licensing authority: FCC
- Facility ID: 164152
- Class: C2
- ERP: 1,200 watts
- HAAT: 454 meters
- Transmitter coordinates: 41°21′10″N 110°54′31″W

Links
- Public license information: Public file; LMS
- Webcast: Listen live
- Website: Official website

KADQ-FM (98.3 FM) is a radio station licensed to Evanston, Wyoming, United States. The station is currently owned by Frandsen Media Company, LLC and carries a classic rock format. KADQ is an affiliate of the Cowboy Sports Network, carrying University of Wyoming sports broadcasts.

== History ==
This station received its original construction permit from the Federal Communications Commission on April 1, 2005. The construction permit was owned by College Creek Media. The station's call letters were initially KSNA. It was assigned new call letters in 2006 while still under construction. The station began broadcasts on April 3, 2008, after receiving a license to cover.

The station initially carried a religious format, owned by College Creek Media. It was sold in 2010 to Frandsen Media Company, LLC

== Silent ==
On April 30, 2008, the station informed the FCC that it had fallen silent on April 22, 2008, and citing financial reasons, it requested special temporary authority to remain silent. The FCC granted this request on September 10, 2008, with a scheduled expiration of March 9, 2009. On February 26, 2009, KADQ-FM filed for an extension of their remain silent authority but this request was dismissed on January 7, 2010. The station resumed broadcasting briefly on March 30, 2009, but fell silent again on March 31, 2009. As of January 23, 2010, the station's April 7, 2009, application for remain silent authority had been accepted for filing but was pending further action by the commission.

The station's transmitter is located on Medicine Butte, northeast of Evanston.
