= Mutual Improvement Association =

Mutual Improvement Association or MIA can refer to

- Young Men (organization), a Latter-day Saints organisation formerly called the Young Men's Mutual Improvement Association
- Young Women (organization), a Latter-day Saints organisation formerly called the Young Ladies' National Mutual Improvement Association and the Young Women's Mutual Improvement Association
