= KPCQ =

- Chubbuck, Idaho; United States
- Broadcast area: Pocatello
- Frequency: 1490 kHz

Programming
- Format: Defunct (was Contemporary Christian)

Ownership
- Owner: Ted Austin; (Snake River Radio, LLC)

History
- First air date: September 12, 1980 (as KKLB)
- Former call signs: KKLB (1980–1987); KRCD (1987–1998); KRTK (1998–2019)

Technical information
- Licensing authority: FCC
- Facility ID: 24627
- Class: C
- Power: 1,000 watts unlimited
- Transmitter coordinates: 42°55′38″N 112°30′3″W

Links
- Public license information: Public file; LMS

KPCQ (1490 AM) was a radio station broadcasting a Contemporary Christian format. Licensed to serve Chubbuck, Idaho, United States, the station served the Pocatello area. The station was owned by Ted Austin, through licensee Snake River Radio, LLC.

== History ==
The station went on the air as KKLB on September 12, 1980. On February 4, 1987, the station changed its call sign to KRCD. On July 13, 1998, the call again changed, this time to KRTK. On February 15, 2019, the station changed its call sign to KPCQ.

Between February 1, 2018 and October 1, 2021, KPCQ was operating 262 days (20% of the license term) and silent 1,077 days (80% of the license term). The Federal Communications Commission cancelled the license on December 19, 2023.
