= List of mass shootings in the United States in 2023 =

Mass shootings in the contiguous United States in 2023
Mass shootings in Hawaii in 2023
Mass shootings in Puerto Rico in 2023
Mass shootings in the United States Virgin Islands in 2023

This is a list of mass shootings that took place in the United States in 2023. Mass shootings are incidents in which several people are victims of firearm-related violence, specifically for the purposes of this article, a total of four or more victims. A total of 754 people were killed and 2,443 other people were injured in 604 shootings.

== Definitions ==
Several different inclusion criteria are used; there is no generally accepted definition. Gun Violence Archive, a nonprofit research group that tracks shootings and their characteristics in the United States, defines a mass shooting as an incident in which four or more people, excluding the perpetrator(s), are shot in one location at roughly the same time. The Congressional Research Service provides a definition of four or more killed. The Washington Post and Mother Jones use similar definitions, with the latter acknowledging that their definition "is a conservative measure of the problem", as many shootings with fewer fatalities occur. The crowdsourced Mass Shooting Tracker project applies the most expansive definition: four or more shot in any incident, including the perpetrator.

A 2019 study of mass shootings published in the journal Injury Epidemiology recommended developing "a standard definition that considers both fatalities and nonfatalities to most appropriately convey the burden of mass shootings on gun violence." The authors of the study further suggested that "the definition of mass shooting should be four or more people, excluding the shooter, who are shot in a single event regardless of the motive, setting or number of deaths."

Definitions generally exclude consideration of the number of persons targeted with lethal intent, perhaps with degraded accuracy from a greater distance, who escape injury from bullets or bullet spall, regardless of injury sustained while evading live gunfire, or medical complications resulting from those injuries (such as infection, concussion, stroke, or PTSD) further down the road.

- Stanford University MSA Data Project: three or more persons shot in one incident, excluding the perpetrator(s), at one location, at roughly the same time. Excluded are shootings associated with organized crime, gangs or drug wars.
- Mass Shooting Tracker: four or more persons shot in one incident, at one location, at roughly the same time.
- Gun Violence Archive/Vox: four or more shot in one incident, excluding the perpetrators, at one location, at roughly the same time.
- Mother Jones: three or more shot and killed in one incident at a public place, excluding the perpetrators. This list excludes all shootings the organization considers to be "conventionally motivated" such as all gang violence and armed robberies.
- The Washington Post: four or more shot and killed in one incident at a public place, excluding the perpetrators.
- ABC News/FBI: (Note: The FBI does not use the "mass shooting" term but uses a broader term, "mass murder" when four or more victims are slain, in one event, at one location, not including the perpetrator.) four or more shot and killed in one incident, excluding the perpetrators, at one location, at roughly the same time.
- Congressional Research Service: four or more shot and killed in one incident, excluding the perpetrators, at a public place, excluding gang-related killings and those done with a profit-motive.

Only incidents considered mass shootings by at least two of the above sources are listed below. Many incidents involving organized crime and gang violence are included.

All definitions can be exceeded with a single shotgun blast into a target cluster at short range. Mass shootings do not require multiple gunshots.

For statistical purposes, armed accomplices are likely to be classified as perpetrators, even if later analysis determines that the accomplice never discharged a firearm. Bystanders struck by bullets fired in self defense by another bystander would potentially be classified as victims of a mass shooting, while a bystander firing in self defense who injures or kills another bystander would almost certainly not be classified as a perpetrator. The classification of a bystander struck by police while attempting to take out a believed perpetrator falls into a gray zone.

== List ==
2023 date	Location	State or territory	Dead	Injured	Total	Description
December 31	Little River	South Carolina	2	2	4	Less than an hour before midnight at a bar a shooting left two people, including a teenager, dead and two others injured.
December 31	Charlotte (4)	North Carolina	0	5	5	Five people were injured in a shooting at Romare Bearden Park in Uptown Charlotte.
December 31	Hawthorne	California	1	4	5	One person was killed and four others were injured near a strip mall.
December 30	Denver (7)	Colorado	2	2	4	Two men were killed and two others injured in a shooting in the West Colfax neighborhood.
December 30	Gainesville	Florida	0	4	4	Four people were shot near a food store.
December 30	New City	New York	4 (Note: Including the perpetrator or suspect)	0	4	A Bronxville police sergeant killed his wife and their two children before killing himself.
December 29	Helena	Montana	0	4	4	An argument led to a shooting/stabbing that left four people injured in Downtown Helena.
December 24	Colorado Springs (2)	Colorado	1	3	4	One person was killed and three others were wounded in The Citadel mall.
December 24	Houston (12)	Texas	1	4	5	One person was killed and four others were wounded after an argument lead to a shootout in Southeast Houston.
December 24	Lockhart	Florida	1	4	5	A woman was killed and four men were wounded in a targeted shooting.
December 24	Seattle (5)	Washington	0	5	5	A drive-by shooting in Downtown Seattle near Occidental Park left five people injured.
December 23	Fort Worth (4)	Texas	1	4	5	An argument about a missing item led to a shooting that killed one and injured four others at a home in the Hamlet neighborhood.
December 23	Woodlawn	Maryland	1	4	5	One man was killed and four others were injured in a targeted shooting at a strip mall.
December 22	New York City (8)	New York	1	3	4	A man was killed and three others were wounded in a likely gang-related shooting in the South Jamaica neighborhood of Queens.
December 21	Ceiba	Puerto Rico	0	4	4	Two teenagers and two adults were wounded on Highway 53.
December 21	Washington (5)	District of Columbia	1	3	4	One person was killed and three others were wounded near Nationals Park in Southwest D.C.
December 20	Philadelphia (21)	Pennsylvania	1	3	4	Four people were shot, including a teenager, on a street in the Eastwick neighborhood. One man was killed.
December 18	Phoenix (3)	Arizona	4	0	4	A man opened fire at an auto repair shop, killing two, before driving southeast to a home and killing a child and a dog before committing suicide.
December 17	Clarke County	Alabama	0	4	4	An argument led to a shooting near Alma that left four men injured.
December 17	Okatie	South Carolina	2	2	4	Two twin brothers were killed and two others injured in a shooting at a bar during the early morning hours.
December 16	Austin (3)	Texas	1	3	4	A man injured three people outside a Downtown Austin bar before being killed in a shootout with police.
December 15	Willowbrook	California	1	4	5	A 32-year-old man was killed and four others were injured in a shooting at a strip mall.
December 15	Memphis (15)	Tennessee	2	3	5	Two men, a 21-year-old and 20-year-old were killed and three others critically injured in a targeted shooting at a car wash in the Autumn Ridge neighborhood.
December 14	Cass County	Illinois	4	1	5	A man was wounded and a woman was killed in a shooting at a home in Philadelphia. The wounded man informed responding officers of another shooting in Ashland where two women were found killed in a home. The shooter was later found dead from a self-inflicted gunshot in a car in Jacksonville.
December 12	Jefferson County	Indiana	4	0	4	Firefighters found a woman and three children fatally shot while responding to a fire which broke out in their home outside of Madison.
December 11	Las Vegas (2)	Nevada	4	1	5	A man fatally shot three people, including a child, and critically injured another child before fatally shooting himself in an apartment in northwest Las Vegas.
December 10	Philadelphia (20)	Pennsylvania	2	2	4	A 32-year-old man and a 28-year-old woman were killed and two others were injured in a shooting during the early morning in the North Philadelphia West neighborhood.
December 9	Atlanta (6)	Georgia	3	1	4	Three people were killed and another was injured during a failed drug deal.
December 6	El Paso County	Colorado	4	1	5	Shortly before midnight a shooting at a home northeast of Peyton left four people dead and a man injured. It was later disclosed that one of the deceased was the shooter.
December 6	Green Valley	West Virginia	2	2	4	A man killed an 11-year-old girl and injured two others before shooting himself.
December 6	Paradise	Nevada	4	3	7	2023 UNLV shooting: A man who had applied to be a professor at UNLV opened fire on the campus, killing three people and injuring three others including two police officers in a shooting spree before being killed in a shoot-out with responding officers.
December 5	Austin (2) and Bexar County	Texas	6	3	9	2023 Austin shootings: A suspect killed four people and injured three others in a shooting spree in Austin. Another shooting in Bexar County that killed two was also connected to the suspect.
December 4	Lugoff	South Carolina	1	3	4	A 21-year-old man was killed and three others were injured on I-20.
December 3	Five Corners	Washington	5	0	5	Five people were found dead in their home. The shooter was identified as one of the people killed.
December 3	Dallas (11)	Texas	5	1	6	Four were killed and one was injured in their home in southeast Dallas. The perpetrator killed himself during a confrontation with police a day after the shooting.
December 3	Houston (11)	Texas	1	3	4	One woman was killed and three others were hospitalized in a shooting at a club in southern Houston.
December 2	Aurora	Colorado	0	4	4	Four people suffered gunshot wounds at a house party in the Del Mar Parkway neighborhood.
December 2	Columbus (6)	Ohio	0	4	4	Four people, including a teenager, were shot following an argument in the Mount Vernon neighborhood as they left a home.
December 2	McComb	Mississippi	0	5	5	Five people who had attended a repast for a shooting victim across the street were wounded in a shooting at a gas station.
December 2	Fresno	California	2	2	4	A shooting erupted at a gathering, leaving two men dead and two others wounded in the Cincotta neighborhood.
December 1	Las Vegas (1)	Nevada	1	4	5	Five homeless people were shot, one fatally, in the city's east side.
November 29	Chicago (22)	Illinois	1	3	4	Four people were shot in Homan Square during a fight. One victim later died of his injuries. A 23-year-old female was later arrested in connection of the incident.
November 29	Davidson County	North Carolina	0	5	5	Five people were shot after a fight erupted at a home south of Lexington.
November 27	New Orleans (7)	Louisiana	1	4	5	Five people were shot, one fatally, in two separate but related shootings.
November 26	Sampson County (2)	North Carolina	4	0	4	Three people were killed at a homeless camp before the suspect shot themself.
November 26	Winston-Salem (3)	North Carolina	0	5	5	Five people were injured in an early morning shooting at a bar.
November 25	Fontana and Jurupa Valley	California	3	1	4	A man shot and killed his girlfriend and another person before killing an ex-girlfriend at another location then got into an altercation with another person who he non-fatally shot.
November 23	Memphis (14)	Tennessee	0	4	4	Two suspects shot and injured four people before fleeing.
November 23	DeKalb County	Georgia	0	4	4	Four people were injured when someone fired over 100 rounds into a home in the early morning hours.
November 23	Chicago (21)	Illinois	0	5	5	Five teens were injured in a drive-by shooting outside of United Center.
November 22	Lumberton	North Carolina	0	6	6	Six people were injured at a restaurant.
November 22	Goodman	Mississippi	1	3	4	One person was killed and three were injured in a drive-by shooting near a gas station.
November 21	Welby	Colorado	4	0	4	A man opened fire at a home, killing three people including a relative, before committing suicide.
November 21	Monterey County	California	2	2	4	Two people were killed and two others were injured in a bar shooting outside of Pajaro.
November 21	Philadelphia (19)	Pennsylvania	2	5	7	Two people were killed and five others were injured in North Philadelphia.
November 20	Custer County	Colorado	3	1	4	Three people were killed and one was injured over a property dispute.
November 20	Beavercreek	Ohio	1	4	5	A man shot injured four people at a Walmart and then killed himself.
November 19	Lorain	Ohio	4	0	4	A man fatally shot his wife and two children before killing himself.
November 19	Port Arthur	Texas	0	5	5	Five people were injured in a possible drive-by shooting.
November 19	Memphis (13)	Tennessee	5	1	6	A man killed four people and injured a fifth before killing himself.
November 19	Tulsa (4)	Oklahoma	2	3	5	Two people were killed and three were injured in a home.
November 18	La Presa	California	0	7 (Note: Five injured by gunfire)	7	Five people were shot and two juveniles were injured by fireworks.
November 18	Little Rock (2)	Arkansas	1	4	5	One person was killed and four others were injured.
November 16	Mentor	Ohio	4	1	5	Four people, including the suspect, were killed and one person was injured at a trailer park.
November 15	Baltimore (12)	Maryland	0	4	4	Four people were shot in southwest Baltimore.
November 14	Springfield (2)	Massachusetts	1	3	4	One person was killed and three others were injured.
November 13	Carolina	Puerto Rico	0	4	4	Three men and a woman were wounded outside a tobacco store.
November 12	Pearland	Texas	1	4	5	A child was killed and four others were injured at a flea market.
November 12	South Hill	Washington	0	6	6	Two teens and four adults were shot at a house party in an Airbnb property near Puyallup.
November 11	Portsmouth	Virginia	0	4	4	Four people were shot.
November 10	Independence	Missouri	0	4	4	Four people were shot in a shopping mall.
November 10	Birmingham (4)	Alabama	0	4	4	Four people were shot on Interstate 59 during a shootout.
November 5	Prairie View	Texas	0	7	7	Seven people were injured at a homecoming ceremony after an argument.
November 5	Kansas City (6)	Missouri	0	4	4	Four people were shot in a home after an argument.
November 5	Atlanta (5)	Georgia	0	6	6	Six people were shot in southeastern Atlanta.
November 5	Phoenix (2)	Arizona	0	4	4	Four people, including a teenager, were shot at a large gathering in central Phoenix.
November 5	Tacoma	Washington	2	3	5	Two people were killed and three others were injured at a business.
November 5	Indianapolis (8)	Indiana	1	4	5	One person was killed and four others were injured in a shooting in southern Indianapolis.
November 5	Denver (6)	Colorado	2	5	7	Two people were killed and five were injured in an early morning shooting in Park Hill.
November 4	Galveston (2)	Texas	0	6	6	Six people were shot at a motorcycle rally. The perpetrator claimed to be targeting rival gang members.
November 4	Richmond Heights	Ohio	1	3	4	An early morning shooting killed one person and injured three others.
November 3	Cincinnati (4)	Ohio	1	5	6	An 11-year-old boy was killed and five were injured, including other children, in a shooting in the West End neighborhood.
November 1	Dallas (10)	Texas	0	5	5	Five people were injured near Fair Park.
October 31	Salinas	California	0	7	7	Seven people were shot at a Halloween party.
October 30	Minneapolis (7)	Minnesota	0	4	4	Four women were shot at a party.
October 29	Wilson	North Carolina	0	4	4	Four people were injured in a shooting at a birthday party.
October 29	Vincent	California	0	5 (Note: Four injured by gunfire)	5	Four people were shot and one was stabbed at a late night Halloween party outside of Azusa.
October 29	Dodge City (2)	Kansas	2	2	4	Two people were killed and two were injured in a shooting at a bar.
October 29	Calcasieu Parish	Louisiana	0	6	6	Six teenagers were injured in a shooting at a party.
October 29	Pittsburgh (4)	Pennsylvania	0	4	4	Four people were injured in a shooting in the Carrick neighborhood.
October 29	Chicago (20)	Illinois	0	15	15	2023 Chicago Halloween party shooting: Fifteen people were injured after a shooting occurred at a Halloween party in the North Lawndale neighborhood.
October 29	Atlanta (4)	Georgia	1	3	4	Four people, including two students, were shot near the campus of Georgia State University in the early morning. One of the victims died from her injuries on November 6.
October 29	Indianapolis (7)	Indiana	1	9	10	One person was killed and nine were injured in a shooting at a party.
October 29	Tampa (2)	Florida	2	16	18	2023 Ybor City shootings: Two people were killed and sixteen were injured in a street fight after a Halloween party in the Ybor City neighborhood.
October 28	Chula Vista	California	0	4	4	Four people were shot at a restaurant in a mall after a dispute.
October 28	San Antonio (4)	Texas	2	3	5	Two people were killed and three others were injured after an argument between neighbors escalated into a shootout.
October 28	Texarkana	Texas	3	3	6	Six people were shot, three of whom were killed, after a fist fight escalated into a shooting.
October 27	Mansfield	Ohio	2	4	6	Two teenagers were killed and four others were injured after a shooting broke out at a party.
October 26	Sampson County	North Carolina	5	0	5	Five people were killed in a late night shooting at a home near Clinton.
October 25	Lewiston	Maine	19	13	32	2023 Lewiston shootings: Eighteen people, fifteen men and three women, were killed and thirteen others were injured in a spree shooting at a bowling alley and a bar. The shooter was found dead two days later from an apparent self-inflicted gunshot wound.
October 24	Greenville (2)	North Carolina	1	3	4	One person was killed and three were injured in a shooting at a convenience store.
October 21	Oakley	California	1	3	4	A teenager was killed and three others were injured at a late night party at a residence.
October 20	San Juan (3)	Puerto Rico	0	4	4	Four people were injured in front of a nightclub in the Santurce barrio.
October 19	Toppenish	Washington	4	1	5	An estranged boyfriend opened fire at a home, killing his girlfriend and two teenagers before killing himself. Another man was critically wounded.
October 19	Seattle (4)	Washington	1	3	4	A man was killed and three others were injured in a shooting near Golden Gardens Park in the Ballard neighborhood.
October 16	Los Angeles (9)	California	3	1	4	A drive-by shooting outside a Mexican restaurant in the Toluca Lake neighborhood left three men dead and another injured.
October 15	Minneapolis (6)	Minnesota	0	4	4	Four people were injured overnight in a drive-by shooting in the North Loop neighborhood of Central Minneapolis.
October 14	Denver (5)	Colorado	3	3	6	Three people were killed and three others were injured at a late night party in the city's northeast side.
October 12	Glendorado Township	Minnesota	0	6	6	Near Princeton, five police officers sustained non-life-threatening injuries after being shot by a suspect while executing a search warrant. The suspect, who was shot in the foot, was apprehended several hours later.
October 8	Chicago (19)	Illinois	0	8	8	Eight people were injured outside Blum Restaurant & Bar in the River North neighborhood.
October 8	Chevy Chase Heights	Pennsylvania	1	8	9	One person was killed and eight others were injured at a party at the Chevy Chase Community Center.
October 7	St. Petersburg	Florida	0	7	7	Seven people were injured after an altercation escalated into a shooting.
October 7	Inglewood	California	2	3	5	Two men were killed and three other men were injured in a parking lot in what police believe was a targeted shooting.
October 4	Holyoke	Massachusetts	1	3	4	Three men got into a dispute outside a store, leading to a shooting. One man was shot in the leg, another in the hand, and a pregnant woman sitting in a passing bus was struck by gunfire. The woman was hospitalized and her baby was delivered, but the baby died shortly after.
October 4	Philadelphia (18)	Pennsylvania	1	4	5	A man and three police officers responding to a domestic disturbance call were injured when another man opened fire. The suspect was then killed by police.
October 3	Jersey City (2)	New Jersey	0	6	6	Five people were shot late at night. A sixth person was injured when a car carrying one of the victims to a hospital crashed.
October 3	Baltimore (11)	Maryland	0	5	5	Five people were shot during a homecoming event on the campus of Morgan State University. The shooting led to the cancellation of the school's scheduled football game against Stony Brook later that week.
October 2	Philadelphia (17)	Pennsylvania	4	1	5	A man killed three people and critically wounded a woman at a home in the Crescentville neighborhood before being killed in a short gun battle with police. A police officer suffered an injury from broken glass.
October 1	Harris County	Texas	2	2	4	A woman and her daughter-in-law were killed and two men were injured after a dispute in a home escalated.
October 1	Lexington	Kentucky	0	4	4	Four people were injured after an argument escalated. A suspect was arrested at the scene.
October 1	Omaha	Nebraska	1	5	6	A teenager was killed and five were injured at an after hours party.
September 24	Richland County	South Carolina	3	1	4	A teenager killed three other teens and injured another after a fight escalated.
September 23	Downey	California	0	4	4	After being ejected from a local restaurant, a couple allegedly returned and fired into the bar from their vehicle critically wounding four.
September 23	Jacksonville (2)	Florida	3	1	4	Two adults and a toddler were killed at an apartment after an argument rose over the selling of a dog. A third adult from the group was also injured.
September 22	Orlando (2)	Florida	1	3	4	Four people were injured in a shooting outside of an apartment. One of the victims later died from their injuries.
September 22	Minneapolis (5)	Minnesota	0	4	4	Four men were injured in the Lyn-Lake area at about 10:40 p.m.
September 18	Spring Lake	North Carolina	1	3	4	A mother and three children, including her daughter, were injured in their vehicle during the evening. The mother later died from her injuries at a hospital.
September 18	Charlotte (3)	North Carolina	0	4	4	Four people were injured during the morning in uptown Charlotte.
September 17	Boston (3)	Massachusetts	0	5	5	Five people were injured in the Dorchester neighborhood.
September 17	El Paso (4)	Texas	2	4	6	One man was killed and five others were injured at a house party. A 14-year-old girl who was wounded during the attack died two days later at a hospital.
September 16	Romeoville	Illinois	6	0	6	Two adults and two children were killed at their home in Romeoville. The shooter was tracked down with his fiancée at Catoosa, Oklahoma. During an attempted traffic stop, the shooter crashed his vehicle. Afterwards, he killed his fiancée and then himself.
September 16	Denver (4)	Colorado	0	5	5	Five people were injured during the night in Lower Downtown Denver.
September 13	Philadelphia (16)	Pennsylvania	0	4	4	Four people were injured during the night in North Philadelphia.
September 11	Palm Bay	Florida	0	4	4	Four teenagers were injured during the night at an apartment complex.
September 10	Jersey City (1)	New Jersey	0	4	4	Four people were shot late at night.
September 10	Detroit (6)	Michigan	2	2	4	Two people are dead and two others wounded after a shooting on Detroit's west side that police say stemmed from a fight.
September 10	Indianapolis (6)	Indiana	0	5	5	Five women were injured when a fight escalated on the city's northwest side.
September 4	Birmingham (3)	Alabama	2	3	5	Two women were killed and three other people were injured at a hospital.
September 3	Atlanta (3)	Georgia	1	5	6	An 18-year-old man injured five people, including a toddler and another teenager, during a dispute in a home in northwest Atlanta before killing himself.
September 3	Freeport	Illinois	1	3	4	A man died and three others were shot in a gang related shooting.
September 3	High Point (2)	North Carolina	1	3	4	A man was killed and three others wounded.
September 3	Galveston (1)	Texas	2	2	4	Two men were killed and two others wounded at an early morning house party in the West End.
September 2	Lynn	Massachusetts	2	7	8	One person was killed and seven injured in an apparently targeted early morning shooting at a house party.
August 30	Houston (10)	Texas	0	4	4	Four people were wounded in an evening drive-by shooting at a food truck park in the Galleria.
August 30	Peoria (2)	Illinois	0	6	6	Police responding to a ShotSpotter alert on the city's south side found six people injured.
August 27	Detroit (5)	Michigan	1	4	5	One person was killed and four others were injured at a motorcycle club on the city's west side.
August 27	Louisville (6)	Kentucky	2	4	6	Two people were killed and four were injured at a lounge early in the morning in Downtown Louisville.
August 26	Joppatowne	Maryland	4	0	4	A man killed three people in an apartment before killing himself.
August 26	Boston (2)	Massachusetts	0	8	8	Eight people were injured in the Dorchester neighborhood during a Caribbean Carnival parade.
August 26	Jacksonville (1)	Florida	4	0	4	2023 Jacksonville shooting: After being turned away from Edward Waters University by security, a white man with a swastika-adorned rifle attacked a Dollar General store, killing three Black people before committing suicide, in what is believed to be a racially motivated hate crime.
August 25	Choctaw	Oklahoma	1	4	5	A 16-year-old boy was killed and four others were injured at a high school football game.
August 25	Pasadena	California	0	5	5	Five people were injured after a fight in the parking lot of an apartment complex escalated.
August 24	Uniontown	Ohio	5	0	5	Police responding to a domestic disturbance call found a couple and their three children dead in an apparent murder-suicide.
August 23	Trabuco Canyon	California	4	6	10	2023 Trabuco Canyon shooting: Four people were killed and six others were injured at the Cook's Corner bar. The shooter was killed by responding deputies.
August 22	Madison County	Mississippi	2	2	4	After responding to a domestic disturbance call, police found two people injured and one dead, then killed the suspect after a brief pursuit.
August 21	Upper Darby Township	Pennsylvania	1	3	4	One person was killed and three others were injured at a luncheon for a homicide victim.
August 20	Seattle (3)	Washington	3	6	9	Three people were killed and six others were injured at a hookah bar in the Rainier Valley district.
August 20	Minneapolis (4)	Minnesota	0	8	8	Eight people were injured near Peavy Field Park.
August 19	Milwaukee (5)	Wisconsin	0	9	9	Nine people were injured in the Muskego Way area.
August 19	Philadelphia (15)	Pennsylvania	1	6	7	A person was killed and six were injured at a block party in the Parkside neighborhood of West Philadelphia.
August 17	Spring Valley	Nevada	1	3	4	A man killed his estranged wife and injured three others.
August 16	Oklahoma City (3)	Oklahoma	5	0	5	After responding to a domestic disturbance call, police found five people dead, including three children, in an apparent murder-suicide.
August 16	Louisville (5)	Kentucky	0	4	4	Four people were injured after a fight at an apartment complex in the Russell neighborhood escalated.
August 16	Clarksville	Tennessee	2 (Note: Including at least one of the perpetrators)	5	7	Two brothers who were wanted for aggravated burglary were killed and four police officers and a hostage were injured during a 10-hour standoff.
August 14	Springfield (1)	Massachusetts	3	1	4	A man killed his neighbor and her dog and injured her two grandchildren before killing himself. One of the children died from her injuries three days later.
August 13	Cincinnati (3)	Ohio	0	4	4	Four people were injured near the University of Cincinnati.
August 13	Chicago (18)	Illinois	0	4	4	Four people were injured in the Old Town neighborhood on the Near North Side.
August 13	Chicago (17)	Illinois	1	3	4	One man was killed and three other people were injured in the Washington Park neighborhood.
August 13	Memphis (12)	Tennessee	0	8	8	Eight people were injured early in the morning in Downtown Memphis.
August 12	Grand Rapids	Michigan	0	4	4	Four people were injured in Southeast Grand Rapids.
August 11	Pine Bluff (3)	Arkansas	0	5	5	Four people were injured in a store parking lot.
August 11	Minneapolis (3)	Minnesota	1	6	7	One person was killed and six others were injured in the backyard of a house.
August 11	Philadelphia (14)	Pennsylvania	3	1	4	Three people were killed and one person was injured at a playground in North Philadelphia.
August 10	Marysville	Washington	2	2	4	In the early morning a man killed another at an apartment complex. Three hours later, while on the run the shooter entered a family home killed a woman and injured two other adults. Two children in the home at the time were uninjured.
August 9	Nunda Township	Illinois	4	1	5	A man fatally shot three women and injured another in a domestic violence incident before committing suicide.
August 9	Pittsburgh (3)	Pennsylvania	0	5	5	After being ejected from a bar by its bouncers, a man returned and was injured in a shootout along with four others.
August 6	Philadelphia (13)	Pennsylvania	0	5	5	Five teens were injured at the Helen G. Sturgis Playground in the East Oak Lane neighborhood of North Philadelphia.
August 6	Murillo	Texas	0	7	7	Police found seven people injured at the El Antro Nightclub.
August 5	Lafayette	Louisiana	1	5	6	A child was killed, and another and an adult wounded. Responding officers fired at the suspect who wounded two officers, and was also wounded.
August 5	Kansas City (5)	Missouri	0	4	4	Four men were injured shortly before midnight, the suspect was arrested by responding police.
August 5	Washington (6)	District of Columbia	3	4	7	Three people were killed and four were injured in the Anacostia neighborhood of Southeast DC.
August 3	Los Angeles (8)	California	0	4	4	Four people were injured in a city event in South Los Angeles.
August 2	Pine Bluff (2)	Arkansas	0	5	5	Two teenagers and three adults were wounded.
July 31	Columbus (2)	Mississippi	0	4	4	Four people were injured when an altercation between people in two vehicles in the parking lot of Baptist Memorial Hospital-Golden Triangle escalated.
July 30	Muncie	Indiana	1	18	19	One person was killed, 18 wounded/injured, five of them airlifted to Indianapolis with one in critical condition after being struck by an automobile at a large block party on the city's south-east side.
July 30	Lansing (3)	Michigan	0	5	5	Five people were injured, two critically, in a shopping center parking lot.
July 28	Tampa (1)	Florida	1	3	4	One person was killed and three others injured.
July 28	Fort Lauderdale (2)	Florida	0	4	4	Four people were injured after an argument over a game of dominoes escalated.
July 28	Ford Heights	Illinois	1	4	5	One person was killed and four people were injured.
July 28	Seattle (2)	Washington	0	5	5	Five people were injured in a Safeway parking lot in the Rainier Beach neighborhood.
July 25	Pittsburgh (2)	Pennsylvania	0	5	5	Five juveniles injured.
July 24	Tulsa (3)	Oklahoma	3	1	4	Three women were killed and a baby was injured in an apartment by an ex-boyfriend.
July 24	New York City (7)	New York	1	3	4	One person was killed and three more were injured in the Tremont section of the Bronx.
July 23	East Lake-Orient Park	Florida	0	5	5	Five people were injured at a private party in a bar.
July 23	Seattle (1)	Washington	1	3	4	One person was killed and three were injured at an illegal street race in the Capitol Hill neighborhood.
July 23	Dallas (9)	Texas	1	3	4	One person was killed and three were injured in Northwest Dallas when a person in a vehicle fired at the group and fled.
July 23	Birmingham (2)	Alabama	0	4	4	Four men were injured at a nightclub.
July 23	Houston (9)	Texas	1	4	5	One person was killed and four injured at a nightclub in Southeast Houston.
July 22	Houston (8)	Texas	1	4	5	A pregnant woman was killed and four additional people including the two shooters were injured at the Margaret Jenkins Park in Southeast Houston.
July 22	Eastover	North Carolina	1	3	4	A man shot and injured three people. The shooter was killed in Eastover.
July 22	Chicago (16)	Illinois	1	4	5	A man was killed and four more were wounded in North Lawndale.
July 22	Glendale	Arizona	0	4	4	Four people were injured after overnight shooting at Westgate.
July 22	Memphis (11)	Tennessee	1	4	5	One person was killed and four others were injured, including a child, in the Parkway Village neighborhood.
July 21	Marrero	Louisiana	1	3	4	One person was killed and three more injured.
July 20	Greensboro (3)	North Carolina	1	3	4	One man was killed and three other injured.
July 20	Verdigris	Oklahoma	4	0	4	After a three-hour standoff with police, a woman and her three children were found dead in a possible murder-suicide.
July 19	Houston (7)	Texas	2	2	4	Two men were killed and two others injured.
July 18	Philadelphia (12)	Pennsylvania	0	5	5	Five people, including a teenage boy, were injured while attending a vigil for a homicide victim.
July 17	Columbia (2)	South Carolina	1	3	4	A 17-year-old male was killed and three more were injured.
July 17	Memphis (10)	Tennessee	2	2	4	Two people were killed and two others were injured after an argument escalated at an apartment complex near Memphis International Airport.
July 16	Chicago (15)	Illinois	1	4	5	One person was killed and four others injured in a driveby shooting in the West Garfield Park neighborhood.
July 16	Dallas (8)	Texas	1	4	5	A woman was killed and four others injured.
July 15	Hartford (2)	Connecticut	2	2	4	Two people, including a teenage girl, were killed and two people were wounded after a shootout following a home invasion and robbery.
July 15	Memphis (9)	Tennessee	1	4	5	One person was killed and four were injured in the Raleigh neighborhood. Police are looking for two suspects.
July 15	Hampton	Georgia	5	3	8	Three men and one woman were killed in the Dogwood Lakes subdivision. The suspect was killed in a shootout with police the following day, with three other officers being wounded.
July 15	Munhall	Pennsylvania	1	3	4	A man was killed and three others wounded at a local bar in the early morning.
July 14	Fargo	North Dakota	2	3	5	2023 shooting of Fargo police officers: A man shot at police officers responding to an unrelated traffic collision, killing one officer and wounding two more before an officer shot and killed him. In addition, a nearby woman was struck by gunfire.
July 14	Bladensburg	Maryland	0	5	5	Five people in a car were shot from another car as they left a funeral.
July 13	El Paso (3)	Texas	2	4	6	Two adults were killed and four wounded after a fight at a local bar escalated shortly after midnight.
July 13	Layhill	Maryland	0	4	4	Four people were wounded after a fight in a local restaurant escalated out into the parking lot shortly after midnight.
July 13	East St. Louis	Illinois	1	4	5	One person was killed and four wounded in the afternoon.
July 11	Dallas (7)	Texas	0	6	6	Three adults and three teenagers were wounded in the evening.
July 11	New York City (6)	New York	0	4	4	Four people were injured near St. James Park in the Fordham neighborhood in the Bronx.
July 9	Amarillo	Texas	2	5	7	Two people were killed and five wounded after an argument escalated in the early morning at a private party.
July 9	Wadesboro	North Carolina	1	6	7	One man was killed and six injured after an early morning shooting in a convenience store parking lot, during a block party.
July 9	Dubuque	Iowa	1	3	4	One person was killed and three wounded in the early morning after a disturbance between two groups.
July 9	Cleveland (5)	Ohio	0	9	9	Nine people were wounded in the early morning outside a local bar.
July 9	Montgomery (2)	Alabama	1	6	7	A teenager was found deceased and six others wounded by responding police. Two suspects were arrested shortly after.
July 8	New York City (5)	New York	1	3	4	A shooter killed one individual and wounded three others in multiple shootings across Queens and Brooklyn, in about 40 minutes.
July 8	Indio	California	1	3	4	Shortly after midnight responding officers found a man killed and three others wounded at a house party.
July 8	Gary	Indiana	1	3	4	A man was killed and three others wounded in the early morning at local bar.
July 8	Baltimore (10)	Maryland	2	2	4	Two people were killed and two others were injured in East Baltimore after an argument escalated.
July 8	Dallas (6)	Texas	1	3	4	A teenager was killed, and one adult and two other teenagers wounded at a large party.
July 7	Chicago (14)	Illinois	0	5	5	Five people were injured in the Rogers Park neighborhood in a shootout involving two vehicles after an argument escalated.
July 7	El Paso (2)	Texas	0	8	8	Eight people were wounded when a shooter opened fire, at a large high school house party in Upper Valley. An argument has escalated over uninvited guests.
July 5	Fort Lauderdale (1)	Florida	0	5	5	Three adults and two juveniles were wounded after two groups confronted each other in an apartment complex courtyard.
July 5	Lansing (2)	Michigan	0	4	4	Four people were shot in the early morning, near South Washington Square.
July 5	Wicomico County	Maryland	1	6	7	A teenager was killed and six other people injured at a block party near Salisbury.
July 5	Chicago (13)	Illinois	1	4	5	A man was killed and four others wounded at a large gathering in Englewood.
July 5	Cleveland (4)	Ohio	2	2	4	Shortly after midnight two adults were killed and two wounded, after a large crowd had gathered to light fireworks.
July 5	Washington (5)	District of Columbia	0	9	9	Nine people, including two children, were wounded on a city street during Independence Day celebrations.
July 5	Boston (1)	Massachusetts	0	5	5	Five people were wounded in the Mattapan neighborhood.
July 5	Paterson (2)	New Jersey	2	3	5	Responding officers found a deceased adult and teenager, with three other victims arriving at local hospitals.
July 5	Flint	Michigan	0	4	4	Four adults were wounded in and around a parked vehicle after shooters opened fire at the car in the afternoon.
July 4	Edgewood	Maryland	0	4	4	Two adults and two teenagers were wounded after a physical altercation escalated. All of the wounded were believed to be gang members or associates.
July 4	Akron	Ohio	0	4	4	Four teenagers were wounded in the early morning at a party near Mason Elementary School.
July 4	Hayward	California	0	6	6	Six people were shot after an evening argument escalated. One of the wounded was identified as a suspect and arrested after he was treated.
July 4	Shreveport (6)	Louisiana	4	7	11	Four were killed and seven others wounded in a shootout at an Independence Day gathering.
July 4	Lansing (1)	Michigan	0	5	5	Five men were injured in the early morning after an altercation escalated.
July 3	Charlotte (2)	North Carolina	0	4	4	Three adults and a teenager were wounded in a Derita neighborhood home.
July 3	Martin County	Minnesota	0	4	4	Four people were wounded after a shooting erupted at a large gathering shortly before midnight.
July 3	Philadelphia (11)	Pennsylvania	5	2	7	2023 Kingsessing shooting: A local man killed five people, including a teenager, and injured two others in the Kingsessing section of Southwest Philadelphia.
July 3	Fort Worth (3)	Texas	0	5	5	Five people were wounded after two people opened fire, after a fight started at a home. At least one of the wounded was believed to be a shooter.
July 3	Fort Worth (2)	Texas	3	8	11	Three were killed and eight were wounded in a parking lot in the Como neighborhood following a festival.
July 3	Indianapolis (5)	Indiana	1	3	4	One person was killed and three wounded by gunfire at a block party.
July 3	Michigan City	Indiana	0	4	4	Four young adults were wounded after a shooting at a large gathering.
July 3	St. Ann	Missouri	3	1	4	A mother and her two children were killed and the suspect was found with a self-inflicted injury.
July 2	Baltimore (9)	Maryland	2	28	30	2023 Baltimore shooting: Two people were killed and 28 people were injured in South Baltimore.
July 2	New York City (4)	New York	0	4	4	Four people including a 12-year-old child were shot in Mount Hope.
July 2	Wichita	Kansas	0	7	7	Seven people were injured at a night club.
July 1	Tulsa (2)	Oklahoma	0	4	4	Four people were injured in a shootout after a concert.
June 30	Florin	California	0	4	4	Four people were injured near a bar.
June 30	Chicago (13)	Illinois	1	3	4	One person was killed and three others were injured in a drive-by shooting in the Chicago Lawn neighborhood on the Southwest Side.
June 29	Odessa	Texas	1	4	5	One person was killed and four more people injured in an apartment.
June 28	Greensboro (2) and Kernersville	North Carolina	3	1	4	Three people were killed and one other injured in connected incidents.
June 26	Ypsilanti Township	Michigan	2	2	4	Two young men were killed outside an apartment building, and two more teenagers were injured.
June 25	Kansas City (4)	Missouri	3	6	9	Three were killed and six were injured outside an illegal after-hours shop.
June 25	Cincinnati (2)	Ohio	0	4	4	Four were injured by gunfire.
June 25	Missouri City	Texas	1	3	4	A teenager was killed and three others were injured after a fight outside a business.
June 25	Marlow Heights	Maryland	0	4	4	Four were injured at 1:40 in the morning.
June 25	Indianapolis (4)	Indiana	3	1	4	Three were killed and one other was injured in the Broad Ripple Village district. The shooting led Broad Ripple Village to request a gun ban on weekends.
June 24	Union County	South Carolina	0	4	4	Four were injured at a party.
June 24	Asheboro	North Carolina	0	4	4	Four were injured.
June 24	Beaumont	Texas	0	5	5	A fight resulted in five being wounded.
June 24	Saginaw	Michigan	2	15	17	Two were killed and fifteen others were injured at a late night party.
June 24	Pine Hills (2)	Florida	2	2	4	Two people were killed and two were wounded at a banquet hall.
June 21	Fort Worth (1)	Texas	1	3	4	One person was killed and three injured at an apartment complex.
June 20	Pontiac	Michigan	1	3	4	One man was killed and three more people were injured.
June 19	Chicago (12)	Illinois	1	3	4	A 20-year-old male was killed and three others injured in a drive-by shooting in South Chicago.
June 19	Milwaukee (4)	Wisconsin	0	4	4	Two alleged shooters and four others people were injured right after the Juneteenth celebration.
June 18	Detroit (4)	Michigan	0	4	4	Four teenagers were shot in Roselawn, the West Side.
June 18	Kellogg	Idaho	4	0	4	Four family members were killed by a suspected neighbor.
June 18	Greenville (1)	North Carolina	1	5	6	One person was fatally shot and five more were injured in a fight that led to the shooting.
June 18	DeKalb County (2)	Georgia	0	5	5	Five people were injured in shooting outside a nightclub.
June 18	Chicago (11)	Illinois	2	3	5	Two people were killed and three others were injured in drive-by at South Side park.
June 18	Chicago (10)	Illinois	1	3	4	One person killed and three others were wounded after a shooting at an Austin garage.
June 18	DuPage County	Illinois	1	22	23	A person was killed and 22 were injured at a Juneteenth celebration in unincorporated Downers Grove Township, DuPage County.
June 18	St. Louis (4)	Missouri	1	9	10	A teenager was killed and nine others were injured overnight.
June 17	La Crosse	Wisconsin	0	6	6	Downtown drive-by shooting left at least six people injured.
June 17	Philadelphia (10)	Pennsylvania	0	5	5	Five people injured in the Point Breeze neighborhood.
June 17	Alexandria	Louisiana	1	3	4	One person killed and three injured in night shooting. Suspect was fatally shot by law enforcement in Pineville.
June 17	Charlotte (1)	North Carolina	1	3	4	One person dead and three others were injured.
June 17	Winston-Salem (2)	North Carolina	0	4	4	Four people were injured.
June 17	Indianapolis (3)	Indiana	0	4	4	Four people were injured in overnight shooting on city's west side.
June 17	Grant County	Washington	2	4	6	A man fired into a crowd at a campground near the Gorge Amphitheatre, killing two and wounding another two. The suspect continued to randomly fire into the crowd before being arrested.
June 17	Carson	California	0	8	8	Eight people ages 16–24 were struck by gunfire outside a house party.
June 17	Cleveland (3)	Ohio	0	4	4	Four people were shot outside a deli in the Union-Miles neighborhood.
June 17	Chicago (9)	Illinois	0	5	5	Five people were injured in the Lincoln Park neighborhood.
June 16	Baltimore (8)	Maryland	0	6	6	Six people injured at busy intersection in North Baltimore.
June 16	Clifton	New Jersey	0	4	4	Four people were shot and one seriously wounded when gunfire erupted at a nightclub.
June 15	Greenville	South Carolina	0	4	4	Four teenagers were injured.
June 15	Sequatchie	Tennessee	6	1	7	A man killed five family members at a home before setting the house on fire before killing himself.
June 15	Monroe Township	Ohio	3	1	4	A man allegedly killed his three children and wounded his wife at their home.
June 14	Tulsa (1)	Oklahoma	1	3	4	One person was killed and three others were injured.
June 13	Denver (3)	Colorado	0	10	10	Ten people were shot in Downtown Denver after the Denver Nuggets won the NBA Championship.
June 11	Syracuse (2)	New York	0	4	4	From thirteen people who were attacked and injured, four people were wounded due to gunshots.
June 11	Champaign	Illinois	0	4	4	Gunshot injuries reported alongside of multiple traffic collisions that led to four injuries due to shooting and two because of collisions.
June 11	Barrett	Texas	1	4	5	Five people were shot and one person found dead at Barrett Station Evergreen Cemetery in Melville.
June 11	Houston (6)	Texas	0	6	6	Six people were injured outside of a Houston nightclub.
June 11	Annapolis	Maryland	3	4	7	2023 Annapolis shooting: Three people were killed and four injured outside a residence.
June 11	Antioch	California	1	6	7	A teenage girl was killed and six other people were injured at a birthday party.
June 10	Hattiesburg	Mississippi	0	4	4	A shooting left four people wounded, one critically injured.
June 10	Benton City	Washington	1	5	6	One person killed and five others were injured at a party.
June 10	Oak Park	Illinois	0	4	4	Four people were injured during a funeral procession.
June 9	Jeannette	Pennsylvania	1	4	5	A woman died and four others were injured.
June 9	San Francisco (3)	California	0	9	9	Nine people were shot in a drive-by shooting in the Mission District.
June 8	North Charleston	South Carolina	1	3	4	One person was killed and three others were injured overnight.
June 7	Sacramento (2)	California	0	7	7	Seven people were shot in the Del Paso Heights area.
June 6	Reedley	California	2	2	4	A felon released from prison the previously day shot at random victims, killing a man and wounding two others before he was killed by police.
June 6	Richmond	Virginia	2	5	7	2023 Richmond shooting: Two people were killed and seventeen others were injured at Altria Theater during a graduation ceremony for Huguenot High School. In addition two were injured by falls, one person was hit by a car, and three people were hospitalized for anxiety. Two people were arrested.
June 5	Jackson	Mississippi	1	4	5	One person was killed and four were injured at a nightclub.
June 4	Goulding	Florida	1	4	5	One person was killed and four others were injured at a residence.
June 4	Boone County	Missouri	2	4	6	Two teenagers were killed and four others were injured during a party.
June 4	Dayton (2)	Ohio	1	4	5	One man was killed and four others are hurt after a shooting.
June 4	Albuquerque	New Mexico	3	1	4	Dispatched police found three people deceased and one injured.
June 4	Sunnyvale	Texas	1	4	5	A masked man approached a vehicle and shot a woman, her brother, and his three children. The woman was killed, while her brother and his children were injured.
June 4	Chicago (8)	Illinois	1	6	7	A woman was killed, and five adults and one teenager were injured in the Austin neighborhood, after a verbal argument at an early morning memorial.
June 3	Portland	Oregon	0	4	4	Four adults were wounded in Northeast Portland in the evening.
June 2	Memphis (8)	Tennessee	0	4	4	Four people were wounded shortly before midnight in Whitehaven, by at least one shooter.
June 2	San Antonio (3)	Texas	1	3	4	A teen was killed with three others injured in a drive-by shooting within an apartment complex.
May 31	Cleveland (2)	Ohio	1	3	4	One person was killed and three were injured in the Forest Hills neighborhood.
May 31	Cincinnati (1)	Ohio	0	4	4	Four people were injured including two teenagers in Over-the-Rhine neighborhood.
May 31	Fayetteville (2)	North Carolina	2	2	4	Two people were killed and two others injured in a quadruple shooting.
May 29	Lebanon	Pennsylvania	3	1	4	A man and two children were killed and another person wounded in an attack targeting the man.
May 29	Columbus (5)	Ohio	0	7	7	Seven people, including two juveniles, were injured at a party.
May 29	Peoria (1)	Illinois	0	4	4	Four people were shot and injured in a car.
May 29	Hollywood	South Carolina	1	5	6	One person was killed and five were injured.
May 29	Syracuse (1)	New York	1	3	4	One person died and three people were injured.
May 29	Hollywood	Florida	0	9	9	Several people were injured on Hollywood Beach on Memorial Day.
May 28	San Juan (2)	Puerto Rico	2	13	15	Several assailants fired at a group of people outside a bar during a birthday party, killing two men and wounding several others. Police said the assailants were likely targeting one of the deceased.
May 28	Dayton (1)	Ohio	1	3	4	One person killed and three injured.
May 28	Chester	Pennsylvania	0	8	8	A shooting outside Subaru Park left eight people injured.
May 28	Philadelphia (9)	Pennsylvania	1	3	4	A 66-year-old man was killed and three teenagers were injured in the Frankford neighborhood.
May 28	Harrisburg	Pennsylvania	0	4	4	Four people were injured.
May 28	Hazlehurst	Mississippi	0	5	5	Five people were injured in at a house party shooting.
May 28	Memphis (7)	Tennessee	0	4	4	Four people were injured in a Southwest shooting.
May 27	Chicago (7)	Illinois	1	3	4	One person was killed and three people were injured in a drive-by shooting.
May 27	Moreno Valley (2)	California	0	4	4	At least four people shot and wounded.
May 27	Marianna	Arkansas	1	4	5	One person was killed and four others were injured in an O'Reilly Auto Parts parking lot.
May 27	Red River	New Mexico	3	5	8	Three were killed and five were injured at an annual motorcycle rally.
May 26	Dale City	Virginia	2	2	4	Two people were killed and two others were injured inside a home.
May 26	Baltimore (7)	Maryland	0	5	5	Five people were injured.
May 26	Country Club Estates	Georgia	0	5	5	Five people were injured in the Fairway Oaks neighborhood.
May 26	Columbus (1)	Mississippi	1	4	5	A shooting inside a sports bar left one person dead and four others injured.
May 26	Mesa	Arizona	4	1	5	Four people dead and one person injured.
May 26	Milwaukee (3)	Wisconsin	0	4	4	Four teenage girls were injured.
May 25	Baltimore (6)	Maryland	0	4	4	Four people were injured.
May 23	Nash	Texas	4	0	4	Four family members were killed by a teenage relative.
May 22	Columbus	Indiana	0	4	4	Four people were injured at a park.
May 22	Columbia	Tennessee	1	4	5	A 19-year-old was killed and four people were injured in a shootout.
May 21	Clarksdale	Mississippi	0	14	14	Fourteen people were injured after a concert.
May 21	Kent	Washington	0	5	5	Five people were injured at a street race.
May 21	Lafourche Parish	Louisiana	0	9	9	Nine people were injured at a party.
May 21	Kansas City (3)	Missouri	3	2	5	Three people were killed and two others were injured at the Klymax Lounge.
May 20	Los Angeles (7)	California	0	4	4	Four people were injured in the Westlake District.
May 20	Thomson	Georgia	0	4	4	Four people were injured at a party.
May 20	Louisville (4)	Kentucky	0	4	4	Three teens and one adult woman injured in the Portland neighborhood.
May 20	New Orleans (6)	Louisiana	2	2	4	Two people were killed and two others were injured in a car.
May 18	Kansas City (2)	Kansas	2	2	4	Two people were killed and two others wounded at a residence.
May 18	San Antonio (2)	Texas	1	3	4	One person was killed and three others injured at a nightclub on the Northwest Side.
May 16	San Antonio (1)	Texas	0	4	4	Four people were injured in drive-by shooting.
May 15	Farmington	New Mexico	4	6	10	2023 Farmington, New Mexico shooting: Three people were killed and several others, including two police officers, were injured. The 18-year-old suspect was killed by police.
May 14	Shreveport (5)	Louisiana	0	4	4	One woman and three men were injured in a sports bar.
May 14	Anderson	Indiana	0	6	6	Six people were injured near State Road 32.
May 14	Montgomery (1)	Alabama	1	3	4	One person was killed and three others injured.
May 14	Hazleton	Pennsylvania	0	4	4	Four men between the ages of 19 and 22 years old were injured.
May 13	Dallas (5)	Texas	1	3	4	Three people were wounded during a shootout, and a bystander driving her daughter to get ready for prom was killed.
May 13	Augusta	Georgia	2	4	6	Two people were killed and three injured after an argument at a motorcycle gathering.
May 13	Manchester	New Hampshire	0	4	4	Four people were injured at a graduation party.
May 13	Shreveport (4)	Louisiana	0	4	4	Four people were injured.
May 13	Sacramento (1)	California	0	4	4	Four people were wounded at an intersection, including a one-year-old girl and ten-year-old boy.
May 13	Yuma	Arizona	2	5	7	Two people were killed and five wounded at a gathering.
May 13	Louisville (3)	Kentucky	1	4	5	Four people were wounded after a dispute at a restaurant spilled into the street in Downtown Louisville. A fifth person was found shot nearby, and he died in a hospital.
May 12	Maryland City	Maryland	3	1	4	Three adults were killed and a 10-year-old boy was injured after a shooting inside a home.
May 11	Chicago (6)	Illinois	2	3	5	Two people were killed and three others were injured in Englewood.
May 11	Indianapolis (2)	Indiana	1	3	4	One person was killed and at least three people were injured at a Steak 'n Shake.
May 11	Philadelphia (8)	Pennsylvania	1	3	4	A 17-year-old boy was killed and two other teens and a seven-year-old were injured in Logan.
May 10	Denver (2)	Colorado	1	4	5	One person was killed and four others were injured at an apartment complex.
May 7	Thornton	California	1	3	4	A drive-by shooting at a neighborhood gathering killed one person and wounded three.
May 7	St. Louis (3)	Missouri	2	2	4	Two teens were killed and two others were wounded.
May 7	Frostburg	Maryland	1	3	4	One man was killed and four Frostburg State University students were wounded at an off-campus residence.
May 7	Columbia	Missouri	1	4	5	A man opened fire in the morning, killing one person. Four others were injured, including the suspect.
May 7	Redwood City	California	0	5	5	Four men and one 16-year-old were injured while drinking on a sidewalk.
May 7	Newark (3)	New Jersey	1	3	4	One person was killed and three others wounded early in the morning.
May 7	Adelanto	California	2	5	7	A shooter opened fire at a house party early in the morning, killing two and wounding five.
May 6	Tunica County	Mississippi	0	4	4	Four people were injured after being shot at in an apartment in the evening.
May 6	Columbus (4)	Ohio	2	3	5	One person was killed and three others injured in South Linden. The shooter committed suicide.
May 6	Allen	Texas	9	7	16	Allen, Texas mall shooting: A Dallas man opened fire at Allen Premium Outlets mall, killing eight people and injuring seven others before being killed by police.
May 6	Chico	California	1	5	6	A teenage girl was killed and five others wounded at a party near the California State University, Chico campus.
May 6	Columbus (3)	Ohio	0	10	10	A person opened fire early in the morning, injuring 10 people on the street. The suspect was struck by gunfire as well and was arrested.
May 5	San Diego	California	1	3	4	A man was killed and three wounded in a drive-by shooting outside a recreation center.
May 5	Natchez	Mississippi	2	2	4	Two people were killed and at least two others injured in a parking lot.
May 5	Vicksburg	Mississippi	0	4	4	Four people were injured during a shooting at Jacques’ Bar (a night club).
May 5	St. Louis (2)	Missouri	2	2	4	Two people were killed and two injured on Cherokee Street.
May 5	Ocean Springs	Mississippi	1	6	7	One person was killed and six wounded at a restaurant during a Cinco de Mayo party.
May 5	Bastrop	Louisiana	2	2	4	Two juveniles were killed and another two injured around midnight.
May 3	Chicago (5)	Illinois	0	4	4	Four people were injured in a block-long incident on the South Side.
May 3	Newark (2)	New Jersey	3	1	4	A man shot and killed another man and an 8-year-old child and wounded a woman inside a home. Officers encountered the shooter fleeing the scene and shot and killed him.
May 3	Atlanta (2)	Georgia	1	4	5	2023 Atlanta shooting: One woman was killed and four other women were injured after someone fired inside a Northside Hospital facility in Midtown Atlanta. A male suspect was arrested eight hours later.
May 2	DeKalb County (1)	Georgia	2	2	4	Two people were killed and two others injured in a triple shooting in DeKalb County.
May 2	Lake Wales	Florida	5	0	5	A man killed a woman and her three children at an apartment. Following a manhunt the suspect was killed by police after a standoff at a motel.
May 1	Okmulgee County	Oklahoma	7	0	7	2023 Henryetta Killings: A registered sex offender killed his wife, her three teenage children, and two of their friends before killing himself.
April 30	Athens	Georgia	1	3	4	One man was killed and three people wounded after a dispute outside a bar.
April 30	Paducah	Kentucky	0	4	4	A shootout between two parties at an after-prom party wounded four bystanders. Two adults and two juveniles were arrested in connection with the shooting.
April 30	Lawrence	Massachusetts	1	5	6	A teenager was killed and five injured at a house party.
April 30	Mojave	California	4	0	4	Four people were killed at a remote home.
April 30	Bay St. Louis	Mississippi	2	4	6	Two teenagers were killed and four others were injured at a house party. The suspect was arrested at his home in Pass Christian.
April 29	Auburn	Washington	0	4	4	Four people, a girl, and three men were wounded at an illegal street racing event following a fight.
April 29	Columbia (1)	South Carolina	0	11 (Note: Nine injured by gunfire)	11	Nine people were injured by gunfire at a park. In addition, a woman was struck by a vehicle while fleeing the scene and another person suffered a hand injury.
April 28	Philadelphia (7)	Pennsylvania	3	1	4	Three people were killed and a fourth wounded at a home in the Lawncrest neighborhood. Two teenagers were arrested.
April 28	San Jacinto County	Texas	5	0	5	2023 Cleveland, Texas shooting: Five Honduran people including a nine-year-old were killed outside Cleveland, Texas. After a four-day-long manhunt, the suspect was captured 17 miles (27 km) away in Cut and Shoot, Texas on May 2.
April 23	San Francisco (2)	California	1	4	5	One person was killed and four were injured in the North Beach neighborhood.
April 23	Jasper County	Texas	0	11	11	Eleven were injured at an after-prom party north of Jasper. Four juveniles from the neighboring town of Newton were arrested in connection with the incident, with two of them being found 35 miles (56 km) away in DeRidder, Louisiana. Police say that more arrests were expected to come.
April 22	Winston-Salem (1)	North Carolina	1	4	5	One woman was killed and four people injured at a large outdoor party.
April 21	Washington (4)	District of Columbia	0	8	8	In Southeast DC, police found seven men injured, and later found a girl injured in the same neighborhood, which they said may be related.
April 21	Rockmart	Georgia	0	4	4	Four people were injured at an intersection.
April 20	Hartford (1)	Connecticut	1	3	4	Three people were injured in a drive-by shooting, and a 12-year-old girl was killed.
April 18	Bowdoin and Yarmouth	Maine	4	3	7	2023 Bowdoin–Yarmouth shootings: After four people were killed in a home in Bowdoin, shots were fired at vehicles along Interstate 295 in Yarmouth, wounding three people. A suspect was taken into custody.
April 17	Baltimore (5)	Maryland	0	4	4	Four people were injured in a shootout on Charles Street.
April 17	Houston (5)	Texas	1	3	4	A man was injured in a dispute in with another man at a bus stop, as well as a bystander. Another person then exited a nearby restaurant before killing the first suspect, accidentally hitting a rideshare driver.
April 16	Christiansted	United States Virgin Islands	2	4	6	A man was killed and five other people wounded in a shooting as patrons left a nightclub. A second man later died of his injuries.
April 16	Māili	Hawaii	2	3	5	A man and woman were killed and three others injured at an illegal cockfight. Two people were arrested.
April 16	Biloxi	Mississippi	0	5	5	Five people were injured, one a police officer, near a Surf Style store on U.S. 90.
April 15	Dadeville	Alabama	4	32	36	2023 Dadeville shooting: Four were killed and thirty-two were injured at a 16th birthday party at the Mahogany Masterpiece Dance Studio after an argument escalated.
April 15	Louisville (2)	Kentucky	2	4	6	Two people were killed and four were injured at Chickasaw Park.
April 15	Los Angeles (6)	California	1	3	4	One man was killed and three men were injured outside an ice cream shop in the Northridge neighborhood.
April 15	Detroit (3)	Michigan	1	3	4	One person was killed and three injured in Downtown Detroit.
April 14	Kansas City (2)	Missouri	1	4	5	One person was killed and four injured at a gas station.
April 13	New York City (3)	New York	0	4	4	Three women and a 28-year-old man were injured outside a restaurant in Soundview, Bronx.
April 13	Houston (4)	Texas	0	4	4	Four people were injured in Southeast Houston in an attempted robbery at a gas station.
April 13	Detroit (2)	Michigan	0	5	5	Five people were injured, including two teenagers and at least one of the suspected shooters, on the west side following a shootout. According to police the shootout occurred after a pizza was delivered to the wrong house, which the occupants ate. Police said the people who ordered the pizza confronted those who ate it, leading to the shooting.
April 13	Bridgeport	Connecticut	0	4	4	Four people were injured at Seaside Park. Three people were arrested.
April 12	Toledo	Ohio	0	6	6	Six people were injured at a large gathering at Smith Park.
April 12	Fort Wayne	Indiana	1	3	4	One man was killed and three men were injured outside an apartment complex.
April 12	Goldsboro	North Carolina	1	5	6	One teenage girl was killed and five other teenagers were injured near a Piggly Wiggly store.
April 12	Trenton (2)	New Jersey	0	4	4	Four people were injured in a drive-by at an intersection.
April 11	Washington (3)	District of Columbia	1	3	4	One person was killed and three injured at a funeral home in Northeast DC.
April 10	Louisville (1)	Kentucky	6	8	14	2023 Louisville shooting: Five people were killed and eight injured at an Old National Bank branch in Downtown Louisville. The suspect, a former employee at the bank who had recently been terminated, was killed by police.
April 10	Guayama	Puerto Rico	3	2	5	Three people were killed and two wounded at a corner store.
April 9	Orlando (1)	Florida	3	2	5	Three people were killed and two wounded after a shooting during an Easter egg hunt at a park.
April 8	Houston (3)	Texas	0	4	4	Four people injured in the parking lot of The Selena apartment complex in Eastern Harris County.
April 7	Isle of Palms	South Carolina	0	6	6	Six people, including teens and adults, were injured on a beach near a condo.
April 7	New Orleans (5)	Louisiana	0	4	4	Two women and two children were injured on Interstate 10. The boy was critically wounded.
April 7	Park Forest	Illinois	1	3	4	One person killed at the scene, and three others injured, at a family gathering.
April 6	Philadelphia (6)	Pennsylvania	0	4	4	A woman was placed in critical condition and three others were injured in the Nicetown–Tioga neighborhood of North Philadelphia.
April 5	Virginia Beach	Virginia	0	4	4	Four people were injured.
April 5	Kansas City (1)	Kansas	0	6	6	Three police officers and three suspects were injured during a shootout after an undercover fentanyl investigation.
April 4	Philadelphia (5)	Pennsylvania	1	4	5	A man was killed and four others injured in the Kensington neighborhood.
April 3	Jackson	Tennessee	0	4	4	Police found five people in a car, four of them injured.
April 3	Atlanta (1)	Georgia	1	3	4	A man died at the Grady Hospital and three others injured at the Flipper Temple Apartments complex near the Westside Atlanta Charter School.
April 3	Pueblo	Colorado	1	3	4	A teenager was killed and three women were injured.
April 2	Fayetteville (1)	North Carolina	1	4	5	Four men were injured and one killed at the EV Lounge hookah bar in a shopping center.
April 2	Washington (2)	District of Columbia	0	4	4	Four men were injured on Martin Luther King Jr. Avenue in Southeast DC.
April 2	Moreno Valley (1)	California	0	4	4	Two men and two boys were injured.
April 1	Oklahoma City (2)	Oklahoma	3	3	6	Three people were killed and three others injured at a bar in southwest Oklahoma City following a shootout between biker gangs.
April 1	Los Angeles (5)	California	1	3	4	One person was killed and three injured in a Trader Joe's parking lot in West Hills.
April 1	Baltimore (4)	Maryland	3	1	4	Three were killed and one injured in Northeast Baltimore.
March 29	Memphis (6)	Tennessee	2	5	7	Two people were killed and five were injured outside a Hickory Hill restaurant. One man was found dead at the scene and the other died at a hospital.
March 27	Nashville	Tennessee	7	1	8	2023 Nashville school shooting: Six people were killed, including three children, and one injured at Covenant School in the Green Hills neighborhood. The perpetrator, a 28-year-old ex-student, was also killed a short time later.
March 27	Milwaukee (2)	Wisconsin	0	5	5	Five people were injured outside the Prime Social restaurant and bar.
March 26	Philadelphia (4)	Pennsylvania	2	2	4	Two were killed and two others injured in North Philadelphia.
March 26	Little Rock (1)	Arkansas	2	5	7	Two people died and five more were wounded and hospitalized.
March 26	Hempstead	New York	0	4	4	Four men were injured near a child's birthday party.
March 26	Minden	Louisiana	0	4	4	Four shot during a family event at Ewell Park Recreation Center.
March 26	Brooklyn Center	Minnesota	0	6	6	Six people, all of whom were under the age of 18, sustained non-life-threatening injuries after more than 50 gunshot rounds were fired in the parking lot of a Girl Scouts headquarters building.
March 25	Williamston	North Carolina	0	5	5	Five people were shot during a party in a public housing development.
March 25	Shreveport (3)	Louisiana	1	5	6	One was killed and five were injured when multiple people got out of an SUV and randomly shot at pedestrians.
March 23	Baltimore (3)	Maryland	2	6	8	Two men were killed and six other people were injured including a teenager, in West Baltimore.
March 21	Trenton (1)	New Jersey	0	4	4	Four people were injured in a drive-by shooting, including a 15-year-old boy.
March 21	Sumter	South Carolina	5	0	5	A perpetrator killed three children and an adult at a home before killing himself.
March 20	Milwaukee (1)	Wisconsin	1	5	6	A teenage boy was killed and five women were injured.
March 18	Columbus (2)	Ohio	2	4	6	Two people were killed and four others injured inside Tha Plug nightclub.
March 18	Chicago (4)	Illinois	0	4	4	Three men opened fire into a restaurant and injured three men and a woman in South Shore.
March 18	Dallas (4)	Texas	0	4	4	Four people were hospitalized from a shooting at an intersection.
March 15	Modesto	California	2	2	4	Two men were killed and two others injured in a residential shooting.
March 14	Birmingham (1) and St. Clair County	Alabama	4	0	4	A man killed two people in Birmingham, before killing a man and woman inside a home in St. Clair County. The suspect surrendered, alerted police and confessed to killing the four people.
March 13	Lubbock	Texas	0	4	4	Four people were injured in south Lubbock.
March 12	Dallas (3)	Texas	4	0	4	Two men and two women were killed in an apartment complex in Northwest Dallas. Two suspects were taken into custody.
March 10	Miami Lakes	Florida	5	0	5	Three women and two men, including the perpetrator, were killed in their home during a murder–suicide.
March 8	Los Angeles (4)	California	1	3	4	A career criminal opened fire on police officers in the Lincoln Heights neighborhood, injuring three, before dying.
March 8	Pine Bluff (1)	Arkansas	2	2	4	Two people were killed and two others were injured in a parked car in front of an apartment complex.
March 7	Memphis (5)	Tennessee	0	4	4	Four people were injured, two critically, in south Memphis.
March 6	Memphis (4)	Tennessee	2	2	4	Two men were killed and two other people were critically injured at an apartment during a domestic incident.
March 6	La Riviera	California	2	2	4	Two people were killed and two others injured in the early morning at a residential home. Two others in the home were not wounded.
March 5	Lake City	Florida	0	4	4	Four men were wounded shortly before noon, the same suspect reportedly opened fire again after 30 minutes but no one else was wounded.
March 5	Bolingbrook	Illinois	3	1	4	An adult and two teenagers were killed in an apparent home invasion, with a second adult wounded. A teenager was later arrested in connection.
March 5	Shreveport (2)	Louisiana	0	4	4	Four people were injured in the parking lot of a Baptist church during a drive-by shooting.
March 4	Cape Girardeau	Missouri	0	5	5	Four victims with gunshot wounds were found by first responders at a bar, and a fifth person was later identified to be a victim of the same incident.
March 4	Douglasville	Georgia	2	6	8	Two teenagers were killed and six others were injured during a shooting at a house party.
March 4	Los Angeles (3)	California	0	5	5	Five people were injured, one critically, near a beach in the San Pedro neighborhood.
March 1	Kansas City (1)	Missouri	1	3	4	Three police officers were injured while executing a search warrant at a home. The perpetrator died of a self-inflicted gunshot wound after an 18-hour standoff.
March 1	Cocoa	Florida	4	0	4	Four people were killed in a domestic incident at their home.
February 27	New Richmond	Ohio	4	1	5	Four people were killed and one person was critically injured at a home during a murder–suicide.
February 27	Memphis (3)	Tennessee	2	2	4	Two men were killed and two others were injured during a shooting near a park in South Memphis.
February 26	Machesney Park	Illinois	0	4	4	Four people were injured, one critically, at a bar.
February 26	Pompano Beach	Florida	2	2	4	Two people were killed and two others were injured during a shooting in front of a convenience store.
February 26	Memphis (2)	Tennessee	1	4	5	One person was killed and four others were injured, two critically, during a shooting near an intersection in Southwest Memphis.
February 26	Detroit (1)	Michigan	2	2	4	Two men were killed and two other people were injured during a shooting on Detroit's East Side.
February 25	Saint Paul	Minnesota	2	3	5	Two people were killed and three others injured by gunfire after a confrontation ensued in the parking lot of a senior housing community.
February 25	West Palm Beach	Florida	1	3	4	One woman was killed and three men were injured during a shooting at an apartment.
February 23	Philadelphia (3)	Pennsylvania	0	7	7	Three suspected shooters injured seven people, including a two-year old, five teenagers and one woman near a school in the Strawberry Mansion neighborhood of North Philadelphia.
February 22	Pine Hills (1)	Florida	3	2	5	Killing of Dylan Lyons: A shooter killed a woman and fled the scene, before returning to the scene multiple hours later and opening fire, killing a Spectrum News 13 reporter and critically injuring the photographer, then killed a nine year old and injured their mother at a home before being taken into custody.
February 21	Colorado Springs (1)	Colorado	0	5	5	Five people, including a bystander, were injured outside of a gas station after a planned confrontation between two groups escalated.
February 20	Cataño	Puerto Rico	3	2	5	Two men and a boy were killed at a birthday party and two other children were wounded. Police stated the shooting may have been related to drug trafficking.
February 19	Chicago (3)	Illinois	3	3	6	Three people were killed and three others were injured along a northbound lane of I-57 in the South Side.
February 19	New Orleans (4)	Louisiana	1	4	5	One man was killed and four others were injured at an intersection along a parade route.
February 19	Linden	New Jersey	4	0	4	Two parents and their two teenage children were killed in a murder–suicide at their home.
February 19	St. Louis (1)	Missouri	0	4	4	One woman and three men were injured during a shooting in Downtown St. Louis.
February 19	Memphis (1)	Tennessee	1	10	11	Seven people were injured at a Live Lounge. Four others were shot, one fatally, at a related shooting nearby.
February 19	Indianapolis (1)	Indiana	0	5	5	Five people were injured, one critically, at a gas station.
February 18	Columbus (2)	Georgia	2	2	4	Two men were killed and two children were injured during a shooting at a motel.
February 18	Galena Park	Texas	5 (Note: Including an unborn infant)	2	7	A man sexually assaulted a 12-year-old girl before fatally shooting three teenage girls, one of whom was pregnant, during a domestic dispute. An infant and a juvenile were also hospitalized. He then committed suicide in his bedroom.
February 18	Horry County	South Carolina	0	4	4	Four people injured outside of Loris.
February 17	Columbus (1)	Georgia	0	9	9	Nine juveniles were injured at a gas station.
February 15	Baltimore (2)	Maryland	0	4	4	Four people, including two teenagers, were shot and wounded outside of a gas station in southeastern Baltimore.
February 15	El Paso (1)	Texas	1	3	4	A gunman opened fire in the Cielo Vista Mall, killing one person and injuring three others.
February 14	Buffalo	New York	0	5	5	Five people were injured after an altercation escalated.
February 14	Sweetwater	Tennessee	1	4	5	One person was killed and five others, including a child, were injured at a residence.
February 14	Pittsburgh (1)	Pennsylvania	0	4	4	Four teenagers were shot outside Westinghouse High School.
February 13	East Lansing	Michigan	4	5	9	2023 Michigan State University shooting: Eight students were shot, three fatally, at Michigan State University. The shooter, a 43-year-old man with no known ties to the school, committed suicide as he was being approached by police.
February 13	Paterson (1)	New Jersey	0	4	4	Two teenagers and two adults were shot and wounded.
February 12	Louisville	Mississippi	1	5	6	Six people were injured after multiple shooters opened fire in a parking lot.
February 10	New York City (2)	New York	0	4	4	Four people were wounded in a drive-by shooting outside a smoke shop in Coney Island, Brooklyn.
February 10	New York City (1)	New York	2	2	4	A 24-year-old man was killed and three additional people were wounded outside a Popeyes restaurant in the Crotona neighborhood of the Bronx.
February 9	Harvey	Louisiana	4	0	4	A man fatally shot three of his family members at their home before committing suicide.
February 8	Laurinburg	North Carolina	0	4	4	Three teenagers and one man were injured during a drive-by shooting.
February 8	New Orleans (3)	Louisiana	2	5 (Note: Three injured by gunfire)	7	Two adults were killed and five other people, including two children, were injured in a vehicle at an intersection in New Orleans East.
February 8	Elizabeth City	North Carolina	0	4	4	Four teenagers were injured.
February 7	San Juan (1)	Puerto Rico	1	4	5	A man was killed and four other people wounded in a drive-by shooting in the La Placita neighborhood of the Santurce barrio.
February 6	Corpus Christi	Texas	1	4	5	A 20-year-old woman was killed and four other people were injured after an argument between a group of people in two cars and a group of people at a home escalated.
February 5	Stockton	California	1	3	4	One man was killed and three others were injured in downtown Stockton.
February 5	Tucson	Arizona	1	3	4	One man was killed and three teenage boys were injured, one critically, at a house party in Southeast Tucson.
February 5	Newport	Arkansas	1	4	5	One woman was killed and three were injured after two shooters opened fire at a concert.
February 5	Falcon	Colorado	1	4	5	One person was killed and four were injured after an unknown shooter opened fire in the Meridian Ranch neighborhood. Authorities believe the shooting is linked to a carjacking from the day before.
February 4	Huntsville	Texas	2	2	4	Two people were killed and two others were critically injured after two shooters opened fire at a house party near Sam Houston State University.
February 1	Los Angeles (2)	California	0	5	5	Five people were injured in a drive-by shooting in South Los Angeles.
February 1	Texas City	Texas	0	4	4	Four people were shot, one critically, at an apartment complex. Two children were present, but were left unharmed.
January 31	Durham (2)	North Carolina	2	2	4	Four men were shot, two fatally, in a neighborhood of Durham.
January 30	Lakeland	Florida	0	11	11	Eleven people were injured, two critically, during a targeted attack at a neighborhood intersection one mile north of downtown Lakeland. The perpetrator was killed by police seven days later in a car chase.
January 30	Dallas (2)	Texas	1	3	4	One man was killed and three other people, including a child, were injured in southern Dallas.
January 29	Greensboro (1)	North Carolina	1	6	7	One person was killed and six people were injured during a shooting at a nightclub.
January 29	Columbus (1)	Ohio	1	3	4	One person was killed and three people were injured after two shooters opened fire at a strip club in northeast Columbus.
January 28	Andrews	South Carolina	2	2	4	Two deceased victims were found lying in a road, while two injured were found nearby.
January 28	Austin (1)	Texas	1	4	5	One person was killed and four people were injured, two critically, at a hookah lounge in northeast Austin.
January 28	Philadelphia (2)	Pennsylvania	0	4	4	Four people were injured the Oxford Circle neighborhood in Northeast Philadelphia.
January 28	Los Angeles (1)	California	3	4	7	Three people were killed and four others were critically injured in the Beverly Crest neighborhood.
January 26	Newark (1)	New Jersey	1	4	5	One person was killed and four others were wounded on the sidewalk outside of a liquor store in downtown Newark.
January 26	Lancaster	Pennsylvania	0	4	4	Four people were shot and wounded at a McDonald's after a fight broke out.
January 24	Robeson County	North Carolina	3	1	4	Three people were killed and one other person critically injured.
January 23	Oakland	California	1	7	8	A teenager was killed and seven people were injured in a shootout at a gas station near the filming of a music video. Police believe the motive is gang related.
January 23	Half Moon Bay	California	7	1	8	2023 Half Moon Bay shootings: Seven people were killed, and one was critically injured at two farms. The victims were all farmworkers. A suspect was arrested for the shootings.
January 23	Chicago (2)	Illinois	2	3	5	Suspects open fire on people in a South Shore apartment, killing two people and wounding three others.
January 23	Dodge City (1)	Kansas	1	5	6	A suspect opened fire at deputies, shooting three deputies and a woman, before being killed in a shootout with police.
January 22	Tunica Resorts	Mississippi	0	4	4	Four people were wounded outside a casino early in the morning after an individual in a vehicle opened fire.
January 22	Shreveport (1)	Louisiana	0	8	8	Five adults and three children were injured in a home, four of them critically.
January 22	Brookhaven	Georgia	1	3	4	A man was killed and three other people were injured at an apartment complex.
January 22	Baton Rouge	Louisiana	0	12	12	Twelve people were injured, three critically, at a bar.
January 21	Monterey Park	California	12	9	21	2023 Monterey Park shooting: A 72-year-old man killed eleven people and injured nine others at a dance studio in Monterey Park after a Lunar New Year celebration in the city.
January 18	Lynchburg	Virginia	0	4	4	Four people were injured, two critically, after two groups opened fire on each other in a parking lot.
January 17	Houston (2)	Texas	0	4	4	Four people were injured during a drive-by shooting of a convenience store in Northeast Houston.
January 16	Sanford	Florida	1	5	6	One woman was killed and five others were injured in a targeted car-to-car shooting at an intersection.
January 16	Fort Pierce	Florida	1	11 (Note: Seven injured by gunfire)	12	One person was killed and 11 others were injured at a park during a Martin Luther King Jr. Day event. The shooting stemmed from a disagreement between two parties.
January 16	Goshen	California	6	0	6	Goshen shooting: A baby, a teenager, and four others were killed at a home.
January 15	Houston (1)	Texas	1	4	5	Five people were shot, one fatally, after a shooter opened fire outside a club in north Houston.
January 15	Rockford	Illinois	3	2	5	Multiple shootings occurred leaving three killed and two others injured.
January 15	Phoenix (1)	Arizona	0	4	4	Four people, including a pregnant woman, were injured in a townhouse.
January 15	Homestead	Florida	1	3	4	One person was killed and three others were injured during a drive-by shooting near an intersection.
January 13	Cleveland (1)	Ohio	4	1	5	A man went inside a home in the west side and opened fire, shooting five family members, killing four, before being taken into custody.
January 9	Minneapolis (2)	Minnesota	0	4	4	Four people were shot near the Lake Street/Midtown station at about 8:00 p.m.
January 9	Philadelphia (1)	Pennsylvania	3	1	4	Three people were killed and one was critically injured in the Mayfair neighborhood.
January 9	Denver (1)	Colorado	0	4	4	Four people were wounded near an intersection in the LoDo neighborhood.
January 8	Albany	Georgia	0	4	4	Four people, including three teenagers, were wounded in a drive-by shooting while playing basketball in Driskell Park.
January 8	Minneapolis (1)	Minnesota	0	4	4	A woman and three men were wounded outside of a party on Hennepin Avenue.
January 7	Huntsville	Alabama	2	13	15	Two women were killed and 13 other people were wounded during a shootout between two groups at a birthday party held in a strip mall.
January 7	Lee Township	Michigan	4	0	4	A man killed his wife and two daughters before killing himself.
January 7	High Point (1)	North Carolina	5	0	5	A man killed his three children and his wife before killing himself.
January 6	San Francisco (1)	California	1	3	4	Four people were shot, one fatally, near a police station in the Mission District.
January 6	Dallas (1)	Texas	3	2	5	Three people were killed and two others were injured in the parking lot of an apartment building in North Dallas.
January 5	New Orleans (2)	Louisiana	2	3	5	Two were killed and three were injured in Central City.
January 5	Miami Gardens	Florida	0	10	10	At least 10 people were wounded outside a restaurant during the filming of a music video for rapper French Montana.
January 4	Enoch	Utah	8	0	8	Killing of the Haight family: A man fatally shot his five children, wife, and mother-in-law before killing himself.
January 4	Baltimore (1)	Maryland	1	4	5	Five teenage boys were shot, one fatally, at a mall in West Baltimore.
January 4	Dumfries	Virginia	1	4	5	A man shot his teenage girlfriend, her three siblings (one fatally) and a teenage relative in a domestic dispute.
January 3	New Orleans (1)	Louisiana	0	4	4	Four people were shot and wounded in the Hoffman Triangle neighborhood.
January 3	Washington (1)	District of Columbia	1	3	4	One man was killed and three males were injured, including an eight-year-old boy, after two shooters opened fire near an intersection in Northwest DC.
January 1	Allentown	Pennsylvania	0	4	4	Four adults were injured near a recreation center.
January 1	Chicago (1)	Illinois	1	3	4	A 17-year-old boy was killed and three other teenagers were wounded in Washington Park during a car-to-car shooting.
January 1	Durham (1)	North Carolina	0	5	5	Five people were injured in a drive-by shooting outside a Subway restaurant.
January 1	Clinton	Maryland	2	2	4	Two adults were killed and two others, including a child, were injured in a domestic violence incident.
January 1	Ocala	Florida	2	4	6	Two people were killed and four others were injured in an early-morning shooting amid a crowd of approximately 100 people.
January 1	Oklahoma City (1)	Oklahoma	1	3	4	One person was killed and at least three others were injured in a parking lot in downtown Oklahoma City.
January 1	Mifflin Township	Ohio	1	4	5	One person was killed and four others were injured at a strip club near John Glenn Columbus International Airport after an argument escalated into gunfire.

== Monthly statistics ==
2023 US mass shooting statistics by month
Month	Mass shootings	Total number dead (including the shooter/s)	Total number wounded (including the shooter/s)	Occurred at a school or university	Occurred at a place of worship
January	55	94	226	0	0
February	44	58	162	3	0
March	35	55	115	1	1
April	54	62	244	1	0
May	81	99	328	0	0
June	69	66	318	1	0
July	78	76	356	2	0
August	40	54	165	1	0
September	22	26	76	0	0
October	37	62	182	1	0
November	41	47	154	0	0
December	40	75	110	0	0
Total	596	774	2436	10	1
