= 2023 in Virginia =

- Decades: 2000s; 2010s; 2020s
- See also: History of Virginia; Historical outline of Virginia; List of years in Virginia; 2023 in the United States

The following is a list of events of the year 2023 in Virginia.

== Incumbents ==
=== State government ===
- Governor: Glenn Youngkin (R)

== Events ==
- January 3 – Newport News elementary school teacher Abby Zwerner is shot by a 6-year=old student at Richneck Elementary School. Zwerner suffers life-threatening injuries but survives the shooting.
- February 24 – Two people, Christine Banfield and Joseph Ryan, are killed in a double homicide at a residence in Herndon. The case, which drew international attention as the "Au Pair Murder," led to the 2024–2025 prosecution of the victim's husband, former IRS agent Brendan Banfield, and the family's Brazilian au pair, Juliana Peres Magalhães, for an alleged conspiracy to stage a home invasion.
- May 15 – A bat-wielding man attacks two staffers for Representative Gerry Connolly at his office in Fairfax. Connolly was not in office at the time of the attack. The suspect is also charged with a hate crime for an earlier incident in which he is accused of smashing a white woman's windshield with a bat.
- June 6 – 2023 Richmond shooting: Two people are killed and five others injured after a mass shooting at Huguenot High School in Richmond.
- August 10 – The National Highway Traffic Safety Administration opens an investigation into a fatal vehicle crash in Virginia involving a Model Y vehicle from Tesla.
- September 15 – The U.S. government warns a Virginia judge that allowing a United States Marine to keep an Afghan war orphan risks violating international law and could be viewed as endorsing international child abduction.

== See also ==
- 2023 in the United States
