= 2027 in Virginia =

- Decades: 2000s; 2010s; 2020s
- See also: History of Virginia; Historical outline of Virginia; List of years in Virginia; 2027 in the United States

The following is a list of events of the year 2027 in Virginia.

== Events ==
=== Planned or predicted ===
- July 1 - Virginia will begin to allow licensed retailers to sell cannabis to recreational users above the age of 21
- November 2 -
  - 2027 Virginia House of Delegates election
  - 2027 Virginia Senate election
