= Virginia school shooting =

Virginia school shooting may refer to:

- Appalachian School of Law shooting, Grundy, Virginia, January 16, 2002
- Virginia Tech shooting, Blacksburg, Virginia, April 16, 2007
- University of Virginia shooting, Charlottesville, Virginia, November 13, 2022
- Shooting of Abby Zwerner, Richneck Elementary School, Newport News, Virginia, January 6, 2023
- Virginia Commonwealth University shooting, Richmond, Virginia, June 6, 2023

== See also ==
- List of mass shootings in the United States
