= Bruce Branch (American football) =

American football player (born 1978)

No. 23
- Position: Cornerback

Personal information
- Born: September 14, 1978 (age 48); Queens, New York, U.S.
- Listed height: 5 ft 11 in (1.80 m)
- Listed weight: 189 lb (86 kg)

Career information
- High school: Huguenot (Richmond, Virginia)
- College: Penn State
- NFL draft: 2002: undrafted

Career history
- Jacksonville Jaguars (2002)*; Green Bay Packers (2002)*; Tennessee Titans (2002)*; Washington Redskins (2002); Barcelona Dragons (2003)
- * Offseason or practice squad member only

Career NFL statistics
- Games played: 1
- Return yards: 32
- Stats at Pro Football Reference

Bruce Lamont Branch (born September 14, 1978) is an American former professional football player who was a cornerback for the Washington Redskins of the National Football League (NFL). He played college football for the Penn State Nittany Lions.

Branch attended and played high school football at Huguenot High School in Richmond, Virginia.
