= 2026 in Virginia =

- Decades: 2000s; 2010s; 2020s
- See also: History of Virginia; Historical outline of Virginia; List of years in Virginia; 2026 in the United States

The following is a list of events of the year 2026 in Virginia.

== Incumbents ==
=== State government ===
- Governor: Abigail Spanberger (D)

== Events ==
=== January ===
- January 14 – The Federal Bureau of Investigation executes a search warrant at the home of The Washington Post journalist Hannah Natanson during a leak investigation.
- January 17 – Abigail Spanberger is sworn in as governor. On her first day in office, she vetoes an executive order that allowed local police officers to act as Immigration and Customs Enforcement agents.
- January 22 – In King v. Youngkin, a federal district court rules that Virginia's disenfranchisement policy violated the terms of the Virginia Readmission Act that was passed in 1870, restoring voting rights to Virginians who were convicted of a felony that was not a common law felony in 1870.

=== February ===
- February 21 – Two people are killed and seven injured in a shooting in Richmond.

=== March ===
- March 1 – An off-duty Foreign Service officer stabs four women in a road rage incident on the Capital Beltway in Annandale, killing one. He also fatally stabs his pet dog. The assailant is shot and killed by a responding police officer.
- March 12 – A man opens fire at an ROTC class at Old Dominion University, killing one person and injuring two others. The gunman is also killed.

=== April ===
- April 5 – The Mary Washington Eagles beat the Emory Eagles 75–73 on a buzzer beater to win the 2026 NCAA Division III men's basketball tournament.
- April 13 – Governor Spanberger signs a bill that ends tax exemptions for several Confederacy-related organizations, including the United Daughters of the Confederacy.
- April 14 – Governor Spanberger signs a bill that adds Virginia to the National Popular Vote Compact.
- April 16 – Former Lieutenant Governor Justin Fairfax kills his wife Cerina Fairfax and himself in a murder-suicide at their Annandale home.
- April 21 – Voters approve a referendum for a new congressional map that redraws House of Representatives districts to favor Democrats. The proposed amendment is part of a larger series of redistrictings.
- April 22 – A circuit court judge strikes down the new congressional map.
- April 29 – Former FBI Director James Comey appears in federal court after he was charged with threatening the life of the president. The charges are connected to a post he made in May 2025 that included a photo of seashells arranged to spell "86 47".

=== May ===
- May 6 – The FBI raids the offices of State Senate President Pro Tempore L. Louise Lucas (D-Portsmouth) as part of a corruption investigation.
- May 8 – The Virginia Supreme Court strikes down the new congressional map.
- May 12 – Measles resurgence in the United States: The Virginia Department of Health announces a measles outbreak in Buckingham County with 35 total cases in 2026, at least 22 of whom are children.
- May 29 – Five people are killed and 44 injured after a bus accident on Interstate 95 near Quantico.

=== June ===
- June 12 – A tent at a church event in Moneta collapses, killing one person and injuring 22.
- June 27 – The MacArthur Center mall closes for redevelopment after 27 years.

=== August ===
- August 1–14 – ICE arrests 1,328 people in a two-week operation in the Washington-area suburbs of Virginia and Maryland.
- August 15 – Five people are injured in a shooting at Virginia State University.
- August 28 – The city of Richmond removes three Confederate statues.

=== September ===
- September 2 – A gunman shoots and injures a person at a school before killing himself in Waynesboro.
- September 30 – An employee at an equipment rental business in Manassas shoots three coworkers, killing two. The gunman kills himself following a police standoff in Harrisonburg.

=== October ===
- October 22 – State Senator L. Louise Lucas and several family members and associates are indicted on drug trafficking and money laundering charges. The charges are in connection to a cannabis business she helped start.

=== November ===
- November 3:
  - 2026 United States House of Representatives elections in Virginia
  - 2026 United States Senate election in Virginia: Mark Warner wins reelection.
- November 18 – Albemarle County Public Schools announces it will close all schools through Thanksgiving break after findings that hundreds of school staff were not screened for possible complaints of child abuse or neglect.

== See also ==
- 2026 in the United States
- 164th Virginia General Assembly
