= Altria Theater =

Theater in Virginia, US

Coordinates: 37.546236°N 77.452208°W

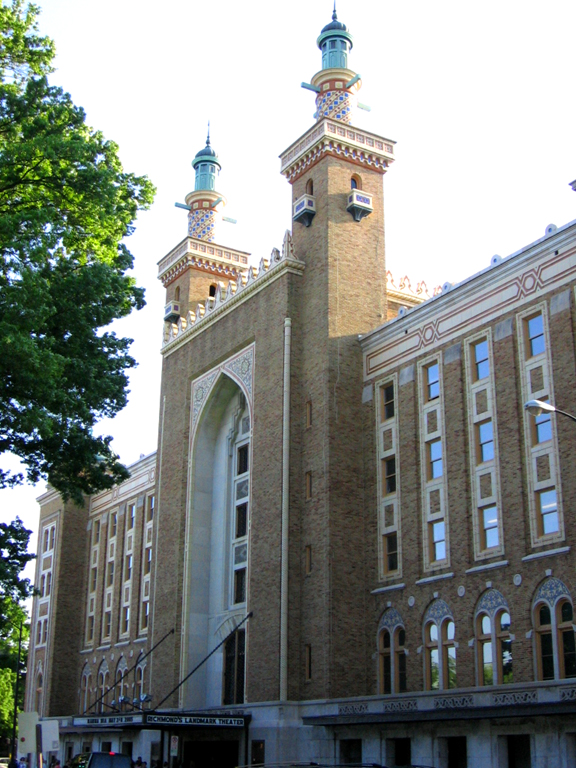
- Exterior of the venue (c.2003)
- Interactive map of Altria Theater
- Former names: Acca Temple Shrine (1928-40); Mosque Theater (1940-95); Landmark Theater (1995-2014)
- Address: 6 N Laurel St; Richmond, VA 23220-4700
- Location: Virginia Commonwealth University
- Owner: City of Richmond
- Capacity: 3,565

Construction
- Groundbreaking: February 7, 1926
- Opened: October 28, 1927
- Rebuilt: During 2013 and 2014
- Cost: $1.65 million ($30 million in 2025 dollars)
- Architects: Marcellus E. Wright Sr.; Charles M. Robinson; Charles Custer Robinson

Website
- Venue Website
- The Mosque
- U.S. Historic district – Contributing property
- Part of: Monroe Park Historic District (ID84003572)
- Designated CP: July 05, 1984

The Altria Theater, sometimes referred to as "the Mosque," in Richmond, Virginia, United States is a theater at the southwest corner of Monroe Park on the campus of Virginia Commonwealth University, and is the largest venue of Richmond CenterStage's performing arts complex. Formerly known as The Mosque and the Landmark Theater, the Altria Theater was originally built for Shriners of the Acca Temple Shrine.

In 1940, the building was purchased by the City of Richmond, which converted much of its interior for municipal use. The Richmond Police Department occupied the theater's basement, where they opened up office space, classrooms, a gymnasium, and a shooting range for the police academy. An underground swimming pool was also maintained, initially for training purposes, until it was filled in with concrete during the 2014 renovation. Many are familiar with the basement of the Mosque as the location for VCU class registration, which occurred several times each year.

The name of the theater was changed in 1995 from "The Mosque" to "Landmark Theater" following a year of restoration. After a $10 million renovation gift from the company, the theater was officially dubbed the Altria Theater in February 2014. It annually plays host to big-name musical and theatrical performers.

The theater was designed in Moorish Revival style by Marcellus E. Wright Sr. in association with Charles M. Robinson and Charles Custer Robinson circa 1925. J. R. Ray, of the Richmond Tile and Mosaic Works, was responsible for the widely used ornamental tile, and J. Frank Jones, of the Rambusch Decorating Company, oversaw the interior decoration. The building officially opened in 1927, and was dedicated by the Shriners in 1928.

Performers such as Elvis Presley, Jimi Hendrix, Whitney Houston, Loretta Lynn, Bill Burr, Grateful Dead, Bruce Springsteen, Frank Sinatra, Roy Buchanan, B. B. King, Widespread Panic, and The Supremes held shows at this venue. Notable Broadway performances such as Wicked, The Lion King, Les Miserables, and Cats have also been past visitors of The Altria Theater.

== Statistics ==
- Theater capacity: 3,565 seats
- Ballroom capacity: 1,100 persons
- Ballroom dimensions: 18,000 square feet (1,700 m^{2})

== 2023 shooting ==
On June 6, 2023, a shooting occurred in the parking lot after a graduation ceremony for Huguenot High School. One suspect was arrested while a second was cleared and released. 20 year-old Amari Pollard pled guilty to first-degree murder and received a sentence of 43 years in prison, with 18 years suspended.
