= 2023 Atlanta shooting =

Mass shooting in Georgia, U.S.

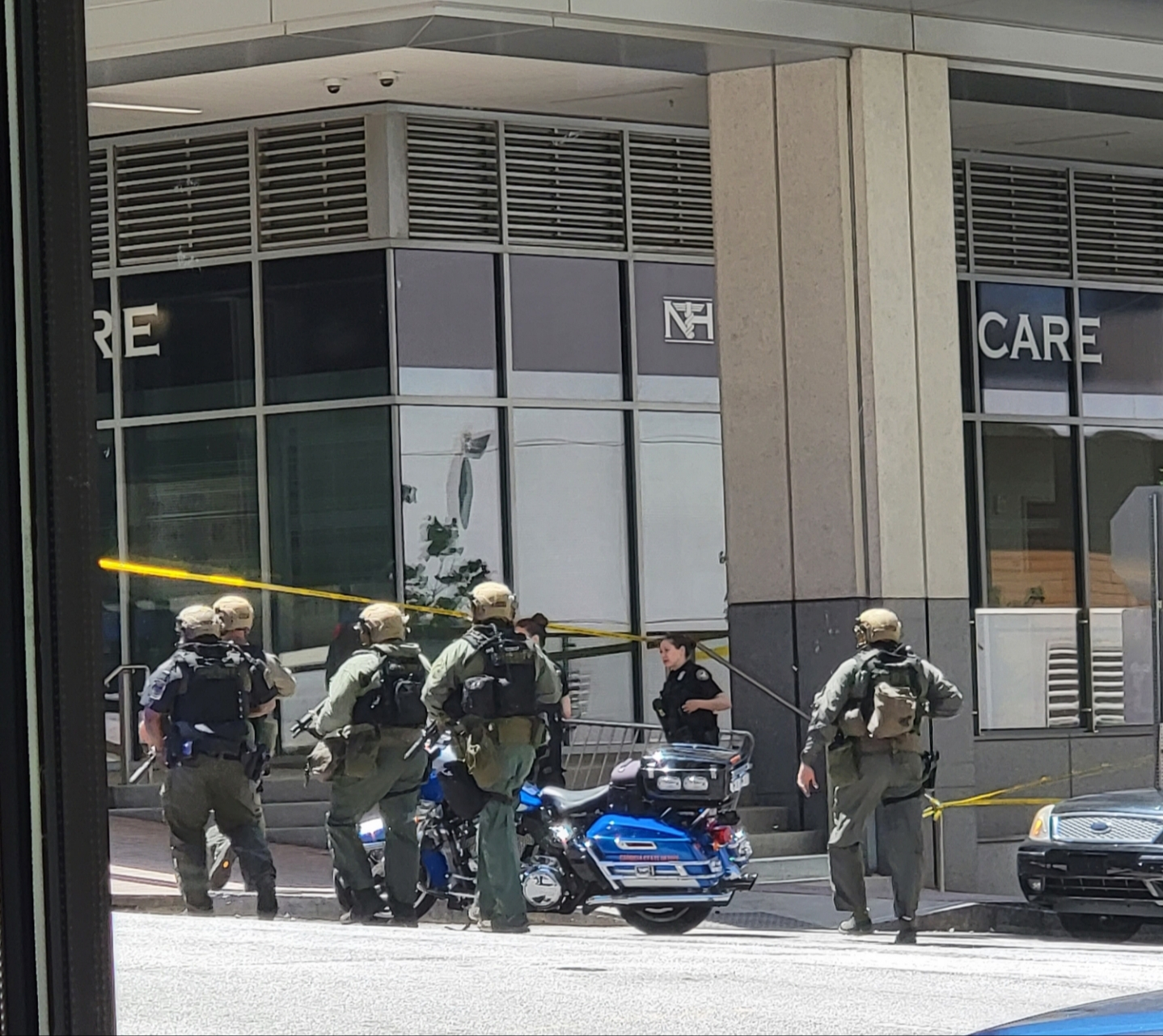
- Law enforcement officers at the hospital approximately one and a half hours after the shooting
- Location: 33.7852°N 84.3883°W; Midtown Atlanta, Georgia, U.S.
- Date: May 3, 2023; 3 years ago c. 12:00 p.m. (UTC−4)
- Attack type: Mass shooting
- Weapon: Handgun
- Deaths: 1
- Injuries: 4
- Accused: Deion Duwane Patterson

On May 3, 2023, a mass shooting occurred at a Northside Hospital facility in Midtown Atlanta, Georgia, United States. Five people were shot, one fatally and three critically, before a male suspect fled the scene. The suspect, Deion Patterson, was apprehended eight hours later and charged with one count of murder and four counts of aggravated assault.

== Shooting ==
The shooting took place on May 3, 2023, at approximately 12:00 p.m. EDT. Police were dispatched at 12:08 p.m. The Atlanta Police Department (APD) issued a tweet at 12:37 p.m. urging residents to shelter in place near Northside Hospital's Midtown facility, following up reports of an active shooter situation inside the building with multiple confirmed injuries. The facility is located in a commercial district within Atlanta. According to police, the suspect was there for an appointment and was accompanied by his mother. At some point, he became agitated and pulled out a handgun. The nature of the appointment has not been disclosed due to HIPAA regulations. The APD began a manhunt for the suspect several minutes later, tweeting a photograph of the suspect. Atlantic House apartments, located near the hospital, was put under lockdown. The shelter-in-place was lifted an hour later.

According to APD chief Darin Schierbaum, the suspect stole a white Toyota Tacoma truck at a nearby Shell gas station and was able to flee the scene. Police in Cobb County increased their presence in Vinings, Cumberland, and the area surrounding Truist Park in an effort to find the suspect. According to a license plate reader, the suspect was near Truist Park and The Battery. The stolen vehicle was recovered at a parking garage with a nearby camera recording the suspect around 12:30 p.m.

Atlanta Public Schools dispatched officers at the schools it administrates and held students for dismissal. All patient appointments at the facility were canceled for May 4.

Nearly eight hours later, at 7:40 p.m. police arrested 24-year-old Deion Patterson in Smyrna's Waterford Place neighborhood, 13 miles (21 km) from the scene of the shooting.

== Victims ==
The victims were all women, with ages ranging from 25 to 71. The deceased was identified as 39-year-old Amy St. Pierre, who was employed by the Atlanta-based Centers for Disease Control and Prevention. She had been shot point blank in the head. A reward of $10,000 was offered for information that led to the indictment of the suspect. The suspect's mother was also inside the hospital at the time of the shooting but left uninjured.

Victims were treated at Grady Memorial Hospital. According to the Associate Chief of Neurosurgery Sanjay Gupta, three victims arrived in critical condition and required surgery. The fourth victim arrived in stable condition and was not expected to require surgery. Two of the victims were able to be released within a week of the shooting, with the other two leaving the hospital on May 11 and May 15. One of the wounded victims had been shot in the head.

== Aftermath ==
Northside Medical Midtown would remain closed until May 8, when it partially reopened for most services. All locations of Laureate Medical Group closed for two days following the shooting, with the Midtown location where the shooting took place remaining closed.

=== Investigation ===
The Atlanta Police Department and United States Coast Guard worked together to investigate the shooting. The family of the suspected gunman assisted law enforcement.

The suspect was indicted in late July on the original charges of murder and aggravated assault. The suspect was also indicted on additional charges of felony murder, attempted murder, aggravated battery, criminal damage to property, theft by taking, and possession of a firearm during the commission of a felony. Investigators claimed that the suspect had an appointment at a doctor's office inside Northside Medical Midtown, but was not seen due to being late to the appointment.

== Accused ==
Deion Duwane Patterson was born in Hanover, Maryland on October 19, 1998, and raised in Jonesboro, Georgia. He is a former Coast Guard electrician's mate second class, serving from July 2018 until January 2023. He had previous criminal histories in both Henry County and Clayton County dating back to 2015. He was subsequently charged with one count of murder and four counts of aggravated assault.

== Reactions ==
President Joe Biden and Vice President Kamala Harris were made aware of the shooting. White House press secretary Karine Jean-Pierre told reporters that Biden is "frustrated about what we're seeing in our communities and in our schools and our churches". Governor Brian Kemp, following the capture of Patterson, said: "We are heartbroken by today's tragedy in Midtown Atlanta and join all Georgians in praying for those impacted and their loved ones...also thanking God for the brave local and state law enforcement who responded forcefully and without hesitation". Georgia senator Raphael Warnock, whose children were put under lockdown during the shooting, addressed Congress to demand action on gun legislation. Atlanta mayor Andre Dickens said it was a "traumatic day" for the city and called for stricter gun laws.

CDC spokesperson Benjamin Haynes said in an email that the organization was deeply saddened to learn of the death of Amy St. Pierre, who was an employee of the Atlanta-based CDC headquarters, and the only fatality of the shooting.

== See also ==
- List of mass shootings in the United States in 2023
- Buffalo, Minnesota clinic attack
- 2022 Tulsa hospital shooting
