= 2024 in Virginia =

- Decades: 2000s; 2010s; 2020s
- See also: History of Virginia; Historical outline of Virginia; List of years in Virginia; 2024 in the United States

The following is a list of events of the year 2024 in Virginia.

== Incumbents ==
=== State government ===
- Governor:Glenn Youngkin (R)

== Events ==
- February 16 – One firefighter is killed and 11 other people are injured after a house explodes in Sterling.
- March 5 –
  - Super Tuesday:
    - The Democratic Party holds presidential nominating contests in Virginia, amongst other states.
    - The Republican Party holds presidential nominating contests in Virginia, amongst other states.
- March 10 – Five people are killed after an IAI Astra 1125 private jet crashes near Hot Springs.
- April 15 – Abu Ghraib torture and prisoner abuse: A federal court in Virginia hears the first claims by survivors of the Abu Ghraib prison in Iraq. Three detainees accuse the CACI for their role in the torture at the prison.
- April 26 – Police arrest 12 protesters at the University of Mary Washington.
- April 28 – Police arrest 82 protesters at Virginia Tech.
- April 29 – Police arrest 12 protesters at Virginia Commonwealth University.
- May 5 – Virginia State Police dismantle a pro-Palestine encampment on the University of Virginia campus in Charlottesville, and arrest more than 15 students.
- November 5 – 2024 United States presidential election in Virginia

== See also ==
- 2024 in the United States
