= 2023 Annapolis shooting =

Mass shooting in Maryland, U.S.

- Location: Annapolis, Maryland, U.S.
- Date: June 11, 2023; 3 years ago
- Weapons: Pistol; Rifle
- Deaths: 3
- Injuries: 3
- Victims: Mario Alfredo Mireles; Christian Segovia; Nicholas Mireles
- Motive: Racism (alleged)
- Accused: Charles Robert Smith

On June 11, 2023, six people were shot, three fatally, outside a single family neighborhood in southeast Annapolis, Maryland, United States.

Charles Robert Smith, 43, was arrested and charged with the shooting, which prosecutors said was racially motivated; the shooter was white, and the victims were Latino. Hate crime enhancements have been filed against the alleged perpetrator.

== Shooting ==
According to the police charging documents, the six people who were shot were attending a birthday party when a dispute broke out over a parking issue.

The Mireles and Smith families had lived on the same street for years and had a history of disputes; Shirley Smith, Charles Smith's mother, had previously been accused of using racial slurs against Mario Mireles.

Mario Mireles went to Smith's home to talk about it and was arguing with Shirley Smith when her son Charles Smith returned home and confronted him. The altercation started at 1000 block of Paddington Place. Police said that the violence started after the white luxury vehicle was parked in front of the house that Charles Robert Smith shares with his mother, sparking the aforementioned argument. According to charging documents, Shirley Smith called in a complaint to the city, saying her driveway was blocked. The verbal argument became physical.

Smith confronted Mario telling him to move the car and when Mario refused Smith went back inside his home and retrieved a gun. When he came out of his home he pointed his gun at Mario Mireles and Mireles tried to grab it before Smith shot Mireles and Segovia. Smith "then stood over Mario Mireles and shot him several more times," the document says. Smith then went into his house, got a rifle and began firing through a window at people who had come trying to help the mortally wounded men. Smith fatally shot Nicolas Mireles, and wounded Rosalina Segovia, Paul Johnnson and Enner Canales-Hernandez, police said.

Twelve minutes later, Charles Smith, 43, was standing at the front door, hands in the air, as he surrendered to police. His neighbor, Mario Alfredo Mireles, was laid out on the lawn. Christian Segovia, a friend, had fallen in the space between two Paddington homes. And Nicholas Mireles, Mario's father, was down in front of a neighbor's house. They died at the scene. Rosalina Segovia, 29, Paul Johnson, 28, and Enner Canales-Hernandez, 26, were taken to the University of Maryland Shock Trauma Center in Baltimore and are in stable condition, officials said. Neighbors have said that the man made comments that were perceived as disparaging towards Hispanic individuals.

== Legal proceedings ==
An indictment against Smith was returned by a grand jury on July 21, 2023; a 42-count indictment also includes six charges of attempted first-degree murder. Smith's initial court appearance was scheduled for next Monday. His initial lawyer is no longer representing him.

Maryland's hate crime law applies to crimes that are motivated either in whole or in substantial part to another person's race, color, religious beliefs, sexual orientation, gender, gender identity, disability or national origin. It enables prosecutors to add years to a sentence, and financial penalties. Smith faces up to life in prison without possibility of parole if convicted of first-degree murder.

The case's trial was delayed by a judge until 2025. A mistrial occurred in February 2025.

== See also ==
- 2015 Chapel Hill shooting, a shooting that also stemmed from a parking dispute
- Anti-Mexican sentiment
- Capital Gazette shooting, a mass shooting which also took place in Annapolis
- Hispanophobia
