= 2025 in Virginia =

- Decades: 2000s; 2010s; 2020s
- See also: History of Virginia; Historical outline of Virginia; List of years in Virginia; 2025 in the United States

The following is a list of events of the year 2025 in Virginia.

== Incumbents ==
=== State government ===
- Governor: Glenn Youngkin (R)

== Events ==
- January 1 – FBI agents announce the seizure of more than 150 homemade pipe bombs and other explosive devices from a home in Isle of Wight County.
- May 21 – Representative Gerry Connolly, a Democrat representing Virginia's 11th congressional district, dies of cancer at the age of 75.
- June 23 - In Augusta County, 15 cars of a freight train derail near Dooms Crossing Road. There are no casualties.
- June 27 – James Edward Ryan, president of the University of Virginia, resigns under pressure from the Trump administration.
- July 30 – At a Danville magazine company building, a man enters the company office of local city Councilman Lee Vogler and sets him on fire, causing serious injuries. In court, Buck-Hayes later says he was motivated by his wife having an affair with Vogler. Buck-Hayes pleads guilty to attempted murder in 2026 and is sentenced to 40 years in prison.
- August 5 – Defense Secretary Pete Hegseth announces the Confederate Memorial at Arlington National Cemetery will be returned to the cemetery. The statue had been removed in 2023.
- September 19 – U.S. Attorney for the Eastern District of Virginia Erik Siebert resigns. Siebert had been under pressure by the Trump administration to charge New York Attorney General Letitia James with mortgage fraud, but no charges had been brought. His successor, Lindsey Halligan, brings charges against James in October.
- October 3 – Text messages surface from Jay Jones, the Democratic party candidate for Attorney General, in which he suggested the then-House Speaker should be shot and said he and his wife were "breeding little fascists".
- October 23 – A man from Honduras is killed by a passing car while fleeing immigration agents in Norfolk.
- November 4
  - 2025 Virginia Attorney General election: Jay Jones wins election to become Attorney General, beating incumbent AG Jason Miyares.
  - 2025 Virginia gubernatorial election: Former U.S. Representative Abigail Spanberger (D) wins the gubernatorial election, beating Republican Lieutenant Governor Winsome Sears.
- December 4 – The FBI arrests a man suspected of planting pipe bombs outside the DNC and RNC buildings in Washington, D.C. on January 5, 2021.
- December 29 – The Department of Justice sues Virginia over allowing in-state tuition for students without legal immigration status.

== See also ==
- 2025 in the United States
