= 2023 Richmond shooting =

Mass shooting in Virginia, U.S.

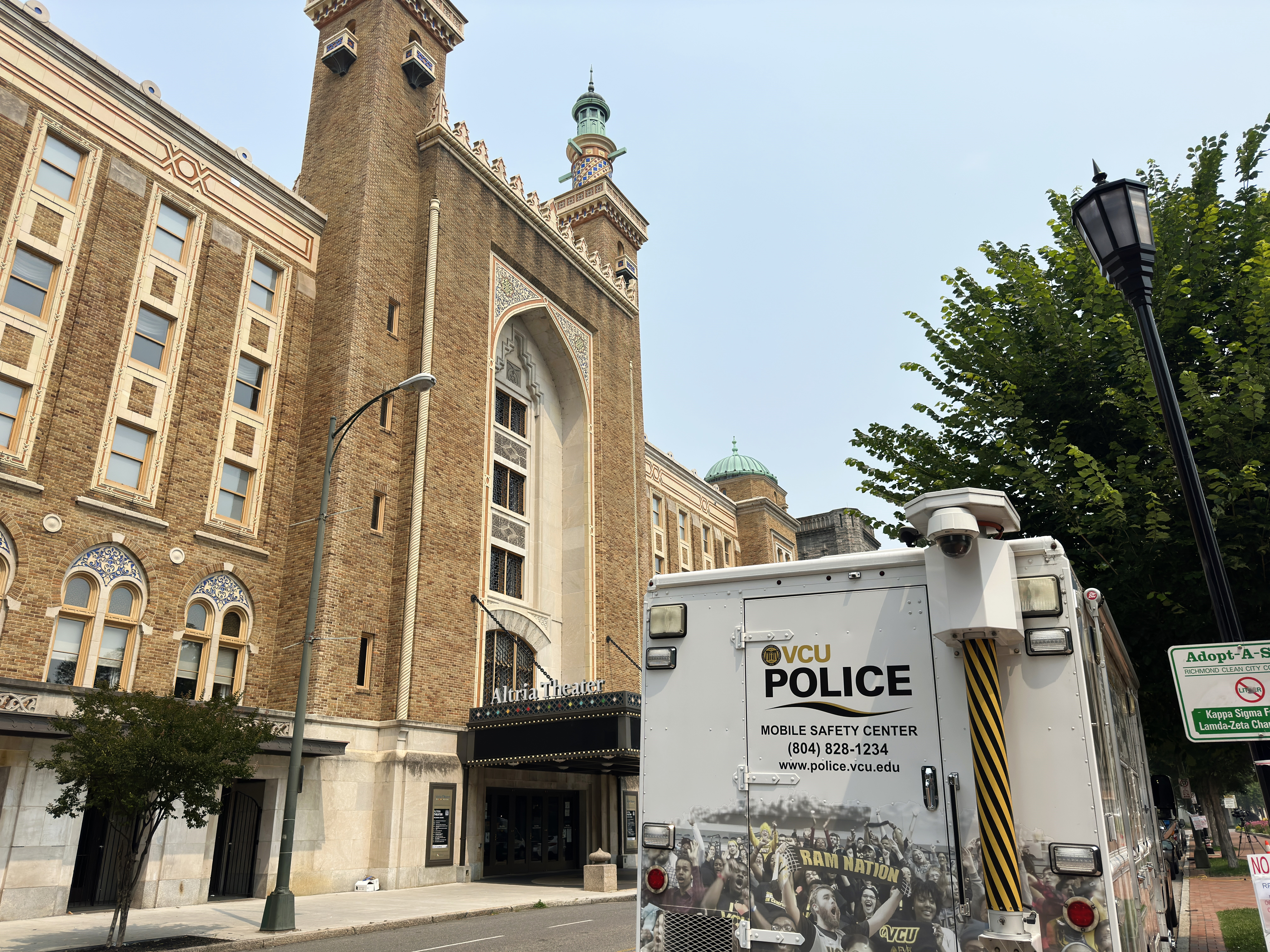
- VCU Police parked in front of the Altria Theater on June 7, 2023
- Location: Monroe Park, Richmond, Virginia, U.S.
- Date: June 6, 2023; 5:13 p.m. (EDT)
- Attack type: Mass shooting
- Weapon: Glock 43 9mm Semi-automatic pistol
- Deaths: 2
- Injuries: 17 (5 by gunfire)
- Convicted: Amari Pollard

On June 6, 2023, a mass shooting occurred in Richmond, Virginia, United States, following a high school graduation at the Altria Theater in the Monroe Park campus of the Virginia Commonwealth University (VCU).

According to the authorities, seven were wounded by gunfire, including three suffering life-threatening injuries, and twelve others suffered unrelated injuries. Later in the evening, police announced that two of those who had been wounded by gunfire had died.

Two persons were initially arrested in connection with the event but only one, 19-year-old Amari Pollard, remained a suspect.

== Background ==
Huguenot High School, of the Richmond Public Schools district, began their graduation ceremony at 4 pm local time in the Altria Theater. After the ceremony, Shawn Jackson, one of the graduates, left the theater and walked to Monroe Park to reunite with his family.

== Shooting ==
The shooting occurred in Monroe Park, outside the Altria Theater and after the graduation ceremony for Huguenot High School, around 5:13 pm local time. Graduation attendees were exiting the theater at the time of the shooting. Police inside the theater, who had been working security for the graduation, heard shots and passed that information to other emergency responders. An alert was sent out by Virginia Commonwealth University at 5:15 pm.

A member of the Richmond City School Board who was in attendance, said that the shooting began shortly after they were exiting the building and they had heard about 20 shots in quick succession. A woman selling items for families to give graduates said the whole area became chaotic, with people trampling others and possessions in order to flee the area.

The assailant was armed with four handguns and used three. One hour later, the threat was assumed to have been neutralized.

== Victims ==
The shooting resulted in the deaths of two individuals and seven wounded by gunfire and an additional six injured in the chaos of evacuating the area. Two of those initially wounded, Lorenzo Smith (36 years old) and his stepson Shawn Jackson (18 years old), died from their wounds.

According to the authorities, there were seven wounded by gunfire, including three suffering life-threatening injuries. Additionally, Smith's 9-year-old daughter was hit by a car while fleeing the vicinity of the shooting; she was treated at the scene and later went to the hospital, where she was released by June 7. Eleven other people also suffered injuries not linked with gun wounds: nine were treated for minor injuries and anxiety, and two suffered falls.

== Investigation ==
Two persons were initially arrested, one of whom was Amari Pollard, a 19-year-old man. He "had a long-running dispute" with Shawn Jackson. Richmond Police Chief Rick Edwards said at a news conference that Pollard had attended the graduation, had an "interaction" with Jackson after the ceremony, and then had retrieved a handgun from his car.

Investigators later said the other person initially arrested is not thought to have been involved. Police announced they planned to pursue charges of second-degree murder against the remaining suspect. He was held without bond. On the morning of June 7, he was arraigned on two counts of second-degree murder. A hearing was scheduled for later in June.

In February 2024, Amari Pollard pleaded guilty to first degree murder for the death of Shawn Jackson. He was then sentenced to 43 years in prison with 18 years suspended.

== Aftermath ==
The graduation ceremony for Thomas Jefferson High School, which was scheduled to take place in the Altria Theater later that evening, was canceled. Later it was announced that all graduations for the rest of the week would be canceled, and that the rescheduled ceremonies would be held at schools, with heightened security. Some local roads were closed while police investigations were ongoing.

Richmond Public Schools announced they would be closed on the following day, June 7, out of an abundance of caution. On June 7, RPS announced they would be closed for the remainder of the week, which was also the end of their school year. All unfinished graduations were rescheduled to the following week taking place at school locations instead.

== Reactions ==
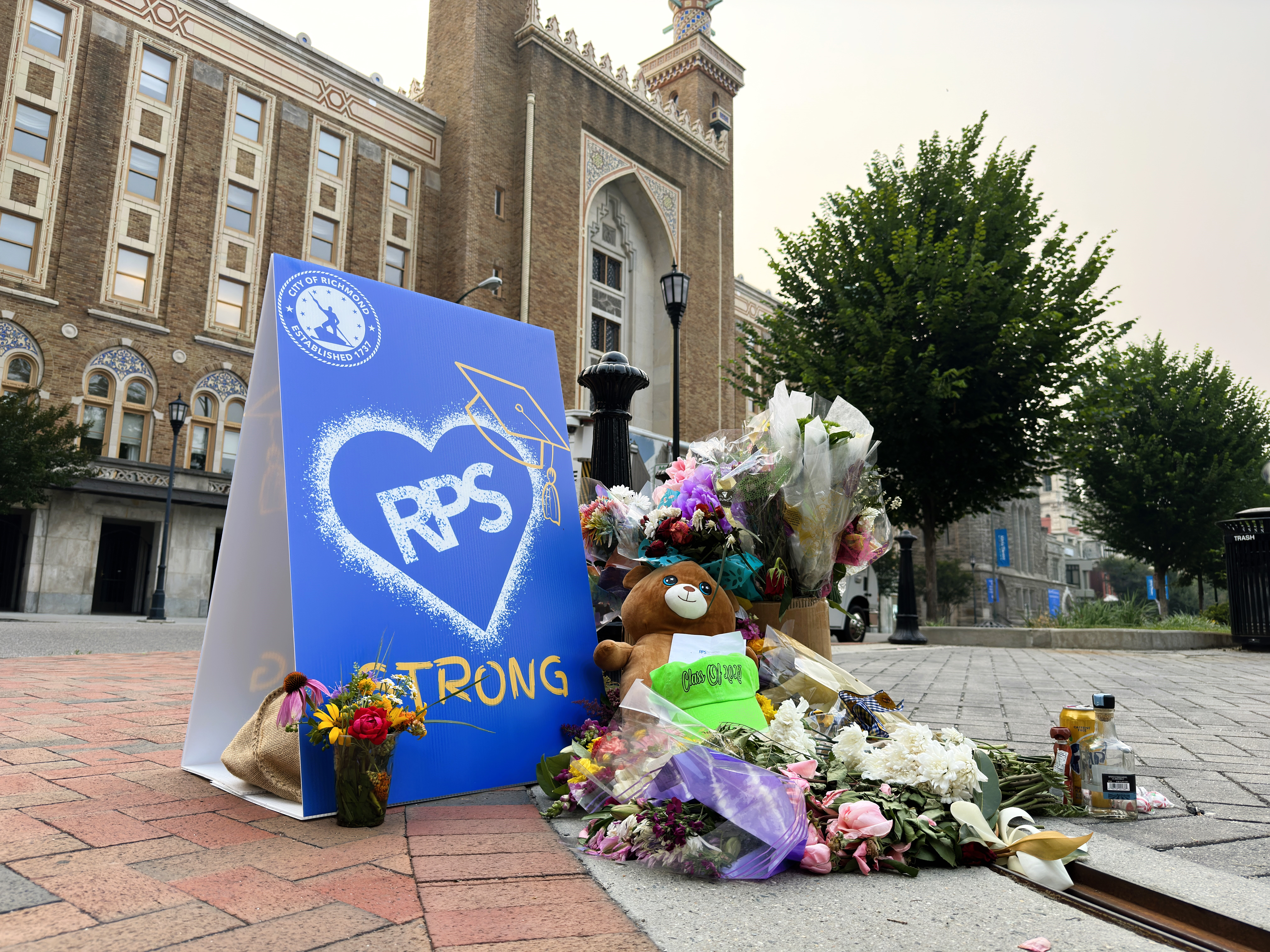
Memorial made in the days after the shooting

Winsome Sears, the Republican Lieutenant Governor of Virginia, said that gang violence was to blame for the shooting. At the time the Richmond Police Department believed the suspect knew the victims. Levar Stoney, the mayor of Richmond, Jason Kamras, the Superintendent of Richmond Public Schools, and others also reacted to the mass shooting, expressing their sympathy towards the victims and their shock.

== See also ==
- List of school shootings in the United States by death toll
- List of mass shootings in the United States in 2023
- List of school shootings in the United States (2000–present)
