= Huguenot High School =

Public high school in Virginia, US

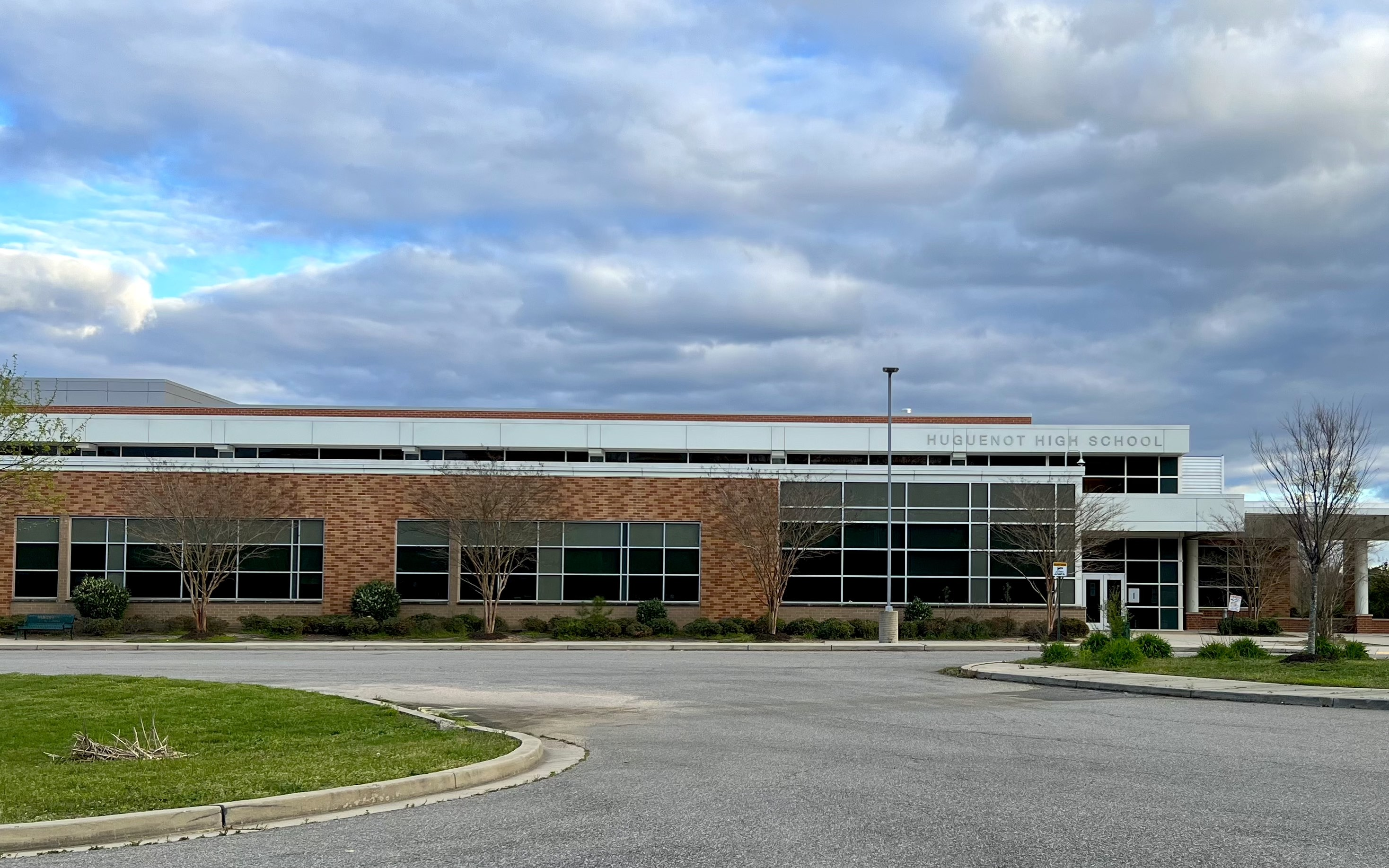

Location
- 7945 Forest Hill Avenue; Richmond, Virginia 23225; United States; 37°31′54″N 77°32′27″W

Information
- School type: Public high school
- Founded: September 6, 1960
- School district: Richmond Public Schools
- Superintendent: Jason Kamras
- Principal: Dr. Michael Massa
- Teaching staff: 110.00 (FTE)
- Grades: 9–12
- Enrollment: 1,469 (2024–25)
- Student to teacher ratio: 13.35
- Language: English
- Campus: Urban
- Colors: Kelly green and gold
- Athletics conference: Virginia High School League; AAA Central Region; AAA Dominion District
- Mascot: Falcons
- Website: Official Site

Huguenot High School /ˈhjuːɡənɒt/ HEW-gə-not, part of the Richmond Public Schools system, is a high school in Richmond, Virginia, United States for grades 9–12. Huguenot High School was named in honor of the Huguenots, French Protestants who emigrated to the English Virginia Colony beginning in the early 18th century. As of 2025, the school's student enrollment includes 53% Black students, 38% Hispanic students, 6% White students, and 3% students of other races.

== History ==
=== Land for the benefit of children ===
Huguenot High School and nearby Fred D. Thompson Middle School were built on land which was earlier known as "The Old Burton Place", a 165-acre (0.67 km^{2}) tract with an antebellum farmhouse. The land, described by a historian as poor for farming due to the many rocks on the site, was purchased by J.R.F. and Lucy Burroughs, a childless couple. In 1889, they opened an orphanage originally called "The Home for Friendless Children". The devout couple never solicited for funds, but there are tales of the support they received anyway. When Mr. Burroughs died in 1915, he was buried at a site now surrounded by neighboring apartments. There, his tombstone reads "Faithful unto Death". Burroughs Street in nearby Bon Air was named for the couple.

After Mr. Burroughs died, the orphanage was taken over by others, and became known as the Bethany Home. It was supported by the community, notably including Bon Air Presbyterian Church, until it closed during the 1940s. Part of the facility was used for the elderly and disabled, and some of the land north of modern Forest Hill Avenue still in such use at the beginning of the 21st century.

=== 1960–1970: Chesterfield County ===
Huguenot High School was built by Chesterfield County Public Schools in the Bon Air area and opened on September 6, 1960. About the same time, Meadowbrook High School, also located close to the border with Richmond, was built to a similar plan.

The first principal of the new Huguenot High, serving until 1968, was Gurney Holland Reid, a longtime principal of Manchester High School for whom G. H. Reid Elementary School was named by Chesterfield County. A fourteen classroom addition was completed around 1964. G. H. Reid retired at the end of the 1968–69 school year, the last before the city annexed the land occupied by the school the following January 1.

=== 1970 Richmond–Chesterfield annexation ===
Huguenot High School was among approximately a dozen schools, support buildings, and future school sites conveyed to the City of Richmond along with 23 square miles (60 km^{2}) of territory as the result of a compromise negotiated during the annexation suit by the City of Richmond against Chesterfield County in the late 1960s. The annexation became effective January 1, 1970.

=== As part of Richmond Public Schools ===
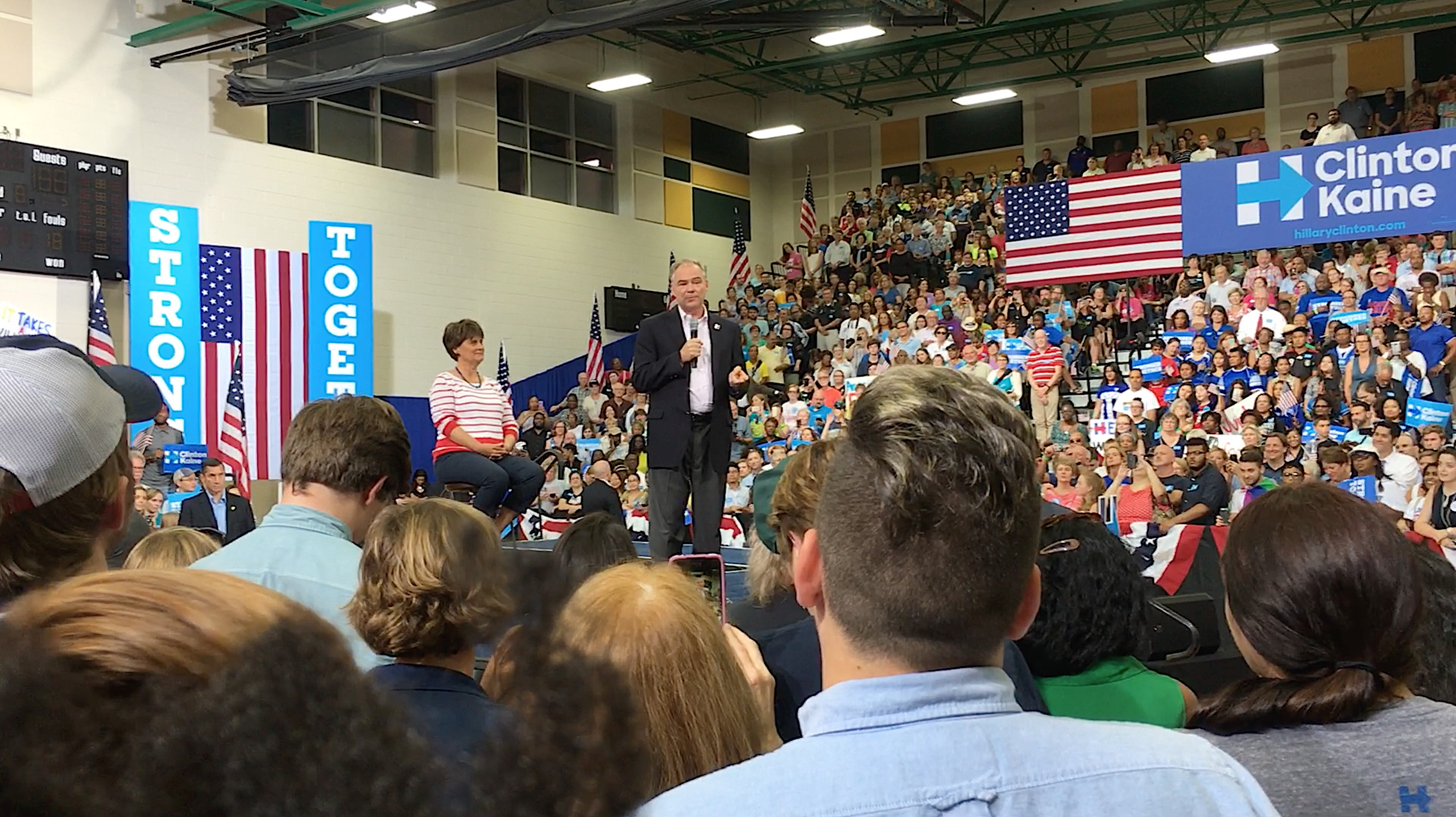
Democratic VP nominee Tim Kaine addresses a crowd at Huguenot High School during the 2016 presidential campaign, with wife Anne Holton.

The city school system started operating Huguenot High School in the summer of 1970. At almost the same time as the annexed area was added to the city, Richmond Public Schools began a court-ordered desegregation busing program in the fall of 1971. With its property actually adjoining the border with Chesterfield County in the Bon Air area, some of the students assigned to Huguenot High School had very long school bus rides from the East End of the city. Other students who lived close to Huguenot were assigned as far away as the former John F. Kennedy High School, located past the opposite side of Richmond's city limits in the edge of Henrico County. The river's location running lengthwise through the center of the city and the limited number of bridges in 1971 added to the transportation riding times and mileage. Within a year, white flight became evident in residential housing patterns, especially in the annexed area, where the busing program was cited as a major objection by those leaving the city. Some minority families also objected to the transportation hardships, as well as loss of traditional family participation at neighborhood schools, notably including Richmond high schools named for Maggie L. Walker, Samuel C. Armstrong, and John Marshall which had been attended by generations of some families.

In 1979, Huguenot High School became the Huguenot building within the Jefferson-Huguenot-Wythe High School. Jefferson-Huguenot-Wythe was created by Richmond Public Schools because of declining enrollment and the continued loss of revenue for education. It resulted in combining Thomas Jefferson, Huguenot, and George Wythe into one unique school in three widely separated facilities. This change was implemented to reduce expenses and to create a learning environment which would meet the needs of all students. The plan was difficult to administer and suffered from transportation logistics.

In August, 1986, the Huguenot building was returned to the status of Huguenot High School and has operated as a separate school again since then. Richmond Public Schools added magnet school programs and other projects, and was released by the court-ordered busing program in the early 1990s.

Grammy Award-winning R&B singer D'Angelo attended Huguenot in the early 1990s, but dropped out in 1991 to pursue a music career.

A new Huguenot High School, built beside the original building, opened in January 2015. The new building broke ground in 2012, and construction wrapped up in December 2014. The project itself cost an estimated $63 million.

On August 1, 2016, Democratic vice-presidential nominee and Senator from Virginia Tim Kaine addressed a crowd in the new school's gymnasium as part of the Clinton-Kaine campaign.

=== 2023 shooting ===
On June 6, 2023, a mass shooting occurred at Monroe Park, outside the Huguenot High School graduation ceremony. An 18-year-old graduate, Shawn Jackson, and his stepfather, Lorenzo Smith, were killed, and seventeen others were injured. Amari Pollard was arrested for the shooting.

== Academics ==
As of 2025, Huguenot High School is fully accredited, labeled as "on track" by the Virginia Department of Education, and has a graduation rate of 77%. 69% of students complete at least one AP/IB Exam or dual enrollment course.

== Notable alumni ==
- Bruce Branch, former NFL player
- Corey Holliday, former NFL player
