= 2023 Trabuco Canyon shooting =

Mass shooting in California, U.S.

Coordinates: 33.6838°N 117.6203°W

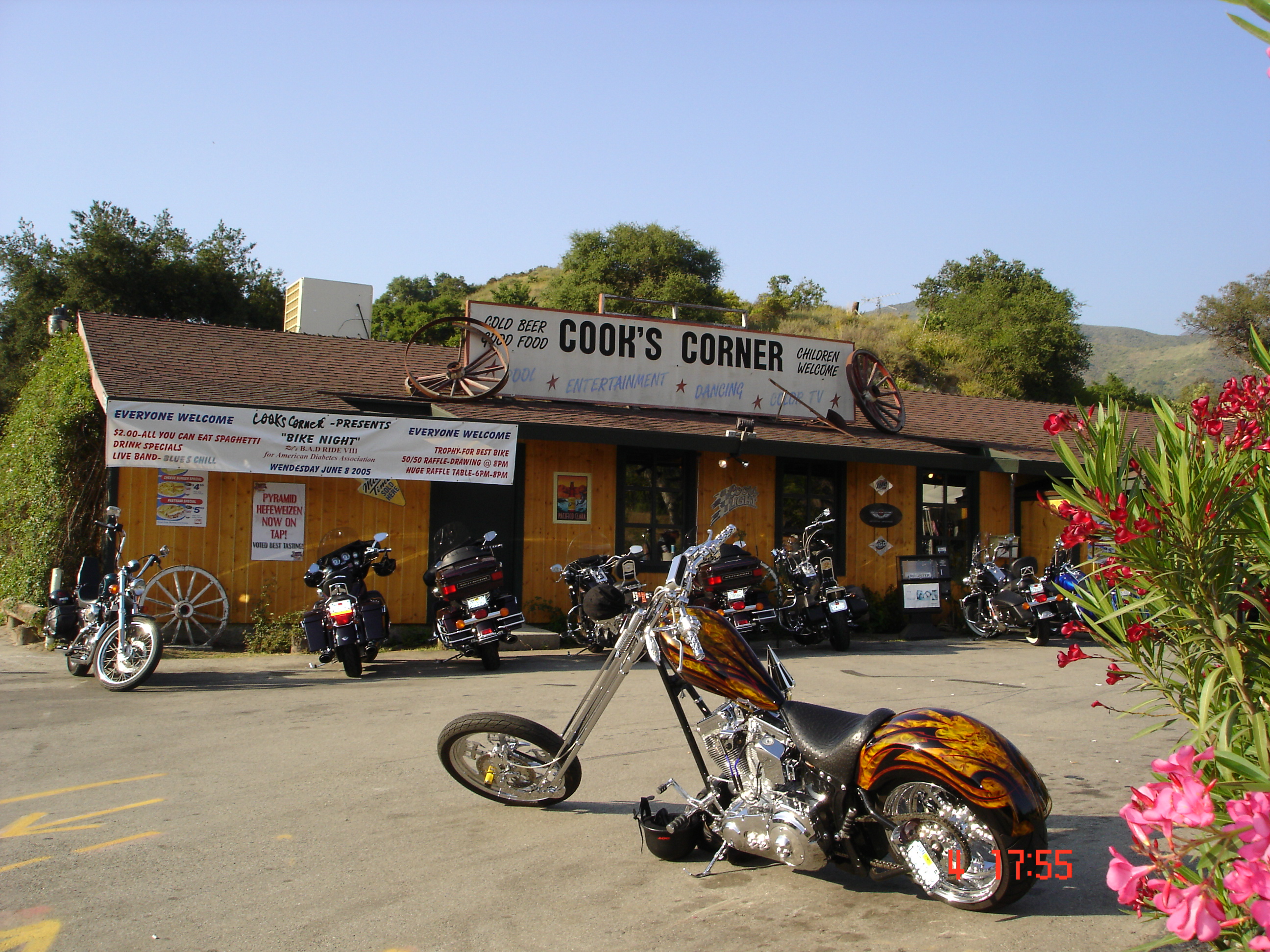
- A 2005 image of Cook's Corner when it was a biker bar
- Location: Cook's Corner bar Trabuco Canyon, California, U.S.
- Date: August 23, 2023; 3 years ago (PDT; UTC-7)
- Attack type: Mass shooting, triple-murder, attempted uxoricide, shootout
- Weapons: .380 ACP Ruger LC380 semi-automatic pistol; .38 Special Smith & Wesson revolver; .25 ACP Beretta 950B (unused); 12-gauge Mossberg Maverick 88 pump-action shotgun
- Deaths: 4 (including the perpetrator)
- Injuries: 6
- Perpetrator: John Patrick Snowling
- Motive: Marital dispute

On Wednesday, August 23, 2023, a mass shooting occurred at the Cook's Corner bar in Trabuco Canyon, California, United States. Three people were killed and six others wounded before the gunman, 59-year-old ex-Ventura police officer John Snowling, was shot and killed by responding police officers.

== Shooting ==
The perpetrator, 59-year-old ex-Ventura police officer John Snowling, entered the Cook's Corner bar in Trabuco Canyon, California, where he shot his estranged wife, Marie Snowling. Police received reports of shots being fired between 6:40 pm and 7:00 pm (PDT). It was estimated that over 50 first response vehicles attended the scene.

Although she was shot in the face, Marie Snowling survived. Her female dining companion, 49-year-old Tonya Clark, was shot and was able to walk outside, but then died. The gunman continued shooting at other patrons, including members of a band playing at the bar, two of whom sustained minor injuries.

Snowling, who was initially armed with two handguns, left the restaurant to retrieve another handgun and a 12-gauge shotgun from his silver Toyota Tundra pickup truck parked in the lot outside the restaurant. While outside, Snowling shot and killed two additional patrons, 53-year-old Glen Sprowl Jr., and 67-year-old John Leehey. He was shot and killed at his pickup truck by responding Orange County Sheriff deputies.

At least 75 spent casings from police firearms were recovered from the crime scene. It was determined that seven deputies discharged their firearms at the assailant. Patrol units were struck by the suspect's gunfire.

== Perpetrator ==
John Patrick Snowling (January 15, 1964 – August 23, 2023) spent his early childhood in Quincy, Massachusetts, moving in 1973 with his family to Goleta, California, when his father was transferred to California by his employer. Snowling was raised in Goleta and attended Dos Pueblos High School from 1979 to 1982. After graduation, he became a reserve officer with the Santa Barbara Sheriff’s Department in 1982.

Snowling joined the Ventura Police Department (VPD) in 1986, (Note: Sources differ on the specific month. The Orange County Register says November 1986, whereas the Ventura County Star says July 1986) serving until February 2014. At the time of his retirement, he had reached the rank of sergeant. During his 27-year career with the department, Snowling served as president of the Ventura Police Officers' Association, worked as a motorcycle officer, and served as a field training officer. Since VPD destroyed personnel records after five years, it was not known whether Snowling had any disciplinary actions against him during his tenure with the department.

Snowling married Marie in late 1998 or early 1999. The couple lived in Camarillo until they separated in November 2020. Marie filed for divorce in December 2022. She then moved to Orange County, and Snowling moved to Heath, Ohio. The pair had two children who were adults at the time of the shooting.

== See also ==
- List of mass shootings in the United States in 2023
- List of shootings in California
