= Biker bar =

Type of bar

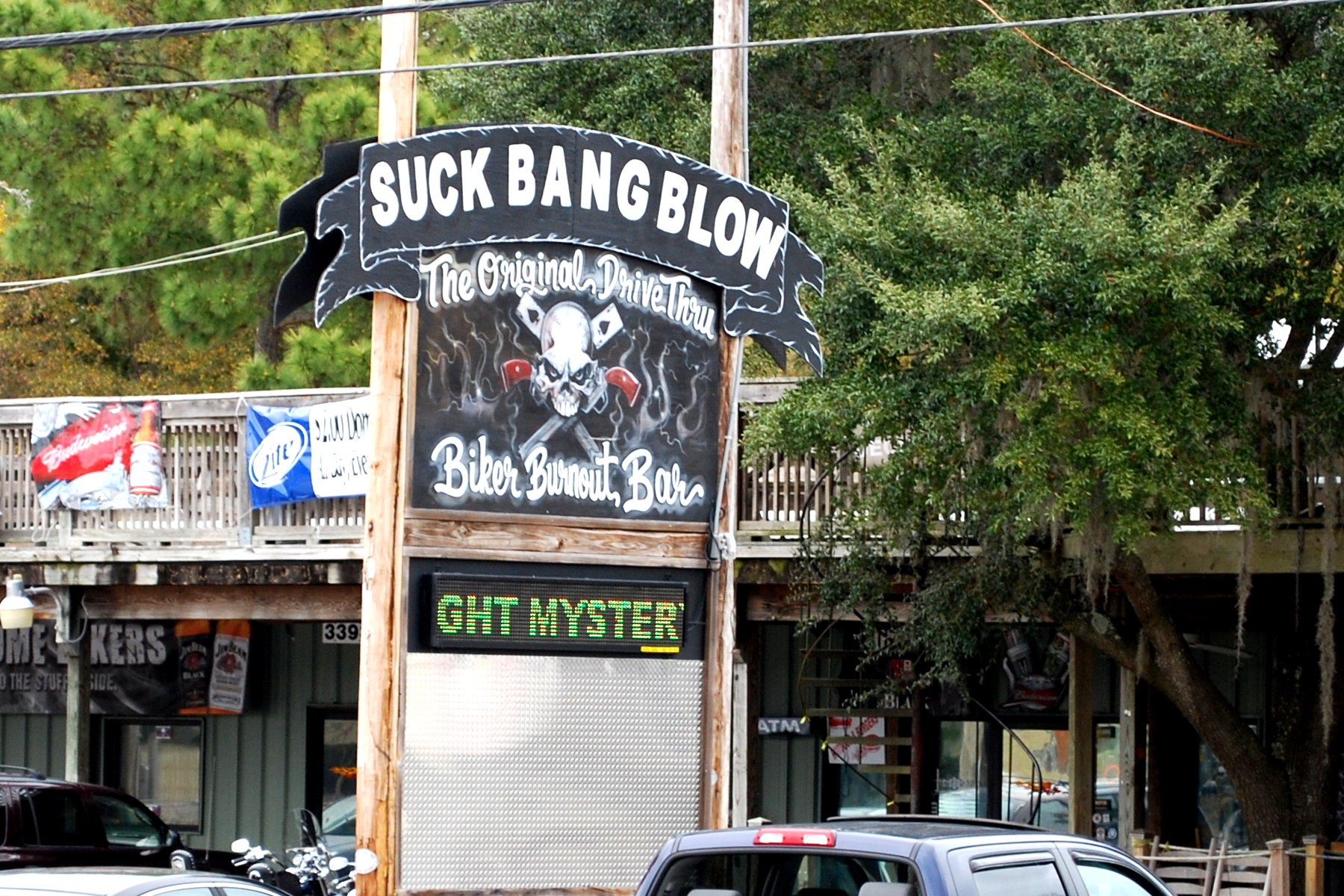
The Suck Bang Blow biker bar in Murrell's Inlet, South Carolina

A biker bar is a bar that is frequented by bikers (motorcycle riders). Some are owned or managed by people who are friendly toward bikers. Some bars and restaurants advertise that they are "biker friendly" to attract more bikers and motorcycle (bike) enthusiasts. Biker bars are patronized by people from all walks of life, including bikers, non-bikers, and motorcycle club adherents, including outlaw motorcycle clubs.

== Biker socialization ==
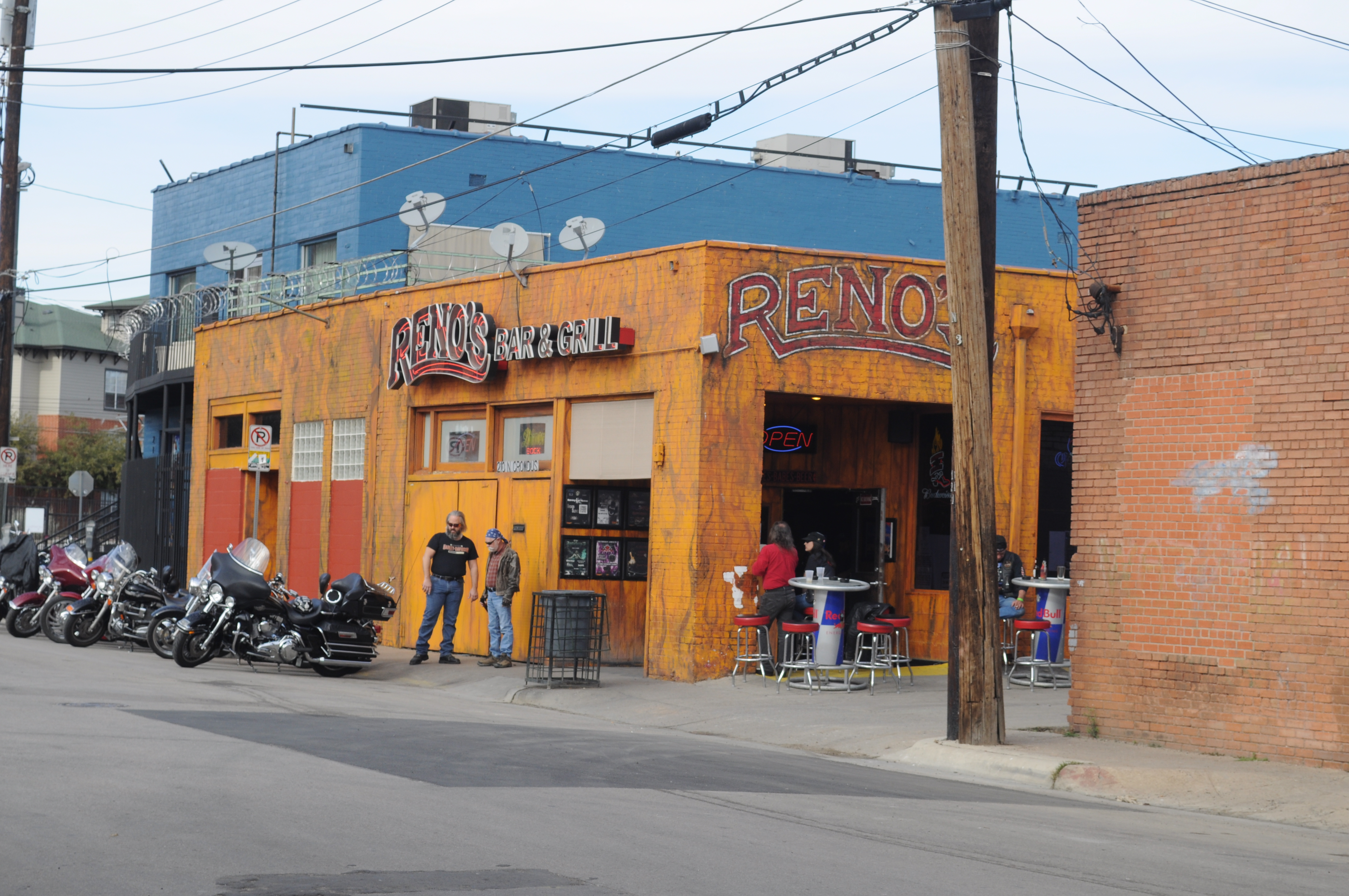
Reno's Chop Shop Bar & Grill in Deep Ellum, Dallas, Texas

Biker bars provide a place for people to congregate, socialize, network, eat, drink and celebrate. At times, biker bars may have many motorcycles parked in front of them, such as during a motorcycle rally. This provides an opportunity for bikers to socialize, compare their motorcycles, mechanical customizations and modifications, and to discuss aspects of motorcycles and motorcycling.

Many biker bars have rules on whether they allow patrons to wear "colors", many biker bars do not allow "colors" as these are used to define one's position and/or alliance to one club over another. The "No Colors" club rules have become more popular over the years as a way to reduce tension between rival club members and potential security issues.

=== Motorcycle clubs ===
Motorcycle clubs may assign a club member to remain outside of a bar to guard their motorcycles from vandalism or theft while the rest of the group congregates inside. Members of outlaw motorcycle clubs have been known to patronize biker bars. Some motorcycle clubs, including outlaw motorcycle clubs, adopt public biker bars as their club bar; as a bar that club members regularly frequent. This can provide opportunities for motorcycle clubs to meet potential prospects, or recruits, for their clubs. Motorcycle clubs may cordon off an area of a bar as reserved for their members and those that they choose to socialize with, such as other select bikers, single women and friends. This may also occur to provide club members with a vantage point to observe activity occurring in a bar and to spot potential threats. Club biker bars also provide a space for members to meet and discuss club matters, and as a means to unify the group through socialization and camaraderie. Sometimes arrangements are made between motorcycle clubs and bar managers or owners regarding the utilization of a bar in relation to the regular presence of club members.

Motorcycle club members have also performed bouncer services at times in biker bars. This can occur for several reasons, such as to protect their members or to prevent various conflicts from occurring or escalating. Sometimes club members work in unison with bouncer staff in bars, and sometimes club members are paid employees as part-time bouncers. Additionally, club members sometimes receive preferential service by bar staff, such as not having to wait in lines to get inside of a crowded bar while non-club members wait outside in a queue.

== Notable biker bars ==
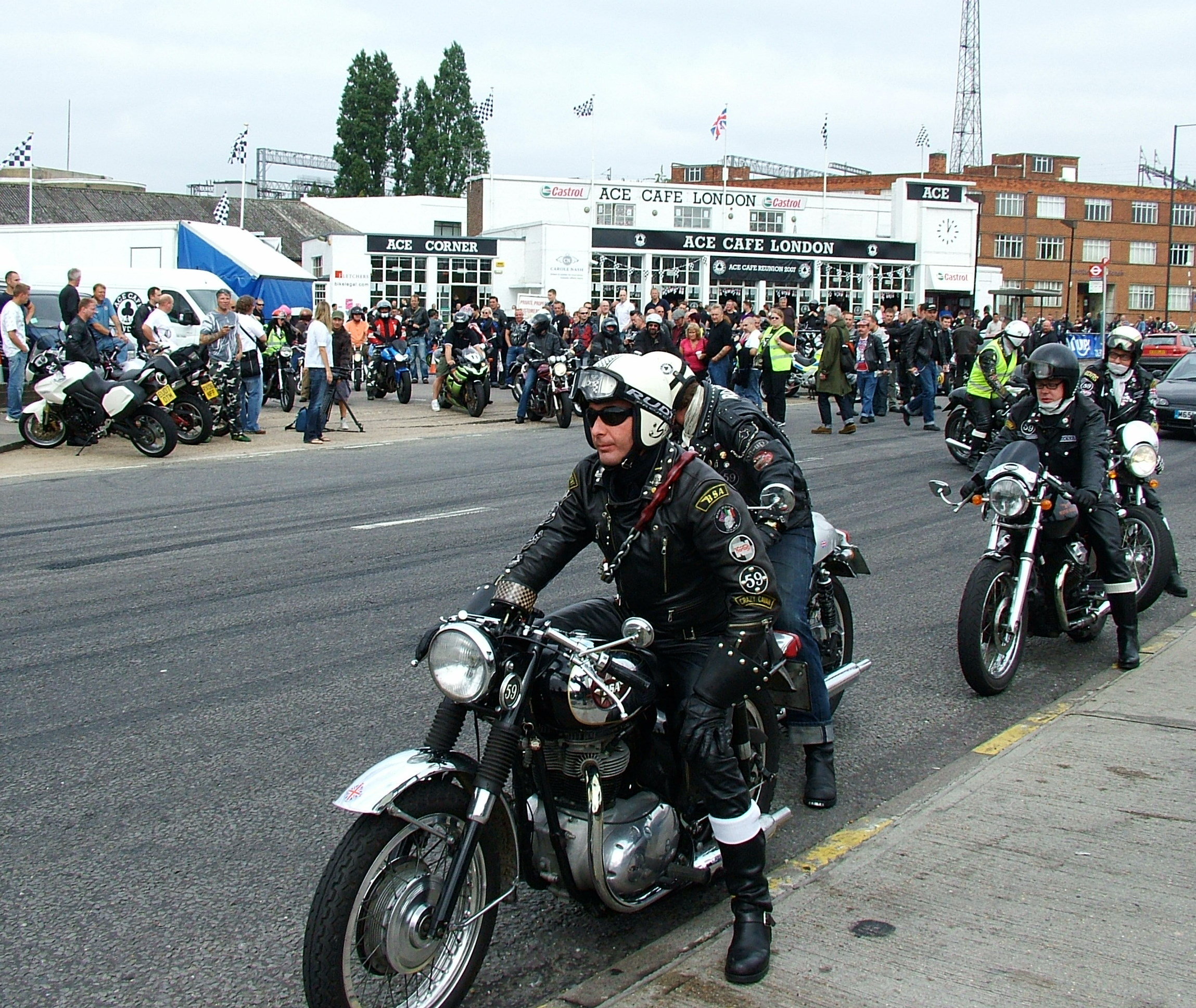
BSA riders at an Ace Cafe reunion in 2007

- Ace Cafe, on the North Circular Road in London, England
- Cook's Corner is a bar and restaurant located in Trabuco Canyon, Orange County, California
- Dinosaur Bar-B-Que is a chain in New York and New Jersey
- Full Throttle Saloon near in Vale, South Dakota has been described as the world's largest biker bar
- Hogs and Heifers in New York City from 1992 to 2015
- Hurley Mountain Inn in Hurley, New York was a biker bar until a New York State Police barracks was built across the street
- Johnny's Bar in Hollister, California was a historical biker bar
- The Rock Store in Cornell, California

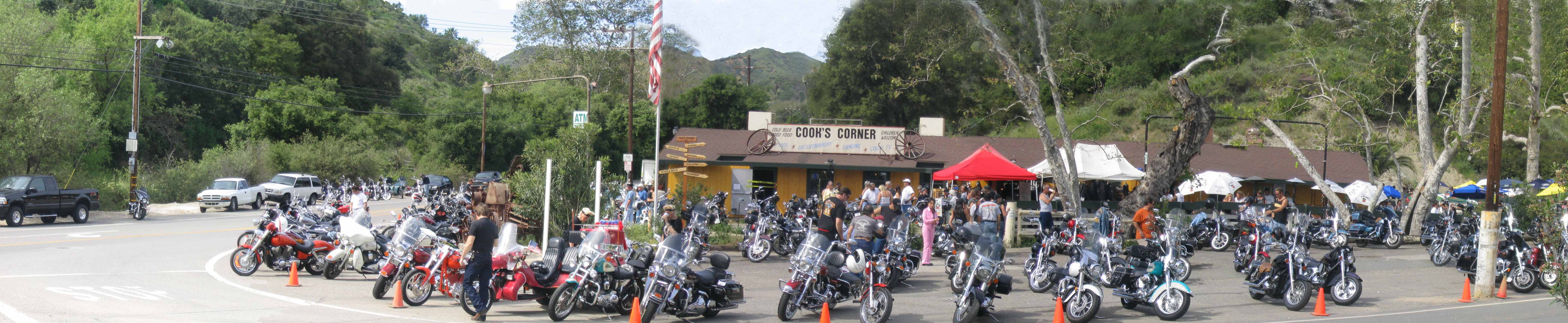
Motorcycles at Cook's Corner, a biker bar

== See also ==
- Sturgis Motorcycle Rally
  - Buffalo Chip Campground
- Types of drinking establishments

== Bibliography ==
- Wolf, Daniel R. (1991). The Rebels: A Brotherhood of Outlaw Bikers. University of Toronto Press. ISBN 0802073638.
