= St. Michael's Abbey =

Saint Michael's Abbey may refer to:

- St. Michael's Abbey, Antwerp
- St Michael's Abbey, Farnborough, England
- St. Michael's Abbey, Metten, Germany
- St. Michael's Abbey (Orange County, California), USA
- Abbey of St. Michael's, Munkalif, Norway
- Sacra di San Michele, Susa Valley, Italy
