= Shrine of Our Lady of Guadalupe =

Catholic shrine in La Crosse, Wisconsin, US

Coordinates: 43°45′17.2″N 91°10′45.8″W

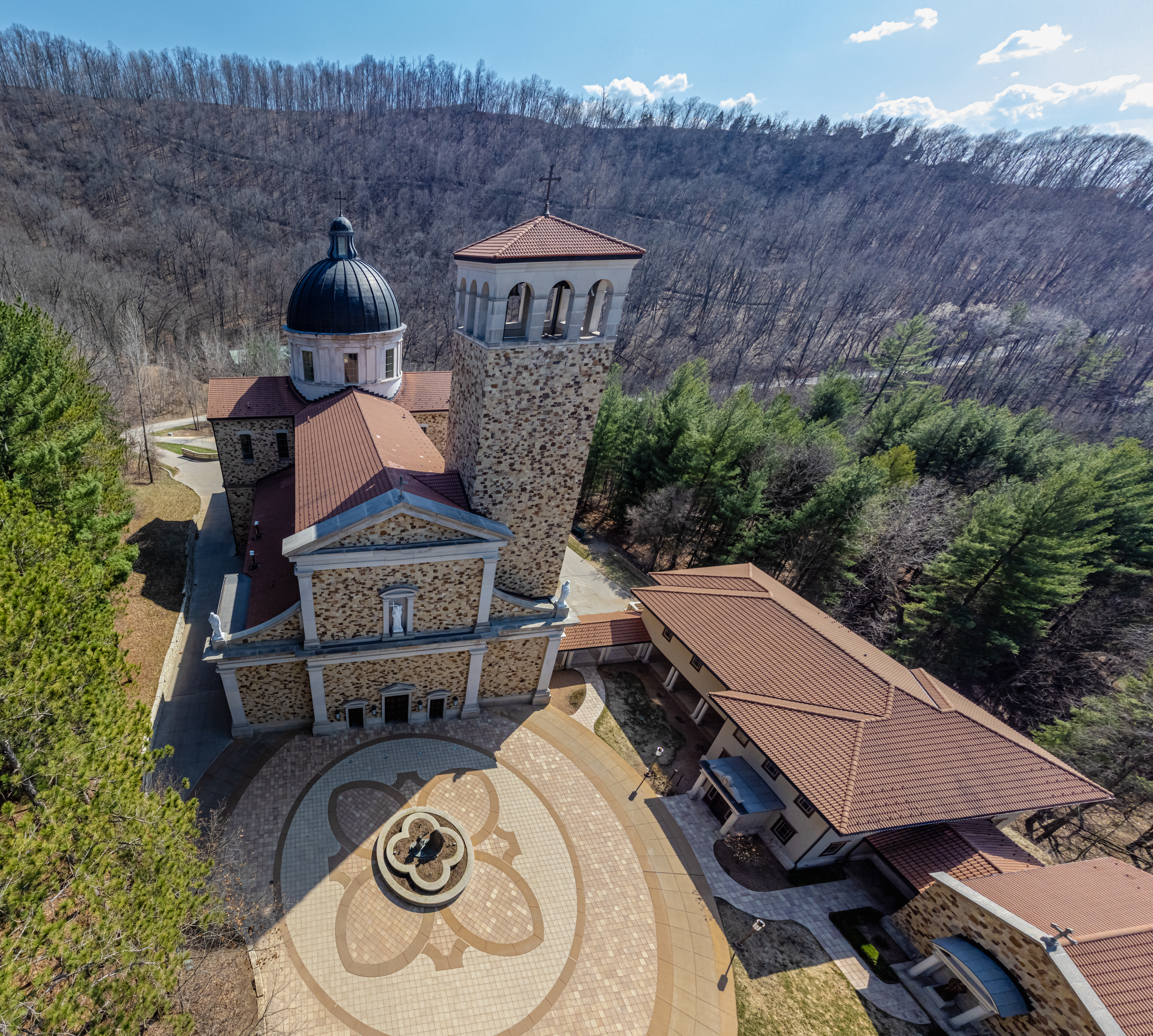

Religion
- Affiliation: Roman Catholic Church
- Diocese: Diocese of La Crosse
- Patron: Our Lady of Guadalupe

Location
- Location: La Crosse, Wisconsin, United States
- Interactive map of Shrine of Our Lady of Guadalupe

Architecture
- Architect: Duncan G. Stroik
- Style: New Classical
- Founder: Raymond Leo Burke
- Groundbreaking: 2004
- Completed: 2008

Website
- guadalupeshrine.org

Shrine of Our Lady of Guadalupe is a Catholic shrine located in La Crosse, Wisconsin. It is dedicated to the Blessed Virgin Mary under the title of Our Lady of Guadalupe. The 100-acre (0.40 km^{2}) grounds include a visitors' center and outdoor devotional areas such as a rosary walk, Stations of the Cross, and a votive candle chapel. Mass and the sacrament of Penance are celebrated daily by Norbertine canons of St. Michael's Abbey.

The construction of the shrine church began on May 13, 2004, with a dedication on July 31, 2008. The shrine was founded and later dedicated by Archbishop Raymond Leo Burke.

== History ==
The shrine was an inspiration of Cardinal Raymond Leo Burke, while he was Bishop of La Crosse, who wanted to establish a place of lasting worship for Roman Catholics to go on pilgrimage to in the Diocese of La Crosse. On September 28, 1999, a letter was sent for consideration to the Vatican, and on November 11, 1999, the Holy See gave the project its approval and blessing. 70 acres (280,000 m^{2}) of woodland near the south end of La Crosse were then donated by Robert and Lucille Swing. Groundbreaking began on June 17, 2001.

The first phase of construction included a Pilgrim Center, which features an orientation room, information desk, the Flores Mariae gift shop, and the Culina Mariana restaurant, and the Mother of Good Counsel Votive Candle Chapel. This phase was completed and dedicated December 12, 2002.

The second phase included an outdoor Stations of the Cross, a devotional area to Saint Joseph the Workman and a rosary walk, in addition to construction on the shrine church. Groundbreaking for the church was on May 13, 2004. The Stations of the Cross were dedicated December 9, 2004, followed by the devotional area to Saint Joseph the Workman on September 21, 2007, and the rosary walk on December 8, 2007.

Excavation for the third phase, the Memorial to the Unborn, began on October 29, 2007.

On July 31, 2008, the shrine church was dedicated. The dedication Mass was also presided over by Burke, who by then had been named Prefect of the Supreme Tribunal of the Apostolic Signatura, having previously served as Archbishop of Saint Louis and before that as Bishop of La Crosse, and who would be named a Cardinal in 2010. Burke was joined by Cardinals Justin Francis Rigali of Philadelphia, who had previously served as Archbishop of Saint Louis before Burke was named as his successor, and Francis Eugene George of Chicago, the closest cardinalatial see to La Crosse. The ceremony included an honor guard made up of members of the local area Knights of Columbus and Knights and Ladies of the Holy Sepulchre. Also in attendance were over 100 priests, and members of the St. Juan Diego Guild and Marian Catechist Apostolate.

The Memorial to the Unborn was completed on December 12, 2008, and was also dedicated by Archbishop Burke.

In August 2021, the Norbertine canons of St. Michael's Abbey took over pastoral care of the shrine from the Franciscan Friars of the Immaculate.

== Shrine church ==
=== Architecture ===
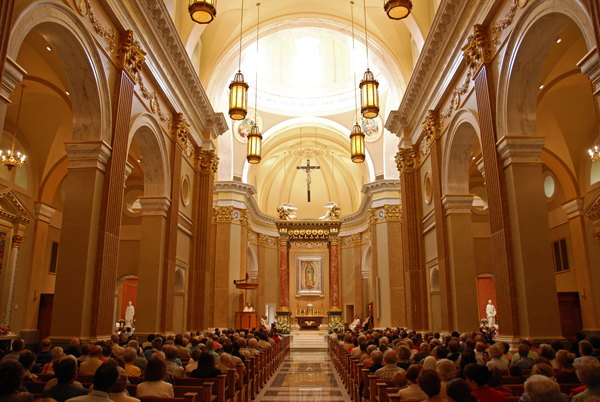
The Shrine of Our Lady of Guadalupe

The shrine church was designed by the New Classical architect Duncan G. Stroik, in collaboration with River Architects. The architecture is in Italian Renaissance style, one of the first Catholic structures to be designed in such a way in 50 years. The exterior is made of stone from Minnesota and Wisconsin, designed to recall buildings of Tuscany.

=== Interior ===
In July 2011 Pope Benedict XVI affiliated the shrine church to the papal basilica of St. Mary Major in Rome, which inspired much of the interior design.

The floor plan is a cruciform with a large narthex and an ambulatory connecting the nave to two sacristies. The interior of the sanctuary was designed to look like a high renaissance or baroque church. The marble was supplied by Twin City Tile & Marble Co. of St. Paul, Minnesota. The pews, doors and other woodwork are of mahogany provided by Heebink Architectural Woodwork of Baldwin, Wisconsin.

Art work was a collaboration of many artists and includes a variety of styles. The decorative painting and ornamental plastering was done by the John Canning Company of Connecticut with moldings crafted by Felber Ornamental Plastering Corp. of Norristown, Pennsylvania. The dome ceiling features a turquoise sky with gold-leaf constellations composed with assistance from astronomers at the Talcott Mountain Science Center in Avon, Connecticut. The dome is intended to replicate the night sky on the Winter Solstice as viewed from Mexico City in 1531. Thirty-one stained-glass windows were created and installed by Rohlf's Stained & Leaded Glass Studio of Mt. Vernon, New York.

A fresco inside the narthex inside the main entrance painted by Anthony Visco is titled “Visions of Guadalupe.” The images are of the apparitions of Mary to Juan Diego from the time of his approach to the hill of Tepeyac until the time of the healing of his uncle. Surrounding the outside the fresco are images of workers of the faith.

On the aisles inside the church are six paintings of saints, five of whom lived in the 20th century: Peregrine Laziosi, Gianna Beretta Molla, Miguel Pro, and Thérèse of Lisieux were painted by Neilson Carlin, and Faustina Kowalska and Divine Mercy and Maria Goretti by Noah Buchanan. There are also three paintings by Brett Edenton in the lower narthex of the church that depict Samuel Mazzuchelli, Frederic Baraga, and Solanus Casey.

=== Sculptures ===
The many sculptures inside and outside the church were sculpted in Italy of Carrara marble. Outside the church above the entrance is a statue of Jesus the Good Shepherd, to his right St. Peter, and to his left St. Paul. In the middle of the plaza is a statue of Juan Diego showing his tilma to Bishop Zumárraga.

Inside the church are statues in each of the transepts. The south transept holds statues of the Immaculate Heart of Mary and of Juan Diego. In the north transept are statues of the Sacred Heart of Jesus and of St. Joseph and Jesus.

=== Mosaic ===
The sanctuary of the church contains a mosaic of Our Lady of Guadalupe, created by The Vatican Mosaic Studio. The mosaic measures 9 ft (2.7 m) in height and 6 ft (1.8 m) in width.

== Relics ==
=== 1st Class relics ===
- Miguel Pro - in the altar of the church and in the side-aisle shrine
- Kateri Tekakwitha - in the altar of the church
- Therese of Lisieux- in the side-aisle shrine under the painting by Neilson Carlin
- Peregrine Laziosi - in the side-aisle shrine under the painting by Neilson Carlin
- Maria Goretti - in the side-aisle shrine
- Faustina Kowalska - in the side-aisle shrine
- Gianna Beretta Molla - in the side-aisle shrine

== The grounds ==
The shrine is handicap accessible, with motorized carts and volunteers to assist people with mobility challenges.

The Stations of the Cross were designed by Anthony Visco and done in bronze relief. The Rosary Walk has four alcoves, with each alcove made up of five blue tiles, each depicting a mystery of the rosary. The alcoves were also designed by Visco.

=== Saint Joseph the Workman devotional area ===
This area includes a fountain and a bronze relief designed by Anthony Brankin showing Saint Joseph the Workman instructing Jesus. Background images depict Archbishop Burke, founder of the shrine, and Mr. and Mrs. Robert Swing, donors of the land. The Saint Joseph the Workman Devotional Area was dedicated September 21, 2007.

=== Saint Kateri Tekakwitha devotional area ===
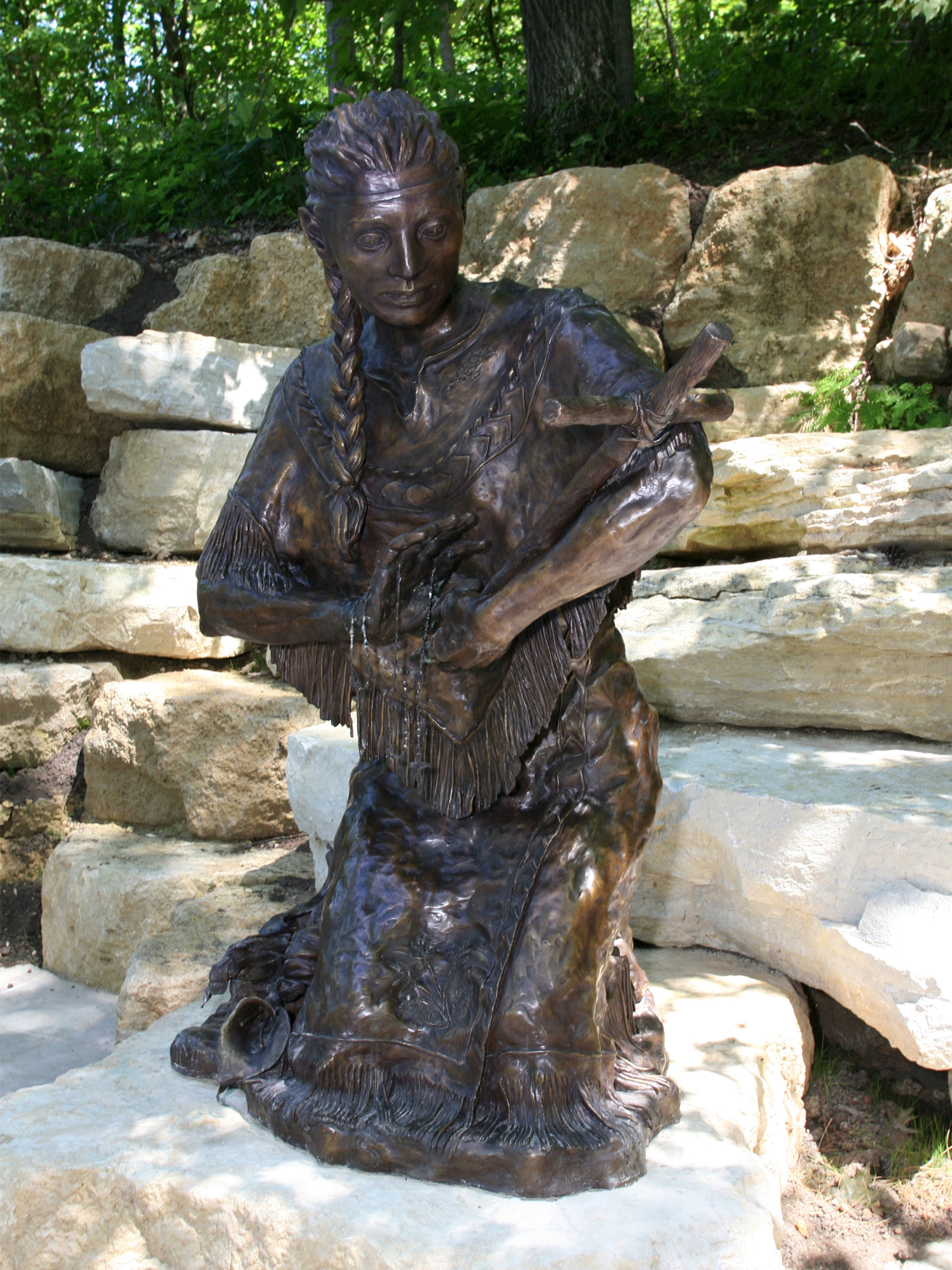
Statue of Saint Kateri Tekakwitha by Cynthia Hitschler

This secluded devotional area features a larger-than-life-sized bronze statue of Kateri Tekakwitha, Lily of the Mohawks, by artist Cynthia Hitschler. It was dedicated July 30, 2008. The work depicts Kateri in native buckskin in a natural setting, kneeling in reverence to a rough, hand-made cross, with a basket at her side filled with strawberries, a calla lily and the three "sister" plants; corn, squash and beans.

=== Memorial to the Unborn ===
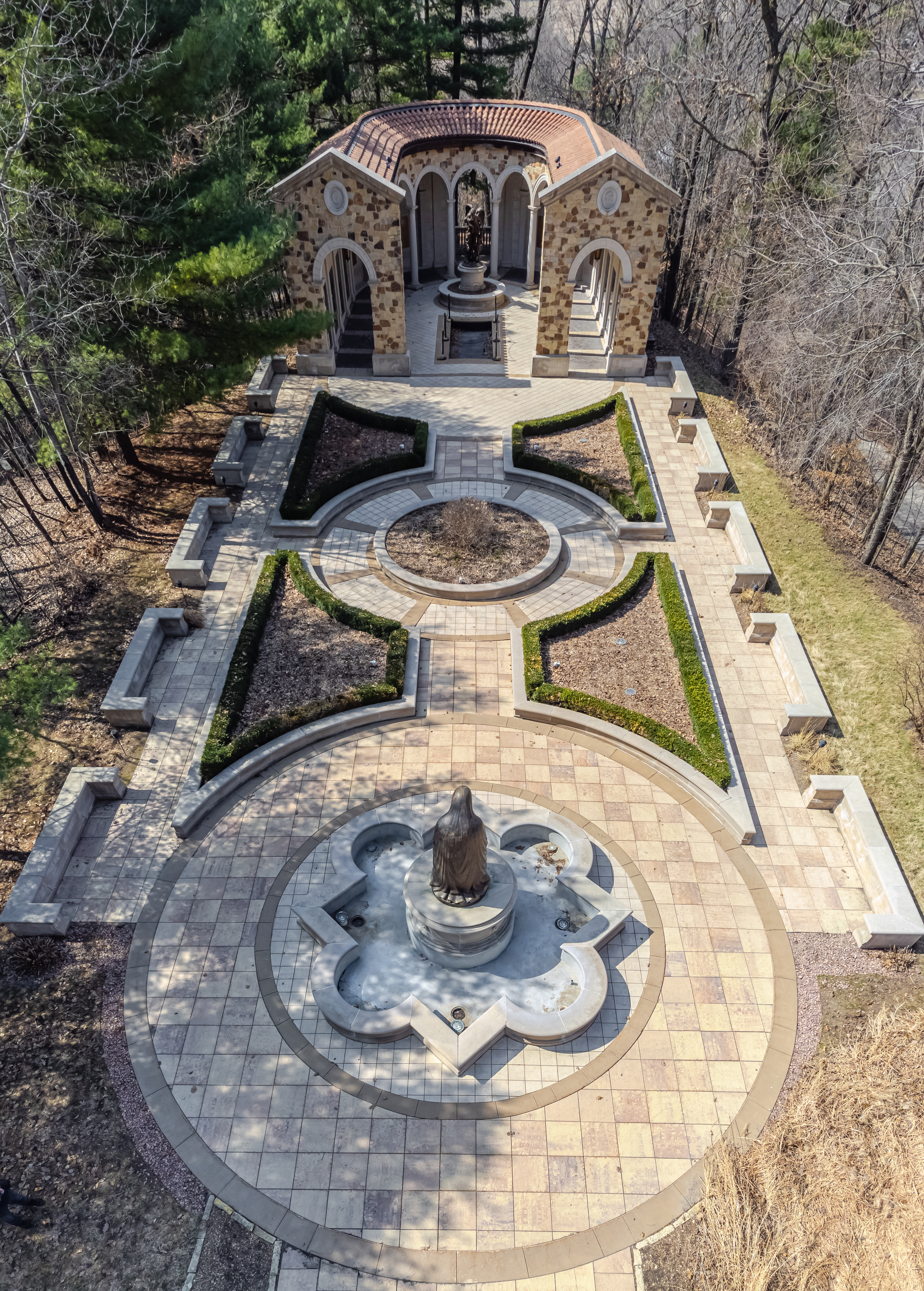
Memorial to the Unborn

The Memorial to the Unborn arcade provides a means of memorializing unborn children and providing a place of spiritual healing and closure for parents, relatives and friends. Also, there is a series of plaques that present teachings of the Catholic Church on abortion, contraception, embryonic stem cell research, and the dignity of the human person. The memorial was designed by River Architects.

=== Mother of Good Counsel Votive Candle Chapel ===
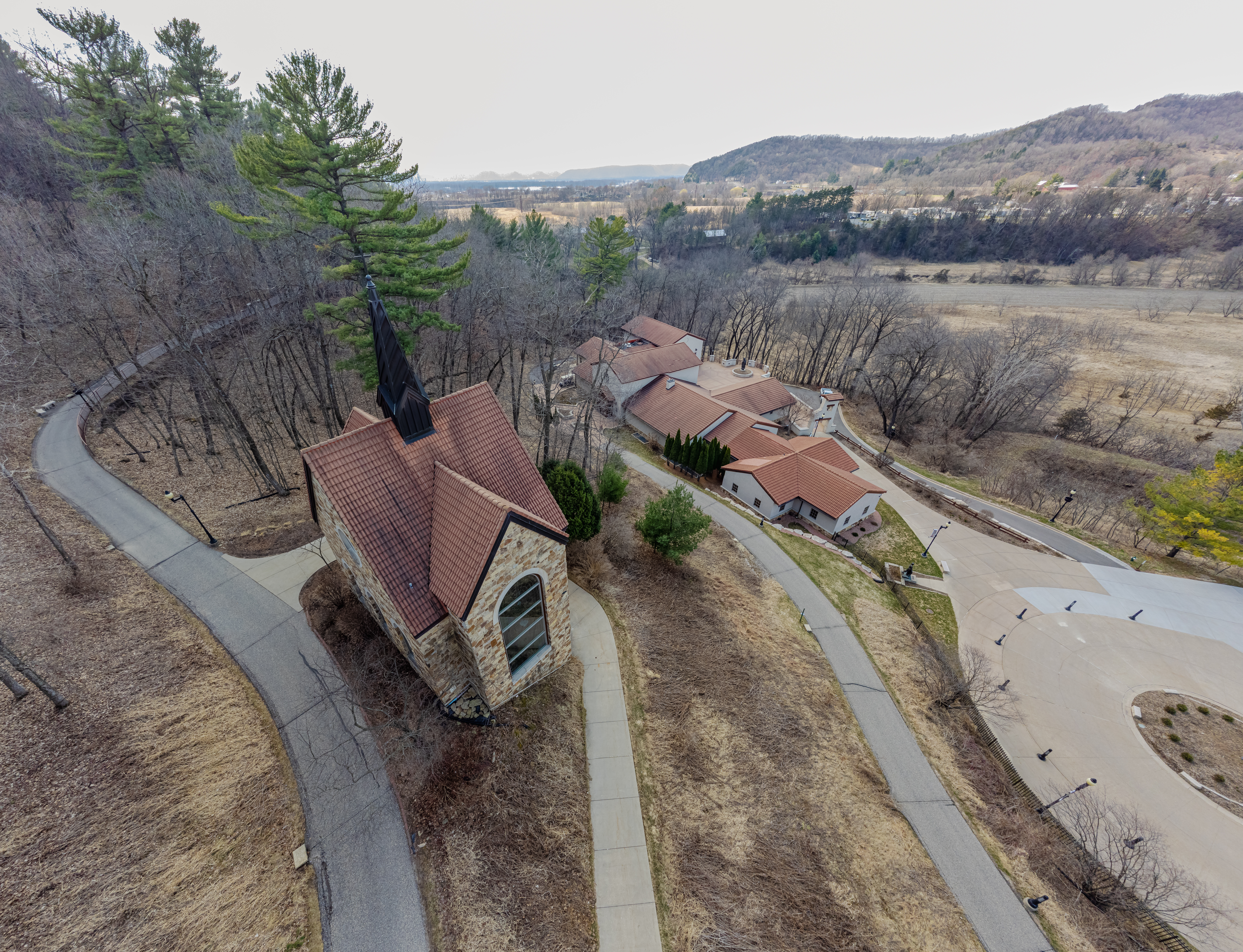
Votive Candle Capel and Pilgrim Center entrance

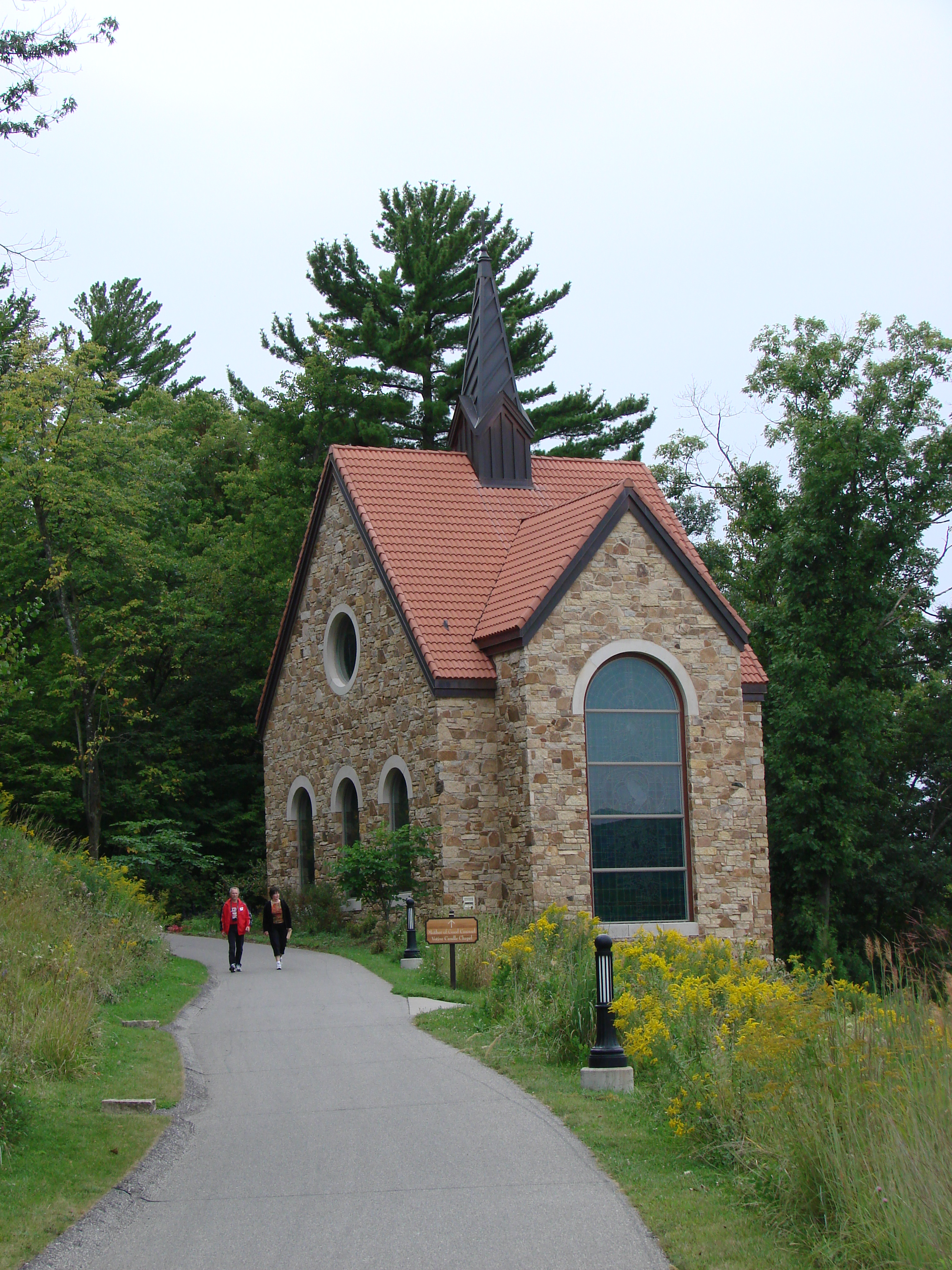
Votive Chapel

The Mother of Good Counsel Votive Candle Chapel contains 576 votive candles. It is surrounded by seven stained glass windows, designed by Willet-Hauser Stained Glass Studio, each depicting a different title or apparition of Our Lady. The central candle structure measures 14 feet (4.3 m) high, and 12 feet (3.7 m) across.

=== Culina Mariana Café ===
The Culina Mariana Café is a European bistro style restaurant located in the Pilgrim Center.

=== Flores Mariae Gift Shop ===
The Flores Mariae is a gift shop in the Pilgrim Center that provides literature about the Catholic faith and other religious items.

=== See also ===
- Peter Fehlner, former rector
- Holy Hill National Shrine of Mary, Help of Christians, Erin, Wisconsin
- National Shrine of Our Lady of Champion, Green Bay, Wisconsin
