= St. Michael's Preparatory School (Silverado, California) =

Private school in Silverado, California, United States

St. Michael's Abbey Preparatory School
- Shield of St. Michael's Prep

Location
- 27977 Silverado Canyon Road; Silverado, (Orange County), California 92676; United States; 33°40′53″N 117°37′2″W

Information
- Type: Private, Boarding school, College-prep
- Religious affiliation: Roman Catholic
- Established: 1961
- Founder: Fr. Ladislas Parker, O.Praem. (Dec 19, 1915 – January 3, 2010); Fr. Hubert Szanto, O.Praem. (1925–2010)
- Closed: 2020
- Oversight: Norbertine Fathers from St. Michael's Abbey
- CEEB code: 052273
- Headmaster: Fr. Victor Szczurek, O.Praem.
- Teaching staff: 17
- Grades: 9-12
- Gender: Boys
- Average class size: 12
- Student to teacher ratio: 5:1
- Colors: Blue and gold
- Athletics: Cross Country, Football, Soccer, Baseball
- Athletics conference: CIF Southern Section; Express League
- Team name: Pioneers, later Archangels
- Accreditation: Western Association of Schools and Colleges, Western Catholic Educational Association (WCEA).
- Yearbook: Vantage
- Tuition: $23,785
- Dress Code: White Shirt, Gray Pants, Navy Coat, Blue/Gold Tie, Black Shoes
- Website: www.stmichaelsprep.org

Saint Michael's Preparatory School was a private, Roman Catholic, college preparatory boys' boarding school in Silverado, California. It was located in the Roman Catholic Diocese of Orange.

It was owned and operated by the Norbertine Fathers of St. Michael's Abbey, who established it in 1961 as St. Michael's Junior Seminary and Novitiate. The school was closed in June 2020 due to the Abbey moving to a new location.

== Faith ==
St. Michael's was run by the Norbertine Order. An abbey school, it adjoined a community of 60 priests, many of whom taught at the school.

Religious Education was compulsory for all students, as was daily attendance at morning mass before breakfast and night prayer after supper. Studies in Latin were also mandatory, except for the students who take Spanish.

== Academics ==
St. Michael's Prep offered a classical sequence of courses at College Prep, Honors, and Advanced Placement levels. It was the only boarding school to rank among the top fifty Catholic high schools in the nation.

St. Michael's was considered a highly selective high school. 100% of its graduates go on to institutions of higher learning.

== Character ==
St. Michael's educated young men in fidelity to the Catholic tradition. It was exclusively a boarding school.

Good behavior was enforced among the students through the "conduct grade" which directly impacted student GPA, and a system of prefects called "roomleaders".

Most students participated in one or more sports. These include cross country and football in the fall, soccer in the winter, and baseball in the spring. Underclassmen who do not participated in a sport must take the physical education class. The school mascot was the Pioneer.

Each year during Christmas vacation, the Junior class traveled to Rome for two weeks under the supervision of several teachers and parent chaperones.

== History ==
St. Michael's Abbey was founded in 1961 by seven priests from the Norbertine Abbey of St. Michael in Csorna, Hungary, whose roots go back to the 12th century. The Norbertine priests in the 1940s were well-established teachers in the national educational system of Hungary that encompassed religious and secular schools alike. All private schools, however, were nationalized by 1948. Two groups of priests from the Norbertine Abbey of Csorna fled their native land on separated July nights in 1950. Shortly thereafter, their religious community was suppressed. On the night of July 11, 1950, word came to the Abbey in Csorna that the police would arrive the next day to arrest the conferred and suppress the community. Seven priests left that night in two groups to hike across country to the Austrian border.

The Hungarian refugees emigrated to America. Arriving in New York in 1952, they were welcomed by the Abbey of St. Norbert in De Pere, Wisconsin, with whom they worked for several years, saving money to begin their own monastery. At the invitation of Cardinal McIntyre, archbishop of Los Angeles, they first moved to Santa Ana, California in 1957 and taught at Mater Dei High School, establishing a monastic community the next year. The founding abbot was the Rt. Rev. Ladislaus Parker, O.Praem. The exiled saw the move to Orange County, California as their chance to establish a new foundation.

In December 1958, Cardinal McIntyre gave his consent to the Fathers establishing their own foundation. This would be fueled by their desire to perpetuate the religious and educational heritage of their native Csorna. Under the leadership of Fr. Ladislas Parker, the Fathers invested their savings in purchasing property in Silverado, California.

Fr. Hubert Szanto joined Fr. Parker to open St. Michael's Junior Seminary and Novitiate in September 1961. St. Michael's opened this Junior Seminary in 1962, which would evolve into the present-day Preparatory School.

Rapid changes in American society and in the Roman Catholic Church prompted Fr. Parker to petition Cardinal McIntyre to allow the school to introduce a parallel college preparatory program for lay students.

When the 1970s began, St. Michael's was flourishing more as a high school than as a seminary. As the number of those interested in the priesthood at the high school level continued to dwindle, the parallel programs gradually merged into one. Over time, educational programs similar to St. Michael's were closing. By 1995, St. Michael's Prep became the only institution where Catholic, secondary education was available in the entire Western United States for those seeking to study in an all-boys, residential environment.

In 1998, due to heavy rains, part of the grounds collapsed, leading the community to begin planning to relocate both the abbey and the school. Those plans resulted in buying a local ranch in 2012. Fundraising for the construction of the new abbey completed in 2018, and construction was expected to take 2 years. The school closed in June 2020 as part of the move, and the new abbey was dedicated in May 2021. The Archangel Institute, a part-time study course at St. Michael's, provides faith formation education for high school boys until a new school is built.

The former property of the school was listed for sale at $18.5 million dollars in 2020.
