= St. Michael's Abbey (Orange County, California) =

Norbertine monastery in Silverado, California

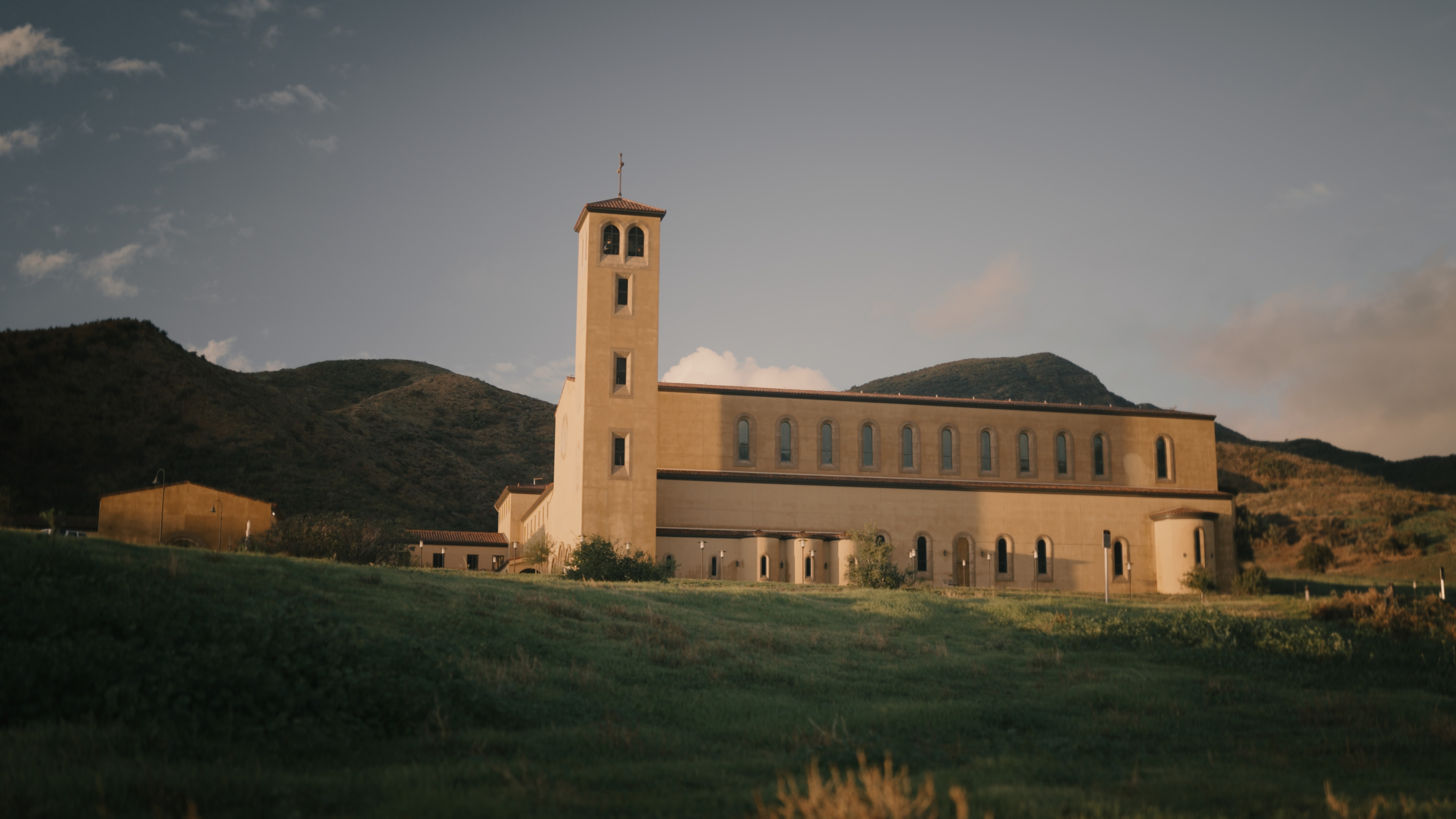
- The abbey church of Our Lady of the Assumption at St. Michael's Abbey

- Location within California Location within the United States

Monastery information
- Order: Order of Canons Regular of Prémontré
- Established: 1961
- Mother house: St. Michael's Abbey, Csorna, Hungary
- Dedication: Saint Michael the Archangel and the Assumption of the Blessed Virgin Mary
- Diocese: Orange

People
- Founder: Ladislaus Parker
- Abbot: John Caronan

Site
- Location: Silverado, California
- Coordinates: 33°40′52″N 117°37′02″W
- Public access: Yes
- Website: stmichaelsabbey.com

Insignia of the monastery

St. Michael's Abbey is a Norbertine Catholic monastery in Silverado, Orange County, California. The confreres of the abbey live a life combining both the monastic life with an active priestly ministry.

== History ==
=== Hungarian Origins ===
The Abbey was founded in 1961 by seven Norbertine confreres from the Norbertine Abbey of St. Michael in Csorna, Hungary, whose roots go back to the 12th century. The founders originally left Hungary to avoid oppression soon after Communist officials nationalized Catholic schools in 1948. On the night of 11 July 1950, word came to the abbey in Csorna that the police would arrive the next day to arrest the confreres and suppress the community. That night, seven priests left, in two groups, to hike across country to the Austrian border. Several of them arrived in New York in 1952, from which they made their way west, where they were welcomed by the Abbey of St. Norbert in De Pere, Wisconsin, with whom they lived for several years, saving money to begin their own monastery.

=== Foundation in California ===
At the invitation of Cardinal James Francis McIntyre, Archbishop of Los Angeles, they first moved to Santa Ana, California, in 1957 and taught at Mater Dei High School, establishing a monastic community the next year. The founding abbot was Ladislaus Parker, O.Praem. In 1960 the Norbertine Fathers purchased the site from Jack Cook, the founder of nearby Cook's Corner.

The canonry opened a junior seminary in 1962, which evolved into St. Michael's Preparatory School, a nationally renowned residential all-boys high school, which closed in 2020 with the move to the new monastery.

The status of abbey was conferred on St. Michael's in 1984.

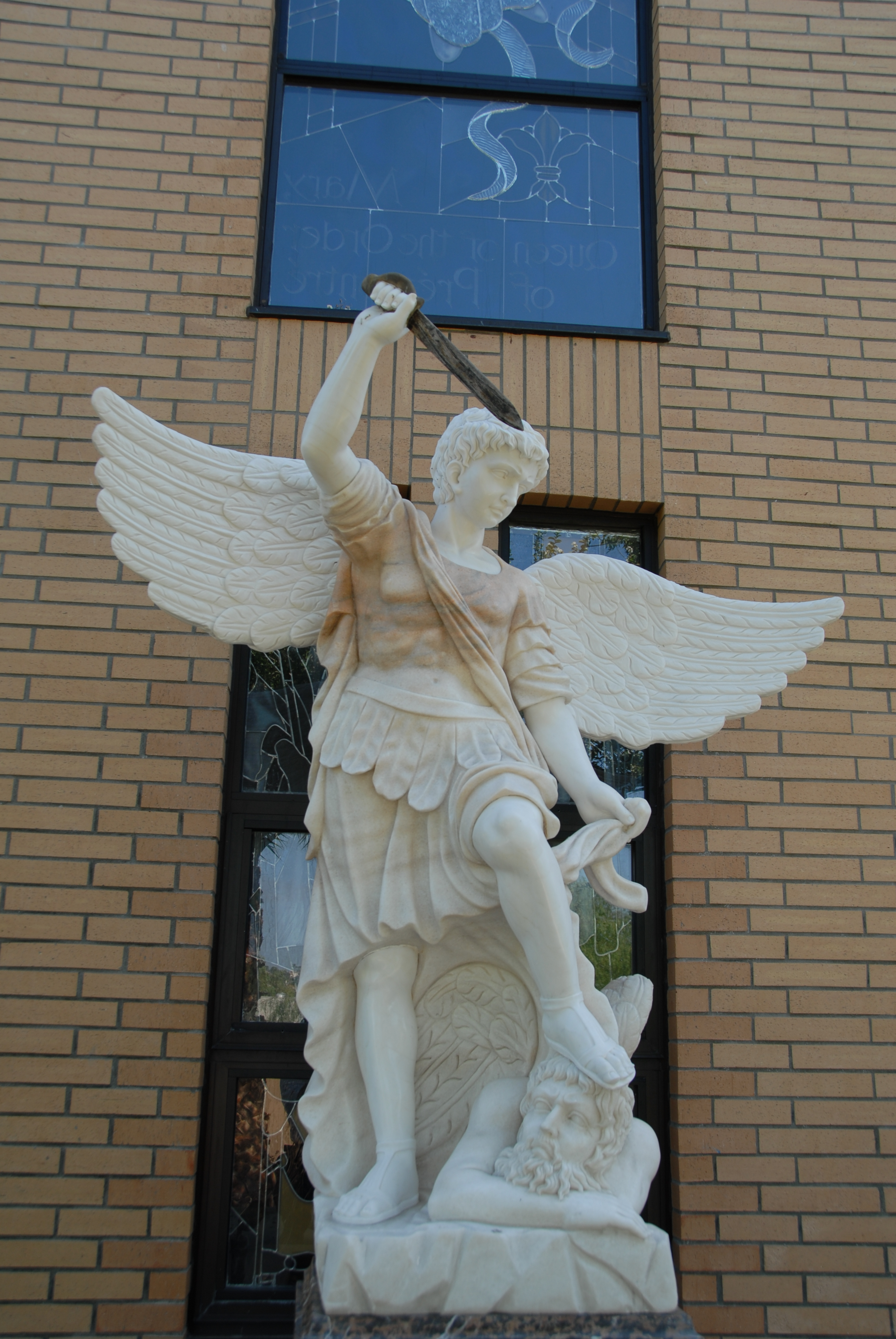
Statue of St. Michael at the Abbey

=== Recent history ===
The third and current abbot is John Caronan. He was elected for a twelve-year term as abbot on June 19, 2026, succeeding Eugene Hayes.

More recently, plans have developed for an expansion project to develop a new site, due in part to geological instability at the current Abbey. In the early part of 2018, the building campaign attained its goal of $120 million. The groundbreaking for the new abbey took place at the site of 327 acres in Silverado Canyon on 18 March 2018.

==== Bethlehem Priory ====
In 1997 the abbey founded a monastery of Norbertine canonesses regular in Tehachapi, California. On 29 January 2011, the sisters' community in Tehachapi was incorporated into the worldwide Norbertine Order. In a ceremony at St. John the Baptist Cathedral in Fresno, the first nine sisters made their solemn profession as members of the newly established Canonry of the Bethlehem Priory of St. Joseph, in the hands of the Norbertine Abbot General, Thomas Handgratinger. Their total membership is 20 canonesses, the majority of whom are still in stages of formation before perpetual vows. In that same ceremony the Abbot of St. Michael's Abbey was named the Father Abbot of the Sisters' Canonry and as such serves as their external superior.

==== 2021 Move ====
In January 2021, at the start of the 900th anniversary year of the founding of the Norbertine Order, the community of St. Michael's Abbey moved from its original location on El Toro Road to its new location: 327 acres on Silverado Canyon Road, 8 miles away. With the new facility came a new worship space as well, the Church of Our Lady of the Assumption. Both the abbey and the church were dedicated on 4 May 2021.

==== Diocese of Springfield in Illinois ====
In a statement on 1 March 2022, the fathers of St Michael Abbey announced plans to establish a community in the Diocese of Springfield in Illinois and the creation of the Evermode Institute, a center for Catholic spiritual and intellectual formation. The community will be known as the Corpus Christi Priory. The Institute will be named after St. Evermode of Ratzeburg, a close collaborator of St. Norbert. The Institute will be located at the site of the former Chiara Center on the grounds of the Hospital Sisters of St. Francis in Springfield, which the Diocese took control of June 2021 and will focus on intellectual and spiritual formation of those who teach the faith in the Diocese, such as catechists and parish schoolteachers.

Corpus Christi Priory officially opened on July 1, 2023.

==== Shrine of Our Lady of Guadalupe ====
In August 2021, it was announced that the confreres would be caring for the spiritual needs of pilgrims at the Shrine of Our Lady of Guadalupe in La Crosse, Wisconsin, replacing the Franciscan Friars of the Immaculate.

== Vocational formation ==
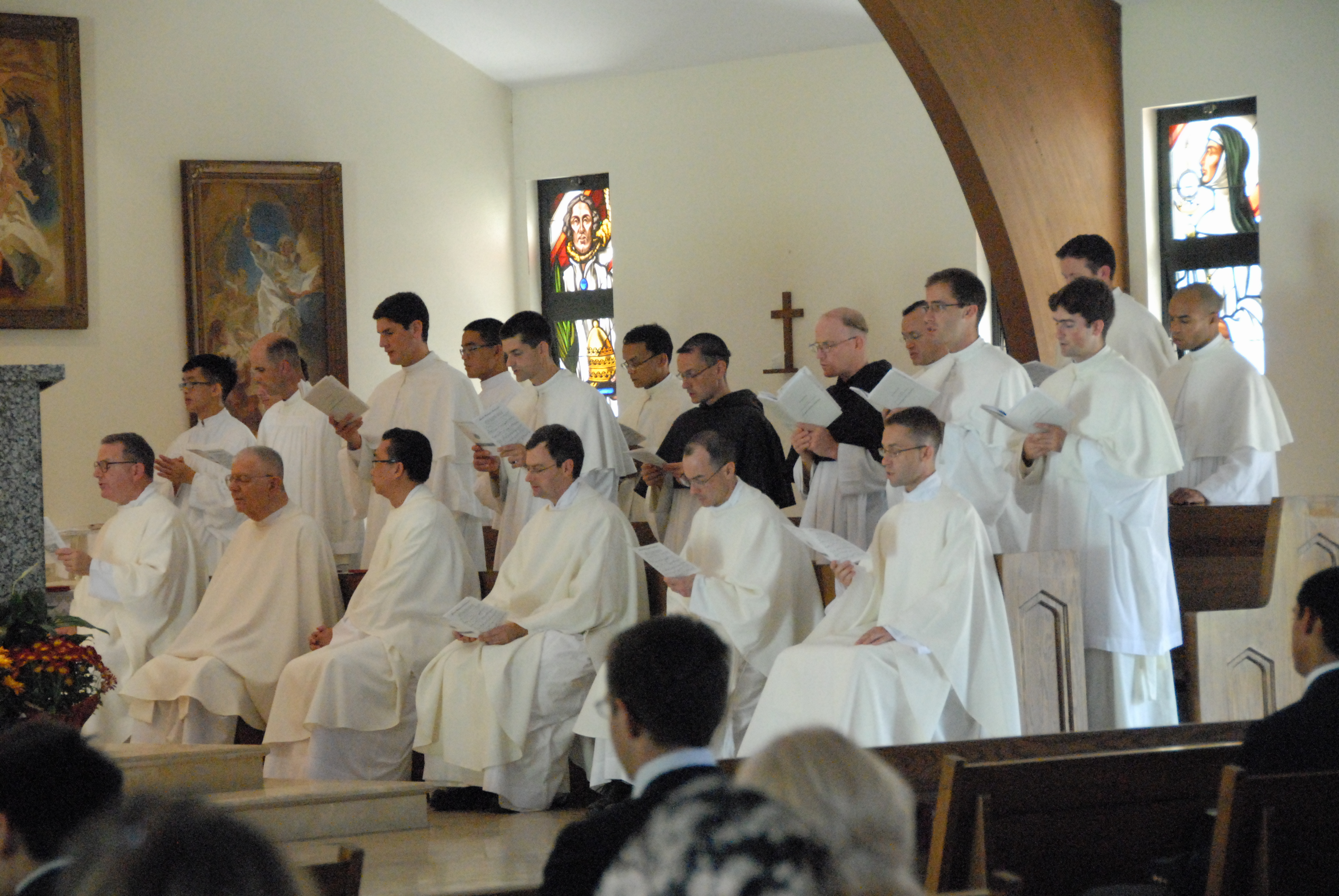
Canons in the Choir

St. Michael's Abbey accepts candidates who are between the ages of 18 and 29. The initial four years are spent in the monastery, studying the required novitiate courses followed by a two-year cycle in Thomistic philosophy, after which the seminarians are sent to study at St Philip's Seminary in Toronto, Canada, under the direction of the fathers of the Toronto Oratory. Upon completion of the three-year course in theology the students are granted the masters in theology degree. Prior to theological studies or immediately after there is typically a one-year apostolic experience. Following solemn profession all an additional year of studies in Rome while living at the Norbertine Generalate and pursuing courses in pastoral theology at the Angelicum, the pontifical university under the direction of the Dominican Order. The association between the Abbey and the Angelicum dates back to 1973. At the conclusion of this formation the confreres may then be ordained as deacons and then priests before beginning to serve in the various ministries of the Order.

The members of the abbey wear the traditional white habit of the Premonstratensian Order.

== Ministries ==
Priests of the Abbey serve in five dioceses in Southern California: Fresno, Los Angeles, Orange, San Bernardino and San Diego. Priests of the Abbey serve in high schools, parishes, offer retreats and spiritual direction.

Activities of the Abbey also include local parish ministry. An annual summer camp gives local youth a chance to experience the religious life of the monastery.

St. Michael's Abbey is an affiliate of the Institute on Religious Life. Roughly half of the nearly 100 members live at the monastery itself with the rest living in dependent houses.

== Liturgy ==
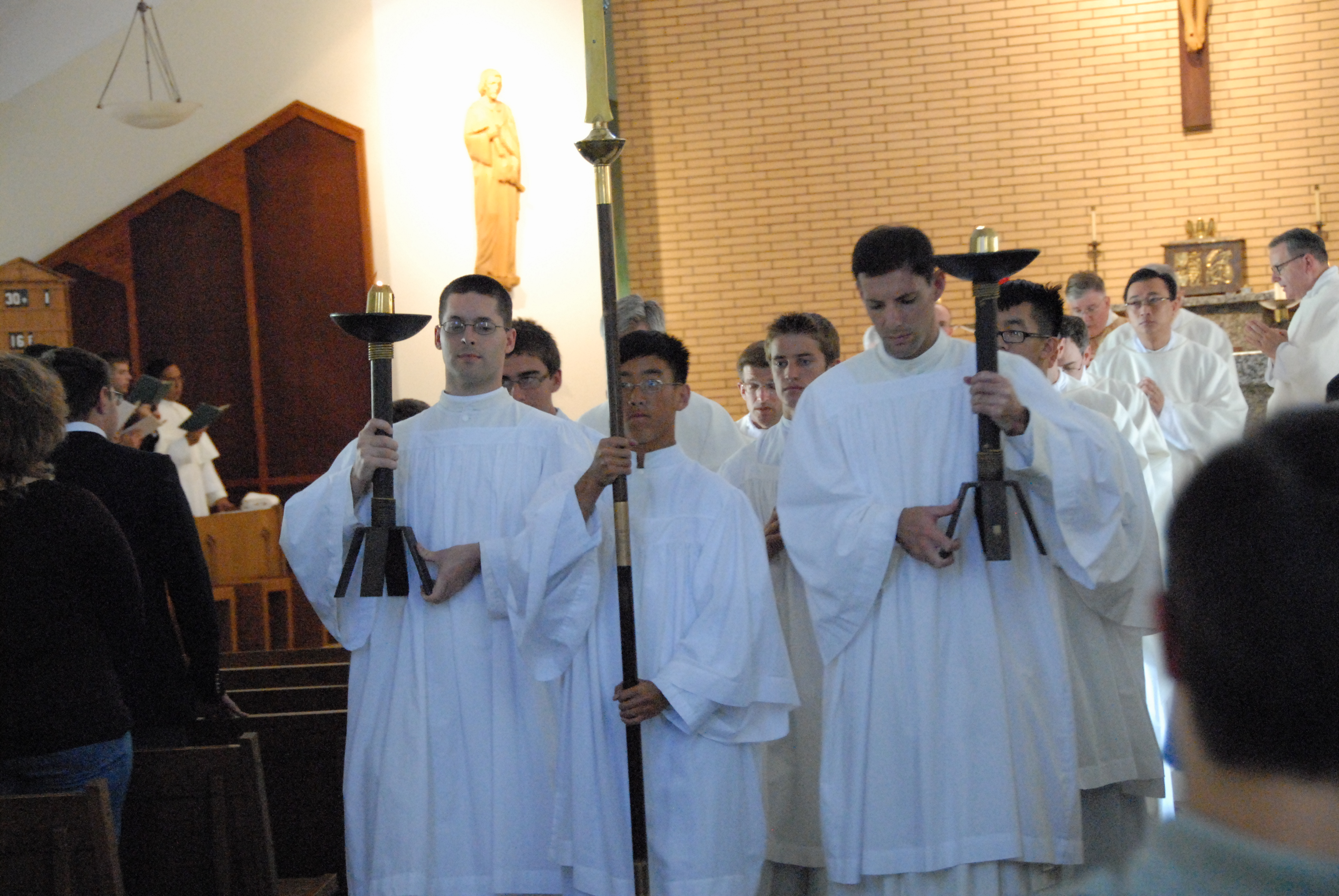
Liturgical Procession

Upon the conclusion of the Second Vatican Council, St. Michael's founding Abbot, Ladislaus Parker, O.Praem. (19 Dec 1915 – 3 January 2010), decided "to hold steadfast to all that was good in the old and not to shy away either from that which is new." The Abbey is well known for its use of Latin Chant, of which four albums have been released.
