= Cook's Corner =

Building in California, United States

Coordinates: 33°41′02″N 117°37′13″W

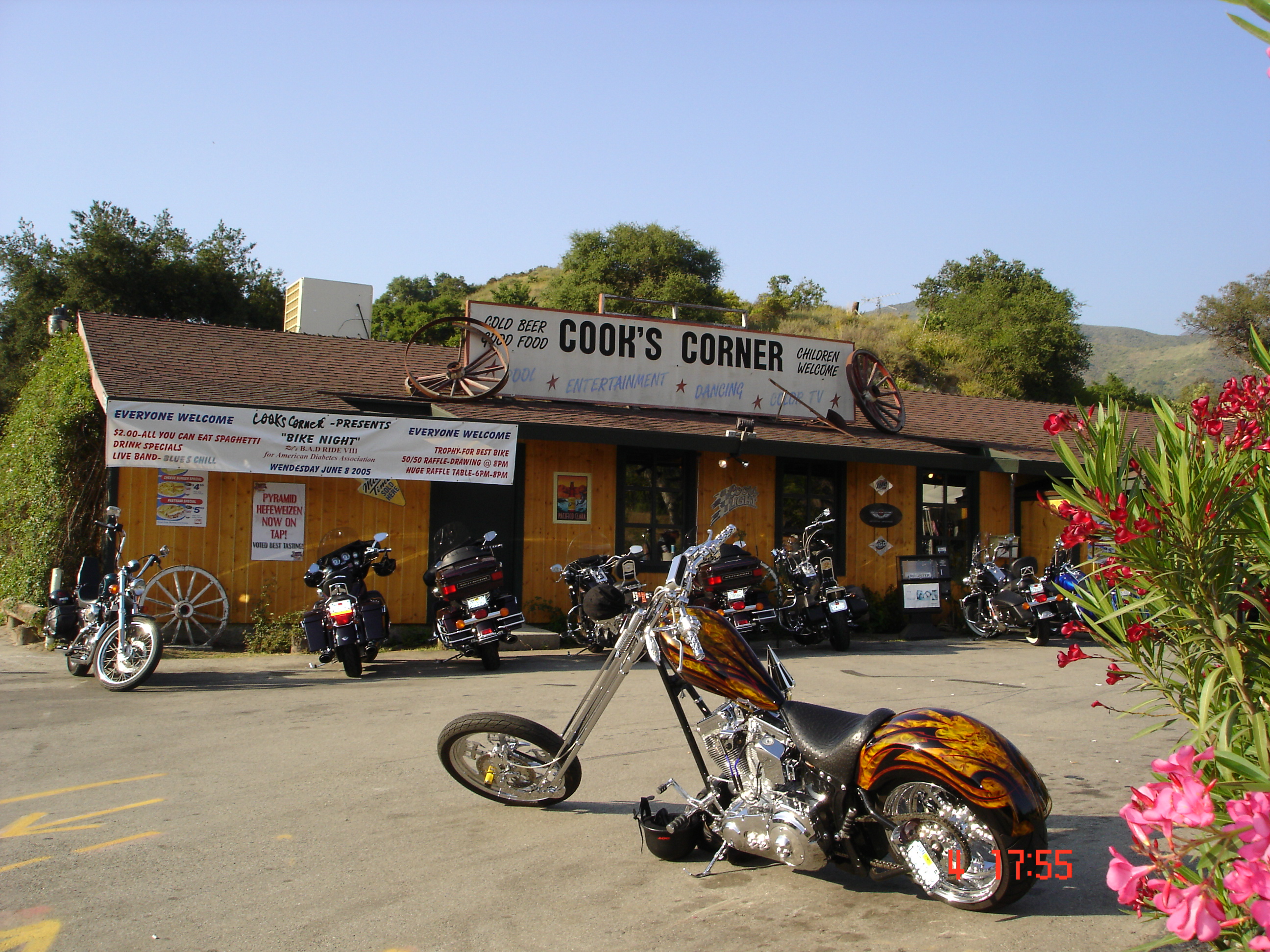
- Bikes in front of Cook's Corner, c. 2005
- Interactive map of Cook's Corner

Restaurant information
- Established: 1884
- Food type: American
- Dress code: Casual
- Location: 19152 Santiago Canyon Rd, Trabuco Canyon, California, 92679, United States

Cook's Corner is an Orange County, California bar built in 1884 that is popular with motorcyclists. It is located between the city of Lake Forest and the unincorporated community of Silverado. Cook's Corner is situated in Trabuco Canyon, California at the three-way intersection of El Toro Road, Santiago Canyon Road and Live Oak Canyon Road.

== History ==
The building is named for Andrew Jackson Cook, a merchant who acquired 190 acres (77 ha) of land in the South Orange County area after serving as a private in the CSA in Springfield, Missouri, making fortunes through raids, which helped the western expansion to California. The building was constructed not long after, in 1884. In 1926, Cook's son, Earl Jack "E.J." Cook, converted the structure into a restaurant meant to supply food to miners and local ranchers. Seven years later, after the end of the Prohibition period, alcohol began being sold again, and Cook's was converted into a bar.

The Cook family sold Cook's, which included the bar, the Cook's family house, and about 40 acres of land to two owners, Victor Villa and Volker Streicek, of the Santa Ana, California based motorcycle accessories company Cheat'ah Engineering in 1975. The Cook family purchased a ranch in Montana and moved out of Southern California. Volker and Victor had founded Cheat'ah Engineering in 1969, along with Ron Rondeau. They purchased Cook's as an investment, but also as a place where motorcycle clubs could gather in peace. Volker and Victor were proud of the fact that Cook's was a place to party with very few fights between motorcycle clubs and patrons. The owners established a policy where no motorcycle club colors were allowed at Cook's. Cook's became one of the more famous social places for bikers in Southern California.

Volker and his wife Shirley ran the bar in the late 70's, before moving to Colorado. Victor and Volker sold Cook's in the 1980s. Volker died on March 29, 2011, in Kelowna, British Columbia, Canada. Victor still lives in Southern California.

== Cook's today ==
Today's Cook's Corner is a wooden structure similar to a World War II-era restaurant and bar, built inside a former Santa Ana Army Air Base mess hall that was moved to the site. The property includes a pool table, indoor and outdoor music stages, an outdoor recreational area for horseshoe games, as well as trails for mountain biking and hiking. The majority of bikers come to Cook's Corner on the weekends, when Cook's hosts live music performances. On the first Sunday of May each year, about 2,000 come for the annual Blessing of the Bikes given by a priest of nearby St. Michael's Abbey. In May 2006, Governor Arnold Schwarzenegger made a stop in Orange County, and ate at Cook's Corner. During the California wildfires of October 2007, newscasters reporting on the Santiago Fire ate lunch at Cook's Corner, as well as firefighters working to control the blaze.

In May 2008, a small-scale landslide destroyed a large section of the famous outdoor patio. ABC 7 and NBC 4 were among some of the news teams that broadcast the event. Damages were somewhat minor, and the repairs took just a few days.

== Mass shooting ==
On August 23, 2023, a shooting occurred at the bar in which four people were killed (including the gunman) and six wounded. It was reported that an ex-Ventura Police officer had traveled to the bar to kill his ex-wife. He would later open fire with shots being called in between 6:40 and 7 pm (PST). The shooter was believed to have shot his wife in the bar and one bystander on the patio along with two bystanders in the street near the intersection of Live Oak Canyon Road and El Toro - Santiago Canyon Road. It was estimated that over 50 first responder vehicles had reported to the scene. The suspect, 59-year-old John Snowling, a retired Ventura County law enforcement officer, was pronounced deceased after reportedly being shot in a silver Toyota Tundra pickup truck, after attempting to flee the scene.

Cook's Corner re-opened on September 1, a little more than a week after the incident.

== Gallery ==
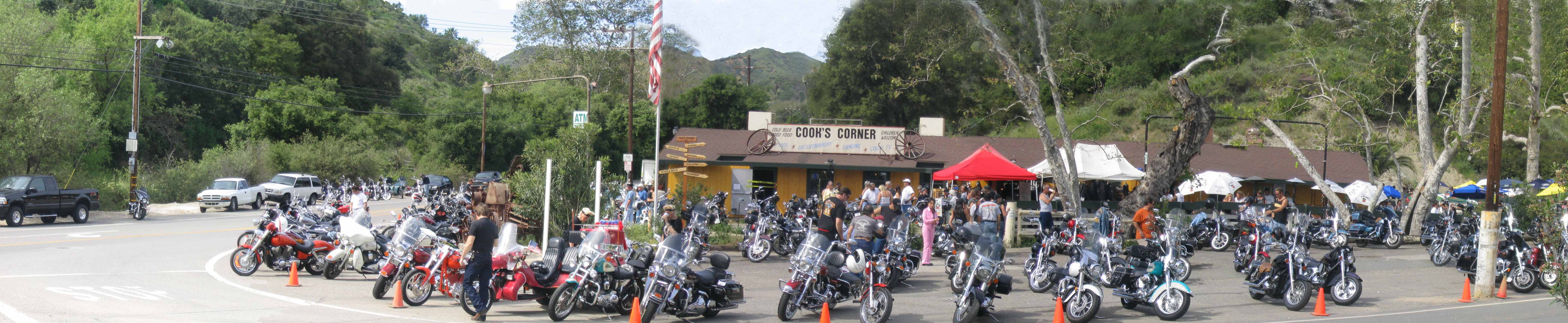
Motorcycles at Cook's Corner

== See also ==
- Biker bar
- List of public house topics
