= Trabuco Oaks Steakhouse =

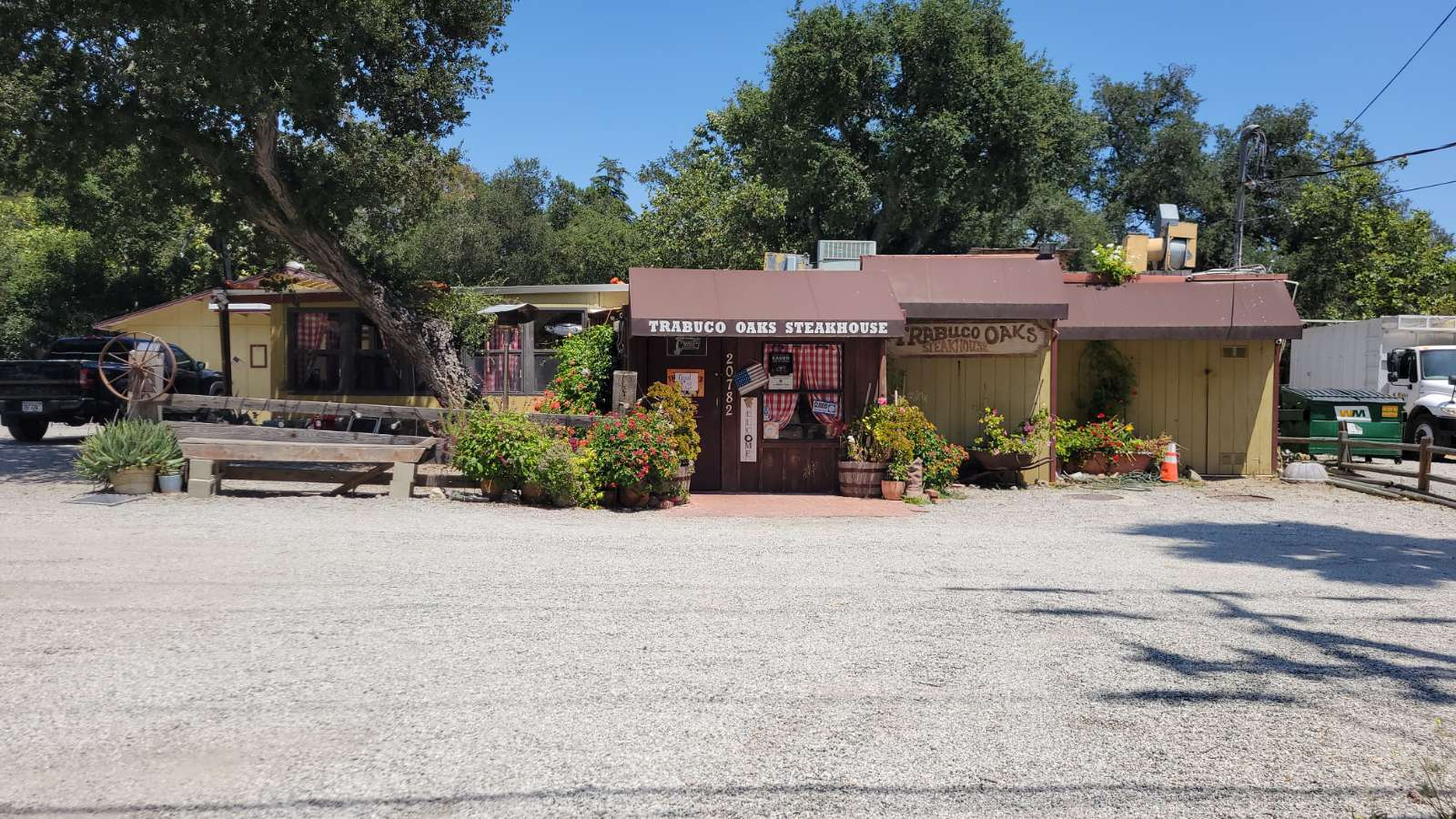
- Interactive map of Trabuco Oaks Steakhouse

Restaurant information
- Established: June 28, 1968
- Food type: Steakhouse
- Dress code: Semi-casual
- Location: 20782 Trabuco Oaks Dr, Trabuco Canyon, Orange County, California, California, United States
- Coordinates: 33°39′38″N 117°35′24″W
- Reservations: Required for dining; walk-in for bar

Trabuco Oaks Steakhouse is a steakhouse located in the unincorporated community of Trabuco Canyon, California. The semi-casual restaurant serves steak and potatoes and liquor at its bar. Trabuco Oaks Steakhouse is famous for its no-tie policy; if a patron is wearing a tie at the restaurant, it is cut off and hung from the ceiling alongside many other ties.

== History ==
Trabuco Oaks Steakhouse was founded by Eleanor, Duke, and Randy Sherod in 1968. It opened on June 28 of that year as a snack bar for campers staying at the nearby O'Neill Regional Park. Eventually, the decision was made to convert the snack bar into a dinner restaurant. In 1982, the Southern California Restaurant Writers dubbed the steakhouse "A Legend In Its Own Time," a phrase that was adopted as the slogan of the restaurant.

Former U.S. president and Orange County native Richard Nixon would frequent the restaurant. Inside the restaurant is a photo of co-founder Eleanor Sherod cutting off Nixon's tie.

== Restaurant ==
Trabuco Oaks Steakhouse's primarily charcoal grills its T-bone, sirloin, and filet steaks, with dishes such as the two- pound Cowboy Steak to the eight-ounce filet mignon. Other selections include chicken, fish and vegetarian entrees, salads, baked beans, french fries as well as a selection of California wines. The restaurant is situated in a wooden shack-like building that was constructed around a large tree — its trunk is situated in the dining area. There is no gas in the restaurant.
