= Franciscan Sisters of the Immaculate =

Catholic female convent

- Suore Francescane dell’Immacolata
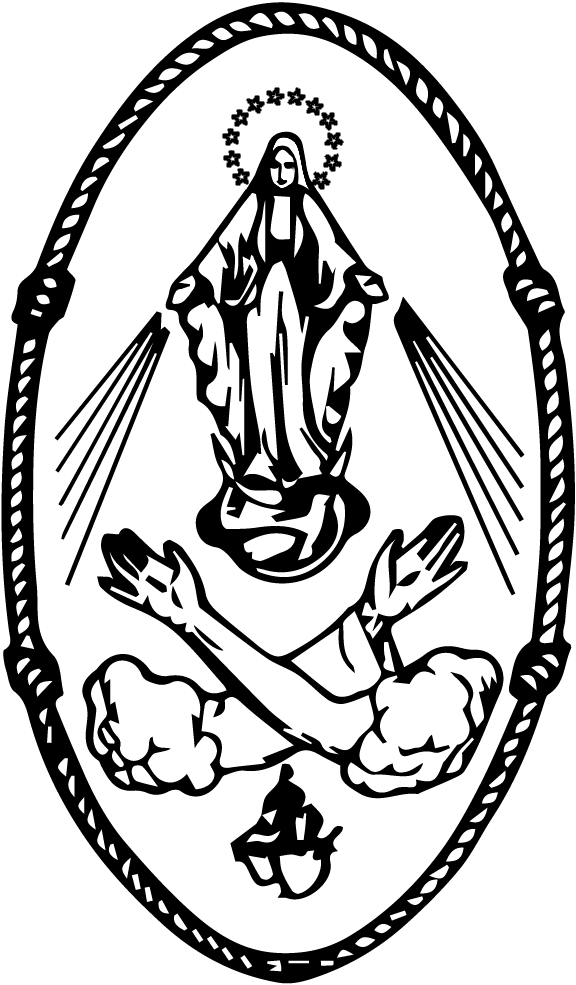
- Ave Maria!
- Abbreviation: FI
- Formation: November 1, 1982; 44 years ago
- Founder: Fr. Stefano Maria Pio Manelli, Fr. Gabriele Maria Pelletieri
- Type: Clerical Religious Congregation of Pontifical Right (for Women)
- Website: https://marymediatrix.com/

Franciscan Sisters of the Immaculate, FI (Latin: Congregatio Sororum Franciscanorum Immaculatae) is a Catholic female religious congregation under pontifical rights founded in 1982 in Italy by Fr. Stefano M. Manelli and Fr. Gabriele M. Pellettieri. It is the female branch of the Franciscans of the Immaculate.

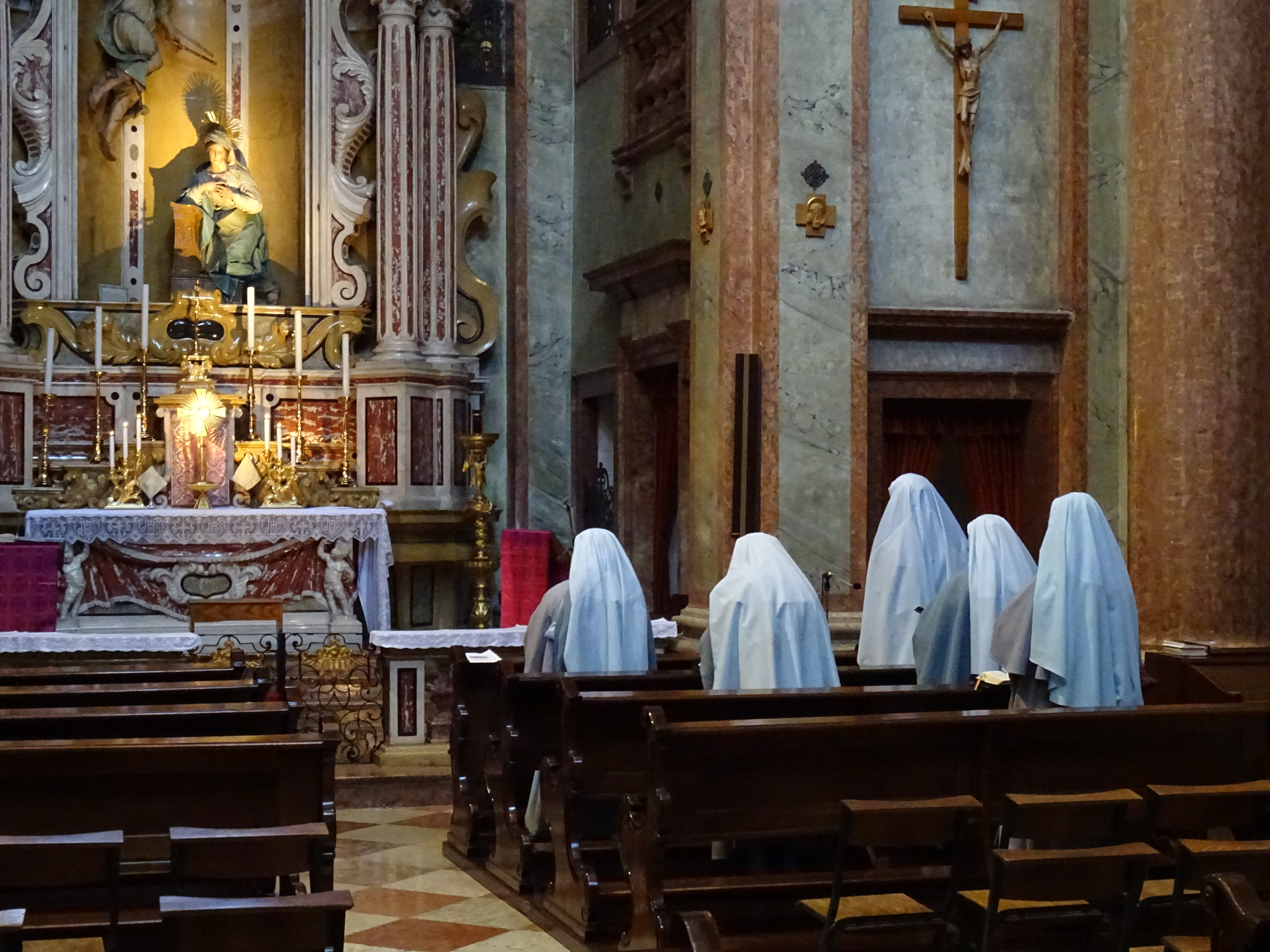
Franciscan Sisters of the Immaculate in prayer

== History of the Congregation ==
The origins of the congregation date back to 1969, when Father Stefano M. Manelli OFMConv. sent a letter on Christmas Eve to the General of the Franciscan Friars Minor Conventual, Father Basilio Heiser, asking his permission to start a new form of Franciscan life, close to the sources, i.e. to the religious rule formulated by St. Francis . The General of the Order commissioned Fr Manelli to write a programme for such a community. This led to the creation of the "Route of Franciscan Life Renewed Today", since 1982 bearing the name "Marian Route of Franciscan Life".

O. Basilio Heiser approved the project on 21 April 1970. He also encouraged Fr Stefano to find a companion with whom he could start a new experience. The choice fell on Fr Gabriele M. Pellettieri. On 2 August of the same year, the two fathers arrived in Frigento, where they tried to reproduce as perfectly as possible the model set by the first Franciscan communities formed at Porciuncula. The convent at Frigento was called the "House of Mary". All later conventuals of the Franciscans of the Immaculate were also so named.

The House of Mary was acquiring a character of its own, both in the way it conducted its community life and its apostolic works, and its distinctiveness became more and more pronounced over the years. Therefore, the Extraordinary Provincial Chapter, convened in Naples in 1989, recognised the Community of Frigento as the place where a new charism matured, one that did not fit within the framework of the Constitutions of the Order of Friars Minor Conventual. The matter was submitted to Pope John Paul II, who in 1990 granted Archbishop Beneventu Carlo Minchiatti the authority to erect a new Religious Institute under diocesan rights. The institute was named Franciscans of the Immaculate. Eight years later, on 1 January 1998, it received papal approval.

=== Female branch ===
Parallelly to the male order, its female branch developed. It originated in the Philippines, where in 1982 a group of girls led by Fr. Gabriel founded a community recognised by Cardinal J. Sin, then Archbishop of Manila. In 1988, the community moved to Italy and on 2 August 1993 gained the rank of an Institute with diocesan rights, which received papal approval on 23 June 1998.

== Charism of the Congregation ==
The charism of the Franciscan Friars of the Immaculate is based on the Approved Rule of St. Francis of Assisi (1181-1226) and on the "Marian Way of Franciscan Life", which expresses its Marian dimension. These documents are contained in the so-called "Book of Sanctification" and, together with the Constitutions and Directory, form a complete set of rules governing the religious life of the congregation. The main premise of the charism is to return to the sources of Franciscanism and to live it in the manner of the first communities of the Franciscan Order, especially those present at the Portiuncula. Another important source of inspiration is the spirituality of St. Maximilian Maria Kolbe (1894-1941) and the monasteries he founded in Niepokalanow and Nagasaki, oriented towards apostolic activity to spread devotion to St. Mary. The habits are blue-gray, and they wear the Miraculous Medal. Like other religious communities they profess the evangelical counsels of poverty, chastity and obedience, but they also take a fourth “Marian” vow whereby they consecrate themselves to the Mother of God.

=== Marian Vow ===
The most specific expression of this charism is the vow of unreserved devotion to the Immaculate, called the Marian Vow, taken at religious profession as the first of the four Vows (of which the others correspond to the Evangelical counsels). As the religious constitutions indicate: 'The Marian Vow is a solemn pledge of unreserved dedication to the Immaculate for her total ownership, made to God during religious profession, in order to hasten the coming of Christ's Kingdom to the world; it carries with it the obligation to carry out the same universal mission of the Immaculate Mediatrix..

== Apostolic Activities ==
The apostolic activities of the Congregation are mainly focused on Media, including book publications and radio. The Franciscan Sisters of the Immaculate also have missionary outposts in Africa, Asia and South America, where they carry out extensive evangelisation and care for the poor and needy.

== Formation ==
The formation of the Franciscan Sisters of the Immaculate includes the following stages: aspiranture (about 1 year); postulancy (about 1 year); novitiate (1 year); profession temporary renewal every year (3–5 years); perpetual profession.

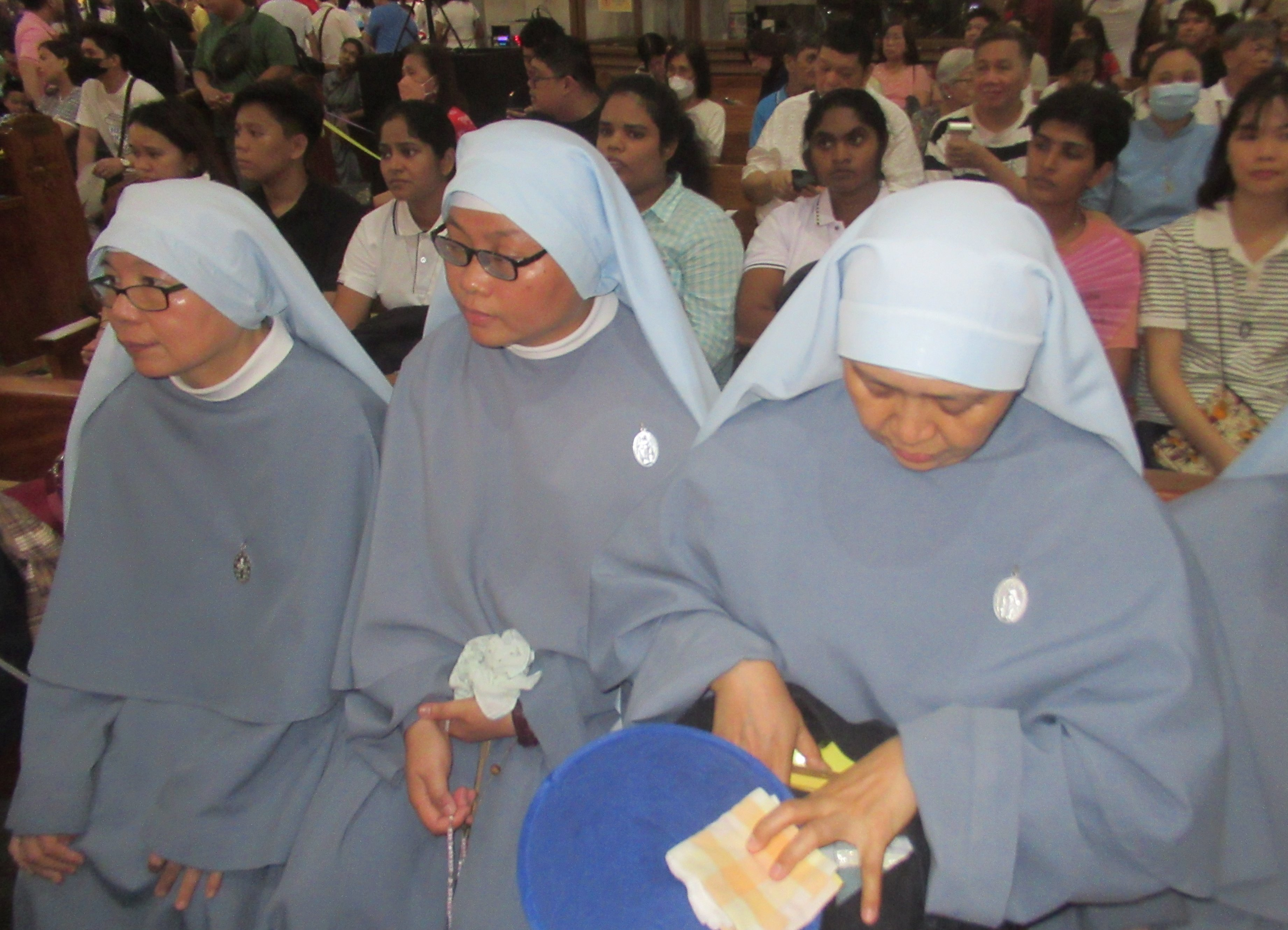
Franciscan Sisters of the Immaculate, Philippines

== Franciscan Sisters of the Immaculate in English-speaking countries ==
Franciscan Sisters of the Immaculate have currently their communities in English-speaking countries as the Philippines, USA and Great Britain.
