= John Caronan =

Filipino-American Roman Catholic priest (born 1964)

The Right Reverend Abbot John Caronan O.Praem.
- 3rd Abbot of St. Michael's Abbey
- Church: Roman Catholic Church
- Diocese: Diocese of Orange
- Elected: 19 June 2026
- Installed: 28 September 2026
- Predecessor: Eugene Joseph Hayes

Orders
- Ordination: 1994

Personal details
- Born: Edgar Caronan; 1964 (age 61–62) Manila, Philippines
- Motto: Patris Corde (With a Father’s Heart)
- Coat of arms

Styles of John Caronan
- Reference style: The Right Reverend
- Religious style: Abbot
- Informal style: Father Abbot

John Edgar Caronan, O.Praem. (born 1964) is a Filipino-American Roman Catholic priest and Premonstratensian canon regular who, since 19 June 2026, has served as the 3rd Abbot of St. Michael's Abbey in Silverado, California.

== Biography ==
Born Edgar Caronan in Manila, Philippines in 1964. Caronan immigrated to the United States with his family in 1975. In 1985, he entered the St. Michael's Abbey, made his solemn profession in 1992 and was ordained a priest in 1994.

Caronan is a Canon Lawyer and spent much of his ministry in the marriage tribunals of the Diocese of Orange. He served as the judicial vicar of both the Diocese of Orange and the Tribunal of the Maronite Eparchy of Our Lady of Lebanon. He has also been the regular celebrant of the Tridentine Mass at St. John the Baptist Parish Church in Costa Mesa, which is administrated by the Norbertine Canons.

On 19 June 2026, after the resignation of the 2nd Abbot of St. Michael's Abbey, Eugene Joseph Hayes, due to the mandatory retirement age of 75 by the Code of Canon Law, Caronan was elected 3rd abbot for a twelve-year term followed via secret ballot, he become the first Filipino-born Abbot in the history of the abbey community.

Caronan received his Abbatial Blessing on 28 September 2026 by Cardinal Raymond Leo Burke, and he celebrate his first Pontifical Mass the following day, 29 September 2026, the Feast Day of St. Michael the Archangel and the Patron of the abbey community.
