= Hurley Mountain Inn =

- Interactive map of Hurley Mountain Inn

Restaurant information
- Location: 106 Old Route 209, Hurley, New York, 12443, United States
- Coordinates: 41°55′35″N 74°4′5″W
- Website: HurleyMountainInn.com

Hurley Mountain Inn is a restaurant/sports tavern located in historic Hurley, New York.

== History ==
The Hurley Mountain Inn is one of the oldest continuously operated establishments in Ulster County. It began in 1830 as the "Wynkoop House" named after its founder Peter Wynkoop. In 1888 it quickly became known as the "Suspension Bridge House" because of its proximity to the new suspension bridge that was constructed at or about that time over the Esopus Creek. The United States Post Office was located at the Inn from 1837 until 1853. It was also a stop on the Ellenville-Kingston stagecoach until the early 1900's when that line ceased to operate. During the summers of 1872 and 1873 noted painter Winslow Homer stayed at the Inn while he painted scenes in the Esopus Valley. Around the turn of the century it was renamed the Hurley Hotel, eventually nicknamed the "Hurley Hilton" by its patrons. A one chair barber shop was added in the 1960s. The original barber pole is still on display there. In 1973 it was renamed the Hurley Mountain Inn. The Hurley Mountain Inn thrived with the New York State Police barracks sited directly across the street. In the early 1980s the Hurley Mountain Inn was featured in the movie "Tootsie" starring Dustin Hoffman, Bill Murray, Jessica Lang and Charles Durning. In summer of 2001 the Hurley Mountain Inn was completely renovated for the first time in over 30 years. It is still in operation today. They claim to have the largest St. Patrick's Day celebration in New York - "latest figure, we served over 12,000 pounds of corned beef in just 6 days! (Not to mention 5000 pounds of cabbage, 4500 pounds of potatoes and 4,000 pounds of carrots!)."
