= Franciscan Friars of the Immaculate =

Roman Catholic religious congregation for men

- Frati Francescani dell’Immacolata
- Ave Maria!
- Abbreviation: FFI / FI
- Formation: August 2, 1970; 55 years ago
- Founder: Fr. Stefano Maria Pio Manelli, F.F.I.
- Type: Clerical Religious Congregation of Pontifical Right (for Men)
- Headquarters: Via Palazzolo 2, 00040 Rocca di Papa, RM, Italy
- Coordinates: 41.0047°N 15.1079°E
- Members: 291 members (includes 129 priests) as of 2019
- General Minister: Fr. Immacolato M.Acquali, FFI
- Website: www.immacolata.com

The Franciscan Friars of the Immaculate (Latin: Congregatio Fratrum Franciscanorum Immaculatae; abbreviated FFI or FI) is a religious institute founded in 1970 by Conventual Franciscans Stefano Maria Pio Manelli and Gabriel Maria Pellettieri and canonically erected by Pope John Paul II in 1998. Their rule of life is the Regula Bullata of Saint Francis of Assisi according to the Traccia Mariana.

The FFI is the male branch of the Franciscans of the Immaculate, while the female branch is the Franciscan Sisters of the Immaculate. There is a third branch for lay people, namely the Franciscan Tertiaries of the Immaculate.

== History ==
=== Foundation ===
On 2 August 1970, Stefano Maria Manelli and Gabriel Maria Pellettieri, two Conventual Franciscans, started the FFI in Casa Mariana, Mary Most Holy of Good Counsel at Frigento in the province of Avellino, Italy. Pellettieri was also one of the first four original Conventual friars sent by the Minister General of the Conventuals to start the mission in the Philippines.

On 23 June 1990, the Archbishop of Benevento, Carlo Minchiatti, with the express permission of Pope John Paul II, erected as the Franciscan Friars of the Immaculate the approximately thirty Franciscan friars who lived at Casa Mariana as a religious institute of diocesan right. On 1 August 1993, the ordinary of Monte Cassino erected the Franciscan Sisters of the Immaculate, a religious institute of women, also living the Regula Bullata according to the Traccia.

Pope John Paul II elevated the FFI to an institute of pontifical right on 1 January 1998, and the Franciscan Sisters of the Immaculate was likewise elevated on 9 November 1998.

Following the publication of the apostolic letter Summorum Pontificum by Pope Benedict XVI in 2007, Father Manelli promoted the celebration of the Tridentine Mass in the churches run by the order. This caused a protest from a minority of the order, who objected that this was not in line with the founding Constitutions of the order. Such minority appealed in protest to the Congregation for Institutes of Consecrated Life and Societies of Apostolic Life in 2010.

=== Apostolic commission ===
In July 2012, Pope Benedict XVI authorized an apostolic visitation, recommended by João Braz de Aviz prefect of the Congregation for Institutes of Consecrated Life and Societies of Apostolic Life. This was stated to be due to five priests complaining that the institute had an "overly traditionalist bent". One of the priests, Alfonso Maria Bruno, welcomed the apostolic visitation, accusing the sisters of becoming accustomed to using the Extraordinary Form exclusively and that their decision had then been “exploited” by traditionalist groups.

In July 2013, under Pope Francis, the Congregation for Religious issued a decree dissolving the General Council of the FFI and appointed Father Fidenzio Volpi O.F.M. Cap. as an apostolic commissioner with governing authority over the FFI. Volpi subsequently sent Manelli away to a home, closed the FFI's seminary, suppressed the lay movement, and suspended the ordination of all prospective priests. He also accused Manelli of a cult of personality, and other friars of embezzlement. The Congregation also stripped the FFI from their permission of celebrating the Tridentine Mass; Cardinal Darío Castrillón Hoyos, chairman of the Pontifical Commission Ecclesia Dei, stated that such measure was only temporary and due to the abuse of the Extraordinary Form in that particular context. However, Summorum Pontificum was later repealed by Pope Francis through the apostolic letter Traditionis custodes in 2021, making such ban permanent.

Bruno and as well as another priest Angelo M. Geiger initially said in July 2013 that the vast majority of members welcomed the intervention by the Holy See in the present complicated situation. However, in September 2013, the FFI and the Congregation published the results of a poll of the friars that had been conducted before assigning a commissioner, showing that only a minority wanted a commissioner. In January 2014, a further note published by the Congregation said that, out of 350 friars, only 21 had asked for a commissioner.

In June 2015, Volpi suffered a stroke and died. He was replaced by a commission composed by Father Sabino Ardito SDB, Father Gianfranco Ghirlanda SJ and Father Carlo Calloni OFMCap.

=== End of commission ===
The Apostolic commission came to an end in 2022: on 13 May of that year, Father Immacolato M. Aquali FFI was elected new Minister General of the order and Father Massimiliano M. Zangheratti FFI was elected new Vicar General.

== Charism ==
The FFI follow the footsteps of Francis of Assisi (1181–1226) after the example of Maximilian Kolbe (1894–1941), who is considered a martyr of charity in the Auschwitz concentration camp. Their habits are gray-blue, and they wear the Miraculous Medal. Like other religious communities they profess the evangelical counsels of poverty, chastity and obedience, but they also take a fourth “Marian” vow whereby they consecrate themselves to the Mother of God.

=== The Traccia Mariana ===
The Traccia Mariana is the way of life that the F.F.I. lives, a Marian plan for Franciscan life. The Traccia Mariana was submitted by Fr. Manelli and approved by the Minister General of the Franciscan Conventuals in the summer of 1970. It was first lived in the Casa Mariana in Frigento, Avellino, Italy. The entire Traccia Mariana formation program has been established in the Franciscan Conventual Province of Naples and the mission in the Philippines, which was then under the custody of the province of Naples.

== Apostolates ==
Today, the Franciscan Friars of the Immaculate are composed of about 200 professed members each. The F.F.I. is present today on most continents of the world with friaries in Argentina, Austria, Benin, Brazil, Cameroon, France, Italy, Portugal, Nigeria, the Philippines, and the United States.

In the United States, the friars run a retreat center, Mount Saint Francis Hermitage in Maine, New York and another, Mother of the Redeemer Retreat Center, in Bloomington, Indiana.

The Academy of the Immaculate also publishes Missio Immaculatae, a bimonthly magazine that is dedicated to Mariology.

In 2006, the Franciscan Friars of the Immaculate in the United States developed AirMaria.com, a website which produces and hosts Catholic videos and other media.

Since 1992 is also available the website www.AcademyOfTheImmaculate.com.. The Academy of the Immaculate is a non-profit religious-charitable organization of the Roman Catholic Church, whose offices are located in New Bedford, MA. It publishes hard-copy books and e-books on the Mystery of the Immaculate Conception and the universal maternal mediation of the Virgin Mother of God, but also Marian, Eucharistic and Franciscan titles.
