= Trabuco Canyon, California =

Census-designated place in California, United States

- Unincorporated community Census-designated place
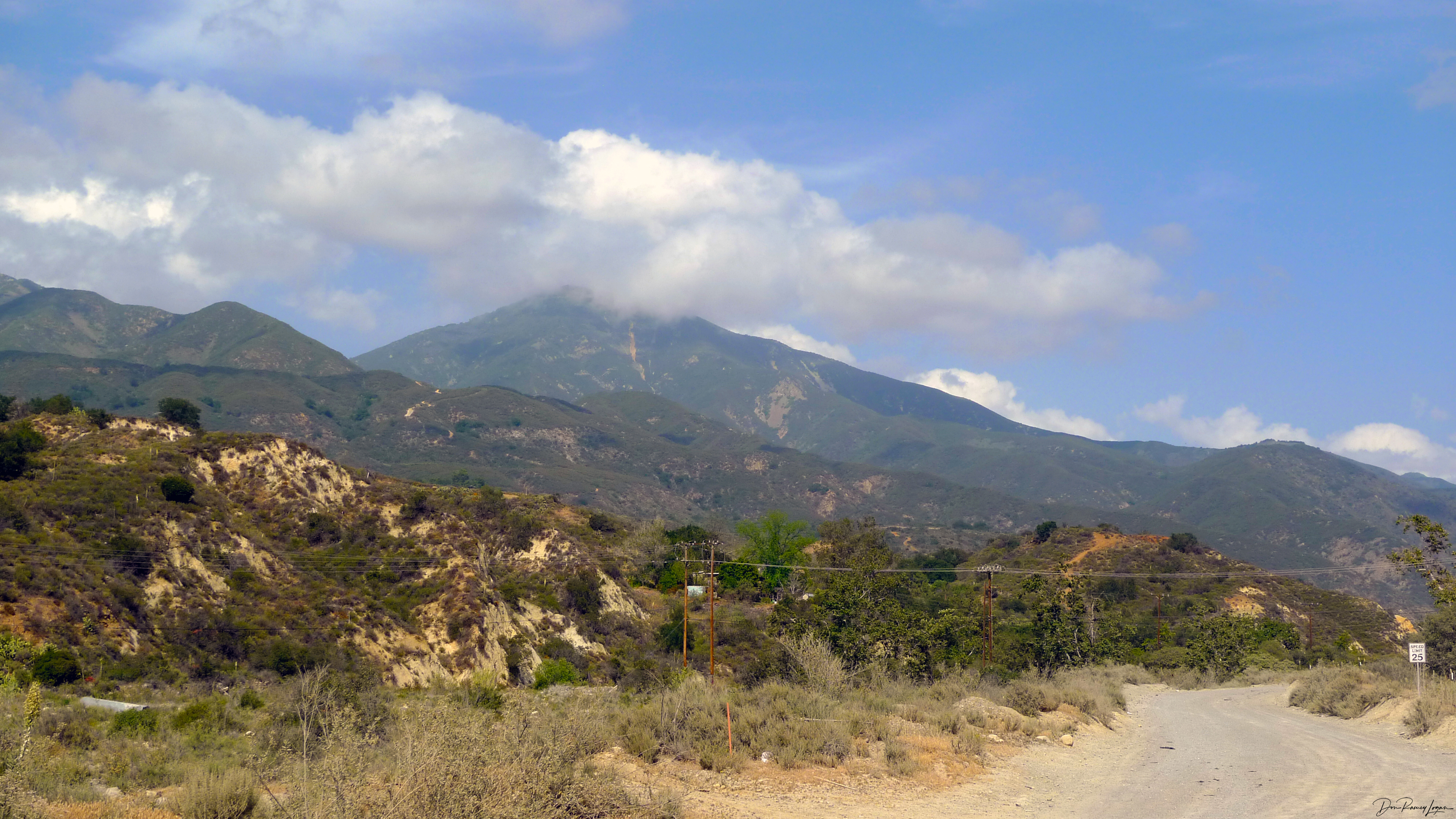
- The "Wash" at Trabuco Canyon
- Interactive map of Trabuco Canyon, California
- Coordinates: 33°40′42″N 117°35′38″W
- Country: United States
- State: California
- County: Orange

Area
  - Total: 7.283 sq mi (18.86 km^{2})
  - Land: 7.283 sq mi (18.86 km^{2})
  - Water: 0 sq mi (0 km^{2})
- Elevation: 434 ft (132 m)

Population (2020)
  - Total: 1,020
  - Density: 140/sq mi (54.1/km^{2})
- Time zone: UTC-8 (PST)
  - Summer (DST): UTC-7 (PDT)
- ZIP code: 92678-92679
- Area code: 949
- GNIS feature ID: 2812660

Trabuco Canyon (Trabuco, Spanish for "Blunderbuss") is a small unincorporated community and census-designated place (CDP) located in the foothills of the Santa Ana Mountains in eastern Orange County, California, United States, and lies partly within the Cleveland National Forest.

As of the 2020 census, Trabuco Canyon had a population of 1,020.

Trabuco Canyon is north of the city of Rancho Santa Margarita. Plano Trabuco Road leads from the top of the canyon south to Rancho Santa Margarita.

== History ==
Trabuco is Spanish for blunderbuss, a type of shotgun. Some credit a Franciscan friar traveling with the Gaspar de Portolá Expedition in 1769 with the story that a blunderbuss was lost in the canyon, after which the area was named. A mission was originally to be built in the canyon, but was instead established in San Juan Capistrano.

The Trabuco Adobe was built in 1810 next to the Acjachemen village of Alume that was also identified during the 1769 Portolá expedition, where Juan Crespí wrote, "we made camp close to a village of the most tractable and friendly heathens we have seen upon the whole way."

John (Don Juan) Forster received a Mexican land grant in 1846 and established Rancho Trabuco. The grant was bordered by Rancho Cañada de los Alisos on the west, and by Rancho Mission Viejo on the east.

Trabuco Canyon was the site of attempts to mine tin in the early 1900s. Mining remains from this activity include: tunnels into the sides of the canyon (closed for public safety); the stone foundation of an ore-processing stamp mill; and several dams on the creek.

The Trabuco Canyon National Forest was established in 1907, which was quickly combined into the Cleveland National Forest in 1908.

One of the last California grizzly bears was killed in Trabuco Canyon in 1908, a female bear thought to be the mate of the so-called "Monster of San Mateo."

On October 21, 2007, a large wildfire started in Silverado Canyon and spread to Trabuco Canyon. The Canyon was evacuated by the Fire Department.

On August 6, 2018, the Holy Fire started near Santiago Peak. It led to the canyon being evacuated, with 24 structures being burned down, mainly in Holy Jim. The fire spread to around 23,000 acres at its peak.

On August 23, 2023, it was the site of a mass shooting that resulted in four dead, including the perpetrator, and six injured.

On September 9, 2024, a spark from heavy equipment working near Trabuco Creek Road caused a wildfire within Trabuco Canyon, dubbed the Airport Fire. The fire spread to Santiago Peak. The Canyon and nearby residencies were evacuated by the local Fire Department.

== Features ==
Fourth of July features an old-fashioned parade of locals riding horses and pulling home-made floats. A local landmark is the Trabuco Oaks Steakhouse, which was a favorite restaurant of former President Richard Nixon.

The Vedanta Society of Southern California has the Ramakrishna Mission monastery on 40 acres (160,000 m^{2}) in the canyon, founded in 1942 by author and philosopher Gerald Heard. The Trabuco Canyon Community Church is located in the canyon also.

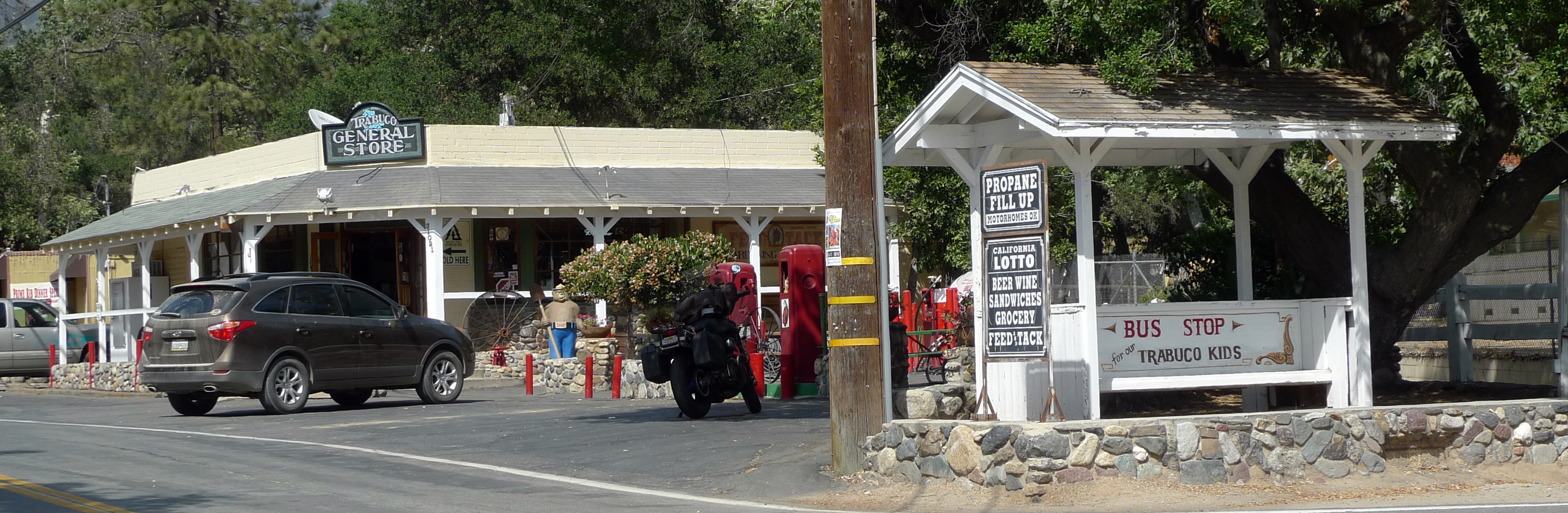
Trabuco Canyon general store

== Demographics ==
Historical population
Census	Pop.	Note	%±
2020	1,020		—
U.S. Decennial Census; 2020

For statistical purposes, the United States Census Bureau first listed Trabuco Canyon as a census-designated place (CDP) in the 2020 census.

=== 2020 census ===
As of the 2020 census, Trabuco Canyon had a population of 1,020. The median age was 45.4 years. 17.4% of residents were under the age of 18 and 17.5% of residents were 65 years of age or older. For every 100 females there were 96.2 males, and for every 100 females age 18 and over there were 100.7 males age 18 and over.

0.1% of residents lived in urban areas, while 99.9% lived in rural areas.

There were 365 households in Trabuco Canyon, of which 30.7% had children under the age of 18 living in them. Of all households, 57.3% were married-couple households, 15.9% were households with a male householder and no spouse or partner present, and 18.1% were households with a female householder and no spouse or partner present. About 19.7% of all households were made up of individuals and 7.1% had someone living alone who was 65 years of age or older.

There were 372 housing units, of which 1.9% were vacant. The homeowner vacancy rate was 0.3% and the rental vacancy rate was 0.0%.

Trabuco Canyon CDP, California - Demographic Profile Note: the US Census treats Hispanic/Latino as an ethnic category. This table excludes Latinos from the racial categories and assigns them to a separate category. Hispanics/Latinos may be of any race.
Race / Ethnicity (NH = Non-Hispanic)	Pop 2020	% 2020
White alone (NH)	718	70.39%
Black or African American alone (NH)	12	1.18%
Native American or Alaska Native alone (NH)	2	0.20%
Asian alone (NH)	62	6.08%
Pacific Islander alone (NH)	0	0.00%
Other race alone (NH)	7	0.69%
Mixed race or Multiracial (NH)	61	5.98%
Hispanic or Latino (any race)	158	15.49%
Total	1,020	100.00%

== Notable people ==
- Matt Chapman, MLB third baseman, presently playing for San Francisco Giants

== See also ==
- Trabuco Creek
