= List of radio stations in Coahuila =

This is a list of CRT-Licensed radio stations in the Mexican state of Coahuila, which can be sorted by their call signs, frequencies, location, ownership, names, and programming formats.

Radio stations in Coahuila
Call sign	Frequency	Location	Owner	Name	Format
XEGIK-AM (Note: Linked to XHGIK-FM, which must keep XEGIK-AM on the air until there are no listeners in its service area unserved by other radio stations.)	560 AM	Ciudad Frontera	Radio Estelar 920, S.A. de C.V.	La Acerera	Regional Mexican
XELRDA-AM	580 AM	Piedras Negras	La Rancherita del Aire, S.A. de C.V.	La Rancherita del Aire	
XESORN-AM	610 AM	Saltillo	Organización Radiofónica del Norte, S.A. de C.V.	Viva Saltillo	
XEDE-AM (Note: Linked to XHDE-FM, which must keep XEDE-AM on the air until there are no listeners in its service area unserved by other radio stations.)	720 AM	Arteaga	GIM Televisión Nacional, S.A. de C.V.	La Lupe	Adult hits
XEQN-AM (Note: Linked to XHQN-FM, which must keep XEQN-AM on the air until there are no listeners in its service area unserved by other radio stations.)	740 AM	Torreón	Transmisora Regional Radio Fórmula, S.A. de C.V.	Radio Fórmula	News/talk
XEWGR-AM (Note: Combo with XHWGR-FM 101.1)	780 AM	Monclova	Radio XEMF, S.A. de C.V.	Exa FM	Pop
XESAME-AM	930 AM	Saltillo	Media FM, S.A. de C.V.	—N/a	—N/a
XESAL-AM	1220 AM	Saltillo	Universidad Autónoma Agraria Antonio Narro	Radio Narro	University radio
XETGME-AM	1270 AM	Torreón	Media FM, S.A. de C.V.	—N/a	—N/a
XEPNME-AM	1320 AM	Piedras Negras	Media FM, S.A. de C.V.	—N/a	—N/a
XERF-AM (Note: Linked to XHRF-FM, which must keep XERF-AM on the air until there are no listeners in its service area unserved by other radio stations.)	1570 AM	Ciudad Acuña	Instituto Mexicano de la Radio	La Poderosa	Public radio
XHGIK-FM	88.1 FM	Ciudad Frontera	Radio Estelar 920, S.A. de C.V.	La Acerera	Regional Mexican
XHCCAP-FM	88.3 FM	Parras de la Fuente	Social Media Coahuila, S.A. de C.V.	Región 88.3	
XHCCAM-FM	88.9 FM	Cuatro Ciénegas de Carranza	Nova Teleradio, S.A. de C.V.	Región 88.9	
XHAJ-FM	88.9 FM	Saltillo	Compañía Periodística Criterios, S.A. de C.V.	La Primera	Regional Mexican
XHENR-FM	89.1 FM	Nueva Rosita	La Primera de Rosita, S.A. de C.V.	XENR	
XHETB-FM	89.1 FM	Torreón	Grupo Horizonte Lagunero, S.A. de C.V.	XENR	
XHCSDH-FM	89.3 FM	Monclova	RYTSM, A.C.	—N/a	—N/a
XHSOC-FM	89.7 FM	Saltillo	Gobierno del Estado de Coahuila	Radio Coahuila	Public radio
XHJQ-FM	89.9 FM	Parras de la Fuente	Radio Difusión Comercial, S.A.	La Explosiva	
XHPCIE-FM	90.5 FM	Cuatro Cienegas	José David Juaristi Santos	La Primera	
XHMZI-FM	91.1 FM	Melchor Muzquiz	Radiodifusoras Capital, S.A. de C.V.	Región 91.1	
XHTC-FM	91.1 FM	Torreón	Radio Mayran, S.A. de C.V.	Kiuu	
XHEIM-FM	91.3 FM	Saltillo	Radiodifusoras Capital, S.A. de C.V.	Región 91.3	
XHDH-FM	91.5 FM	Ciudad Acuña	Nova Teleradio, S.A. de C.V.	Región 91.5 Exa FM	Pop
XHCCAN-FM	91.5 FM	Monclova	José David Juaristi Santos	La Santa	Regional Mexican
XHDRO-FM	91.5 FM	San Pedro	Gobierno del Estado de Coahuila	Radio Coahuila	Public radio
XHPEAD-FM	91.7 FM	Piedras Negras	Fundación de la Radio Cultural, A.C.	Espacio	Cultural
XHEC-FM	91.9 FM	Sabinas	Organización Radiofónica del Norte, S.A. de C.V.	La Más Buena	Regional Mexican
XHCCAS-FM	91.9 FM	Torreón	Tele Saltillo, S.A. de C.V.	—N/a	—N/a
XHPEFQ-FM	92.1 FM	Saltillo	Alas para las Palabras, A.C.	ADN 92.1	Variety
XHTRR-FM	92.3 FM	Torreón	Multimedios Radio, S.A. de C.V.	La Caliente	Regional Mexican
XHPEDM-FM	92.5 FM	Cuatro Ciénegas de Carranza	Fundación de la Radio Cultural, A.C.	Espacio	
XHCPFI-FM	92.7 FM	Torreón	Universidad Autónoma de Coahuila	Radio Universidad	University radio
XHCDU-FM	92.9 FM	Ciudad Acuña	Radio Millenium, S.A. de C.V.	Súper Estelar	Regional Mexican
XHCSBA-FM	93.1 FM	Monclova	Lilia Guadalupe Martínez González	Coahuila Hoy Radio	Regional Mexican/News
XHNRC-FM	93.1 FM	Nueva Rosita	Gobierno del Estado de Coahuila	Radio Coahuila	Public radio
XHCTO-FM	93.1 FM	Torreón	Multimedios Radio, S.A. de C.V.	Hits FM	Pop
XHQC-FM	93.5 FM	Saltillo	Radio Triunfos, S.A. de C.V.	Stereo Saltillo	Pop
XHVD-FM	93.9 FM	Ciudad Allende	Josué Rodrigo, José Luis y Rosario del Carmen Moreno Aguirre	Radio Sensación	
XHONT-FM	93.9 FM	Frontera	Gobierno del Estado de Coahuila	Radio Coahuila	Public radio
XHWN-FM	93.9 FM	Torreón	Radio Triunfos, S.A. de C.V.	Radio Recuerdo	Spanish oldies
XHBTC-FM	94.3 FM	Minas de Barroterán	Gobierno del Estado de Coahuila	Radio Coahuila	Public radio
XHTA-FM	94.5 FM	Piedras Negras	XHTA, S.A. de C.V.	Dinami-K	
XHXU-FM	94.7 FM	Frontera	Francisco Everardo Elizondo Cedillo	La Poderosa	
XHRP-FM	94.7 FM	Saltillo	GIM Televisión Nacional, S.A. de C.V.	Imagen Radio	News/talk
XHCSDI-FM	95.1 FM	Torreón	RYTSM, A.C.	—N/a	—N/a
XHRG-FM	95.5 FM	Ciudad Acuña	Roberto Casimiro Gonzalez Treviño	La Ley	Regional Mexican
XHMP-FM	95.5 FM	Torreón	Fermur Radio, S.A. de C.V.	Exa FM	Pop
XHCCAR-FM	95.9 FM	Torreón	Radio Cañón, S.A. de C.V.	—N/a	—N/a
XHVUC-FM	95.9 FM	Villa Unión	Organización Radiofónica del Norte, S.A. de C.V.	Globo	Spanish adult contemporary
XHEMF-FM	96.3 FM	Monclova	Radiodifusora de Monclova, S.A.	La Mejor	Regional Mexican
XHTOR-FM	96.3 FM	Torreón	XHTOR Radio Torreón	Radio Torreón	Public radio
XHIK-FM	96.7 FM	Piedras Negras	XEIK, S.A. de C.V.	La Santa	Regional Mexican
XHPEEI-FM	97.1 FM	Ciudad Acuña	Fundación de la Radio Cultural, A.C.	Espacio	Cultural
XHPU-FM	97.1 FM	Monclova	Patronato Cultural Monclova, A.C.	La PU	Cultural
XHPE-FM	97.1 FM	Torreón	D.L.R. Radio, S.A. de C.V.	La Mejor, Estéreo Gallito	Regional Mexican
XHZR-FM	97.3 FM	Zaragoza	Radiotelevisión Norteña, S.A. de C.V.	La Traviesa	Regional Mexican
XHCSBB-FM	97.5 FM	Torreón	Lilia Guadalupe Martínez González	Coahuila Hoy Radio	Regional Mexican/News
XHESCC-FM	97.7 FM	Sabinas	Radio Divertida XESC, S.A. de C.V.	La 97.7 FM	
XHAAL-FM	97.7 FM	Saltillo	Armando Sergio Fuentes Aguirre	Radio Concierto	Cultural
XHMJ-FM	97.9 FM	Piedras Negras	Radiodifusoras Capital, S.A. de C.V.	Región	
XHEON-FM	97.9 FM	Torreón	Gobierno del Estado de Coahuila	Radio Coahuila	Public radio
XHBF-FM	98.3 FM	San Pedro de las Colonias	Radiodifusora XEBF-AM, S.A. de C.V.	El Viejón	Regional Mexican
XHFRC-FM	98.7 FM	Monclova	Sucesión de Melchor Sánchez Dovalina	Espacio	Cultural
XHUAL-FM	98.7 FM	Torreón	Universidad Autónoma de la Laguna, A.C.	Frecuencia UAL	University radio
XHOZA-FM	98.7 FM	Zaragoza	Gobierno del Estado de Coahuila	Radio Coahuila	Public radio
XHSL-FM	99.1 FM	Piedras Negras	Master Radiodifusión, S.A. de C.V.	La Mejor	Regional Mexican
XHSICB-FM	99.3 FM	Ciudad Melchor Múzquiz	Comunidad Indígena Kikapú (Kikaapoa) de Coahuila de Zaragoza	Radio Kickapoo	Indigenous
XHSAC-FM	99.3 FM	Saltillo	XESAC-AM, S.A. de C.V.	La Más Perra	Regional Mexican
XHMS-FM	99.5 FM	Monclova	Radio Medios de Monclova, S.A. de C.V.	Super FM	
XHPL-FM	99.7 FM	Ciudad Acuña	Radioblogs, S.A. de C.V.	Globo	Spanish adult contemporary
XHCCAQ-FM	99.7 FM	Sabinas	Señal Interactiva, S.A. de C.V.	La Patrona	Regional Mexican
XHELA-FM	99.9 FM	Candela	Gobierno del Estado de Coahuila	Radio Coahuila	Public radio
XHETOR-FM	99.9 FM	Matamoros	Radio Informativa, S.A. de C.V.	La Lupe	
XHSG-FM	99.9 FM	Piedras Negras	Impulsora Radial del Norte, S.A. de C.V.	Vida FM	Adult contemporary
XHINS-FM	100.1 FM	Saltillo	Instituto Tecnológico de Saltillo	Radio Tec	University radio
XHTF-FM	100.3 FM	Monclova	Raúl Eduardo Martínez Ramón	Estéreo Tiempo	Variety
XHEN-FM	100.3 FM	Torreón	GIM Televisión Nacional, S.A. de C.V.	Imagen Radio	News/talk
XHHAC-FM	100.7 FM	Ciudad Acuña	La Grande de Coahuila, S.A. de C.V.	La Mejor	Regional Mexican
XHVM-FM	100.9 FM	Piedras Negras	Emisora del Norte, S.A. de C.V.	Back FM	Spanish classic hits
XHWGR-FM	101.1 FM	Monclova	Radio XEMF, S.A. de C.V.	Exa FM	Pop
XHMPO-FM	101.1 FM	Ocampo	Gobierno del Estado de Coahuila	Radio Coahuila	Public radio
XHCPN-FM	101.7 FM	Piedras Negras	XECPN-AM, S.A. de C.V.	@FM	Pop
XHCSGY-FM	101.9 FM	Monclova	Fundación Radio Coahuila, A.C.	—N/a	—N/a
XHUMI-FM	101.9 FM	Torreón	Universidad Millennium Internacional, S.C.	Radio Millennium	University Radio
XHCST-FM	102.3 FM	Castaños	Gobierno del Estado de Coahuila	Radio Coahuila	Public radio
XHGEC-FM	102.3 FM	Ciudad Acuña	Gobierno del Estado de Coahuila	Radio Coahuila	Public radio
XHPEEN-FM	102.3 FM	Sabinas	Fundación de la Radio Cultural, A.C.	Espacio	Cultural
XHSMC-FM	102.3 FM	Sierra Mojada	Gobierno del Estado de Coahuila	Radio Coahuila	Public radio
XHNPC-FM	102.5 FM	Piedras Negras	Gobierno del Estado de Coahuila	Radio Coahuila	Public radio
XHSHT-FM	102.5 FM	Saltillo	XESHT-AM, S.A. de C.V.	Coahuila Hoy Radio	Regional Mexican/News
XHGAS-FM	102.7 FM	Cuatro Ciénegas de Carranza	Gobierno del Estado de Coahuila	Radio Coahuila	Public radio
XHRCA-FM	102.7 FM	Torreón	Radio Informativa, S.A. de C.V.	Ke Buena	Regional Mexican
XHUIZ-FM	102.9 FM	Ciudad Melchor Múzquiz	Gobierno del Estado de Coahuila	Radio Coahuila	Public radio
XHKD-FM	103.1 FM	Ciudad Acuña	Radiodifusora XEKD, S.A.	Digital 103.1	Pop
XHWQ-FM	103.1 FM	Monclova	La Primera de Coahuila, S.A. de C.V.	WQ La Super Estación	
XHSJ-FM	103.3 FM	Saltillo	Herciana Frecuencia, S.A. de C.V.	SJ	News/talk
XHPCH-FM	103.5 FM	Parras de la Fuente	Gobierno del Estado de Coahuila	Radio Coahuila	Public radio
XHLZ-FM	103.5 FM	Torreón	Radiodifusoras Capital, S.A. de C.V.	Región	
XHEMU-FM	103.7 FM	Piedras Negras	Claudio Mario Bres Garza	La Rancherita del Aire	
XHRF-FM	103.9 FM	Ciudad Acuña	Instituto Mexicano de la Radio	La Poderosa	Public radio
XHCCG-FM	104.1 FM	Monclova	Radio Medios de Coahuila, S.A. de C.V.	La Furia	Regional Mexican
XHUACS-FM	104.1 FM	Saltillo	Universidad Autónoma de Coahuila	Radio Universidad	University radio
XHVUN-FM	104.3 FM	Villa Unión	Organización Radiofónica del Norte, S.A. de C.V.	La Consentida	
XHCCAO-FM	104.5 FM	Parras de la Fuente	Melchor Sánchez de la Fuente	Magic 104.5	
XHCPBZ-FM	104.7 FM	Torreón	Instituto Mexicano de la Radio	Altavoz Radio	Public radio
XHMDA-FM	104.9 FM	Monclova	Multigrabaciones del Norte, S.A. de C.V.	Ke Buena	Regional Mexican
XHKS-FM	104.9 FM	Saltillo	Radio Organización Saltillo (Rossa), S.A.	XHKS	
XHRCG-FM	105.1 FM	Ciudad Acuña	Elida Treviño González	La Banda de la 105.1	Regional Mexican
XHYD-FM	105.1 FM	Francisco I. Madero	Radiodifusora XEYD-AM, S.A. de C.V.	Capullo FM	
XHYJ-FM	105.1 FM	Nueva Rosita	Radiotelevisión Norteña, S.A. de C.V.	Viva FM	
XHPECO-FM	105.5 FM	Frontera	Pamela Verenice García Aguirre	Familiar FM	Christian
XHCSDG-FM	105.5 FM	Matamoros	RYTSM, A.C.	—N/a	—N/a
XHRE-FM	105.5 FM	Piedras Negras	XHMED, S.A. de C.V.	Vida Romántica	Romantic
XHDE-FM	105.7 FM	Arteaga	GIM Televisión Nacional, S.A. de C.V.	La Lupe	Adult hits
XHBX-FM	105.9 FM	Sabinas	Radiodifusoras Coahuila, S.A.	La Primera	
XHQN-FM	105.9 FM	Torreón	Transmisora Regional Radio Fórmula, S.A. de C.V.	Radio Fórmula	News/talk
XHPSP-FM	106.3 FM	Piedras Negras	XHPSP-FM, S.A. de C.V.	Coahuila Hoy Radio	Regional Mexican/News
XHZCN-FM	106.5 FM	Saltillo	TVRestringida del Norte, S.A. de C.V.	Digital 106.5	Pop
XHEPQ-FM	106.7 FM	La Loma	Organización Radiofónica del Norte, S.A. de C.V.	La Sabrosita	
XHCLO-FM	107.1 FM	Monclova	Señal Interactiva, S.A. de C.V.	La Caliente	Regional
XHPNS-FM	107.1 FM	Piedras Negras	Radio Frontera de Coahuila, S.A. de C.V.	Exa FM	Pop
XHSICA-FM	107.5 FM	Piedras Negras	Comunidad Indígena Kikapú (Kikaapoa) de Coahuila de Zaragoza	Radio Kickapoo	Indigenous
XHPC-FM	107.9 FM	Piedras Negras	Radio Zócalo, S.A. de C.V.	Súper Estelar	Regional Mexican

== Defunct stations ==
- XHHCC-FM 97.3, Hércules, Sierra Mojada
