= 94.7 FM =

FM radio frequency

The following radio stations broadcast on the FM frequency 94.7 MHz:

== Algeria ==
- Jil FM : Also broadcast two webradios : "Jil FM Web" and "Jil FM Musique".

== Argentina ==
- 947 Club Octubre in Buenos Aires
- Ahijuna in Bernal, Buenos Aires
- Ciudad in Bahía Blanca, Buenos Aires
- Ciudad in Carcaraña, Santa Fe
- Concierto in Santa Fe de la Vera Cruz, Santa Fe
- Concierto in Guandacol, La Rioja
- del Plata in La Rioja
- Impacto in Taco Pozo, Chaco
- Lasers in La Plata, Buenos Aires
- La Minga in Villa Giardino, Córdoba
- La única in Pilar, Buenos Aires
- Loca Suelta in Córdoba
- Natagala in Resistencia, Chaco
- Palermo in Buenos Aires
- Positivo in Azul, Buenos Aires
- Radio María in Junín, Buenos Aires
- Radio María in Presidente Roque Saenz Peña, Chaco
- Radio María in Villa Angela, Chaco
- Radio María in Cruz del Eje, Córdoba
- Radio María in Zapala, Neuquén
- Sol in Esquel, Chubut
- TX in Villa Gobernador Gálvez, Santa Fe
- Uno in Funes, Santa Fe

== Australia ==
- 2MCE in Orange, New South Wales
- Triple J in Tamworth, New South Wales
- ABC Classic in Cairns, Queensland
- Hot FM in Emerald, Queensland
- 3PLS in Geelong, Victoria

== Canada (Channel 234) ==
- CBWI-FM in Ilford, Manitoba
- CFAO-FM in Alliston, Ontario
- CFEB-FM in Nikamo, Quebec
- CFLW-FM in Wabush, Newfoundland and Labrador
- CHEY-FM in Trois Rivieres, Quebec
- CHGS-FM in Geraldton, Ontario
- CHKF-FM in Calgary, Alberta
- CHKX-FM in Hamilton/Burlington, Ontario
- CHOZ-FM in St. John's, Newfoundland and Labrador
- CIAM-FM-6 in Hines Creek, Alberta
- CILC-FM in Celista, British Columbia
- CIRP-FM in Spryfield, Nova Scotia
- CIRX-FM-2 in Fort St. James, British Columbia
- CJDS-FM in St-Pamphile, Quebec
- CJLS-FM-3 in Yarmouth, Nova Scotia
- CJNE-FM in Nipawin, Saskatchewan
- CKGN-FM-1 in Smooth Rock Falls, Ontario
- CKKQ-FM-1 in Sooke, British Columbia
- CKLF-FM in Brandon, Manitoba
- VF2534 in Cherryville, British Columbia

== China ==
- CNR Business Radio in Yingkou
- CNR Music Radio in Jilin City
- CNR The Voice of China in Changde
- SMG Classic 947 Radio in Shanghai

== Ireland ==
- Spin South West - North Tipperary transmitter

== Israel ==
- Radio 90FM in Hefer Valley

== Japan ==
- MRT Radio in Miyazaki
- SBS Radio in Hamamatsu, Shizuoka

== Malaysia ==
- TraXX FM in Maran, Pahang

== Mexico ==
- XHDEN-FM in Lázaro Cárdenas, Michoacán
- XHDK-FM in Guadalajara, Jalisco
- XHETS-FM in Tapachula, Chiapas
- XHGAP-FM in Guadalupe, Zacatecas
- XHHB-FM in Hermosillo, Sonora (plus 14 relay transmitters on 94.7)
- XHJUX-FM in Santiago Juxtlahuaca, Oaxaca
- XHLI-FM in Chilpancingo, Guerrero
- XHOZ-FM in Querétaro, Querétaro
- XHPEBI-FM in León, Guanajuato
- XHPENS-FM in Ensenada, Baja California
- XHPW-FM in Poza Rica, Veracruz
- XHRCF-FM in Tuxtla Gutiérrez, Chiapas
- XHRP-FM in Saltillo, Coahuila
- XHST-FM in Mazatlán, Sinaloa
- XHTJ-FM in Gómez Palacio, Durango
- XHTSI-FM in Parangaricutiro, Michoacán
- XHXU-FM in Frontera, Coahuila

== Philippines ==
- DWLL in Manila
- DYLL-FM in Cebu City
- DXLL-FM in Davao City
- DWCZ in Legazpi City

== South Africa ==
- 947

== Trinidad and Tobago ==
- Star 947

== United Kingdom ==
- BBC Hereford & Worcester in Hereford

== United States (Channel 234) ==
- KAMX in Luling, Texas
- KBSO in Corpus Christi, Texas
- KCLH in Caledonia, Minnesota
- KCNB in Chadron, Nebraska
- KDNY-LP in Hope, Arkansas
- KEWB (FM) in Anderson, California
- KFLG in Big River, California
- KGRW in Friona, Texas
- KHWC-LP in Harrison, Montana
- KIXY in San Angelo, Texas
- KJBB-LP in Brownsboro, Texas
- KJNN-LP in Holbrook, Arizona
- KKCK in Springfield, Minnesota
- KKDO in Fair Oaks, California
- KLBU in Santa Fe, New Mexico
- KLJK in Weiner, Arkansas
- KLOB in Thousand Palms, California
- KMCH in Manchester, Iowa
- KMCN in Clinton, Iowa
- KMMS-FM in Bozeman, Montana
- KNEN in Norfolk, Nebraska
- KNRK in Camas, Washington
- KOKQ in Oklahoma City, Oklahoma
- KPIP-LP in Fayette, Missouri
- KPZX in Paducah, Texas
- KQOP-LP in Charles City, Iowa
- KRKS in Lafayette, Colorado
- KRRM in Rogue River, Oregon
- KRYE in Beulah, Colorado
- KSHE in Crestwood, Missouri
- KSKU in Sterling, Kansas
- KSWC-LP in Winfield, Kansas
- KTTS in Springfield, Missouri
- KTWV in Los Angeles, California
- KTXO in Goldsmith, Texas
- KUMU in Honolulu, Hawaii
- KVDR in Brackettville, Texas
- KVLL-FM in Wells, Texas
- KWCB-LP in Wasco, California
- KWKQ in Graham, Texas
- KWXX in Hilo, Hawaii
- KYHD in Valliant, Oklahoma
- KYHW-LP in Gardnerville, Nevada
- KYSE in El Paso, Texas
- KYTF-LP in Blair, Nebraska
- KZAL in Manson, Washington
- KZGF in Grand Forks, North Dakota
- KZND in Houston, Alaska
- WAAK-LP in Boynton, Georgia
- WAAW in Williston, South Carolina
- WBAR in Lake Luzerne, New York
- WBCQ-FM in Monticello, Maine
- WBIO in Philpot, Kentucky
- WBRX in Cresson, Pennsylvania
- WBZK in Taylor, Mississippi
- WCEB in Deposit, New York
- WCSX in Birmingham, Michigan
- WCVM in Bronson, Michigan
- WDEC in Americus, Georgia
- WDSD in Dover, Delaware
- WELK in Elkins, West Virginia
- WFBQ in Indianapolis, Indiana
- WFBU-LP in Graceville, Florida
- WGLJ-LP in Gainesville, Florida
- WGSQ in Cookeville, Tennessee
- WIAD in Bethesda, Maryland
- WJCR-LP in Jasper, Tennessee
- WJLV in Jackson, Mississippi
- WJVQ-LP in Poughkeepsie, New York
- WKIU-LP in Tupelo, Mississippi
- WKLW in Paintsville, Kentucky
- WLGK in New Albany, Indiana
- WLIX-LP in Ridge, New York
- WLS in Chicago, Illinois
- WLYT-LP in Mooresville, North Carolina
- WMAS-FM in Enfield, Connecticut
- WMHI in Cape Vincent, New York
- WMTT-FM in Tioga, Pennsylvania
- WNHN-LP in Concord, New Hampshire
- WODA in Bayamon, Puerto Rico
- WOJG in Bolivar, Tennessee
- WOZZ in Mosinee, Wisconsin
- WPES-LP in Savannah, Georgia
- WPHR in Gifford, Florida
- WQDR-FM in Raleigh, North Carolina
- WQLR in Chateaugay, New York
- WSNY in Columbus, Ohio
- WTBF in Brundidge, Alabama
- WULK in Crawfordville, Georgia
- WVFP-LP in Gainesville, Florida
- WWBD in Sumter, South Carolina
- WWEZ-LP in Saint Simons Island, Georgia
- WXBB in Erie, Pennsylvania
- WXBK in Newark, New Jersey
- WYLK in Lacombe, Louisiana
- WZOR in Mishicot, Wisconsin
- WZYK in Clinton, Kentucky

== Uruguay ==
- Emisora del Sur in Montevideo
