= XHMAP-TDT =

Independent television station in Monclova, Coahuila, Mexico

- Monclova, Coahuila; Mexico
- Channels: Digital: 36 (UHF); Virtual: 29
- Branding: Canal 29

Programming
- Affiliations: Independent

Ownership
- Owner: Frente Ciudadano Pro-Antena Parabólica de Monclova, A.C.

History
- Founded: 1987
- Former channel numbers: 7 (analog, 1987-2016)
- Call sign meaning: Monclova Antena Parabólica

Technical information
- Licensing authority: CRT
- ERP: 16.723 kW
- HAAT: −87 m (−285 ft)
- Transmitter coordinates: 26°51′43″N 101°25′11″W

Links
- Website: www.facebook.com/Monclovacanal29/

XHMAP-TDT is a local noncommercial television station in Monclova, Coahuila, broadcasting on virtual channel 29 from Loma de La Bartola.

== History ==
The Frente Ciudadano Pro-Antena Parabólica de Monclova, A.C., (Note: The name on the official books until 2017 was Comité Pro-Antena Parabólica de Monclova, A.C. The Secretariat of Foreign Relations instead assigned the other name. See this IFT authorization.) which was owned by the local chapter of a miners' union, received two television station permits at the same time on October 23, 1987: one for XHMAP-TV on channel 7, and the other for XHOPA-TV on channel 13. XHMAP and XHOPA were primarily intended to improve the available local television service in town, though they each broadcast at a power of 300 watts; there was no national television service in Monclova when they were awarded. XHOPA eventually disappeared.

XHMAP, meanwhile, cycled through various programming sources over the years. It carried Galavisión, Telemundo and both Imevisión networks at various times. Ultimately, the station began rebroadcasting XHRCG-TV from Saltillo.

On August 18, 2009, miners from the union seized XHMAP-TV and shut the station down. They sought to regain control of the station and hoped to modernize its antiquated transmission equipment. The miners also alleged that the president and secretary of the Comité Pro-Antena Parabólica had made a deal to allow the station to rebroadcast XHRCG.

After 2009, the station's programming source changed again, to channel 4 on the local cable system operated by Núcleo Radio Televisión, a company of Rolando González Treviño. NRT owned the cable system, the channel and local FM stations XHWGR-FM and XHEMF-FM. In 2014, after the arrest of González Treviño in the United States on money laundering charges, XHMAP went off the air.

In 2016, XHMAP migrated to digital television on physical channel 36. As Azteca 7 was assigned virtual channel 7 nationwide, virtual channel 29 was given to XHMAP to broadcast. In May 2017, XHMAP relaunched as Canal 29 with a local schedule of programs. The relaunched XHMAP exposed itself to criticism that it was being run commercially, even though it is a noncommercial station; the concessionaire claimed that Hiradier Huerta Medrano, former miners' union leader, was making money off the sale of advertisements on XHMAP.
