= XHPSP-FM =

Radio station in Piedras Negras, Coahuila

- Piedras Negras, Coahuila; Mexico
- Frequency: 106.3 MHz
- Branding: Coahuila Hoy Radio

Programming
- Format: Regional Mexican

Ownership
- Owner: Grupo Radiorama; (XHPSP-FM, S.A. de C.V.)
- Operator: Grupo M Radio
- Sister stations: By ownership: XHCPN-FM, XHRE-FM, XHSG-FM

History
- First air date: October 4, 1994 (concession)

Technical information
- Licensing authority: CRT
- Class: B
- ERP: 14.617 kW
- HAAT: 49.1 m (161 ft)

Links
- Website: www.grupomradio.mx

XHPSP-FM is a radio station on 106.3 FM in Piedras Negras, Coahuila, Mexico. It is owned by Radiorama and operated by Grupo M Radio, broadcasting as Coahuila Hoy Radio.

== History ==
XHPSP received its concession on October 4, 1994. It has been owned by Radiorama for its entire existence.

On October 6, 2025, Grupo M Radio leased the station and XHSHT-FM in Saltillo to broadcast its Coahuila Hoy Radio programming.
