= Judas Kalid =

Héctor Inés Hernández Aguiñaga
- Born: Héctor Inés Hernández Aguiñaga; July 1, 1984 (age 42); Piedras Negras, Coahuila, Mexico
- Occupations: Writer, poet, illustrator
- Writing career
- Pen name: Judas Kalid, Hector I.
- Genres: Occultism, poetry
- Notable works: El Árbol de Judas, El Nuevo Testamento Satanista
- Movement: Esotericism

Héctor Inés Hernández Aguiñaga (born in Piedras Negras, Coahuila on July 1, 1984), better known by the pseudonym Judas Kalid and sometimes as Hector I., is a Mexican occult writer, poet, and illustrator.

== Early life ==
Hernández Aguiñaga's childhood was marked by a strong religious influence. The first book he read was the Book of Revelation (The Red Book of the Apocalypse), a reading that would later define his poetic style, characterized by religious and supernatural undertones.

== Career ==
His literary work is often released on dates of esoteric significance, particularly on Samhain (October 31). On April 30, 2019, he published El Árbol de Judas, followed by an extended version on October 31 of the same year. During the same period, he collaborated with the occultist Mikky Lafey on the extended edition of El Nuevo Testamento Satanista. His later work, Secretos de Demonios (2024), continues his exploration of demonology and occult iconography.

== Bibliography ==
=== Solo works ===
- El Árbol de Judas (First edition) (April 30, 2019)
- El Árbol de Judas (Extended edition) (October 31, 2019)
- Secretos de Demonios (First edition) (October 31, 2024)

=== Collaborations ===
- El Nuevo Testamento Satanista - El Libro de la Bestia (with Mikky Lafey) (October 31, 2019)
- Secretos de Demonios (with Mikky Lafey) (October 31, 2024)

== See also ==
- Occultism
- Demonology
