= XHRE-FM =

Two Mexican radio stations bear the XHRE-FM callsign:

- XHRE-FM (Coahuila), 105.5 FM "Vida Romántica" in Piedras Negras, Coahuila
- XHRE-FM (Guanajuato), 88.1 FM "La Comadre" in Celaya, Guanajuato (combo with XERE-AM)
