= Mikky Lafey =

Mexican philosopher and media personality

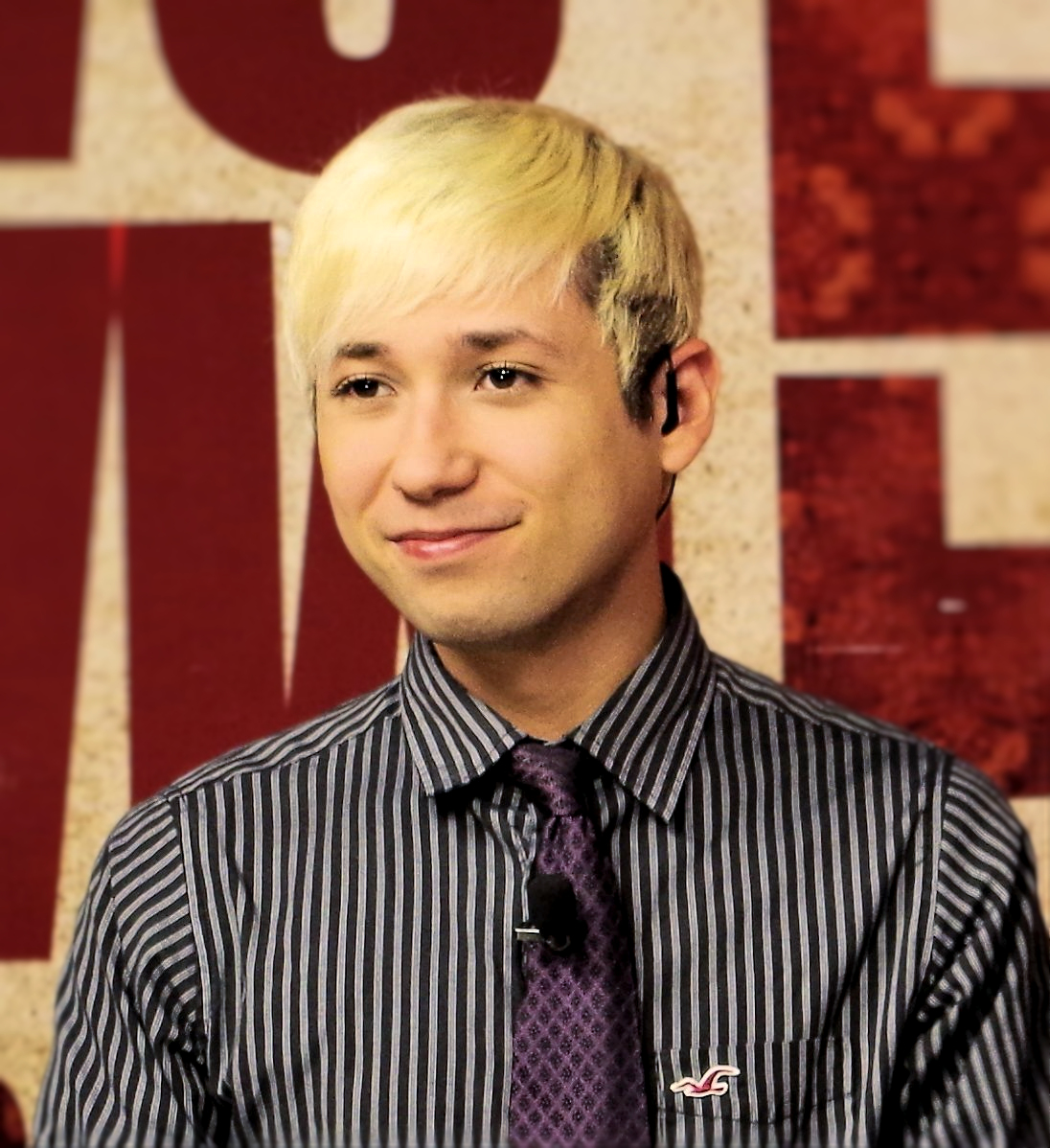
- Mikky Lafey on Television in April 2014
- Born: Miguel Gerardo Diego Talamantes; 29 November 1988 (age 37); Piedras Negras, Coahuila, Mexico

Education
- Education: Information and communications technology, Informatics Systems Area

Philosophical work
- Era: Hypermodernity
- Region: Hermetism
- Main interests: Ontology; Metaphysics Philosophy of art; Philosophy of technology; Language; Satanism; Alchemy Poetry; Psychology

Miguel Gerardo Diego Talamantes, better known as Mikky Lafey, (born 29 November 1988 in Piedras Negras) is a Mexican "philosopher", writer, editor, poet, novelist, illustrator, occultist, producer, television presenter, podcaster and radio personality.

== Early life ==
Lafey displayed a voracious appetite for reading and writing from an early age. He grew up surrounded by didactic and literary stimuli, with access to a generous library that allowed him to familiarize himself with classic works. At the age of eight, he began writing precociously, composing his first poem, Morris (1998), dedicated to his cat. Included in his book of poetry collection "Las Luces Imperecederas" (The Imperishable Lights) in 2022. His favorite childhood readings included Oscar Wilde's tales, such as "The Selfish Giant" and "The Happy Prince". Initially, his production focused on verse before he mastered prose. A crucial event in his early years was the loss of his first philosophical novel, written on a HP 300LX Palmtop in 1997. The work was permanently erased due to a battery interruption in the device's incipient memory. This incident marked a pause in his "professional" writing until 2012, when he resumed his work with a more intense focus on philosophy, alchemy, hermeticism, and the New Age ideology, seeking to establish a new paradigm of knowledge.

== Television and Press ==
Mikky Lafey made his television debut in 2012 in the now defunct magazine program El Café Expresso for SuperMedios of Coahuila, with a brief section called "El Chal" but left shortly after to join the cast of another TV show, Hombres de Marte y Plutón (Men from Mars and Pluto) with Alejandro Wong and Chuy Uresti – both transmitted by the SuperChannel22 channel, improving his notoriety by exposing taboos, sexuality and the friendship between heterosexuals and homosexuals, with a 'radio version' of the show launched in 2014, ending by the mid 2017, transmitted on EXAFM 105.5 (XHRE-FM). Acting as interviewer, Lafey has interviewed various personalities from the art world, presenting both on radio and television. First in 2012, on radio, he interviewed Camilo Lara from Mexican Institute of Sound. In 2013, he interviewed Babo of Cartel de Santa, then in 2014, he interviewed Gabriel Montiel Gutiérrez (Werevertumorro), and Erik Canales, the vocalist of the Mexican rock band Allison, just to name a few. In 2015, he obtained an exclusive interview with Mario Bautista, Sebastian Yatra and the Latin Grammy Award-nominated Vázquez Sounds. On 28 February 2018, he made an exclusive interview to Lena Katina of t.A.T.u. and was presented on Mikky Lafey On Air by telephone link.

== Literary output ==
Escritos de Demonios ("Writings of Demons") his debut book with essays and sacred geometry was published on 4 March 2017. In late October 2019, Mikky Lafey was in front of a more considerable audience, according to their profile-page on Facebook dedicated to their second work (and also third because it has 2 editions), he reach more than 21,000 likes, generating a positive response in this social network after waiting for his next work in this interval with his new readers. In the last week of May 2019, his second book of philosophy and occultism called "El Nuevo Testamento Satanista" reach the number 3 on the list of "The 100 best-selling books of Amazon Kindle" and remains there for a week. Then, the author announces that a new release, an "extended version" with the collaboration of Judas Kalid, "El Nuevo Testamento Satanista: El Libro de La Bestia" (The extended edition of "El Desplome de la Pluma") generated now a much greater expectation of how it was in the first edition on 31 October 2018. Mikky Lafey becomes a best seller author and all happened during the presale of his third book, started on 15 April 2019 and until 15 October, during the interval prior to its launch, the book has remained in the top sales in its formats of "ebooks" on Amazon Kindle for more than 5 consecutive months in the categories of "Philosophy of good and evil" in position No. 9 for more than 5 weeks, and then, going to No. 10 in the category of "Paganism and Neo-Paganism" taking position No. 4 of Amazon Kindle platform. Mikky Lafey published his first books using an Alter ego called "Aposento". Sacred geometry is present in almost all of his artworks. In 2020, made a collaboration with an author named Asahel Ivel on a new philosophical novel and Ontology work: Dialéctica del Ser, a Bildungsroman or "coming-of-age story", launched on 1 January 2020, and the second part on 30 April 2020. On 27 June 2020, Lafey launches Rebis: El Estado Primordial, a book about Alchemy, Initiatic philosophy and Hermeticism, for free on digital download in Apple Books, Google Play Books and other platforms, also a physical format was published on the same date exclusive on Amazon.

== Poetic work ==
His work as a symbolist poet is concentrated in more than two hundred poems written in verse within his book Las Luces Imperecederas (The Imperishable Lights) (2022). His lyrical work tends to address alchemical and cosmic themes, and is influenced by authors like Arthur Rimbaud, whom he cites at the beginning of his poetry book. Lafey's poetry has been included in anthologies from the academic sphere, as seen in Poemario: Al Universo - Antología de la Poesía Estelar (Poetry Collection: To the Universe – Anthology of Stellar Poetry), a volume that includes the poem "Besos de Luz" ("Kisses of Light"), characterized by its quality of evoking stellar and sidereal landscapes. This same composition has likewise been integrated into another poetic compilation titled Antología de las Estrellas (Anthology of the Stars).

== Books ==
- Escritos de Demonios (First Edition) (4 March 2017).
- El Nuevo Testamento Satanista: El Desplome de la Pluma (First Edition) (31 October 2018).
- El Árbol de Judas (First Edition) by Judas Kalid (As Editor and illustrator) (30 April 2019).
- Escritos de Demonios (Special Edition) (16 July 2019).
- El Nuevo Testamento Satanista: El Libro de La Bestia (Extended Edition) (31 October 2019).
- El Árbol de Judas (Extended Version) by Judas Kalid (As co-producer and illustrator) (31 October 2019).
- Dialéctica del Ser – Tomo I: Ping with Asahel Ivel (1 January 2020).
- Dialéctica del Ser – Tomo II: Pong with Asahel Ivel (30 April 2020).
- Rebis: El Estado Primordial (27 June 2020).
- Las luces imperecederas (11 July 2022).
- Secretos de Demonios with Judas Kalid (31 October 2024).
- Dialéctica del Ser – Tomo III: Suma Prime with Asahel Ivel (2 October 2025).

== Radio ==
- Hombres de Marte y Plutón EXAFM Version (XHRE-FM) (2013–2014)
- Que Fuerte! (2014)
- Los Hijos del Rock, with Vero Diego (2015 – August 2016)
- Desvelados. (2016)
- Rock'n Exa. (2017)
- El Ying y El Yang, with Corey Toledo. (2017)
- La Botana EXActa. (2018–2019)
- Mikky Lafey On Air (XHRE EXAFM 105.5) (2013–2019)
- Almas Descarriadas (XHSL-FM) (2015–August to 2016), (2019–2020)

== Television ==
- El Café Expresso (2012), (2014)
- Hombres de Marte y Plutón (2012–2014)

== Published illustrations & paintings by Lafey ==
- The 13th Cosmic Collapse, 3 October 2016.
- Escritos de Demonios (FOB Illustration), ASIN:B06XFZWJRL, 4 March 2017.
- Metáfora – Kechua Diego (EP Artwork), ASIN: B07PNFJ3GS, 23 February 2019.
- El Árbol de Judas (FOB Illustration), ASIN: B07R24MDG8, 30 April 2019.

== Bibliography ==
- de Demonios, Escritos (2017). Mikky Lafey. ISBN 978-138-65-0438-2.
- de Judas, El Árbol (2019). Judas Kalid. ISBN 978-138-64-7980-2.

== See also ==
- Ontology
- Alchemy
- New Age
