= XHTSI-FM =

Radio station in Nuevo San Juan Parangaricutiro, Michoacán

Nuevo San Juan Parangaricutiro, Michoacán; Mexico
- Frequency: 94.7 MHz
- Branding: Radio Tsipikua

Programming
- Format: Community

Ownership
- Owner: Kurhándi, A.C.

History
- First air date: May 18, 2015 (concession)
- Call sign meaning: TSIpekua

Technical information
- Class: A
- ERP: .151 kW
- HAAT: -46.72 m
- Transmitter coordinates: 19.416754°N 102.132554°W

Links
- Website: tsipekua947nsjp.wix.com/tsipikua947

XHTSI-FM is a community radio station in Nuevo San Juan Parangaricutiro, Michoacán, broadcasting on 94.7 FM. It is owned by Kurhándi, A.C., and is known as Radio Tsipikua.
