= XHMDA-FM =

Radio station in Monclova, Coahuila

- Monclova, Coahuila; Mexico
- Frequency: 104.9 MHz
- Branding: Ke Buena

Programming
- Format: Regional Mexican
- Affiliations: Radiópolis

Ownership
- Owner: GRM Radio; (Multigrabaciones del Norte, S.A. de C.V.)

History
- First air date: March 26, 1997 (concession)

Technical information
- Licensing authority: CRT
- Class: B1
- ERP: 25 kW
- HAAT: −29.33 m (−96.2 ft)
- Transmitter coordinates: 26°54′14″N 101°24′45″W

Links
- Website: www.grmradio.com.mx

XHMDA-FM is a radio station on 104.9 FM in Monclova, Coahuila. It is owned by GRM Radio and airs the Ke Buena national Regional Mexican format from Radiópolis.

== History ==
XEMDA-AM 1170 received its concession on March 26, 1997. It was a 500-watt daytimer originally owned by Radiorama subsidiary Comunicación y Cultura, S.A. In February 1999, Karam, who owned GRM, bought XEMDA from Radiorama in exchange for XECPN-AM in Piedras Negras. Under GRM, XEMDA began operating with 1,000 watts during the day and 500 at night.

In January 2012, XEMDA was authorized to migrate to FM on 104.9 MHz.
