= XESORN-AM =

Radio station in Saltillo, Coahuila

- Saltillo, Coahuila; Mexico
- Frequency: 610 AM
- Branding: Viva Saltillo

Programming
- Format: News/talk

Ownership
- Owner: Grupo M; (Organización Radiofónica del Norte, S.A. de C.V.)

History
- First air date: July 18, 2018
- Call sign meaning: Saltillo Organización Radiofónica del Norte

Technical information
- Licensing authority: CRT
- Class: C
- Power: 1 kW day
- Transmitter coordinates: 25°22′33″N 100°59′45″W

Links
- Webcast: Listen live
- Website: grupomradio.mx

XESORN-AM is a radio station on 610 AM in Saltillo, Coahuila, Mexico. It is owned by Grupo M and known as Viva Saltillo.

== History ==
XESORN was awarded in the IFT-4 radio auction of 2017 and began testing on July 18, 2018. The 610 frequency had previously been occupied by XESAC-AM.
