= XHRCF-FM =

Radio station in Tuxtla Gutiérrez, Chiapas, Mexico

- Tuxtla Gutiérrez, Chiapas; Mexico
- Frequency: 94.7 FM
- Branding: La Nueva FM 94.7

Programming
- Format: Talk/cultural

Ownership
- Owner: José Rodolfo Calvo Fonseca

History
- First air date: August 29, 2012
- Call sign meaning: José Rodolfo Calvo Fonseca

Technical information
- Class: A
- ERP: 0.679 kW
- HAAT: -232.3 m
- Transmitter coordinates: 16.758666°N 93.145137°W

Links
- Website: www.lanuevafm.com.mx/radio/

XHRCF-FM is a noncommercial radio station on 94.7 FM in Tuxtla Gutiérrez, Chiapas, Mexico. The station is owned by José Rodolfo Calvo Fonseca and is known as La Nueva FM 94.7.

== History ==
XHRCF received its permit on August 29, 2012. It is co-owned with the Chiapas Hoy newspaper.
