= Francisco Ríos =

Mexican baseball player (born 1995)

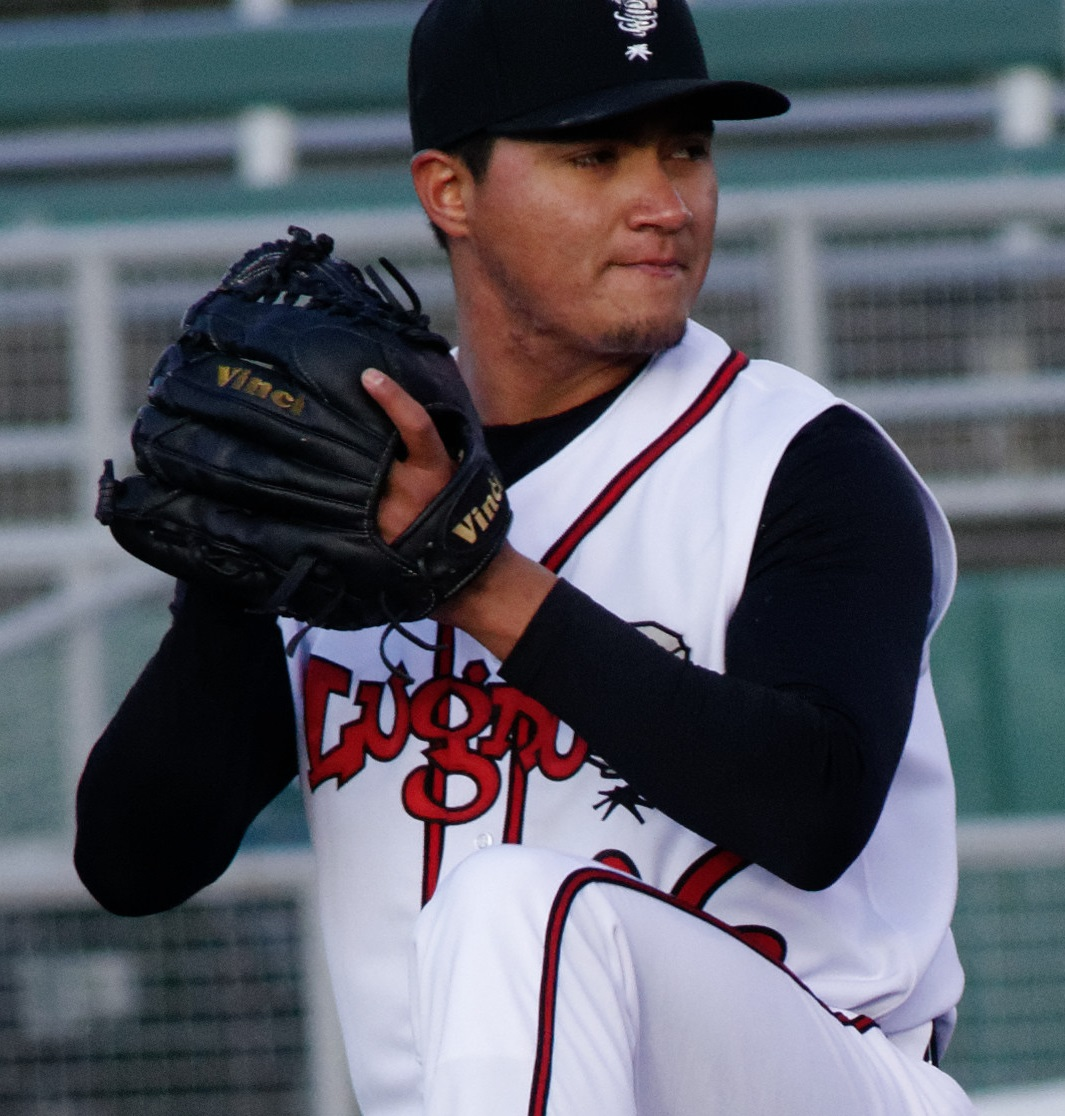
- Ríos with the Lansing Lugnuts in 2016

Leones de Yucatán – No. 58
- Pitcher
- Born: May 6, 1995 (age 31); Monclova, Coahuila, Mexico
- Bats: Right Throws: Right
- Stats at Baseball Reference
Medals
Men's baseball
Representing Mexico
2019 WBSC Premier12
Bronze medal – third place	2019 Tokyo	National team

Jesus Francisco Ríos Alfaro (born May 6, 1995) is a Mexican professional baseball pitcher for the Leones de Yucatán of the Mexican League.

== Career ==
=== Toronto Blue Jays ===
Ríos signed with the Toronto Blue Jays as an international free agent on July 20, 2012. He made his professional debut in 2013 with the Dominican Summer League Blue Jays, appearing in 15 games. In 52 1/3 innings pitched, Ríos would post a 4–6 win–loss record, 4.47 earned run average (ERA), and 48 strikeouts. In the offseason, he played with the Tomateros de Culiacán of the Mexican Pacific League. Ríos spent 2014 with the Rookie-Advanced Bluefield Blue Jays, and pitched to a 3–2 record, 5.91 ERA, and 38 strikeouts in 53 1/3 innings.

Ríos was promoted to the Low–A Vancouver Canadians for the 2015 season, and in 15 total appearances, posted a 3–6 win–loss record, 4.27 ERA, and 59 strikeouts in 65 1/3 innings pitched. He was assigned to the Single–A Lansing Lugnuts to open the 2016 season. In 6 starts, Ríos went 2–0 with a 1.20 ERA and 43 strikeouts in 30 total innings. He was promoted to the High–A Dunedin Blue Jays on May 10. In June he was selected to play in the All-Star Futures Game. Ríos made 21 starts and four relief appearances in 2016, and pitched to a 7–6 record, 2.91 ERA, and 108 strikeouts in 120 2/3 innings. Ríos played the entire 2017 season for the Double-A New Hampshire Fisher Cats, pitching to a 3–9 record, 4.29 ERA, and 63 strikeouts in 86 total innings.

On May 28, 2019, Ríos was loaned to the Diablos Rojos del México of the Mexican League. In 19 games, he compiled a 2–1 record and 3.94 ERA with 24 strikeouts over 32 innings pitched. In 9 games split between New Hampshire and the Triple–A Buffalo Bisons, Ríos accumulated a 6.19 ERA with 10 strikeouts across 16 innings. Ríos elected free agency following the season on November 4.

=== New York Mets ===
On December 13, 2019, Ríos signed a minor league contract with the New York Mets organization. He did not play in a game in 2020 due to the cancellation of the minor league season because of the COVID-19 pandemic. Ríos became a free agent on November 2, 2020.

=== Acereros de Monclova ===
On May 20, 2021, Ríos signed with the Acereros de Monclova of the Mexican League. In 13 starts, he went 4–4 with a 4.39 ERA and 64 strikeouts over 67 2/3 innings. Ríos returned in 2022, but was limited to only 6 appearances due to injuries, posting an inflated 17.05 ERA over 6.1 innings. In 2023, he registered a 1–4 record with a 9.25 ERA and 17 strikeouts over 24 1/3 innings pitched.

=== Tigres de Quintana Roo ===
On June 27, 2023, Ríos was loaned to the Tigres de Quintana Roo of the Mexican League for the remainder of the 2023 season. In 3 starts for Quintana Roo, he posted an 0–2 record and 4.66 ERA with 6 strikeouts across 9 2/3 innings pitched. Ríos was placed on the reserve list on July 19.

On May 11, 2024, Ríos was returned to the Acereros de Monclova for the 2024 season. He did not appear with the team and spent the whole season on the reserve list. Ríos was released by Monclova on December 23.

=== Saraperos de Saltillo ===
On December 26, 2024, Ríos signed with the Saraperos de Saltillo of the Mexican League. He was released by Saltillo on April 8, 2025.

=== Caliente de Durango ===
On April 14, 2026, Ríos signed with the Caliente de Durango of the Mexican League. In six relief appearances for Durango, he registered a 7.11 ERA and struck out four batters across 6 1/3 innings pitched. On June 2, Ríos was released by the team.

=== Leones de Yucatán ===
On July 17, 2026, Ríos signed with the Leones de Yucatán of the Mexican League.
