= WISK-FM =

- Americus, Georgia; United States
- Broadcast area: Albany, Georgia
- Frequency: 98.7 MHz
- Branding: Best Country Around 98.7

Programming
- Language: English
- Format: Country music

Ownership
- Owner: Sumter Broadcasting Co., Inc.
- Sister stations: WDEC-FM

History
- First air date: 1978
- Former call signs: WPUR-FM (1978–1979); WPUR (1979–1992)

Technical information
- Licensing authority: FCC
- Facility ID: 63784
- Class: C3
- ERP: 25,000 watts
- HAAT: 92.0 meters (301.8 ft)
- Transmitter coordinates: 32°4′51.00″N 84°15′20.00″W

Links
- Public license information: Public file; LMS
- Website: americusradio.com

WISK-FM (98.7 FM) is a radio station airing a country music format. Licensed to Americus, Georgia, United States, the station serves the Albany area. The station is currently owned by Sumter Broadcasting Co., Inc. and features programming from ABC Radio. Its studios and transmitter are in Americus.

The WISK call sign has been used by other broadcasters, including a short-lived station of the late 1950s in Minneapolis-St. Paul, Minnesota, now known as WREY.
