= Monclova Municipality =

Municipality in the Mexican state of Coahuila

Monclova
- Municipality
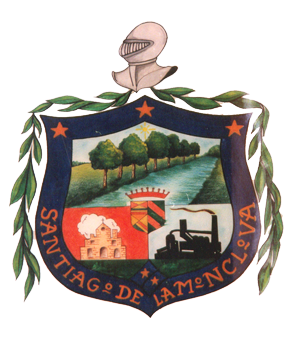
- Coat of arms

- Municipality of Monclova in Coahuila

- Location in Mexico
- Coordinates: 26°54′37″N 101°25′20″W
- Country: Mexico
- State: Coahuila
- Municipal seat: Monclova

Area
  - Total: 1,480 km^{2} (570 sq mi)

Population (2020)
  - Total: 237,951

Monclova is one of the 38 municipalities of Coahuila, in north-eastern Mexico. The municipal seat lies at Monclova. The municipality covers an area of 1480 km^{2}.

As of 2020, according to INEGI, the municipality had a total population of 237,951.
