= Hispana (rapper) =

Mexican musician

- Also known as: Mamba Negra; Mujer de fuego
- Born: Patricia Polet González; Monclova, Mexico
- Genres: Latin pop; hip hop
- Occupations: Rapper; singer; songwriter
- Years active: 2012–present
- Label: Universal Music Mexico

Hispana, also known as Mamba Negra, is a Mexican rapper, singer and songwriter from Monclova, Coahuila, and is one of the most prominent female artists in the Mexican rap scene. Influenced by North American hip-hop but rooted in Spanish rap, Hispana's lyrics reflect and amplify everyday life and are imbued with a social and feminist conscience.

While she began rapping at the age of 13 in Puerto Vallarta, the release of her 7-track EP debut Mamba Negra in 2012 placed her on the Mexican underground hip hop radar. Because she was widely recognized by her mixtape, Hispana decided to also take on the name Mamba Negra to identify herself. Her sophomore album, Los Gonzalez references her last name and is dedicated to her two younger brothers.

Hispana signed with Universal Music Mexico and released her studio album, Mujer de Fuego in 2021. It features collaborations with Niña Dioz, and touches on themes of female empowerment, success and confidence, as well as her Mexican roots. The album was composed during Hispana's pregnancy and recorded during the first months of her maternity, which coincided with the COVID-19 pandemic. This resulted in a more an introspective album, but also forced Hispana to forego the traditional shows and extended promotion expected with a major release. Hispana's style has evolved to experiment with new genres and collaborations. In December 2021, she released the single Andamos a cien featuring Mexican rapper Yoss Bones, with whom she has previously collaborated for the single Tequila y Miel.

Hispana's confidence as a woman in the Latin American hip-hop scene has inspired many other female artists in their work, with her citing Mercedes Sosa, Liliana Felipe and Beyoncé. as own her personal musical inspirations.

== Discography ==
- Mamba Negra (2012)
- Los González (2019)
- Mudando de piel (2020)
- Mujer de fuego (2021)
- MEXA (2025)
