= Sabinas Municipality =

Municipality in the Mexican state of Coahuila

Sabinas
- Municipality
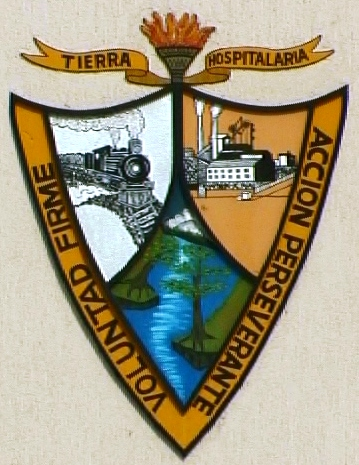
- Coat of arms

- Municipality of Sabinas in Coahuila

- Location in Mexico
- Coordinates: 27°51′10″N 101°7′11″W
- Country: Mexico
- State: Coahuila
- Municipal seat: Sabinas

Area
  - Total: 2,345.2 km^{2} (905.5 sq mi)

Population (2005)
  - Total: 53,042

Sabinas is one of the 38 municipalities of Coahuila, in north-eastern Mexico. The municipal seat lies at Sabinas. The municipality covers an area of 2345.2 km^{2}.

As of 2005, the municipality had a total population of 53,042.
