= XHFRC-FM =

Radio station in Monclova, Coahuila, Mexico

- Monclova, Coahuila; Mexico
- Frequency: 98.7 MHz
- Branding: Espacio 98

Programming
- Format: Cultural

Ownership
- Owner: Radio Medios de Monclova; (Sucesión de Melchor Sánchez Dovalina)
- Sister stations: Commercial: XHMS-FM, XHCCG-FM; Other Espacio stations: XHPEDM-FM Cuatro Ciénegas, XHPEEI-FM Ciudad Acuña, XHPEAD-FM Piedras Negras, XHPEEN-FM Sabinas, XHPEAE-FM Ríoverde, SLP

History
- First air date: 1998; July 9, 1999 (permit)
- Call sign meaning: FReCuencia 98.7 (original name of station)

Technical information
- Licensing authority: CRT
- Class: A
- ERP: 0.748 kW
- HAAT: −34.1 m (−112 ft)
- Transmitter coordinates: 26°55′9.6″N 101°25′25.8″W

Links
- Website: web.archive.org/web/20150217000801/http://radiomedios.org/xhfrc.php

XHFRC-FM is a noncommercial radio station on 98.7 FM in Monclova, Coahuila, Mexico. It is known as Espacio 98 and carries a cultural format.

== History ==
XHFRC received its permit on July 9, 1999.
