= XHRP-FM =

Radio station in Saltillo, Coahuila

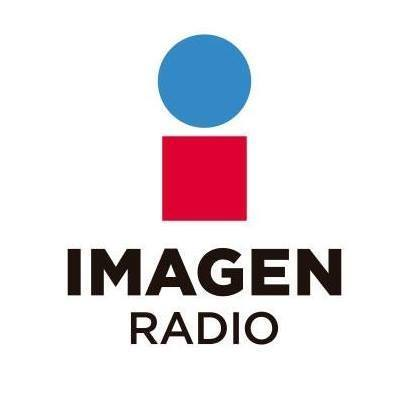
- Saltillo, Coahuila; Mexico
- Broadcast area: Saltillo, Coahuila
- Frequency: 94.7 FM (HD Radio)
- Branding: Imagen Radio

Programming
- Format: News/talk

Ownership
- Owner: Grupo Imagen; (GIM Televisión Nacional, S.A. de C.V.)
- Operator: Compañía Periodística Criterios

History
- First air date: August 24, 1970

Technical information
- Licensing authority: CRT
- Class: B
- ERP: 29.65 kW
- HAAT: −95.53 m (−313.4 ft)
- Transmitter coordinates: 25°24′21″N 101°00′18″W

XHRP-FM is a radio station on 94.7 FM in Saltillo, Coahuila, Mexico. The station is owned by Grupo Imagen and carries its talk format.

== History ==
XHRP signed on the air August 24, 1970 and was the first FM station to operate in Saltillo. It was owned by Guillermo A. Ramos Ochoa. In 1977, the station was sold to Alberto Jaubert Ancira, who owned it alongside XEAJ-AM 1330 and XHAD-TV channel 7. After Jaubert's death in a car accident in 1985, the stations were split up; Alberto Jorge Jaubert Tafich took control of XHRP-FM. On January 13, 2006, XHRP was bought by Grupo Imagen.
