= Braulio Manuel Fernández =

Mexican politician

- Born: June 17, 1941; Torreón, Coahuila, Mexico
- Died: February 12, 2016 (aged 74)
- Occupation: Senator
- Political party: PRI

Braulio Manuel Fernández Aguirre (17 June 1941 – 12 February 2016) was a Mexican politician affiliated with the Institutional Revolutionary Party. He served as Senator of the LXII Legislature of the Mexican Congress representing Coahuila. He also was a member of the Chamber of Deputies during the LIII and LVII Legislatures and Municipal President of Torreón.

He was part of Grupo Radio Estéreo Mayran and was the concessionaire for XHMP-FM, an FM radio station in Torreón.
