= XHCDU-FM =

Radio station in Ciudad Acuña, Coahuila

- Ciudad Acuña, Coahuila; Mexico
- Broadcast area: Ciudad Acuña
- Frequency: 92.9 MHz
- Branding: Super Estelar

Programming
- Format: Grupera

Ownership
- Owner: Grupo Zócalo; (Radio Millenium, S.A. de C.V.)
- Sister stations: Super Channel 12, XHTA-FM, XHIK-FM, XHVM-FM, XHPNS-FM, XHPC-FM

History
- First air date: November 30, 1994

Technical information
- Licensing authority: CRT
- Class: A
- ERP: 3 kW
- HAAT: 19.52 m (64.0 ft)

Links
- Website: superestelar929.com.mx

XHCDU-FM is a radio station in Ciudad Acuña, Coahuila. Broadcasting on 92.9 FM, XHCDU carries a grupera format known as Super Estelar.

== History ==
Televideo Mexicana received the concession for XHCDU in 1994. The station was sold to Radio Millenium, concessionaire for Grupo Zócalo and owner of radio and TV stations in Piedras Negras and Saltillo.
