= XHBX-FM =

Radio station in Sabinas, Coahuila, Mexico

- Sabinas, Coahuila; Mexico
- Broadcast area: Sabinas, Coahuila
- Frequency: 105.9 MHz
- Branding: La Primera

Programming
- Format: Grupera

Ownership
- Owner: GRD Multimedia; (Radiodifusoras Coahuila, S.A.)
- Sister stations: XHESCC-FM

History
- First air date: August 21, 1946 (concession)

Technical information
- Licensing authority: CRT
- Class: B1
- ERP: 25 kW
- HAAT: 82 meters (269 ft)
- Transmitter coordinates: 27°52′40″N 101°08′30″W

Links
- Website: www.radioxebx.com

XHBX-FM is a radio station on 105.9 FM in Sabinas, Coahuila. It is owned by GRD Multimedia and is known as La Primera with a grupera format.

== History ==
XEBX-AM 610 received its concession on August 21, 1946. It operated with 5,000 watts day and 500 watts night. These power levels remained until the AM-FM migration.

It was authorized to move to FM in 2011.
