= XHJUX-FM =

Radio station in Santiago Juxtlahuaca, Oaxaca

Santiago Juxtlahuaca, Oaxaca; Mexico
- Frequency: 94.7 FM
- Branding: InspiraZion Radio

Programming
- Format: Christian

Ownership
- Owner: Rutilio Carlos Méndez Martínez

History
- First air date: December 14, 2016 (concession)
- Call sign meaning: Santiago JUXtlahuaca

Technical information
- Class: A
- ERP: 2.06 kW
- HAAT: -417.5 m
- Transmitter coordinates: 17°20′05.33″N 98°00′33.63″W

XHJUX-FM is a radio station on 94.7 FM in Santiago Juxtlahuaca, Oaxaca. It is known as InspiraZion Radio and broadcasts a Christian format.

== History ==
XHJUX was awarded its social concession on December 14, 2016, more than three years after the initial application was filed on April 8, 2013.
