= XHPEEN-FM =

Radio station in Sabinas, Coahuila

- Sabinas, Coahuila; Mexico
- Broadcast area: Sabinas, Coahuila
- Frequency: 102.3 MHz
- Branding: Espacio 102.3

Programming
- Format: Cultural

Ownership
- Owner: Radio Medios de Monclova; (Fundación de la Radio Cultural, A.C.)
- Sister stations: XHFRC-FM Monclova, XHPEDM-FM Cuatro Ciénegas, XHPEEI-FM Ciudad Acuña, XHPEAE-FM Ríoverde, SLP

History
- First air date: October 8, 2019
- Call sign meaning: (templated callsign)

Technical information
- Licensing authority: CRT
- Class: A
- ERP: 3 kW
- HAAT: 13.4 m (44 ft)
- Transmitter coordinates: 27°50′54″N 101°07′12″W

XHPEEN-FM is a noncommercial radio station on 102.3 FM in Sabinas, Coahuila. It is known as Espacio 102.3 and carries a cultural format.

== History ==
On June 10, 2013, Fundación de la Radio Cultural, A.C., applied for a new permit FM station at Sabinas. The application along with two others by FRC for new social stations in Coahuila was approved by the Federal Telecommunications Institute on November 28, 2018. XHPEEN-FM was the first of the four new Espacio stations to begin broadcasting, doing so on October 8, 2019.
