= XHESCC-FM =

Radio station in Sabinas, Coahuila

- Sabinas, Coahuila; Mexico
- Frequency: 97.7 MHz
- Branding: Like 97.7 FM

Programming
- Format: Pop

Ownership
- Owner: GRD Multimedia; (Radio Divertida XESC, S.A. de C.V.)
- Sister stations: XHBX-FM

History
- First air date: 1975
- Call sign meaning: derived from XESC-AM: Sabinas Coahuila (additional E and C added in AM-FM migration)

Technical information
- Licensing authority: CRT
- Class: B1
- ERP: 25 kW
- HAAT: −20.2 m (−66 ft)
- Transmitter coordinates: 27°52′40″N 101°08′30″W

Links
- Website: likefm.com.mx

XHESCC-FM is a radio station in Sabinas, Coahuila. Broadcasting on 97.7 FM, XHESCC is owned by GRD Multimedia and carries its Like FM pop format.

== History ==
XESC-AM 1250 came to air in 1975. It was a 1 kW daytime station owned by the successors of Roberto Boone Menchaca. In the 1980s, the station was transferred to its current concessionaire and began nighttime broadcasting with 500 watts.

XESC moved to FM in the early 2010s. Because the XHSC-FM (Guadalajara), XHESC-FM (Escárcega, Campeche) and XHSCC-FM (San Cristóbal de las Casas, Chiapas) callsigns were taken, XESC became XHESCC-FM with the added C for the state (Coahuila), as well as an E from the XE callsign for the AM station.
