= XHMS-FM =

Radio station in Monclova, Coahuila, Mexico

- Monclova, Coahuila; Mexico
- Frequency: 99.5 FM
- Branding: Super FM

Programming
- Format: Pop/adult contemporary

Ownership
- Owner: Radio Medios de Monclova; (Radio Medios de Monclova, S.A. de C.V.)
- Sister stations: XHFRC

History
- First air date: May 5, 1966
- Call sign meaning: Melchor Sánchez Dovalina (original concessionaire)

Technical information
- Licensing authority: CRT
- Class: A
- ERP: 1.907 kW
- HAAT: −43.9 m (−144 ft)

Links
- Webcast: Listen live
- Website: superfm.com.mx

XHMS-FM is a radio station on 99.5 FM in Monclova, Coahuila, Mexico. It is owned by Radio Medios de Monclova and carries a pop/adult contemporary format known as Super FM.

== History ==
XHMS, the first FM radio station in Coahuila, was approved to begin operations on December 8, 1965, received its concession on April 15, 1966, and signed on May 5 of that year. Named for founder Melchor Sánchez Dovalina, XHMS started on 99.3 MHz with a power of 250 watts, later increased to 310. In the 1980s, XHMS moved to 99.5 and increased its power to 1.9 kW.
