= XHETS-FM =

Radio station in Tapachula, Chiapas, Mexico

- Tapachula, Chiapas, Mexico; Mexico
- Frequency: 94.7 MHz
- Branding: Ke Buena

Programming
- Format: Grupera
- Affiliations: Radiópolis

Ownership
- Owner: Radio Núcleo; (Radio Tapachula, S.A.)

History
- First air date: January 8, 1942 (concession)

Technical information
- Class: B1
- ERP: 25 kW
- HAAT: 112.4 m
- Transmitter coordinates: 14°55′01.64″N 92°16′33″W

Links
- Website: tapachula.radionucleo.com/index.php/ke-buena-94-7-fm

XHETS-FM is a radio station on 94.7 FM in Tapachula, Chiapas, Mexico. It carries the Ke Buena grupera format from Radiópolis.

== History ==
The former XETS-AM is among the oldest radio stations in Chiapas. It received its concession in 1942 and originally operated on 630 kHz, later moving to 780 in the 1990s or early 2000s. It was approved for AM-FM migration in 2010.
