= Cloete =

Town in the Mexican state of Coahuila

Cloete or San José de Cloete is a coal-mining town in the municipality of Sabinas, in the Mexican state of Coahuila.

It was founded in the late 19th century by William Broderick Cloete, a British mine-owner. It adopted his name following his death in the sinking of RMS Lusitania in 1915.

In the 2005 INEGI Census it reported a population of 3,977.

== Data ==
27°55′26″N 101°10′45″W
Altitude: 360 m
Postal code: 26960
Area code: 861
