= XHPNS-FM =

Radio station in Piedras Negras, Coahuila, Mexico

- Piedras Negras, Coahuila; Mexico
- Frequency: 107.1 MHz
- Branding: Exa FM

Programming
- Format: Spanish and English Top 40 (CHR)
- Affiliations: MVS Radio

Ownership
- Owner: Grupo Zócalo; (Emisora del Norte, S.A. de C.V.)
- Sister stations: Super Canal 12, XHCDU-FM, XHTA-FM, XHIK-FM, XHVM-FM, XHPC-FM

History
- First air date: November 1, 1996
- Call sign meaning: "Piedras Negras"

Technical information
- Licensing authority: CRT
- Class: AA
- ERP: 6 kW
- HAAT: 64.4 m (211 ft)
- Transmitter coordinates: 28°41′12.67″N 100°33′03.45″W

Links
- Webcast: Listen live
- Website: Exa FM Piedras Negras Website

XHPNS-FM is a radio station on 107.1 FM in Piedras Negras, Coahuila, Mexico. It is owned by Grupo Zócalo and carries the Exa FM Top 40 (CHR) format from MVS Radio.

== History ==
XHPNS received its concession on November 30, 1994 and signed on November 1, 1996. It was initially owned by Luis Javier Núñez Vigil but has been under Zócalo control for its entire history.

On September 20, 2019, the station flipped from romantic "Amor 107" to Exa FM, bringing the format back to Piedras Negras after XHRE-FM came under Radiorama management.
