= XHVUC-FM =

Radio station in Villa Unión–Nava, Coahuila

- Nava, Coahuila; Mexico
- Broadcast area: Nava, Coahuila; Piedras Negras
- Frequency: 95.9 MHz
- Branding: Globo

Programming
- Format: Romantic
- Affiliations: MVS Radio

Ownership
- Owner: Grupo M; (Organización Radiofónica del Norte, S.A. de C.V.)
- Sister stations: XHVUN-FM

History
- First air date: December 13, 1976 (concession)
- Former call signs: XEVUC-AM
- Former frequencies: 1520 kHz, 1050 kHz
- Call sign meaning: Villa Unión, Coahuila

Technical information
- Licensing authority: CRT
- Class: B1
- ERP: 25 kW
- HAAT: 78.07 m (256.1 ft)
- Transmitter coordinates: 28°13′40.8″N 100°44′47.5″W

Links
- Webcast: Listen live (via TuneIn)
- Website: fmglobo.com/plaza/piedras-negras/

XHVUC-FM is a Mexican radio station on 95.9 FM in Nava, Coahuila. The station is owned by Grupo M, is affiliated with MVS Radio and carries the Globo romantic format.

== History ==
XEVUC-AM 1520 received its concession on December 13, 1976. It was owned by Maximiliano Eduardo Bravo Arenas and broadcast as a 1 kW daytimer. In 2002, the concession was transferred to Organización Radiofónica del Norte.

XEVUC moved from 1520 to 1050 kHz some time before migrating to FM as XHVUC-FM 95.9, but this change never appeared on any official list. It was previously known as La Gigante.

On October 1, 2021, XHVUC changed from a Christian talk format as Fe Activa to a romantic format, using the FM Globo brand from MVS Radio.
