= XHVUN-FM =

Radio station in Villa Unión–Nava, Coahuila

- Villa Unión/Nava, Coahuila; Mexico
- Broadcast area: Nava, Coahuila
- Frequency: 104.3 MHz
- Branding: La Consentida

Programming
- Format: Grupera

Ownership
- Owner: Grupo Martínez; (Organización Radiofónica del Norte, S.A. de C.V.)
- Sister stations: XHVUC-FM

History
- First air date: April 3, 1995 (concession)
- Call sign meaning: Villa UNión

Technical information
- Licensing authority: CRT
- Class: B
- ERP: 50 kW
- HAAT: 100.14 m (328.5 ft)
- Transmitter coordinates: 28°13′40.8″N 100°44′47.5″W

Links
- Website: grupomradio.mx

XHVUN-FM is a radio station on 104.3 FM in Nava, Coahuila. It is owned by Grupo Martínez and known as La Consentida with a grupera format.

== History ==
XHVUN received its concession on April 3, 1995.
