= Aldo Llanas =

Mexican footballer (born 2003)

Personal information
- Full name: Aldo Emmanuel Llanas Valdez
- Date of birth: 7 February 2003 (age 23)
- Place of birth: Monclova, Coahuila, Mexico
- Height: 1.68 m (5 ft 6 in)
- Position: Attacking midfielder

Team information
- Current team: Cadereyta
- Number: 4

Youth career
- 2018–2022: Toluca

Senior career*
Years	Team	Apps	(Gls)
2022–2024	Toluca	2	(0)
2025–	Cadereyta		
- * Club domestic league appearances and goals as of 14 August 2022

Aldo Emmanuel Llanas Valdez (born 7 February 2003) is a Mexican professional footballer who plays as an attacking midfielder for fourth-tier Liga TDP club Cadereyta.

== Career statistics ==
=== Club ===
As of 14 August 2022

Club	Season	League			Cup		Continental		Other		Total	
Club	Season	Division	Apps	Goals	Apps	Goals	Apps	Goals	Apps	Goals	Apps	Goals
Toluca	2022–23	Liga MX	2	0	—		—		—		2	0
Career total			2	0	0	0	0	0	0	0	2	0
