= XHRG-FM =

Radio station in Ciudad Acuña, Coahuila, Mexico

- Ciudad Acuña, Coahuila; Mexico
- Frequency: 95.5 FM
- Branding: La Mas Perra Acuña

Programming
- Format: Regional Mexican

Ownership
- Owner: RCG Media; (Roberto Casimiro González Treviño)
- Sister stations: XHPL-FM, XHHAC-FM XHKD-FM, XHRCG-FM

History
- First air date: April 22, 1980 (concession)
- Call sign meaning: Raúl R. González Lozano (original concessionaire)

Technical information
- Licensing authority: CRT
- Class: AA
- ERP: 3.52 kW
- HAAT: 52.9 m (174 ft)

Links
- Webcast: Listen live
- Website: rcgmedia.mx

XHRG-FM is a radio station in Ciudad Acuña, Coahuila, Mexico, broadcasting on 95.5 FM and carrying a regional Mexican format known as La Mas Perra. It is owned by the Ciudad Acuña branch of Saltillo-based Grupo RCG Media.

== History ==
The concession for the station was obtained in 1980, Between the years 2005-2015 XHRG having the station with Exa FM from MVS Radio, Between 2016 and 2022 years La Ley with grupera music and cumbia, In 2024 La Ley changed the name La Mas Perra adopted the station name and Regional Mexican music and cumbia old and now format.
