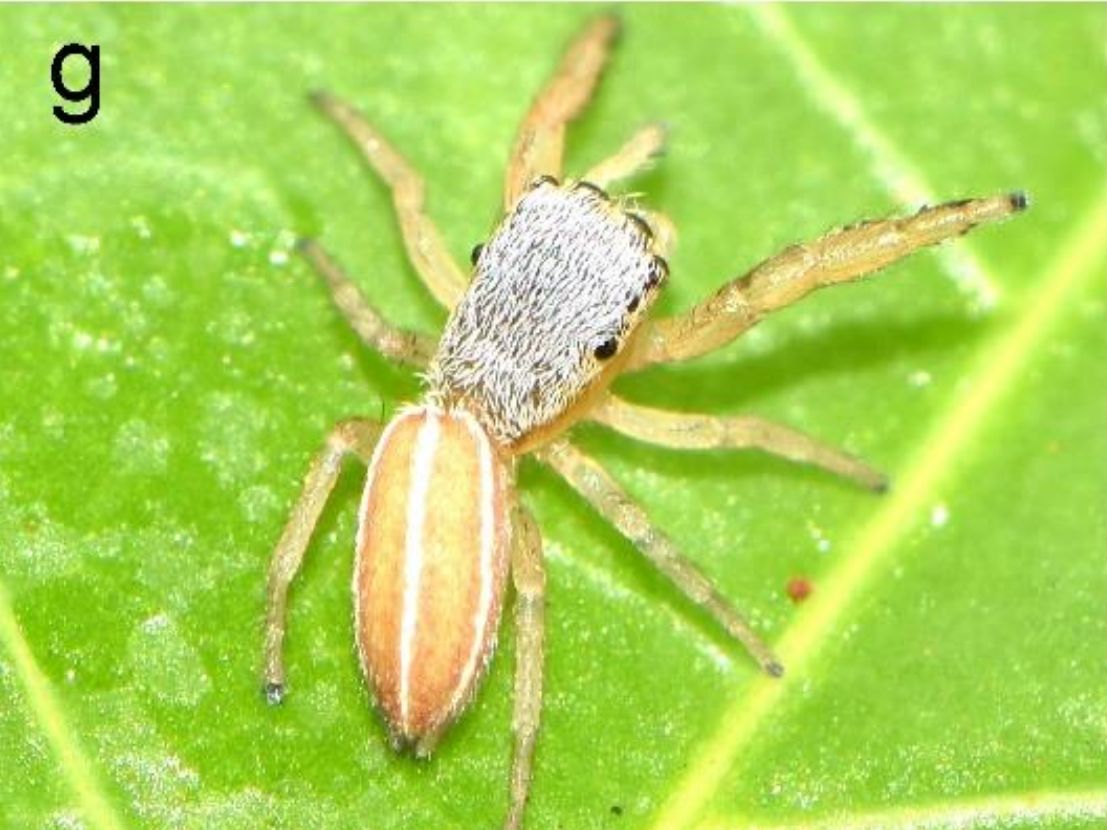
- female A. patoruzito
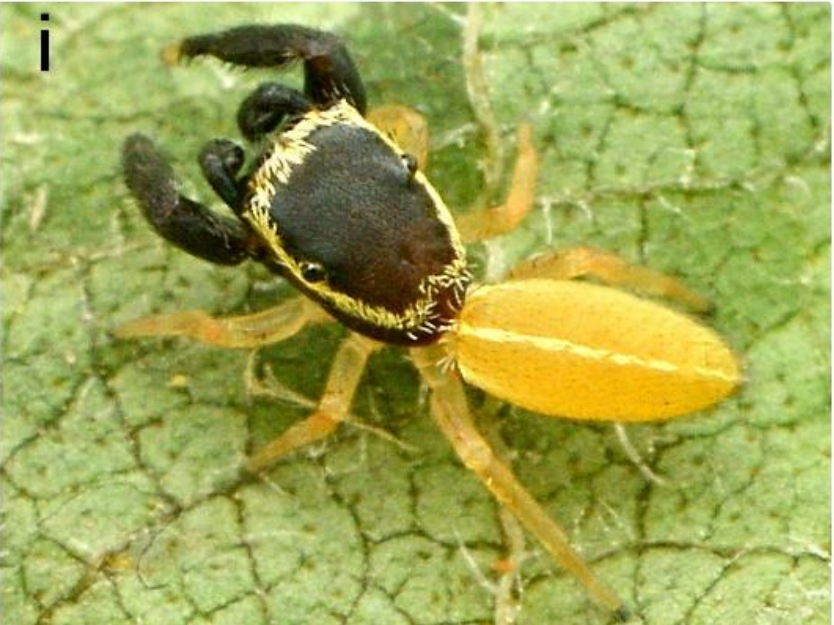
- male A. patoruzito

Scientific classification
- Kingdom: Animalia
- Phylum: Arthropoda
- Subphylum: Chelicerata
- Class: Arachnida
- Order: Araneae
- Infraorder: Araneomorphae
- Family: Salticidae
- Genus: Ahijuna; Rubio, Baigorria & Stolar, 2022
- Species: A. patoruzito

Binomial name
- Ahijuna patoruzito Rubio, Baigorria & Stolar, 2022

= Ahijuna =

Species of spider

Ahijuna is a monotypic genus of spiders in the family Salticidae containing the single species, Ahijuna patoruzito.

== Distribution ==
Ahijuna patoruzito is endemic to Argentina.

The species is apparently restricted to tall and well preserved humid grasslands, dominated by Sorghastrum Nash and Andropogon Linneo grasses.

== Etymology ==
According to the authors, "ahijuna" is an expression of astonishment or admiration by local rural people. The species is named after Argentinian cartoon character Patoruzito, with his black hair and white hairband resembling the male of this species.
