= XHPL-FM =

Radio station in Ciudad Acuña, Coahuila

- Ciudad Acuña, Coahuila; Mexico
- Frequency: 99.7 FM
- Branding: Globo

Programming
- Format: Spanish and english classic hits
- Affiliations: MVS Radio

Ownership
- Owner: XH Medios; (Radioblogs, S.A. de C.V.)
- Operator: RCG Media
- Sister stations: XHRG-FM, XHHAC-FM, XHKD-FM, XHRCG-FM

History
- First air date: June 4, 1970

Technical information
- Licensing authority: CRT
- Class: A
- ERP: 3 kW
- HAAT: 44 m (144 ft)
- Transmitter coordinates: 29°18′49″N 100°57′01.45″W

Links
- Website: fmglobo.com/ciudadacuna/

XHPL-FM is a radio station in Ciudad Acuña, Coahuila. Broadcasting on 99.7 FM, XHPL is known as Globo.

== History ==
Pedro Rodríguez Olivares applied for and received a concession to own an FM station in Acuña in 1970, initially operating on 98.5 MHz. It was eventually sold to Alfredo Garza Garza; upon his passing, his heir, Guillermo Garza Castillo, took over the station.

In 2019, the concession was transferred to Radioblogs, S.A. de C.V. The station was traditionally known as Radio Felicidad until affiliating with MVS.
