= XHMP-FM =

Radio station in Torreón, Coahuila, Mexico

- Torreón, Coahuila; Mexico
- Broadcast area: Comarca Lagunera
- Frequency: 95.5 FM
- Branding: Exa FM

Programming
- Format: CHR
- Affiliations: MVS Radio

Ownership
- Owner: GREM (Grupo Radio Estéreo Mayran); (Fermur Radio, S.A. de C.V.)
- Sister stations: XHTC-FM, XHPE-FM

History
- First air date: May 5, 1979 (concession)

Technical information
- Licensing authority: CRT
- Class: B
- ERP: 12 kW
- HAAT: 400.2 m (1,313 ft)
- Transmitter coordinates: 25°32′18″N 103°27′37″W

Links
- Website: www.exa.gremradio.com.mx

XHMP-FM is a radio station on 95.5 FM in Torreón, Coahuila. The station is owned by GREM and carries the Exa FM format from MVS Radio.

== History ==
XHMP received its concession on May 5, 1979. It was owned by Braulio Manuel Fernández Aguirre, a former senator, two-time federal deputy and mayor of Torreón. The station aired a pop format and was known as Estelar 95, changing to 95-5 Sentidos in the early 2000s before becoming an Exa FM station in April 2009. In April 2017, following Fernández Aguirre's 2016 death, the station concession transferred to his widow, María Cristina Murra Talamás, and then to a corporation.
