= WDEC-FM =

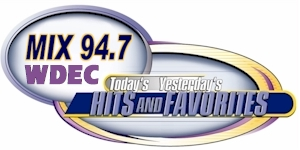
- Americus, Georgia; United States
- Frequency: 94.7 MHz
- Branding: Mix 94.7

Programming
- Format: Hot adult contemporary
- Affiliations: ABC Radio; NBC News Radio; Motor Racing Network

Ownership
- Owner: Sumter Broadcasting Co., Inc.
- Sister stations: WISK-FM

History
- First air date: September 12, 1964 (at 94.3)
- Former call signs: WDEC-FM (1964–1972); WIPE (1972–1981); WADZ (1981–1988)
- Former frequencies: 94.3 MHz (1964–1996)

Technical information
- Licensing authority: FCC
- Facility ID: 63786
- Class: C3
- ERP: 25,000 watts
- HAAT: 100 meters
- Transmitter coordinates: 31°53′52.00″N 84°18′53.00″W

Links
- Public license information: Public file; LMS
- Webcast: Listen Live
- Website: americusradio.com

WDEC-FM (94.7 FM) is a radio station broadcasting a hot adult contemporary format. It is licensed to Americus, Georgia, United States. The station is owned by Sumter Broadcasting Co., Inc. and features programming from ABC Radio, NBC News Radio, and Motor Racing Network. The station also broadcasts men's basketball games for Georgia Southwestern State University. In 1995, the station changed from the 3 kW, 94.3 FM frequency to the more powerful 94.7 frequency.

== History ==
The station went on the air as WDEC-FM at 94.3 MHz on September 12, 1964. In 1972 the station changed its call sign to WIPE. On February 20, 1981, the station changed its call sign to WADZ. On February 15, 1988, the station changed its call sign to the current WDEC-FM. While owned by Guest-Mattox Broadcasting, it shared call letters with WDEC-AM 1290, which was an oldies radio format for many years before going off the air in 1994 following flooding caused by Tropical Storm Alberto. In late 1994, the station was sold to Sumter Broadcasting Co.
