= XHPE-FM =

Radio station in Torreón, Coahuila

- Torreón, Coahuila; Mexico
- Broadcast area: Comarca Lagunera
- Frequency: 97.1 FM
- Branding: La Mejor/Estéreo Gallito

Programming
- Format: Grupera
- Affiliations: MVS Radio

Ownership
- Owner: GREM (Grupo Radio Estéreo Mayran); (D.L.R. Radio, S.A. de C.V.)
- Sister stations: XHTC-FM, XHMP-FM

History
- First air date: December 15, 1975

Technical information
- Licensing authority: CRT
- Class: C1
- ERP: 20 kW
- HAAT: 400.2 m (1,313 ft)
- Transmitter coordinates: 25°32′18″N 103°27′37″W

Links
- Website: www.lamejor.gremradio.com.mx

XHPE-FM is a radio station on 97.1 FM in Torreón, Coahuila. The station is owned by GREM and carries the La Mejor format from MVS Radio.

== History ==
XHPE received its concession on December 8, 1975 and formally signed on a week later. It was owned by Alonso Gómez Aguirre and was the first FM radio station in the Laguna region.

The concessionaire name, D.L.R. Radio, refers to Luis de la Rosa, one of the owners of GREM.
