= XHPNW-TDT =

Independent TV station in Piedras Negras, Coahuila

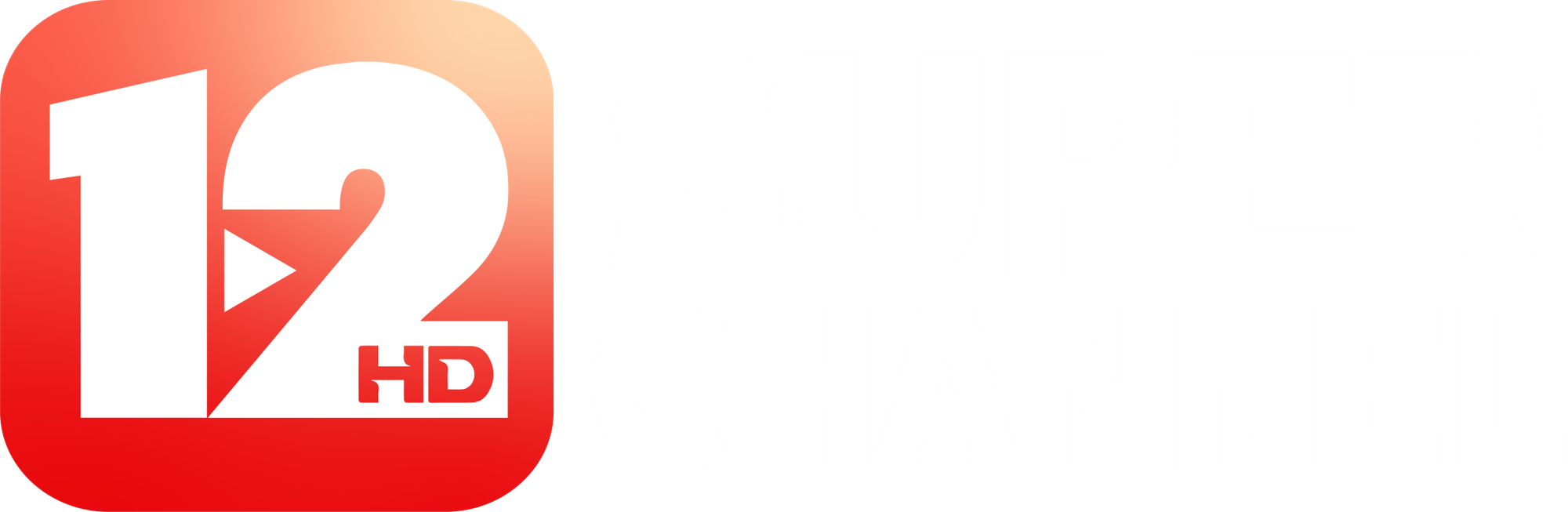
- Piedras Negras, Coahuila; Mexico
- Channels: Digital: 39/33 (UHF); Virtual: 12
- Branding: Super Channel 12

Programming
- Subchannels: 12.1 XHPNW; 12.2 XHPNW -2 hours
- Affiliations: Independent; Multimedios Televisión

Ownership
- Owner: Grupo Zócalo; (XHFJS-TV, S.A. de C.V.)
- Sister stations: XHTA-FM, XHIK-FM, XHVM-FM, XHPNS-FM, XHPC-FM

History
- Founded: 1996
- Former channel numbers: 22 (analog and digital virtual, 1994-2016)
- Call sign meaning: Piedras Negras, with a W for Coahuila

Technical information
- Licensing authority: CRT
- ERP: 15 kW
- HAAT: 16.9 m (55 ft)
- Transmitter coordinates: 28°41′11″N 100°33′01″W

Links
- Website: Super Channel 12

XHPNW-TDT is an independent television station in Piedras Negras, Coahuila, owned and operated by Grupo Zócalo.

== History ==
XHPNW received its concession on October 31, 1994, after Televisora Nacional, S.A. de C.V. was selected from among four bidders to operate the station. Televisora Nacional was owned by Arnoldo Cabada de la O, who owned TV stations in Ciudad Juárez and Mexicali. For most of its history after signing on in 1996, the station relayed the Azteca 7 network, which did not have a transmitter in Piedras Negras. However, in 2010, the station split from the network and began operation as a local independent under Súper Medios de Coahuila.

As a result of the station being sold to Grupo Zócalo, which owns the newspaper of the same name in Saltillo and five FM radio stations in Piedras Negras, the station relaunched on August 24, 2015, signing on its digital station (RF channel 39) and beginning local programs in HD. XHPNW's newscasts, previously titled Súper Medios Noticias, became TeleZócalo. The station also added some programming from Multimedios Televisión. In 2016, XHPNW changed its channel number to 12, which was assigned by the Federal Telecommunications Institute due to its affiliation with Multimedios. However, XHPNW retained 12 when the rest of Multimedios moved to channel 6.

The concessionaire, XHFJS-TV, S.A. de C.V., is named for Francisco Juaristi Santos, the owner of Grupo Zócalo.

XHPNW shut off its analog signal on December 16, 2015, along with other Piedras Negras stations.

== Repeaters ==
XHPNW operates four 500-watt repeaters that carry its signal to the Cinco Manantiales region, at Allende, Nava, Villa Unión and Zaragoza. These stations broadcast on channel 33, where XHPNW will be moved following repacking. The authorization to move the main station was approved by the IFT on March 7, 2018.
