= XHTA-FM =

Radio station in Piedras Negras, Coahuila

- Piedras Negras, Coahuila; Mexico
- Broadcast area: Piedras Negras
- Frequency: 94.5 FM
- Branding: Dinámica 94.5 FM

Programming
- Format: Latin urban and Contemporary hit radio

Ownership
- Owner: Radio Zócalo; (XHTA, S.A. de C.V.)
- Sister stations: Super Canal 12, XHCDU-FM XHVM-FM, XHIK-FM, XHPNS-FM, XHPC-FM

History
- First air date: October 15, 1970

Technical information
- Licensing authority: CRT
- Class: A
- ERP: 3 kW
- HAAT: 55.02 m (180.5 ft)

Links
- Webcast: Listen live
- Website: radiozocalo.com.mx

XHTA-FM (branded as Dinámica 94.5 FM) is a Latin urban and Contemporary hit radio formatted FM radio station, broadcasting on 94.5 MHz FM in Piedras Negras, Coahuila, Mexico.

== History ==
XHTA received its concession on October 15, 1970. It was owned by Tomás García Jiménez, who founded Señales de Oro ("Golden Signals"), a radio system that grew to five stations in northern Coahuila; he also owned a flower shop, funeral parlor and furniture store.
