= CFAO-FM =

Former radio station in Alliston, Ontario

- Alliston, Ontario; Canada
- Frequency: 94.7 MHz

Programming
- Format: Adult contemporary

Ownership
- Owner: Frank Rogers; (2188301 Ontario Corporation)

History
- First air date: 2009
- Last air date: 2010
- Call sign meaning: Alliston, Ontario

CFAO-FM was a radio station that operated at 94.7 FM in Alliston, Ontario, Canada. The station broadcast an adult contemporary format.

Owned by Frank Rogers, on behalf of a corporation to be incorporated the station was licensed on July 28, 2008.

== History ==
In 2008, Rogers was licensed to operate a second radio station at Beeton with the callsign CJBT-FM. Not yet on the air, that station had until August 1, 2012, to launch, or face the cancellation of the license.

In 2009, CFAO began on-air testing. It is uncertain when the station officially launched.

As of June 25, 2010, CFAO has been shut down due to economic troubles, which led to the station's eviction from its rented studios; also during these final days of operation, the station was unable to pay wages to its staffers.

In 2013, Rogers sought renewal of CFAO's license; however, on December 19, 2014, the CRTC denied the station's renewal, citing many violations, including remaining dark since 2011, and failing to meet numerous target dates to resume broadcasting - the most recent being April 1, 2014. An intervention report from My Broadcasting Corporation, owner of competing station CIMA-FM, cited that CFAO was only on the air for 11 months at most.
