= WAAW =

Coordinates: 33.509°N 81.624°W

- Williston, South Carolina; United States
- Broadcast area: Augusta metropolitan area
- Frequency: 94.7 MHz
- Branding: Shout 94.7

Programming
- Format: Gospel music

Ownership
- Owner: Dr. Frank Neely; (Wisdom, Inc.)

History
- First air date: 1995

Technical information
- Licensing authority: FCC
- Facility ID: 4094
- Class: A
- ERP: 2,550 watts
- HAAT: 155 meters (509 ft)

Links
- Public license information: Public file; LMS

WAAW (94.7 FM) is a commercial radio station licensed to Williston, South Carolina, and serving the Augusta metropolitan area. The station carries a gospel music format. It uses the moniker "Shout 94.7". It is owned by Wisdom, Inc., led by Dr. Frank Neely. The radio studios and offices are on Park Avenue SE in Aiken, South Carolina.

WAAW has an effective radiated power (ERP) of 2,550 watts. The transmitter is on Perry Street at Old Barnwell Road in Montmorenci, South Carolina.

== History ==
WAAW signed on the air in late 1995 with a classic R&B format as "94.7 The Boss". It was owned by legendary soul music singer James Brown (a native of the area) under his company Brown Family Broadcasting.

Brown sold the station in 2002 and the format was changed to urban gospel.

On June 8, 2023, due to owner Dr. Frank Neely's retirement, it was announced that it would drop the urban gospel format on July 3, resulting in a format change to sports talk, and become an affiliate of Fox Sports Radio. In addition to the change, it was also announced that an unknown radio company would operate the station though a LMA agreement. The LMA agreement was finally confirmed on June 28, when Gray Radio LLC (a company which is not related to Gray Television, owner of CBS affiliate WRDW-TV, channel 12, and NBC affiliate WAGT-CD, channel 26), announced that it would partner with the station to officially launch "Fox Sports 94.7 FM Augusta". Coinciding with the change, it was announced that WAAW would become the new home for the Masters.

On May 7, 2025, WAAW changed their format from sports to gospel, branded as "Shout 94.7".
