= XHVM-FM =

Radio station in Piedras Negras, Coahuila, Mexico

- Piedras Negras, Coahuila; Mexico
- Frequency: 100.9 MHz
- Branding: Back FM

Programming
- Format: Oldies

Ownership
- Owner: Grupo Zócalo; (Emisora del Norte, S.A. de C.V.)
- Sister stations: Super Canal 12, XHCDU-FM, XHTA-FM, XHIK-FM , XHPC-FM, XHPNS-FM

History
- First air date: July 24, 1969 (concession)

Technical information
- Licensing authority: CRT
- Class: A
- ERP: 3 kW
- HAAT: 57.78 m (189.6 ft)
- Transmitter coordinates: 28°41′12.67″N 100°33′03.45″W

Links
- Webcast: Listen live
- Website: https://radiozocalo.com.mx

XHVM-FM is a radio station on 100.9 FM in Piedras Negras, Coahuila, Mexico. It is owned by Grupo Zócalo and carries a retro format known as Back FM.

== History ==
XHVM began as XEVM-AM 1240, receiving its concession on July 24, 1969. It moved to FM in 2011.
