= WULK =

Coordinates: 33°30′54″N 82°55′18″W

- Crawfordville, Georgia; United States
- Frequency: 94.7 MHz
- Branding: Lake Country

Programming
- Format: Country music

Ownership
- Owner: Paul and Suzanne Stone; (Wyche Services Corporation)

Technical information
- Licensing authority: FCC
- Facility ID: 183349
- Class: A
- ERP: 3,800 watts
- HAAT: 128 meters (420 ft)

Links
- Public license information: Public file; LMS

WULK 94.7 FM is a radio station licensed to Crawfordville, Georgia. The station broadcasts a country music format and is owned by Paul and Suzanne Stone's Southern Broadcasting, through licensee Wyche Services Corporation.
