= XHINS-FM =

Radio station at the Instituto Tecnológico de Saltillo in Saltillo, Coahuila

- Saltillo, Coahuila; Mexico
- Frequency: 100.1 FM
- Branding: Radio Tec

Programming
- Format: Cultural

Ownership
- Owner: Instituto Tecnológico de Saltillo

History
- First air date: September 14, 1991
- Last air date: 2003
- Call sign meaning: First three letters of "Instituto"

Technical information
- ERP: 3 kW
- Transmitter coordinates: 25°26′28.7″N 100°59′31.5″W

Links
- Website: archived website

XHINS-FM was a radio station on 100.1 FM in Saltillo, Coahuila. The station is owned by the Instituto Tecnológico de Saltillo and is known as Radio Tec. Its permit expired in 2003, but the station remained on the air.

== History ==
XHINS came to air on September 14, 1991, at noon. Manuel Flores Revuelta, the rector of the technological school, had considered a radio station in his first term as rector from 1983 to 1986; when he became rector again in 1991, work began to build the station. The permit expired in 2003, but it remained on the air for two decades until ceasing operations.
