= XHEMF-FM =

Radio station in Monclova, Coahuila

- Monclova, Coahuila; Mexico
- Broadcast area: Monclova, Coahuila
- Frequency: 96.3 MHz
- Branding: La Mejor

Programming
- Format: Regional Mexican
- Affiliations: MVS Radio

Ownership
- Owner: Núcleo Radio y Televisión; (Radiodifusora de Monclova, S.A.)
- Sister stations: XHWGR-FM

History
- First air date: November 11, 1964 (concession)
- Former call signs: XEQX-AM, XEMF-AM
- Former frequencies: 970 kHz

Technical information
- Licensing authority: CRT
- Class: B1
- ERP: 10 kW
- HAAT: 54.02 m (177.2 ft)
- Transmitter coordinates: 26°50′44″N 101°24′36.1″W

Links
- Website: La Mejor website

XHEMF-FM is a radio station on 96.3 FM in Monclova, Coahuila. It carries the La Mejor regional mexican format from MVS Radio.

== History ==
XEQX-AM 970 received its concession on November 11, 1964. Owned then as now by Radiodifusora de Monclova, S.A., XEQX broadcast with 500 watts day and 150 watts night.

In the 1990s, the station took on the XEMF-AM callsign as the station that had it was rechristened XEWGR-AM.

In 2011, XEMF was authorized to move to FM from a facility on Cerro La Gloria in Monclova.
