= XHPEEI-FM =

Radio station in Ciudad Acuña, Coahuila

- Ciudad Acuña, Coahuila; Mexico
- Broadcast area: Ciudad Acuña, Coahuila
- Frequency: 97.1 MHz
- Branding: Espacio 97.1

Programming
- Format: Cultural

Ownership
- Owner: Radio Medios de Coahuila; (Fundación de la Radio Cultural, A.C.)
- Sister stations: XHFRC-FM Monclova, XHPEDM-FM Cuatro Ciénegas, XHPEEN-FM Sabinas, XHPEAE-FM Ríoverde, SLP

History
- First air date: October 18, 2019
- Call sign meaning: (templated callsign)

Technical information
- Licensing authority: CRT
- Class: A
- ERP: 3,000 kW
- HAAT: 18 m (59 ft)
- Transmitter coordinates: 29°19′27″N 100°55′54″W

XHPEEI-FM is a noncommercial radio station on 97.1 FM in Ciudad Acuña, Coahuila. It is known as Espacio 97.1 and carries a cultural format.

== History ==
On June 10, 2013, Fundación de la Radio Cultural, A.C., applied for a new permit FM station at Ciudad Acuña. The application along with two others by FRC for new social stations in Coahuila was approved by the Federal Telecommunications Institute on November 28, 2018. XHPEEI-FM was the second of the four new Espacio stations to begin broadcasting, doing so on October 18, 2019.
