= XHZCN-FM =

Radio station in Saltillo, Coahuila

- Saltillo, Coahuila; Mexico
- Frequency: 106.5 FM
- Branding: Digital 106.5

Programming
- Format: Pop

Ownership
- Owner: Grupo RCG; (TVRestringida del Norte, S.A. de C.V.)
- Sister stations: XHSJ-FM, XHSAC-FM XHRCG-TDT

History
- First air date: June 5, 1990 (concession)
- Call sign meaning: Zacatecas CoNcepción del Oro, original authorized location

Technical information
- Licensing authority: CRT
- Class: B1
- ERP: 10 kW
- HAAT: −117.61 m (−385.9 ft)
- Transmitter coordinates: 25°24′28.57″N 101°00′20.55″W

Links
- Webcast: Listen live
- Website: rcgmedia.mx

XHZCN-FM is a radio station on 106.5 FM in Saltillo, Coahuila, Mexico. The station is owned by Grupo RCG and carries a pop format known as Digital 106.5.

== History ==
XHZCN received its first concession on June 5, 1990. It was located originally at Concepción del Oro, Zacatecas and owned by Juan Francisco Águilar González. It promptly moved to Saltillo and was sold to Grupo ACIR under Radio XHZCN, S.A. de C.V. in 1997. While owned by ACIR, the station carried its La Comadre grupera format. XHZCN then passed through several different owners, including Radiorama and Voler, S.A. de C.V. (Capital Media), before eventually being acquired by Grupo RCG and carrying a pop format.
