= XHSJ-FM =

Radio station in Saltillo, Coahuila

XHSJ-FM/XESAME-AM
- Saltillo, Coahuila; Mexico
- Frequency: 103.3 FM/930 AM
- Branding: SJ 103.3 FM

Programming
- Format: Regional Mexican

Ownership
- Owner: Grupo RCG; (Herciana Frecuencia, S.A. de C.V.)
- Sister stations: XHZCN-FM, XHSAC-FM, XHRCG-TDT

History
- First air date: 1943

Technical information
- Licensing authority: CRT
- Class: B (FM); C (AM)
- Power: AM: 1,000 watts
- ERP: FM: 25 kW
- HAAT: −117.66 m (−386.0 ft)
- Transmitter coordinates: 25°24′28.57″N 101°00′20.55″W

Links
- Webcast: Listen live
- Website: rcgmedia.mx

XHSJ-FM/XESAME-AM is a radio station on 103.3 FM and 930 AM in Saltillo, Coahuila, Mexico. It is owned by Grupo RCG, which also owns other radio and television stations and cable systems in the area.

== History ==
XESJ-AM received its concession on February 3, 1943. It was owned by Radio Saltillo, S.A. and broadcast on 1250 kHz. It operated with 1,000 watts during the day and 500 at night, with daytime operations being raised to 5,000 watts in the early 2000s.

XESJ moved to FM in 2012 as XHSJ-FM. The concessionaire changed from Radiocomunicación de Saltillo to Herciana Frecuencia in 2013.
