= XHTC-FM =

Radio station in Torreón, Coahuila, Mexico

- Torreón, Coahuila; Mexico
- Broadcast area: Comarca Lagunera
- Frequency: 91.1 FM
- Branding: Globo

Programming
- Format: Spanish adult contemporary
- Affiliations: MVS Radio

Ownership
- Owner: GREM (Grupo Radio Estéreo Mayran); (Radio Mayran, S.A. de C.V.)
- Sister stations: XHMP-FM, XHPE-FM

History
- First air date: April 21, 1961 (concession)
- Call sign meaning: Torreón, Coahuila

Technical information
- Licensing authority: CRT
- Class: B1
- ERP: 25 kW
- HAAT: 29.43 m (96.6 ft)
- Transmitter coordinates: 25°32′18″N 103°27′37″W

Links
- Webcast: Listen live
- Website: fmglobo.com

XHTC-FM is a Mexican radio station on 91.1 FM in Torreón, Coahuila, Mexico. The station is owned by GREM, is affiliated with MVS Radio and carries the Globo Spanish adult contemporary format.

== History ==
XHTC began in 1961 as XETC-AM 1240, owned by Alonso Gómez Aguirre. The station was sold to the Mayran group in 1972, and in 1991 it moved from 1240 kHz to 880.

In 2011 XETC migrated to FM as XHTC-FM 91.1. On December 6, 2024, XHTC dropped its longtime local branding of Kiuu and adopted the Globo brand of MVS Radio.
