= XHRCG-FM =

Radio station in Ciudad Acuña, Coahuila

- Ciudad Acuña, Coahuila; Mexico
- Frequency: 105.1 FM
- Branding: RCG Radio

Programming
- Format: Regional Mexican
- Affiliations: Grupo Radiorama

Ownership
- Owner: RCG Media; (Elida Treviño González)
- Sister stations: XHRG-FM, XHPL-FM, XHHAC-FM, XHKD-FM

History
- Former call signs: XEAE-AM (1959-2012), XERCG-AM (2012-2014)
- Former frequencies: 1600 AM
- Call sign meaning: Roberto Casimiro González

Technical information
- ERP: 6 kW

Links
- Webcast: Listen live
- Website: RCG Radio website

XHRCG-FM is a radio station in Ciudad Acuña, Coahuila, Mexico broadcasting on 105.1 FM and carrying a Regional Mexican format known as RCG Radio. It is owned by Saltillo-based Grupo RCG; the group's two Ciudad Acuña radio stations, XHRCG and XHRG-FM 95.5 are operated by RCommunications. The US company is owned by Roberto G. González, the son of Roberto Casimiro González, founder of Grupo RCG.

== History ==
Logo as La Banda de la 105.1 FM

The concession for the station was obtained in March 1959 for XEAE-AM 1600, changing calls to XERCG-AM in the 1990s. The station migrated to FM late in the 2000s.

At one point in the early 2010s, R Communications operated XHRCG from Del Rio, Texas as D-Rock, a rock music format, In 2016 and 2021 La Banda de la 105.1 brand carries with grupera music and banda, In 2022 La Banda de la 105.1 changed the RCG Radio 105.1 with Regional Mexican music adopted.
