= XHSAC-FM =

Radio station in Saltillo, Coahuila, Mexico

- Saltillo, Coahuila; Mexico
- Frequency: 99.3 MHz
- Branding: Somos 99.3

Programming
- Format: Classic hits

Ownership
- Owner: Grupo Radiorama; (XESAC-AM, S.A. de C.V.)
- Operator: Grupo RCG
- Sister stations: XHSJ-FM, XHZCN-FM XHRCG-TDT

History
- First air date: June 15, 1992 (concession)
- Call sign meaning: "Saltillo, Coahuila"

Technical information
- Licensing authority: CRT
- Class: B1
- ERP: 25 kWs
- HAAT: −107.53 m (−352.8 ft)
- Transmitter coordinates: 25°22′33″N 100°59′45″W

Links
- Webcast: Listen live
- Website: rcgmedia.mx

XHSAC-FM is a radio station on 99.3 FM in Saltillo, Coahuila, Mexico. The station carries Somos 99.3 Classic hits format of its operator, Grupo RCG.

== History ==
Logo as Radio Recuerdo used 2018-19

XESAC-AM on 1080 kHz received its concession on June 15, 1992. The 1 kW daytimer was owned by Radio Celebridad, S.A., a subsidiary of Radiorama, and it soon moved to 610 kHz in order to broadcast with 900 watts night.

XESAC received approval to migrate to FM in 2011. In 2018, it changed from Milenio Radio to Radio Recuerdo; in February 2019, it ditched that format to go grupera as La Caliente. Multimedios ceased operating XHSAC and XHSHT-FM 102.5 on August 1, 2020; they were then leased to Grupo RCG until the end of 2021, dropping the "La Líder" moniker it had been using and eventually taking the Fiesta Mexicana Regional Mexican brand. RCG resumed operating the station in September 2022 ahead of the launch of a new brand, "La Más Perra".
