= XHPC-FM =

Radio station in Piedras Negras, Coahuila

- Piedras Negras, Coahuila; Mexico
- Frequency: 107.9 MHz
- Branding: Súper Estelar

Programming
- Format: Grupera

Ownership
- Owner: Grupo Zócalo; (Radio Zócalo, S.A. de C.V.)
- Sister stations: Super Canal 12, XHCDU-FM, XHTA-FM, XHIK-FM , XHVM-FM, XHPNS-FM

History
- First air date: April 18, 1986 (concession)
- Call sign meaning: Piedras Negras Coahuila this abbreviation using references the personal computer.

Technical information
- Licensing authority: CRT
- Class: B1
- ERP: 10 kW
- HAAT: −4.4 m (−14 ft)

Links
- Webcast: Listen live
- Website: https://radiozocalo.com.mx/estaciones

XHPC-FM is a radio station on 107.9 FM in Piedras Negras, Coahuila. It is owned by Grupo Zócalo and carries a grupera format known as Súper Estelar.

== History ==
XHPC received its concession on April 18, 1986. It was owned by Francisco Antonio González Sánchez, the president of Grupo Multimedios.

Multimedios sold the station to Zócalo in 1999.
