= CJDS-FM =

Radio station in Saint-Pamphile, Quebec

Coordinates: 46.961°N 69.778°W

- Saint-Pamphile, Quebec; Canada
- Frequency: 94.7 MHz

Programming
- Language: French
- Format: Community radio

Ownership
- Owner: 3819914 Canada Inc.

History
- First air date: 2001

CJDS-FM is a community radio station that operates at 94.7 FM in Saint-Pamphile, Quebec, Canada.

Owned by Radio FM 200, the station received CRTC approval in 2001.
