= KYTF-LP =

- Blair, Nebraska; United States
- Frequency: 94.7 MHz
- Branding: FM 94.7 Blair Radio

Programming
- Format: Community radio

Ownership
- Owner: Blair Healing Rooms Inc

Technical information
- Licensing authority: FCC
- Facility ID: 196817
- ERP: 12 watts
- HAAT: 87 metres (285 ft)
- Transmitter coordinates: 41°31′16.9″N 96°08′29″W

Links
- Public license information: LMS
- Webcast: Listen live
- Website: www.blairradio.com

KYTF-LP (94.7 FM, "FM 94.7 Blair Radio") is a radio station licensed to serve the community of Blair, Nebraska. The station is owned by Blair Healing Rooms Inc and airs a community radio format.

The station was assigned the KYTF-LP call letters by the Federal Communications Commission on March 17, 2015.
