= XHIK-FM =

Radio station in Piedras Negras, Coahuila

- Piedras Negras, Coahuila; Mexico
- Frequency: 96.7 MHz
- Branding: La santa 96.7 FM

Programming
- Format: Grupera retro

Ownership
- Owner: Grupo Zócalo; (XEIK, S.A. de C.V.)
- Sister stations: Super Channel 12, XHCDU-FM, XHTA-FM, XHVM-FM, XHPC-FM, XHPNS-FM

History
- First air date: June 30, 1978 (concession)

Technical information
- Licensing authority: CRT
- Class: A
- ERP: 3 kW
- HAAT: 53.2 m (175 ft)
- Transmitter coordinates: 28°41′12.67″N 100°33′03.45″W

Links
- Webcast: Listen live
- Website: radiozocalo.com.mx

XHIK-FM is a radio station on 96.7 FM in Piedras Negras, Coahuila. It is owned by Grupo Zócalo and carries a grupera retro format known as La santa 96.7.

== History ==
XHIK began as XEIK-AM 1360, receiving its concession on June 30, 1978. It was owned by León Michel Vega. XEIK would later move to 830 kHz.

Previous logo

It moved to FM in 2011 and changed formats to romantic as Recuerdo 96.7 in April 2016, In 2020 Recuerdo changes the name La Santa 96.7 FM with grupera retro format into the 90s and 2000s years.
