= XHHAC-FM =

Radio station in Ciudad Acuña, Coahuila

- Ciudad Acuña, Coahuila; Mexico
- Frequency: 100.7 MHz
- Branding: La Mejor FM

Programming
- Format: Regional Mexican
- Affiliations: MVS Radio

Ownership
- Owner: XH Medios; (La Grande de Coahuila, S.A. de C.V.)
- Operator: RCG Media
- Sister stations: XHRG-FM, XHPL-FM, XHKD-FM, XHRCG-FM

History
- First air date: November 17, 1988 (concession)
- Call sign meaning: XHH Ciudad ACuña

Technical information
- Licensing authority: CRT
- Facility ID: 94929
- Class: A
- ERP: 6,000 watts
- HAAT: 54.91 meters (180.2 ft)

Links
- Webcast: Listen live
- Website: rcgmedia.mx/radio/la-mejor-100-7-fm

XHHAC-FM is a radio station on 100.7 FM in Ciudad Acuña, Coahuila. The station carries the La Mejor FM grupera format from MVS Radio.

== History ==
XHHAC received its concession on November 17, 1988. It was owned by Ricardo Espejo Munguía and later sold to Grupo RCG. In 2010, the station was sold to Grupo Radio Grande, a new radio group; the owner is now known as XH Medios.

At some point, XHHAC flipped from one grupera format to another, dropping Televisa Radio's Ke Buena for La Mejor from MVS Radio.
