= Coahuila Radio =

Public radio network in Mexico

- Coahuila; Mexico
- Frequency: (see table)

Programming
- Format: Public radio

Ownership
- Owner: Coahuila Radio y Televisión; (Government of the State of Coahuila)

History
- First air date: March 26, 2001

Technical information
- Licensing authority: CRT
- Class: (see table)
- ERP: (see table)
- HAAT: (see table)
- Transmitter coordinates: 25°23′23.48″N 100°59′54.71″W

Links
- Website: radiocoahuila.com.mx

Coahuila Radio is the state radio network of the Mexican state of Coahuila, broadcasting on 16 transmitters in the state. Radio Coahuila's studios are located in the capital city of Saltillo, in a state office building on Periférico Luis Echeverría, alongside the Saltillo transmitter.

== History ==
The state received the permits for the 16 stations on November 29, 2000. XHSOC in Saltillo began transmitting on March 26, 2001; the signal is fed to the other transmitters by satellite. The network has gone through several different names; at one point, it was known as Radio Gente.

The state network was constituted as a separate government agency on February 28, 2014. On March 8, 2019, by decree, the name of the agency was changed from Radio Coahuila to Coahuila Radio y Televisión in anticipation of the construction and launch of XHPBSA-TDT 17 in Saltillo.

== Transmitters ==
16 transmitters provide Coahuila Radio service to the state's populated areas. Most of the network's transmitters are located at state-run technical and secondary schools, with the notable exceptions of Parras de la Fuente, Saltillo and Torreón.

Callsign	FM Frequency	City	Class	ERP	HAAT
XHBTC-FM	94.3	Minas de Barroterán	A	.1 kW	38.26 m (125.5 ft)
XHELA-FM	99.9	Candela	A	.1 kW	−141.89 m (−465.5 ft)
XHCST-FM	102.3	Castaños	A	.1 kW	−126.46 m (−414.9 ft)
XHGEC-FM	102.3	Ciudad Acuña	A	3 kW	0.87 m (2 ft 10 in)
XHGAS-FM	102.7	Cuatro Ciénegas	A	.1 kW	−206.2 m (−677 ft)
XHONT-FM	93.9	Frontera	A	3 kW	−33.86 m (−111.1 ft)
XHUIZ-FM	102.9	Melchor Múzquiz	A	1 kW	−100 m (−330 ft)
XHNRC-FM	93.1	Nueva Rosita	A	3 kW	36.24 m (118.9 ft)
XHMPO-FM	101.1	Ocampo	A	.1 kW	−86.7 m (−284 ft)
XHPCH-FM	103.5	Parras de la Fuente	A	.1 kW	−86.7 m (−284 ft)
XHNPC-FM	102.5	Piedras Negras	A	1 kW	44.35 m (145.5 ft)
XHSOC-FM	89.7	Saltillo	A	2.969 kW	−124.88 m (−409.7 ft) HAAT
XHDRO-FM	91.5	San Pedro	A	.1 kW	27.2 m (89 ft)
XHSMC-FM	102.3	Sierra Mojada	A	.1 kW	−155.9 m (−511 ft)
XHEON-FM	97.9	Torreón	A	3 kW	8.2 m (27 ft)
XHOZA-FM	98.7	Zaragoza, Coahuila	A	3 kW	32.95 m (108.1 ft)
