= XHXU-FM =

Radio station in Frontera, Coahuila

- Frontera, Coahuila; Mexico
- Broadcast area: Frontera, Coahuila
- Frequency: 94.7 MHz
- Branding: La Poderosa

Programming
- Format: Regional Mexican

Ownership
- Owner: Francisco Everardo Elizondo Cedillo

History
- First air date: December 6, 1972 (concession)

Technical information
- Licensing authority: CRT
- Class: B1
- ERP: 25 kW
- HAAT: 1.7 m (5 ft 7 in)
- Transmitter coordinates: 26°56′02″N 101°26′28″W

Links
- Website: archived website

XHXU-FM is a radio station on 94.7 FM in Frontera, Coahuila, known as La Poderosa carries with a regional Mexican format.

== History ==
XEXU-AM 1480 received its concession on December 6, 1972. It was owned by Jesús F. Elizondo Valdéz and was a 1,000-watt daytimer, XHXU migrated to FM in 2015.
