= XHWGR-FM =

Radio station in Monclova, Coahuila, Mexico

- Monclova, Coahuila; Mexico
- Frequency: 101.1 MHz
- Branding: Exa FM

Programming
- Format: Spanish & English Top 40 (CHR)
- Affiliations: MVS Radio

Ownership
- Owner: Núcleo Radio y Televisión; (Radio XEMF, S.A. de C.V.)
- Sister stations: XHEMF-FM

History
- Former frequencies: 1260 AM, 780 AM

Technical information
- Licensing authority: CRT
- Class: B1
- ERP: 10 kW
- HAAT: −55.2 m (−181 ft)

Links
- Webcast: Listen live
- Website: exafm.com

XHWGR-FM is a radio station in Monclova, Coahuila, Mexico, broadcasting on 101.1 MHz. It carries the Exa FM CHR format from MVS Radio.

== History ==
XEMF-AM 1260 received its concession on August 19, 1947. It was owned by Humberto Medina Betancourt. In 1994, XHMF-FM was added to convert the station into an AM-FM combo. Just years later, XEMF/XHMF became XEWGR/XHWGR (the XEMF callsign moved to the former XEQX-AM), and soon after this station moved to 780 kHz.

The AM frequency was turned off on March 27, 2026.
