= XHKD-FM =

Radio station in Ciudad Acuña, Coahuila, Mexico

- Ciudad Acuña, Coahuila; Mexico
- Broadcast area: Coahuila
- Frequency: 103.1 FM
- Branding: Digital 103.1

Programming
- Format: Spanish and english pop music

Ownership
- Owner: RCG Media; (Radiodifusora XEKD, S.A.)
- Sister stations: XHRG-FM, XHPL-FM, XHHAC-FM XHRCG-FM

History
- First air date: April 8, 1956
- Former call signs: XEKD-AM
- Former frequencies: 1010 AM (1956-2018)

Technical information
- ERP: 6 kW
- Transmitter coordinates: 29°20′00″N 100°57′23″W

Links
- Website: RCG Radio website

XHKD-FM is a radio station in Ciudad Acuña, Coahuila, Mexico. Broadcasting on 103.1 FM, XHKD carries a spanish and english Pop music format known as Digital 103.1.

== History ==
The station began as XEKD-AM 1010, with a concession awarded to Casimiro González Martínez and then located on the highway to San Carlos, Coahuila.

The station has remained in his family ever since, being transferred to Amalia Lozano Vda. de González in 1966 and to the current concessionaire in 1987. The concessionaire is owned by Roberto González, who owns stations in the US and Mexico under the name RCommunications and holds family ties to Grupo RCG, In 2013 Migrated to FM, closed off the AM station in 2018 due the young people audience replaced into FM and streaming platforms.
