= Nava, Coahuila =

City in the Mexican state of Coahuila

Nava
- Metropolitan seat and city

- Location in Mexico
- Coordinates: 28°25′17″N 100°46′03″W
- Country: Mexico
- State: Coahuila
- Municipality: Nava
- Elevation: 323 m (1,060 ft)

Population (2010)
  - Total: 22,192

Nava is a city and seat of Nava Municipality, in the north-eastern Mexican state of Coahuila.

Historically, it was the site of the Jesuit mission San Andrés de Nava.
