= XHSHT-FM =

Radio station in Saltillo, Coahuila, Mexico

- Saltillo, Coahuila; Mexico
- Frequency: 102.5 MHz
- Branding: Coahuila Hoy Radio

Programming
- Format: Regional Mexican

Ownership
- Owner: Grupo Radiorama; (XESHT-AM, S.A. de C.V.)
- Operator: Grupo M Radio

History
- First air date: April 29, 1993 (concession)

Technical information
- Licensing authority: CRT
- Class: B1
- ERP: 25 kW
- HAAT: −107.53 m (−352.8 ft)

Links
- Webcast: Listen live
- Website: grupomradio.mx

XHSHT-FM is a radio station on 102.5 FM in Saltillo, Coahuila. The station is owned by Grupo Radiorama and operated by Grupo M Radio and carries a Regional Mexican format known as Coahuila Hoy Radio.

== History ==
XESHT-AM on 1430 kHz received its concession on April 29, 1993. The 500-watt daytimer was owned by Radio Servicio Social, S.A., a subsidiary of Radiorama, and it was later moved to 930 kHz.

XESHT received approval to migrate to FM in 2011. For most of the decade, it was operated by Multimedios Radio, first as La Más Buena and later as La Lupe, a Spanish adult hits format. Multimedios ceased operating XHSHT and XHSAC-FM 99.3 on August 1, 2020; operation of both stations went to RCG Media until December 2021, branding as "La Comadre". The Radiorama "Fiesta Mexicana" Regional Mexican format briefly was used before moving to XHSAC-FM 99.3, in preparation for an imminent launch of the La Mejor franchise from MVS Radio, which debuted on January 31, 2022.

XHSHT ceased carrying La Mejor on September 30, 2025. On October 4, Grupo M Radio began operating the station as Coahuila Hoy Radio with a format of Regional Mexican music and news.
