= XHRE-FM (Coahuila) =

Radio station in Piedras Negras, Coahuila, Mexico

- Piedras Negras, Coahuila; Mexico
- Frequency: 105.5 MHz
- Branding: Vida Romántica

Programming
- Format: Romantic

Ownership
- Owner: XH Medios; (XHMED, S.A. de C.V.)
- Operator: Grupo Radiorama
- Sister stations: XHPSP-FM XHCPN-FM XHSG-FM

History
- First air date: March 23, 1971 (concession)
- Call sign meaning: Ricardo Octavio Elizondo Cedillo (original concessionaire)

Technical information
- Licensing authority: CRT
- Class: B
- ERP: 26,778 watts
- HAAT: 46.1 m (151 ft)
- Transmitter coordinates: 28°41′58″N 100°31′56″W

Links
- Website: radiorama.mx

XHRE-FM is a radio station in Piedras Negras, Coahuila, Mexico. Broadcasting on 105.5 FM, XHRE is operated by Grupo Radiorama and known as Vida Romántica with a romantic format.

== History ==
The concession for XHRE was issued on March 23, 1971 to Ricardo Octavio Elizondo Cedillo. It was originally proposed to operate on 97.3 MHz.

In 2017, Súper Medios de Coahuila sold XHRE to XHMED, S.A. de C.V. and sister XHSL to Master Radiodifusión, S.A. de C.V., with the two stations remaining under common operation. After 14 years with Exa FM, XHRE dropped the format and became Éxtasis Digital, operated by the city's Radiorama cluster.

In 2021, the Radiorama cluster was leased to Grupo RCG; the brand and format were retained. On April 30, 2022, 3 years later eliminating as Éxtasis Digital and became La Más Norteña de Coahuila and ended in July. On August 15, the station launched a romantic station as Vida Romántica, and previously aired on XHSG-FM 99.9.
