= Sabinas, Coahuila =

City in the Mexican state of Coahuila

Sabinas
- Town and Municipality
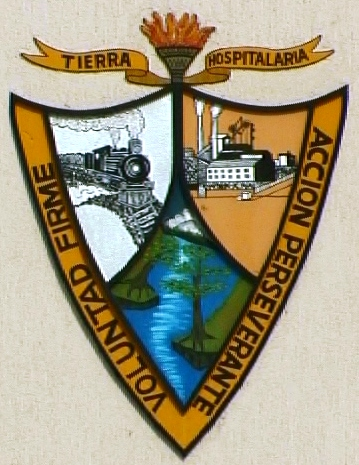
- Coat of arms

- Location within Mexico
- Coordinates: 27°55′N 101°18′W
- Country: Mexico
- State: Coahuila
- Municipality: Sabinas

Government
  - Mayor: Cuaotemoc Rodriguez

Area
  - Town and Municipality: 2,345.2 km^{2} (905.5 sq mi)
- Elevation: 331 m (1,086 ft)

Population (2015)
  - Town and Municipality: 63,522
  - Density: 27.086/km^{2} (70.152/sq mi)
  - Metro: 177,430
  - City: 47,933
- Time zone: UTC−6 (Central (US Central))
- ZipCode: 26700
- Area code: 861
- Website: http://sabinas.gob.mx/

Sabinas is a city in Sabinas Municipality of the same name located in the northeastern quadrant of the state of Coahuila in Mexico. As of the 2005 census the city had a population of 47,933, while the municipality of which the city serves as municipal seat had a population of 53,042. The municipality has an area of 2,345.2 km² (905.49 sq mi). Its only other significant communities are the towns of Cloete and Agujita.

As of 2015, the population of the city was 63,522, while the metropolitan area had a population of 177,430 inhabitants.

== Geography ==
=== Climate ===
The climate of the region is semi-arid.

Climate data for Sabinas (1991–2020)
Month	Jan	Feb	Mar	Apr	May	Jun	Jul	Aug	Sep	Oct	Nov	Dec	Year
Record high °C (°F)	37.0 (98.6)	39.5 (103.1)	42.0 (107.6)	46.5 (115.7)	46.0 (114.8)	46.0 (114.8)	45.0 (113.0)	46.5 (115.7)	46.0 (114.8)	41.5 (106.7)	38.0 (100.4)	36.0 (96.8)	46.5 (115.7)
Mean daily maximum °C (°F)	21.7 (71.1)	24.5 (76.1)	28.4 (83.1)	32.2 (90.0)	35.2 (95.4)	37.7 (99.9)	38.1 (100.6)	38.6 (101.5)	34.7 (94.5)	30.3 (86.5)	25.1 (77.2)	21.7 (71.1)	30.7 (87.3)
Daily mean °C (°F)	13.5 (56.3)	16.3 (61.3)	20.4 (68.7)	24.2 (75.6)	27.9 (82.2)	30.6 (87.1)	31.0 (87.8)	31.3 (88.3)	28.0 (82.4)	23.3 (73.9)	17.7 (63.9)	13.5 (56.3)	23.1 (73.6)
Mean daily minimum °C (°F)	5.3 (41.5)	8.1 (46.6)	12.4 (54.3)	16.2 (61.2)	20.6 (69.1)	23.5 (74.3)	24.0 (75.2)	24.0 (75.2)	21.3 (70.3)	16.3 (61.3)	10.2 (50.4)	5.4 (41.7)	15.6 (60.1)
Record low °C (°F)	−12.5 (9.5)	−9.0 (15.8)	−5.0 (23.0)	1.0 (33.8)	2.0 (35.6)	2.5 (36.5)	12.0 (53.6)	15.0 (59.0)	8.5 (47.3)	0.0 (32.0)	−6.0 (21.2)	−9.0 (15.8)	−12.5 (9.5)
Average precipitation mm (inches)	12.3 (0.48)	10.6 (0.42)	26.0 (1.02)	39.9 (1.57)	75.6 (2.98)	46.9 (1.85)	57.3 (2.26)	52.3 (2.06)	84.9 (3.34)	39.4 (1.55)	18.3 (0.72)	11.7 (0.46)	475.2 (18.71)
Average precipitation days (≥ 0.1 mm)	4.1	3.6	3.5	4.0	5.6	4.3	4.4	4.4	6.4	6.0	5.2	3.8	55.3
Source: Servicio Meteorologico Nacional
