= XHRCG-TDT =

TV station in Saltillo, Coahuila, Mexico

- Saltillo, Coahuila; Mexico
- Channels: Digital: 30 (UHF); Virtual: 8
- Branding: RCG Televisión Saltillo

Programming
- Affiliations: FOROtv; Televisa Regional

Ownership
- Owner: Grupo Empresarial RCG; (Roberto Casimiro González Treviño)
- Sister stations: XHZCN-FM, XHSJ-FM

History
- First air date: September 7, 1968
- Former call signs: XHAD-TV
- Former channel number: 7 (1968-2016)
- Call sign meaning: Roberto Casimiro González

Technical information
- Licensing authority: CRT
- ERP: 31 kW
- HAAT: −185.2 m (−608 ft)
- Transmitter coordinates: 25°26′37″N 100°59′22″W

Links
- Website: rcg.com.mx

XHCAW-TDT
- Ciudad Acuña, Coahuila; Mexico
- Channels: Digital: 36 (UHF); Virtual: 58
- Branding: RCG Acuña

Ownership
- Owner: Grupo Empresarial RCG; (Hilda Graciela Rivera Flores)

History
- Founded: December 8, 1991 (concession)
- Call sign meaning: Ciudad Acuña plus a W for Coahuila

Technical information
- Licensing authority: CRT
- ERP: 20.9 kW
- Transmitter coordinates: 29°18′09.7″N 100°55′30.9″W

Links
- Website: rcg.com.mx

XHRCG-TDT, also known as RCG Televisión Saltillo, is a television station located in Saltillo, Coahuila, Mexico. The station was previously a Televisa local station, with programming from FOROtv. It currently airs as its own local productions and news, and is owned by Grupo RCG.

== History ==
XHRCG came to air as XHAD-TV, owned by Alberto Jaubert and receiving its concession in 1968. Broadcasts started on September 7 that year as an affiliate of Televisión Independiente de México, led by XHTM-TV. In the 1980s, after Jaubert's death, the station was sold to Roberto Casimiro González Treviño, and in 1991 it was rechristened XHRCG-TV.

The station has a repeater, XHCAW-TDT channel 36 (virtual channel 58) in Ciudad Acuña. XHCAW produces its own local news but is tightly integrated into XHRCG's programming.

RCG Televisión gained international attention during its coverage of the solar eclipse of April 8, 2024, where the station accidentally broadcast footage of a man's testicles being "eclipsed". The video was sent by Twitter user Rhevolver who claims copyright over the video, but said video had been circulating since at least the Chilean eclipse of 2019.

== Digital television ==
XHRCG and XHCAW applied for and built digital facilities in 2015. XHRCG was the last station to come to air in Saltillo; it went off air along with other stations there on December 11. XHCAW went off the air with stations in Acuña on the 22nd.
