= XHSG-FM =

Radio station in Piedras Negras, Coahuila

- Piedras Negras, Coahuila; Mexico
- Frequency: 99.9 FM
- Branding: Vida

Programming
- Format: Romantic

Ownership
- Owner: Grupo Audiorama Comunicaciones; (Impulsora Radial del Norte, S.A. de C.V.)

History
- First air date: October 27, 1980 (concession)

Technical information
- Licensing authority: CRT
- Class: B1
- ERP: 21.69 kW
- HAAT: 135.14 m (443.4 ft)

Links
- Webcast: Listen live
- Website: audiorama.mx

XHSG-FM is a radio station on 99.9 FM in Piedras Negras, Coahuila. It is owned by Grupo Audiorama Comunicaciones and is known as Vida.

== History ==
XHSG received its concession on October 27, 1980. It was owned by Humberto Ricardo Medina Ainslie, the father of Rodrigo Medina, the governor of Nuevo León from 2009 to 2015. XHSG was sold in 2006 to its current concessionaire.
