= XHCPN-FM =

Radio station in Piedras Negras, Coahuila, Mexico

- Piedras Negras, Coahuila; Mexico
- Frequency: 101.7 FM
- Branding: @FM (Arroba FM)

Programming
- Format: Spanish & English Top 40 (CHR)

Ownership
- Owner: Grupo Radiorama; (XECPN-AM, S.A. de C.V.)

History
- First air date: November 14, 1988 (concession)
- Call sign meaning: Coahuila Piedras Negras

Technical information
- Licensing authority: CRT
- Class: A
- ERP: 3 kW
- HAAT: 29.1 m (95 ft)
- Transmitter coordinates: 28°41′58″N 100°31′56″W

Links
- Webcast: Listen live
- Website: arroba.fm

XHCPN-FM is a radio station on 101.7 FM in Piedras Negras, Coahuila, Mexico. It is owned by Grupo Radiorama and carries its Arroba FM (@FM) contemporary hit radio format.

== History ==
XHCPN began as XECPN-AM 1320, receiving its concession on November 14, 1988. It was then owned by Víctor Nasip Harb Karam. In February 1999, Karam traded XECPN to Radiorama in order to acquire XEMDA-AM in Monclova.

It migrated to FM in 2011.
