= WRDW =

WRDW may refer to:

- WCHZ (AM), a former radio station (1480 AM) licensed to serve Augusta, Georgia, United States, which held WRDW call sign from 1930 until October 2003
- WRDW (AM), a former radio station (1630 AM) licensed to serve Augusta, which held the WRDW call sign from 2003 until its deletion in 2020
- WRDW-TV, a television station (channel 12) licensed to serve Augusta
- WAGT-CD, a low-power television station (channel 16) licensed to serve Augusta, which held the call sign WRDW-CD from 2015 to 2016
- WTDY-FM, a radio station (96.5 FM) licensed to serve Philadelphia, Pennsylvania, United States, which held the call sign WRDW-FM from February 2004 until April 2015
