= WGAC =

WGAC may refer to:

- WGAC (AM), a radio station (580 AM) licensed to serve Augusta, Georgia, United States
- WGAC-FM, a radio station (95.1 FM) licensed to serve Harlem, Georgia
- Who Gives A Crap, an Australian toilet paper company
- WCHZ-FM, a radio station (93.1 FM) licensed to serve Warrenton, Georgia, which held the call sign WGAC-FM from 2003 to 2011
