= Mass media in Augusta, Georgia =

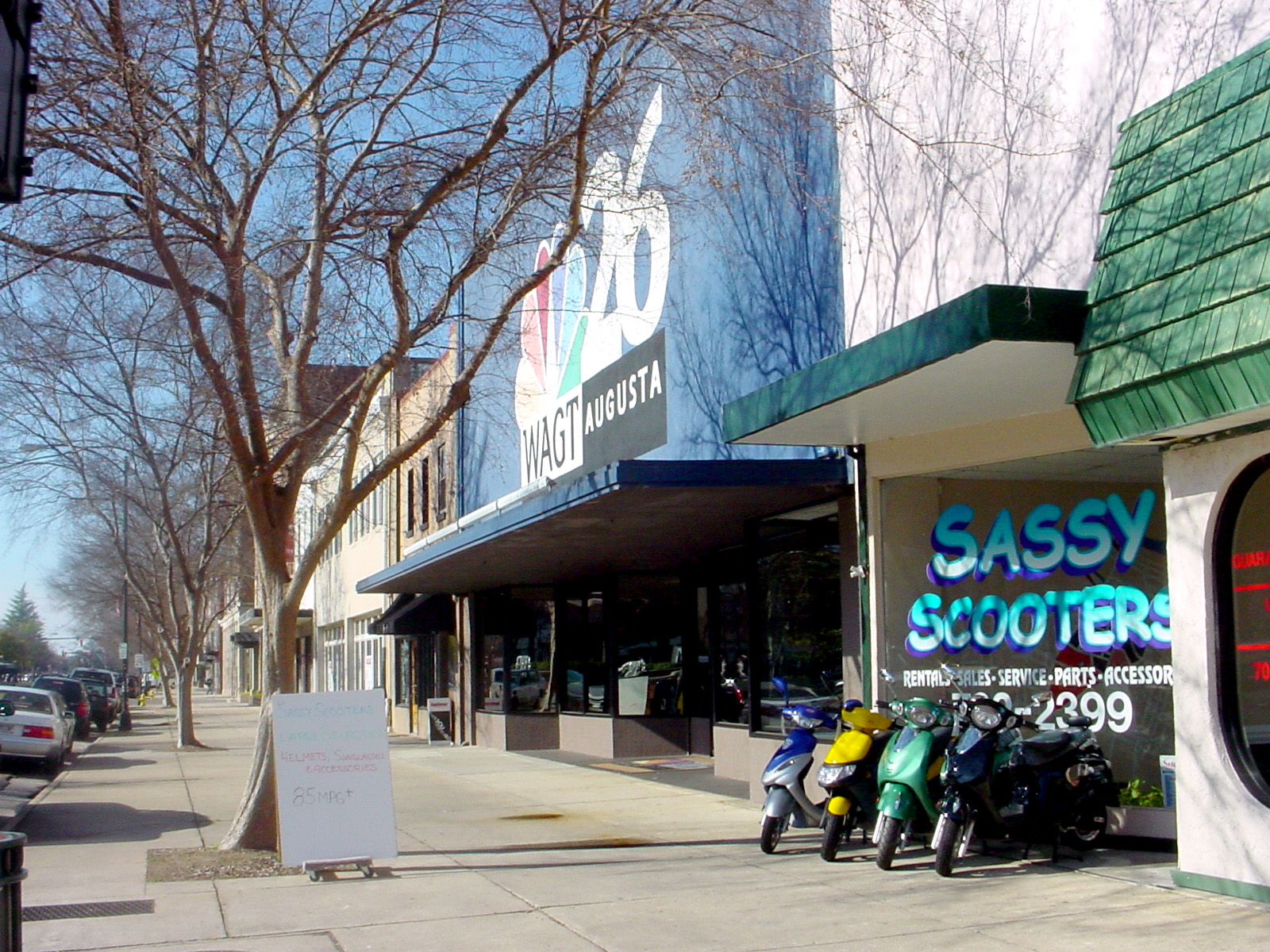
Former WAGT studios in downtown Augusta

Media outlets in the Augusta, Georgia, United States market include eight television stations, 24 FM radio stations, nine AM radio stations, one Internet radio station and numerous print media.

== Television ==
All broadcast television stations are licensed to Augusta unless otherwise noted:

- 6 WJBF Augusta (ABC)
- 12 WRDW-TV Augusta (CBS)
- 14 WEBA-TV Allendale, SC (SCETV/PBS)
- 20 WCES-TV Wrens (GPB/PBS)
- 23 WAAU-LD Augusta
- 26 WAGT-CD Augusta (NBC, The CW on 26.2)
- 49 WBPI-CD Augusta (Religious independent)
- 54 WFXG Augusta (Fox)

== Radio ==
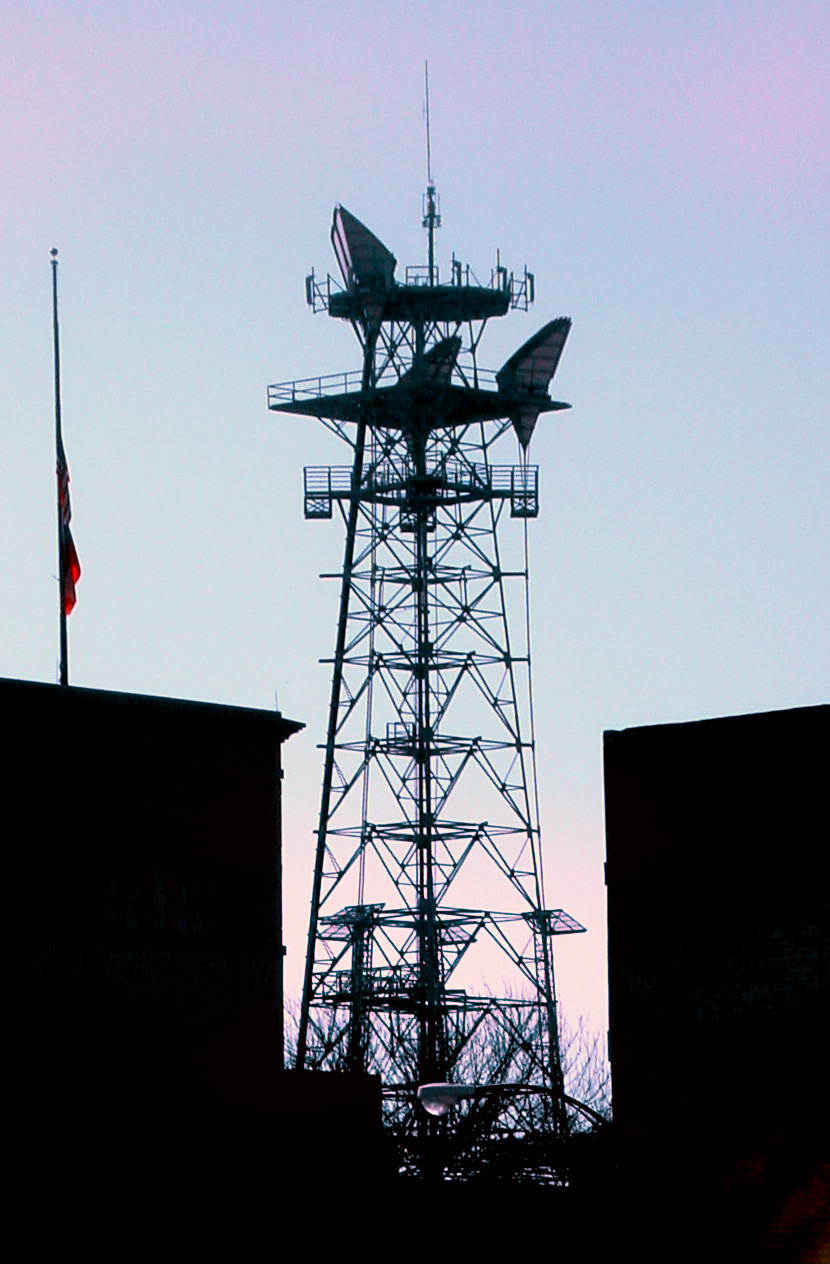
Radio tower in downtown Augusta

=== FM ===
Stations broadcasting on the FM frequency:

- 88.3 WAFJ Belvedere, SC (Christian contemporary)
- 89.1 WLJK Aiken, SC (NPR/SCPR)
- 90.7 WACG-FM Augusta (NPR/GPB)
- 91.7 WLPE Augusta (GNN Radio)
- 92.3 WAEG Evans (Smooth jazz)
- 92.5 WEKS Zebulon (Country)
- 92.7 WLFW Johnston, SC (Southern gospel)
- 92.9 WYBO Waynesboro (Classic soul)
- 93.9 WDRR Martinez (Adult hits/Bob FM)
- 94.7 WAAW Williston, SC (Urban gospel)
- 95.1 WGAC-FM Harlem (Talk radio)
- 95.5 WCHZ Warrenton (Classic hip-hop)
- 96.3 WKSP Aiken, SC (Urban adult contemporary)
- 96.9 WTHB-FM Wrens (Urban gospel)
- 97.9 WIIZ Blackville, SC (Mainstream urban)
- 98.3 WHHD Clearwater, SC (Contemporary hit radio)
- 99.5 WKXC-FM Aiken, SC (Country)
- 100.3 WRMK-LP Augusta (Religious)
- 100.9 WAKB Hephzibah (Urban adult contemporary)
- 101.7 WTHO-FM Thomson (Country)
- 102.3 WEKL Augusta (K-Love)
- 102.7 WGUS-FM New Ellenton, SC (Southern gospel)
- 103.1 WFXA-FM Augusta (Mainstream urban)
- 103.7 WKZK North Augusta, SC (Urban gospel)
- 104.3 WBBQ-FM Augusta (Adult contemporary)
- 105.7 WLUB Augusta (Country)
- 106.5 WMCD Rocky Ford (Country)
- 106.7 WTCB Orangeburg, SC (Adult contemporary)
- 107.1 WYFA Waynesboro (Bible Broadcasting Network)
- 107.7 WPRW-FM Martinez (Urban contemporary)

=== AM ===
Stations broadcasting on the AM frequency:

- 580 WGAC Augusta (Talk radio)
- 1050 WFAM Augusta (Christian radio)
- 1230 WEZO Augusta (Urban AC and gospel)
- 1340 WYNF Augusta (Black Information Network)
- 1380 WNRR North Augusta, SC (Talk radio)
- 1550 WTHB Augusta (Talk radio and gospel)
- 1600 WKZK North Augusta, SC (Urban gospel)

=== Internet radio station ===
Stations broadcasting solely on the Internet:

Show station details
Station	Station branding	Station format	Owner
Solid Rock Radio	Plug In To The Rock	Christian Rock	William Lee Moore

== Print media ==
Local newspapers based in Augusta:

Newspaper name	Type	Circulation	Owner
The Augusta Chronicle	Daily newspaper	70,000	USA Today Co.
Augusta Medical Examiner	Twice-monthly newspaper Local and national health and medical news	30,000+	www.AugustaRx.com
The Metro Courier	Weekly newspaper Targeted to the African American community		
Metro Spirit	Free newspaper Alternative news weekly	23,000	
The Augusta Press	Daily online newspaper		

== See also ==
- Arts and culture in Augusta, Georgia
- Georgia media
  - Media of cities in Georgia: Athens, Atlanta, Columbus, Macon, Savannah
