= WGUS-FM =

Coordinates: 33.514°N 81.634°W

- New Ellenton, South Carolina; United States
- Broadcast area: Augusta, Georgia
- Frequency: 102.7 MHz
- Branding: Sunny 102.7

Programming
- Format: Defunct

Ownership
- Owner: Beasley Broadcast Group, Inc.; (Beasley Media Group Licenses, LLC)
- Sister stations: WDRR; WHHD; WCHZ-FM; WKXC-FM; WGAC; WGAC-FM

History
- First air date: 1990 (as WAJY)
- Last air date: September 27, 2024
- Former call signs: WAJY (1990–2004); WGOR (2004–2006)
- Call sign meaning: Augusta

Technical information
- Licensing authority: FCC
- Facility ID: 25467
- Class: A
- ERP: 4,300 watts
- HAAT: 118 meters (387 ft)

Links
- Public license information: Public file; LMS

WGUS-FM 102.7 was a soft adult contemporary radio station licensed to New Ellenton, South Carolina, but was part of the Augusta, Georgia radio market. The station was licensed by the Federal Communications Commission (FCC) to broadcast on 102.7 FM with an ERP of 4.3 kW. WGUS-FM was owned by the Beasley Broadcast Group, Inc., through licensee Beasley Media Group Licenses, LLC. Its studios were located just two blocks from the Augusta-Richmond County border in unincorporated Columbia County, Georgia, and the transmitter was east of Aiken, South Carolina. The station operated from 1990 to 2024.

== History ==
The station signed on in 1990 as WAJY with an adult standards format as "Joy 102.7". In 2004, it became contemporary Christian—still using the "Joy 102.7" brand—for a brief time before being sold to Beasley Broadcasting, who moved the oldies format of WGOR from 93.9 FM to 102.7 FM in October 2004, becoming "Oldies 102.7".

On October 27, 2006, WGOR switched to Christmas music for the season as "Santa 102.7". The station changed formats on December 26 of that year, revealing its southern gospel format under the WGUS-FM call letters. This was not the first time that the WGUS-FM call letters were used in the Augusta market. Before the 1990s, the WGUS-FM call letters were on 102.3 FM (now WIBL).

On August 28, 2020, WGUS-FM changed its format from southern gospel to soft AC, branded as "Sunny 102.7".

WGUS-FM went silent on September 27, 2024, due to damage from Hurricane Helene. Its license was surrendered in September 2025, coinciding with the automatic expiration of the station's license for being silent over a year.

== See also ==
- Media in Augusta, Georgia
