= WEKL =

K-Love radio station in Augusta, Georgia, United States

- Augusta, Georgia; United States
- Frequency: 102.3 MHz

Programming
- Format: Contemporary Christian
- Network: K-Love

Ownership
- Owner: Educational Media Foundation

History
- First air date: November 11, 1967
- Former call signs: WZNY (2010–2013); WIBL (2007–2010); WEKL (1994–2007); WXFG (1993–1994); WOPW (1990?–1991?); WGUS-FM (1967–1990?; 1991–1993)
- Call sign meaning: Contains KL for K-Love

Technical information
- Licensing authority: FCC
- Facility ID: 72468
- Class: A
- ERP: 1,500 watts
- HAAT: 203 meters (666 ft)
- Transmitter coordinates: 33°26′15.5″N 82°05′26.4″W (NAD83)
- Translator: (98.9 MHz) W255AS (Augusta)

Links
- Public license information: Public file; LMS
- Website: klove.com

WEKL, known on-air as "K-Love", is a Contemporary Christian radio station in the United States, licensed by the Federal Communications Commission (FCC) to Augusta, Georgia, broadcasting on 102.3 MHz with an ERP of 1.5 kW. Its studios are located at the Augusta Corporate Center with the market's other iHeartMedia owned sister stations in Augusta, and the transmitter is located in Augusta near Fort Gordon.

== History ==
102.3 FM signed on as WGUS-FM in late 1967. The station was the FM sister to 1380 WGUS (now WNRR North Augusta, South Carolina) and simulcasted the country format that the AM had from 6 a.m. to 12 midnight under the "Big Gus" nickname. The station went to 24-hour operations in 1970.

In early 1973, WGUS-FM's simulcast with the AM was replaced with an automated beautiful music format and the station became known as "102G". This lasted until the late 70s, when the station switched back to country. As of 1989, the station continued to simulcast 1380 WGUS. WGUS was known as "CountryAugusta WGUS" and was an affiliate of American Country Countdown hosted by Bob Kingsley.

In 1990, the station dropped its country format for CHR as "Power 102" under the WOPW call letters in an attempt to go after longtime CHR powerhouse, WBBQ. This failed, and the station went for a variety hits format under the name "102.3 WOPW" briefly, before switching back to country, becoming Froggy 102. A brief return to its former name of Big Gus preceded its most successful change. The station became WEKL as "Eagle 102" and a classic rock format was adopted in July 1994.

On August 13, 2007, WEKL traded frequencies with sister country outlet WIBL (105.7 The Bull), moving the WEKL format to the much stronger signal at 105.7. The station was re-launched as "Eagle 105.7", while WIBL moved to 102.3, becoming "102.3 The Bull."

On April 1, 2010, the station dropped its Country format for Top 40, becoming Y102.3, a reference to the former branding of Clear Channel Top 40 station Y-105 (105.7, now WLUB). This move displaced the country format that had displaced Y105 years earlier while it was on 105.7. The station started advertising the night before by following people on Twitter, and announced "the return of Y in the CSRA". The station kicked off its launch on 102.3 by playing 5000 songs in a row commercial-free. When competitor WHHD attempted a 5000 songs promotion, Y102.3 doubled the launch to 10,000 songs in a row. At the conclusion of the promotion the station introduced advertising.

The station is owned by Aloha Station Trust, the entity formed to operate and sell the former Clear Channel Communications stations that were required to be divested for the Clear Channel privatization transaction. With the launch of the new format, Aloha Station Trust applied to the FCC for the former Y-105 callsign, WZNY. The callsign change was approved by the FCC.

On November 8, 2013, WZNY stunted with a simulcast of WEKL before assuming its Classic Rock format as, once again Eagle 102.3 as 105.7 flipped to Country as "G105.7" (and would later bring back the “105.7 The Bull” branding). On November 21, 2013, WZNY changed its callsign to WEKL.

On March 3, 2019, iHeart announced it would sell 4 stations in its Aloha Station Trust, including WEKL, to the Educational Media Foundation in exchange for 6 translators already operated by iHeart. The station is expected to flip to one of EMF's national networks (K-Love, Air 1, or K-Love Classics) upon the sale's closure.

On March 11, 2019, WEKL began simulcasting on WLUB-HD2 and W292EE and rebranded as Eagle 106.3. The two stations simulcasted until May 31, 2019, when the sale closed, which at that point EMF flipped the station to their "K-Love" branding.

== See also ==
- Media in Augusta, Georgia
