= WGUS =

WGUS may refer to:

- WGUS-FM, a radio station (102.7 FM) licensed to New Ellenton, South Carolina
- WCHZ (AM), a defunct radio station (1480 AM) licensed to Augusta, Georgia, which held the call sign WGUS from 2003 to 2012
