= WTEL =

WTEL may refer to:

- WTEL (AM), a radio station (610 AM) licensed to Philadelphia, Pennsylvania, United States
- WYDU, a radio station in Red Springs, North Carolina, United States, which held the call sign WTEL from 1998 until 2000, 2000 until 2001, and 2003 until 2014
- WCHZ (AM), a radio station in Augusta, Georgia, United States, which held the call sign WTEL in 2003
- WRDW (AM), a radio station in Augusta, Georgia, United States, which held the call sign WTEL from 2001 until 2003
- WWDB, a radio station in Bala Cynwyd, Pennsylvania, United States, which held the call sign WTEL from 1930 until 1998, and in 2000
