= WZNY =

WZNY may refer to:

- WZNY-LP, a low-power radio station (98.3 FM) licensed to Fairport, New York, United States
- WEKL, a radio station (102.3 FM) licensed to Augusta, Georgia, United States, which held the call sign WZNY from 2010 to 2013
- WLUB, a radio station (105.7 FM) licensed to Augusta, Georgia, United States, which held the call sign WZNY from 1985 to 2004
