= WAGT =

WAGT may refer to:

- WAGT (TV), a defunct television station (channel 30, virtual 26) formerly licensed to serve Augusta, Georgia, United States
  - WAGT-DT2, a digital subchannel of WAGT
- WAGT-CD, a low-power television station (channel 30, virtual 26) licensed to serve Augusta, Georgia
