= WCHZ =

WCHZ may refer to:

- WCHZ (AM), a defunct radio station (1480 AM) formerly licensed to serve Augusta, Georgia, United States
- WCHZ-FM, a radio station (93.1 FM) licensed to serve Warrenton, Georgia
