= WIGL =

WIGL may refer to:

- WIGL-LD, a low-power television station (channel 8, virtual 38) licensed to Athens, Georgia
- WAMR-FM, a radio station (104.9 FM) licensed to Miami, Florida which held the call sign WIGL from 1974 to 1979
- WTCB, a radio station (106.7 FM) licensed to Orangeburg, South Carolina which held the call sign WIGL from 1982 to 1985
- WFAM, a radio station (1050 AM) licensed to Augusta, Georgia which held the call sign WIGL from 1985 to 1986
- WCWB, a radio station (104.9 FM) licensed to Marathon, Wisconsin which held the call sign WIGL in 1987
- WQKI-FM, a radio station (102.9 FM) licensed to Orangeburg, South Carolina which held the call sign WIGL from 1987 to 2003
- WSCZ, a radio station (93.9 FM) licensed to Winnsboro, South Carolina which held the call sign WIGL from 2003 to 2010
