= WSGF =

WSGF may refer to:

- WSGF-LP, a low-power radio station (102.7 FM) licensed to serve Bloomingdale, Georgia, United States
- WYNF, a radio station (1340 AM) licensed to serve Augusta, Georgia, which held the call sign WSGF from 2004 to 2010
