= News 12 =

News 12 may refer to:

- KSLA-TV Shreveport, Louisiana
- News 12 Networks, 24-hour local cable news television network in Connecticut, New Jersey, and New York
- WRDW-TV Augusta, Georgia
