= WBBQ-FM =

Radio station in Augusta, Georgia, United States

- Augusta, Georgia; United States
- Broadcast area: Augusta metropolitan area
- Frequency: 104.3 MHz (HD Radio)
- Branding: 104.3 WBBQ

Programming
- Format: Adult contemporary
- Subchannels: HD2: "iHeartChristmas Country"
- Affiliations: Premiere Networks

Ownership
- Owner: iHeartMedia, Inc.; (iHM Licenses, LLC)
- Sister stations: WKSP, WLUB, WPRW-FM, WYNF

History
- First air date: 1958
- Call sign meaning: Barbecue

Technical information
- Licensing authority: FCC
- Facility ID: 59249
- Class: C0
- ERP: 80,000 watts
- HAAT: 436 m (1,430 ft)
- Transmitter coordinates: 33°25′17.1″N 81°50′18″W

Links
- Public license information: Public file; LMS
- Webcast: FM/HD1: Listen Live; HD2: Country Christmas Listen Live
- Website: wbbq.iheart.com

WBBQ-FM (104.3 MHz) is a commercial FM radio station in Augusta, Georgia. It carries an adult contemporary radio format and is owned by iHeartMedia, Inc. For much of November and December, WBBQ-FM switches to Christmas music. The radio studios and offices are located at the Augusta Corporate Center on Perimeter Parkway, near the I-20/I-520 interchange in Augusta.

WBBQ-FM has an effective radiated power (ERP) of 80,000 watts. The transmitter is off Pine Log Road near Williston Road (U.S. Route 278) in Beech Island, South Carolina.

== Station history ==
In 1958, WBBQ-FM signed on as the sister station to WBBQ 1340 AM (now WYNF). The two stations simulcast their programming through the 1960s and 70s. Both stations switched to Top 40 hits under the guidance of Edward H. Dunbar beginning in the early 1960s. WBBQ-AM-FM was the #1 station in the Augusta market for over 35 years. In addition, the station had a top-notch news department. Both WBBQ AM and WBBQ FM were owned by George Weiss under his company, Savannah Valley Broadcasting.

In August 1994, the new station manager Birnie Florie (a former news reporter and salesman) ordered that WBBQ swap formats with newly acquired sister FM WZNY. WBBQ became an adult contemporary station and WZNY switched to Top 40.

In 1997, Weiss donated WBBQ and WZNY to the Medical College of Georgia shortly before he died due to cancer. MCG, in turn, sold the stations to Cumulus Broadcasting for $14 million. The money was used to establish the Weiss Endowment for Research for cancer research.

Cumulus sold WBBQ in 2000 to Clear Channel Communications (now known as iHeartMedia).

After spending more than 20 years as an Adult Contemporary-formatted station, WBBQ in the early 2000s began leaning more Hot AC in its musical style. Instituted under previous program director and music director Cliff Bennett, the station started dropping slower songs more commonly found on AC stations and focused more on upbeat, uptempo music with a hard lean towards 2000s and 2010s hit music. The station still avoids hip-hop and most electronic music more commonly found now on Top 40/CHR stations but has positioned itself against variety-formatted, now 80s-formatted WDRR and Top 40/CHR WHHD.

== Current station lineup ==
Due to layoffs imposed in 2020 by parent company iHeartMedia, the station no longer has any local on-air talent and is now programmed using national iHeart talent through voicetracking and radio syndication. Monday through Saturday mornings, the Premiere Networks syndicated wake up show, Murphy, Sam & Jodi is carried. Weekday evenings, the call-in and request show Delilah, also from Premiere Networks, is heard.

Weekdays:

- 12 am-5 am: Theresa Lucas
- 5 am-9 am: Murphy, Sam & Jodi
- 9 am-2 pm: Jana
- 2 pm-7 pm: Jeff Stevens
- 7 pm-12 am: Delilah

Saturdays:

- 12 am-6 am: Brett Andrews
- 6 am-10 am: Murphy, Sam & Jodi
- 10 am-3 pm: Jana
- 3 pm-7 pm: Jack Kratoville
- 7 pm-12 am: Madison

Sundays:

- 12 am-6 am: Theresa Lucas
- 6 am-10 am: Jeff Stevens
- 10 am-3 pm: Madison
- 3 pm-7 pm: Jack Kratoville
- 7 pm-12 am: Brett Andrews

== See also ==
- Media in Augusta, Georgia
