= NBC 26 =

NBC 26 may refer to the following television stations in the United States:

- WGBA-TV, Green Bay, Wisconsin
- WAGT-CD, Augusta, Georgia
