= WBPI-CD =

Television station in Augusta, Georgia

- Augusta, Georgia; United States
- Channels: Digital: 19 (UHF); Virtual: 49
- Branding: Watchmen Broadcasting; WBPI TV-49

Programming
- Affiliations: Religious Independent

Ownership
- Owner: Watchmen Broadcasting; (Watchmen Broadcasting Productions International, Inc.)

History
- Founded: September 9, 1992
- Former call signs: W36BM (1992–1998); W49CA (1998–2000); WBPI-LP (2000–2003); WBPI-CA (2003–2009)
- Former channel numbers: Analog: 36 (UHF, 1995–2001), 49 (UHF, 2001–2009); Digital: 49 (UHF, 2009–2018)
- Call sign meaning: Watchmen Broadcasting Productions International

Technical information
- Licensing authority: FCC
- Facility ID: 17464
- Class: CD
- ERP: 15 kW
- HAAT: 222.4 m (730 ft)
- Transmitter coordinates: 33°30′55.5″N 81°56′22.7″W
- Translator(s): W19FD-D Terre Haute, IN

Links
- Public license information: Public file; LMS
- Website: www.wbpi.org

WBPI-CD (channel 49) is a low-power, Class A religious television station in Augusta, Georgia, United States, owned by Watchmen Broadcasting. The station's studios are located on Knox Avenue, and its transmitter is located on Bradley Drive, both in North Augusta, South Carolina.

== Subchannels ==
The station's signal is multiplexed:

Subchannels of WBPI-CD
Channel	Res.	Short name	Programming
49.1	720p	WBPI	Main WBPI-CD programming
49.2	480i	Harvest	Biz TV (4:3)
49.3	480i	WNRR	Audio simulcast of WNRR (4:3)
49.4	480i	INT-TV	

== See also ==
- Media in Augusta, Georgia
