= WPRW-FM =

Coordinates: 33.613167°N 82.297333°W

- Martinez, Georgia; United States
- Broadcast area: Augusta, Georgia
- Frequency: 107.7 MHz (HD Radio)
- Branding: Power 107

Programming
- Format: Mainstream urban
- Subchannels: HD2: "iHeartChristmas Rock"
- Affiliations: Premiere Networks

Ownership
- Owner: iHeartMedia, Inc.; (iHM Licenses, LLC)
- Sister stations: WBBQ-FM, WKSP, WLUB, WYNF

History
- First air date: 1994; 32 years ago (as WKBG)
- Former call signs: WKBG (1992–1996); WUUS (1996–1999)
- Call sign meaning: "Power"

Technical information
- Licensing authority: FCC
- Facility ID: 46967
- Class: C2
- ERP: 24,500 watts
- HAAT: 176 m (577 ft)

Links
- Public license information: Public file; LMS
- Webcast: Listen Live; HD2: Listen Live
- Website: power107.iheart.com

WPRW-FM (107.7 MHz), also known as "Power 107", is a mainstream urban station in the Augusta, Georgia, radio market. The station is licensed by the Federal Communications Commission (FCC) to Martinez and has an effective radiated power (ERP) of 24.5 kW. Its studios are located at the Augusta Corporate Center near the I-20/I-520 interchange in Augusta, and the transmitter tower is north of Appling, Georgia.

== History ==
The station signed on as WKBG in 1994 with a country format. In 1996, WKBG was purchased by Wilkes Broadcasting and became WUUS, re-branding itself as "US 107". Wilkes also purchased WGUS-AM-FM and WRXR and housed all three stations in the WGUS building. US-107 hired the former morning talent from Kicks 99 (Jill and Charlie) and the former morning man from WBBQ (Mark Summers) and spent much of the late-1990s going up against established country outlet WKXC-FM, but fared poorly in the ratings. The stations were sold to Cumulus Media in 1998.

In November 1999, the station switched over to urban as WPRW, adopting the "Power 107" handle. This station became the first serious challenger to longtime urban outlet WFXA and both stations have been battling each other in the ratings ever since. At one time WPRW was the syndicated home of the Star and Buc Wild Morning Show; it now carries The Breakfast Club in the mornings.

The station is owned by iHeartMedia and competes with WFXA and WIIZ.

== See also ==
- Media in Augusta, Georgia
