= WKBG =

WKBG may refer to:

- WLVI, a television station (digital 35/virtual 56) licensed to Cambridge, Massachusetts, which held the call sign WKBG from 1966 to 1974
- WPRW-FM, a radio station (107.7 FM) licensed to Martinez, Georgia, which held the call sign WKBG from 1992 to 1996
- WLLE, a radio station (102.1 FM) licensed to Mayfield, Kentucky, which held the call sign WKBG from 2003 to 2004
