= WYNF =

Black Information Network affiliate station in Augusta, Georgia

- Augusta, Georgia; United States
- Frequency: 1340 kHz
- Branding: Augusta's BIN 1340

Programming
- Format: Black-oriented news
- Affiliations: Black Information Network

Ownership
- Owner: iHeartMedia; (iHM Licenses, LLC)
- Sister stations: WBBQ-FM, WKSP, WLUB, WPRW-FM

History
- First air date: 1947; 79 years ago (as WBBQ)
- Former call signs: WBBQ (1947–2002); WINZ (2002–2004); WSGF (2004–2010)

Technical information
- Licensing authority: FCC
- Facility ID: 59248
- Class: C
- Power: 1,000 watts day 990 watts night
- Transmitter coordinates: 33°29′37″N 81°59′52″W

Links
- Public license information: Public file; LMS
- Webcast: Listen Live
- Website: augusta.binnews.com

WYNF (1340 AM) is a radio station licensed to Augusta, Georgia, United States. The station is owned by iHeartMedia, and serves as Augusta's affiliate for the Black Information Network. Its studios are located at the Augusta Corporate Center near the I-20/I-520 interchange in Augusta, and the transmitter tower is west of Paine College in Augusta.

== History ==
In February 1999, WBBQ became an affiliate of Radio Disney. In February 2000, WBBQ dropped the Radio Disney programming and switched to the ESPN Radio.

Up until September 2010, this station, as WSGF, carried a gospel music format as "Hallelujah 1340". In September 2010, WYNF and its sports radio format moved to 1340; the call sign and format were previously on 1380, which was sold off and later became WNRR.

On June 29, 2020, fifteen iHeartMedia stations in markets with large African American populations, including WYNF, began stunting with African American speeches, interspersed with messages such as "Our Voices Will Be Heard" and "Our side of the story is about to be told", with a new format slated to launch on June 30. That day, WYNF, along with the other fourteen stations, became the launch stations for the Black Information Network, an African American-oriented all-news radio network. Prior to the change, WYNF was a Fox Sports Radio affiliate.

== See also ==
- Media in Augusta, Georgia
