= WRMK-LP =

Coordinates: 33.503°N 82.060°W

- Augusta, Georgia; United States
- Frequency: 100.3 FM

Programming
- Format: Religious

Ownership
- Owner: Good News Church

History
- First air date: 2003
- Call sign meaning: named in honor of the primary benefactors, Ralph and Martha Kennedy

Technical information
- Licensing authority: FCC
- Class: L1
- ERP: 100 watts
- HAAT: 26.8 meters

Links
- Public license information: LMS
- Website: https://www.goodnewsaugusta.com/ministries-old/faith100/faith100.html

WRMK-LP (100.3 FM) is a low power broadcasting radio station in Augusta, Georgia. The station is licensed by the Federal Communications Commission (FCC) to broadcast with an effective radiated power (ERP) of 100 watts. The station is co-located with Good News Church at 400 Warren Road, Augusta, Georgia. The FM signal covers a radius of four to six miles around the transmitter location on Warren Rd which allows the station to cover a majority of Augusta/Richmond County and parts of Columbia County, Georgia; as well as a small portion of Aiken County, South Carolina. WRMK broadcasts the Word of Faith message, and powerful praise and worship music 24 hours a day in the CSRA (Central Savannah River Area).

== History ==
In the spring of 2000, a fellow minister who owns a broadcast radio network approached Pastors Matt & Suzie with news of a unique opportunity which the FCC had created to license a series of low-power FM radio stations to non-profit organizations. The FCC granted Good News Church one of only seventeen construction permits in April 2001. In November 2001, Pastor Susie's father, Ralph Kennedy, the driving force behind the station's inception died. In honor of Ralph and his wife, Martha Kennedy, Good News Church applied for and received the call sign WRMK. After 18 months and $25,000 in donations, the station WRMK signed on the air shortly after 11:00 am on Sunday September 30, 2002. The FCC granted full permission to operate on January 29, 2003. The station is wholly owned by Good News Church, Augusta, Georgia.

== Overflow Radio ==
WRMK started a teen oriented music program in 2009 named Overflow Radio. The program runs from 8 pm to 4 am, Friday and Saturday night weekly. Overflow Radio features the best in Christian Hip-Hop, R&B, Alternative and Rock Music. The program is an outreach of the Overflow Youth Ministry, Good News Church, Augusta, Georgia.

== See also ==
- Media in Augusta, Georgia
