= WKSP =

Radio station in Aiken, South Carolina and Augusta, Georgia

- Aiken, South Carolina; United States
- Broadcast area: Augusta, Georgia
- Frequency: 96.3 MHz (HD Radio)
- Branding: 96.3 Kiss-FM

Programming
- Format: Urban adult contemporary
- Subchannels: HD2: Country "Highwaymen Radio"; HD3: Religious "Radio by Grace"
- Affiliations: Premiere Networks

Ownership
- Owner: iHeartMedia, Inc.; (iHM Licenses, LLC)
- Sister stations: WBBQ-FM, WLUB, WPRW-FM, WYNF

History
- First air date: September 17, 1966 (as WLOW-FM at 95.9)
- Former call signs: WJFX (12/01/1984–08/02/1985); WJFX-FM (8/02/1985–11/12/1987); WRXR (11/12/1987–11/08/1999)
- Former frequencies: 95.9 MHz (1966–1986)
- Call sign meaning: W KisS P (The station's handle)

Technical information
- Licensing authority: FCC
- Facility ID: 46966
- Class: C2
- ERP: 17,500 watts
- HAAT: 258 m (846 ft)
- Translators: 104.9 W285FJ (Aiken, relays HD3); 105.3 W287CG (Augusta, Georgia, relays HD3)

Links
- Public license information: Public file; LMS
- Webcast: Listen Live; HD2: Listen Live; HD3: Listen Live
- Website: 963kissfm.iheart.com HD3: radiobygrace.com

WKSP (96.3 FM) also known as "96.3 Kiss-FM", is an urban adult contemporary radio station in Augusta, Georgia. Licensed by the Federal Communications Commission (FCC) to the nearby community of Aiken, South Carolina, the station broadcasts with an effective radiated power (ERP) of 17.5 kW. Its studios are located at the Augusta Corporate Center near the I-20/I-520 interchange in Augusta, and the transmitter tower is south of Edgefield, South Carolina.

== History ==
WKSP signed on the air initially in Kingstree SC in the late 1960s WKSP stood for We're Kingstree A Sportsmans Paradise. It was owned by the Williamsburg Country Broadcasting Corp with ownership by HY Hodges, Montague Jacobs, and Edward F Seeger. At the age of 21, Edward F. Seeger became the youngest owner/operator of a radio station in the U.S. Under Seeger's ownership, WKSP 1090 ( Kingstree, South Carolina) was recognized as the "Station of the Year" by the South Carolina Broadcasters Association and Seeger was named the Broadcaster of the Year with the prestigious Richard G Shafto Award. Williamsburg County Broadcasting sold the station to Gregory Knopp. Knopp was later convicted of trafficking in Cocaine and the FCC took the station's license and deleted the channel and frequency of 1090 which had been allocated to Kingstree SC. Following this the call letters were picked up by the owners of WPBM in Greenville SC, actually implementing those call letters in 1996.

The station signed on at 95.9 FM as WLOW-FM on September 17, 1966. Then in 1980, it changed its call letters to WPBM in and branded itself as " Z-96". In 1986, the frequency was changed from 95.9 to 96.3 as the station increased its power and moved into Augusta. The station became WRXR with an Album Oriented Rock format under the handle "96-RXR". The station kept the format for the next decade.

In the fall of 1996, WRXR flipped to Alternative rock as "96X". 96X never took off in the market in its 3 years on the air and was flipped to Urban Adult Contemporary in 1999 with the WKSP call letters. The call letters WKSP were previously assigned to station 1090 AM in Kingstree, SC which went off the air in the 1980s.

The station is owned by iHeartMedia, Inc.

== HD3 translators ==
Call sign	Frequency	City of license	FID	ERP (W)	HAAT	Class	Transmitter coordinates	FCC info
W285FJ	104.9 FM	Aiken, South Carolina	150411	92	83 m (272 ft)	D	33°33′05.5″N 81°41′50.3″W	LMS
W287CG	105.3 FM	Augusta-Richmond County, Georgia	150276	250	120 m (394 ft)	D	33°30′23.5″N 81°57′43.4″W	LMS

== See also ==
- Media in Augusta, Georgia
