= WEZO =

Radio station in Augusta, Georgia

Augusta, Georgia; United States
- Broadcast area: Augusta, Georgia
- Frequency: 1230 kHz
- Branding: 1230 The Blaze

Programming
- Format: Urban AC/Black Gospel

Ownership
- Owner: Michael Sbuttoni; (MSbuttoni, LLC)

History
- First air date: 1993 (as WCKJ)
- Former call signs: WBIA (?-1983); WCKJ (1983–1994); WKIM (1994–2004); WNRR (2004–2010)

Technical information
- Licensing authority: FCC
- Facility ID: 28610
- Class: C
- Power: 1,000 watts (unlimited)
- Transmitter coordinates: 33°27′14″N 82°1′47″W

Links
- Public license information: Public file; LMS
- Webcast: Listen Live
- Website: wezo1230am.business.site

WEZO (1230 AM, "The Blaze") is a radio station broadcasting an urban adult contemporary/Black Gospel format. Licensed to Augusta, Georgia, United States, the station is currently owned by Michael Sbuttoni, through licensee MSbuttoni, LLC.

== History ==
On March 1, 2013, the station dropped its adult standards music format for conservative talk. It is one of a few remaining individually owned and operated radio stations in the CSRA (Central Savannah River Area).

WEZO 1230 AM was previously known as iTalkUS (I Talk U.S.) due to its web presence at www.italkus.com, where tens of thousands stream the station nationally and internationally each month. It is the home of several original programs, including Talk of the Town with Doug and Renee, Powers to the People with Tony Powers and Lee Miller, Money MD, and The Spirit of Racing.

Studio lines are 706-922-9396 and 706-922-9390; both numbers spell "WEZO." Office phone is 706-364-9361.

== Former talk programming ==
The Talk of the Town with Doug and Renee aired weekday mornings from 6 to 9 am and is hosted by Renee deMedicis and Doug Allan. This "water cooler" type morning show deals with daily politics, news, and events around the CSRA with much faux pas-filled banter between the hosts as well as with guests and callers.

Powers to the People with Tony Powers airs weekday afternoons from 3 to 6 pm, and is hosted by 40 year radio veteran and self described "Conservitarian" Tony Powers. He and co-host Lee Miller, who brings a 15-year career as an award-winning journalist to the conversation, take a daily look at politics, economics, regulations, and legislation from a national perspective, highlighting America's troubling trend toward reliance on a very powerful centralized government at the federal level, and away from Constitutional limitations. The show features national pundits, political movers and shakers, as well as historians and conservative thinkers in its guest lineup.

Money MD is hosted by Steve Marbert and John Travis. "The Money Doctors" make a one-hour house call each Saturday morning at 9 am. Steve Marbert is a certified financial planner and the owner of Richard Young Associates. John Travis is a financial adviser with over 15 years experience and is the CSRA-endorsed local provider for Dave Ramsey. MoneyMD is where the listener will hear prescriptions for better financial health and how to make smart decisions with money.

The Spirit of Racing with Doug Allan takes a two-hour tour around the racing world each Saturday morning from 10 am to noon. Doug brings over 20 years as a racing photo journalist to the airwaves, where he talks about everything from NASCAR to drag boats and Indy cars to door slamming drag racing. His guests include journalists, enthusiasts, current drivers, past champions and Hall of Fame members.

== See also ==
- Media in Augusta, Georgia
