= WDRR =

Coordinates: 33.438°N 82.088°W

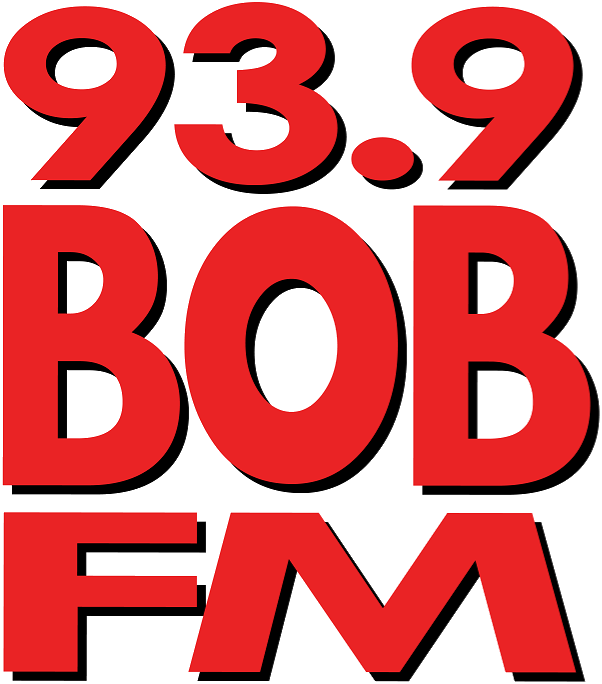
- Martinez, Georgia; United States
- Broadcast area: Augusta, Georgia
- Frequency: 93.9 MHz
- Branding: 93.9 Bob FM

Programming
- Format: Classic hits

Ownership
- Owner: Beasley Broadcast Group, Inc.; (Beasley Media Group Licenses, LLC)
- Sister stations: WGAC; WGAC-FM; WHHD; WKXC-FM

History
- First air date: 1984 (as WMTZ at 94.3)
- Former call signs: WMTZ (1984–1992); WGOR (1992–2004); WKDG (2004–2005)
- Former frequencies: 94.3 MHz (1984–1994)
- Call sign meaning: "Drive Radio"

Technical information
- Licensing authority: FCC
- Facility ID: 14667
- Class: C3
- ERP: 13,000 watts
- HAAT: 139 meters (456 ft)

Links
- Public license information: Public file; LMS
- Webcast: Listen live
- Website: ilovebobfm.com

WDRR (93.9 FM), also known as "93.9 Bob FM", is a classic hits radio station located in Augusta, Georgia. The station is licensed to the town of Martinez, Georgia by the Federal Communications Commission (FCC) and broadcasts with an effective radiated power (ERP) of 13 kW. The station is owned by Beasley Broadcast Group, Inc., through licensee Beasley Media Group, LLC. Its studios are located just two blocks from the Augusta-Richmond County border in Columbia County, Georgia and the transmitter is in Augusta proper near Fort Gordon.

== History ==
WMTZ 94.3 FM signed on in 1984 as a contemporary country outlet. In 1989, it switched formats to oldies and became "94 Gold". Slow growth in 1991 forced the station to again switch formats. This time, (hot adult contemporary) and a new moniker "Magic 94". The station became WGOR in December 1992 when Beasley Broadcasting took over and reverted with an oldies format as "Oldies 94". In 1994, WGOR upgraded its signal to 13 kW. and moved to 93.9 FM becoming "93.9 Cool FM" and later changed to "Oldies 93.9".

In 2004, WGOR moved the oldies format and call letters to the weaker 102.7 FM, becoming Oldies 102.7, while 93.9 was launched as classic country "93.9 The Bulldog" with the WKDG call-letters. Shortly after, the station was issued a C&D letter from Clear Channel Communications, which had launched WIBL several weeks previous as "105.7 The Bull" and claimed the station was infringing on its trademark. WKDG became "93.9 The Big Dog", but kept the classic country format.

In 2005, after a year where the station showed little growth, the station flipped to a rock-based classic hits format as "93.9 The Drive" under the WDRR call letters, playing rock and softer rock music from the 1970s, early 1980s and several 1960s songs, excluding motown and soul-type music typically found on an oldies station. Featured artists were The Rolling Stones, Journey, John Mellencamp, Billy Joel, America (band), and Eric Clapton. After the flip, the station gradually evolved into classic rock (eliminating the softer rock songs), and no longer used the term "Hits" in its branding, instead opting for "93.9 The Drive....Classics".

In April 2010, the station flipped to an adult hits format under the Bob FM branding. Since the change, the format has evolved to a classic hits format, using the slogan "The 80s and More". The station features primarily 1980s music along with some 1970s music and very early 1990s pop and rock music, although still using the "Bob FM" branding typically found on an adult hits station.

== See also ==
- Media in Augusta, Georgia
