= Baby J (American radio host) =

American radio host

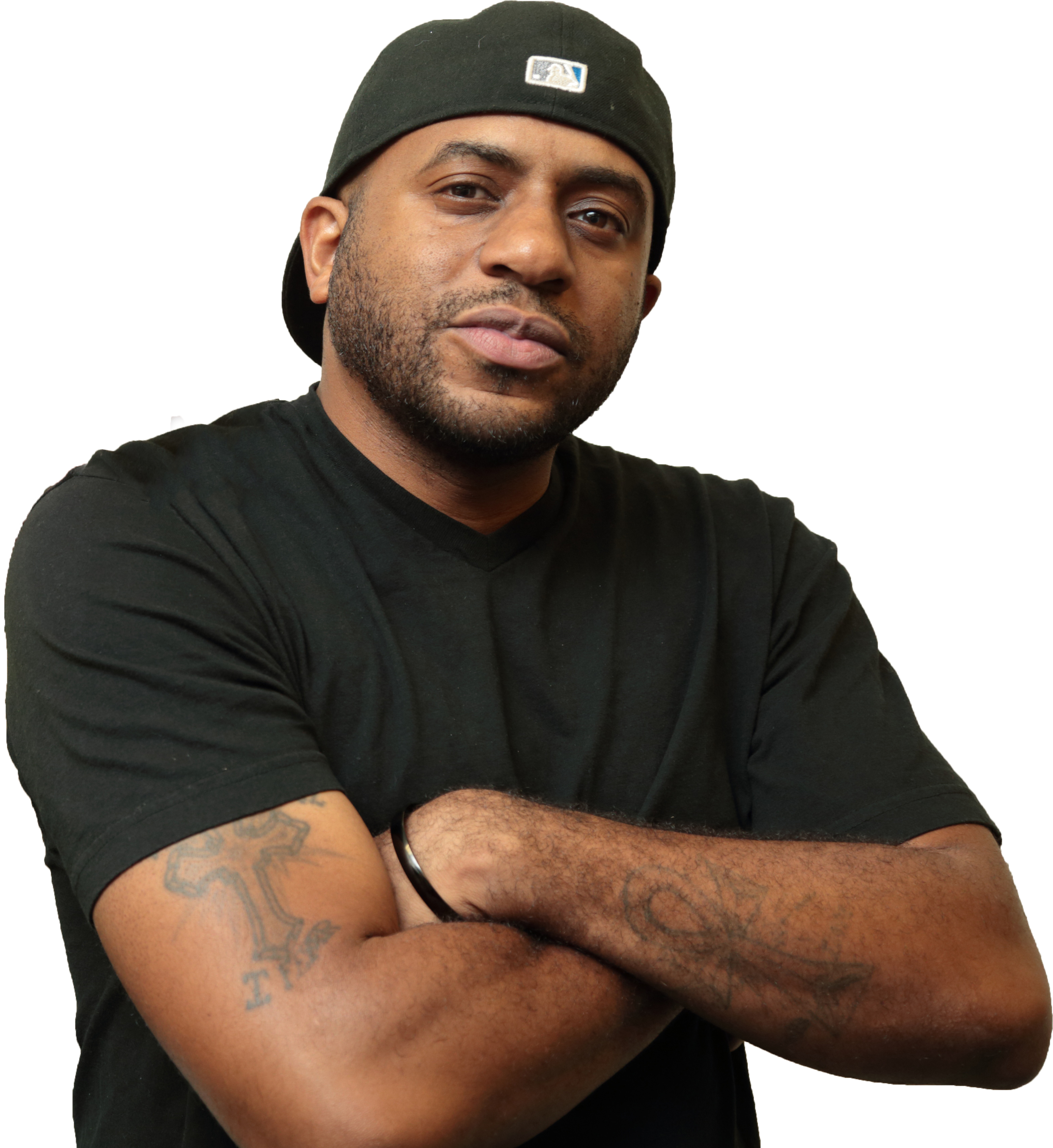
- Born: Jermaine Jones; Louisburg, North Carolina, United States
- Occupation: Program Director/Radio Personality

Jermaine Jones, better known as Baby J, is an American radio personality. He hosted Traffic Jammin' with Baby J and served as Program Director at WCHZ-FM HOT 95.5/93.1 in Augusta, Georgia.

== Radio career ==
Baby J began his radio career at WAAA-AM in Winston-Salem, North Carolina, where he hosted weekend programming featuring old school RnB. He later joined WJMH-FM 102 Jamz in Greensboro, North Carolina in 1995, hosting the overnight program Over Night Flava from 12 a.m. to 6 a.m. and producing the station’s morning show.

In 1999, Jones spoke as a panelist at the University of North Carolina at Greensboro annual seminar "Keys To A Successful Media Career." Later that year, Jones moved to WWWZ-FM Z93 Jamz in Charleston, South Carolina, where he hosted the morning program The Breakfuss Club. He also hosted the syndicated MTV Top 20 Countdown on weekends. The Breakfuss Club was syndicated in 2005 to Providence, Rhode Island, following its transfer by Citadel Broadcasting to a larger market. The program remained in Providence, Rhode Island until 2007, when it returned to Charleston, South Carolina. In 2011, Citadel Broadcasting was acquired by Cumulus Media, and the show was discontinued in November 2011. The show’s cancellation followed the acquisition and was attributed to corporate downsizing.

In December 2011, Baby J began hosting the afternoon drive at WXST-FM Star 99.7 in Charleston, South Carolina.

In early 2013, he began hosting the Wake Up Show at WFXE-FM Foxie 105 in Columbus, Georgia. In March 2014, he began hosting Afternoon Traffic Jam on weekdays from 3 to 7 p.m.

On March 16, 2015, Baby J became Program Director and host of Traffic Jammin' with Baby J, airing weekdays from 2 to 6 p.m. on WCHZ-FM HOT 95.5/93.1 in Augusta, Georgia.
