= Who Gives A Crap =

Australian toilet paper company

Good Goods Pty. Ltd
- Type: Private
- Industry: Consumer staples
- Founded: 20 December 2011; 14 years ago in Australia
- Founders: Simon Griffiths; Danny Alexander; Jehan Ratnatunga
- Key people: Simon Griffiths (CEO)
- Products: Toilet paper; Tissue paper
- Number of employees: ~100 (2020)
- Subsidiaries: Who Gives A Crap, Inc.; Who Gives A Crap Limited; Who Gives A Crap Products Inc.
- Website: whogivesacrap.org

Good Goods Pty. Ltd, trading as Who Gives A Crap (WGAC), is a brand of toilet paper, tissues, and paper towels founded in Australia, and launched in 2012. The company sells recycled and bamboo products and donates half its profits to charity. Its products are manufactured primarily in China.

== History ==
WGAC was founded by Simon Griffiths, Danny Alexander, and Jehan Ratnatunga. Griffiths had the idea for the company after learning that more than 2 billion people didn't have access to a toilet. WGAC launched in July 2012 with an Indiegogo crowdfunding campaign, for which Griffiths sat on a toilet in a warehouse for 50 hours, until the first $50,000 had been raised. The first deliveries were made in March 2013. Since launching, Who Gives A Crap has donated over $13 million to Wateraid and other sanitation charities.

By 2020, WGAC had grown to about 100 staff, and shipped products to 36 countries, with warehouses in Australia, the United Kingdom, the United States, and the Netherlands. The company began receiving investment funding in 2021, totalling around $50 million, from investors including Mike Cannon-Brookes. WGAC is a certified B Corporation, FSC certified, and ranked A in NRDC Sustainability denoting a commitment to positive social and environmental impact.

During the COVID-19 pandemic, especially in early 2020, there were numerous shortages, including of toilet paper. In March 2020, WGAC received 30-40 times the typical number of daily sales, being forced to mark their online store as 'out of stock' for a short time - a waiting list began which grew to more than 500,000 people.

On 7 November 2026, WGAC revealed that hackers had accessed its customers personal information through an external marketing software provider. The data accessed included names, email addresses, phone numbers, and mailing addresses. They said that passwords and payment information was not accessed. The breach happened on 30 October. The provider realised the next day, and WGAC was informed on 6 November, letting customers know of the breach the next day.

== Products ==
WGAC toilet paper is created from recycled paper, and each roll is also individually wrapped in recycled paper. Since 2016, WGAC also sells toilet paper created from bamboo. Its toilet paper products are manufactured in China, the United States, and the United Kingdom.

The company added garbage bags, food waste bags and dog poo bags to its product line in October 2024.

== Charitable donations and partnerships ==
Half of the company's profits are donated to charities including WaterAid, WaterSHED, and Shining Hope for Communities. By 2024, WGAC had donated more than $13 million AUD, with $6 million USD resulting from the company's sales spike during 2020 pandemic shortages.

By 2025, the company had donated £10m for projects such as Kenyan waterless toilets and toilets in Timorese schools.

In March 2025, the company ended its partnership with influencer Lauren Dubois, due to differing views on the Gaza genocide. In May the same year, the company partnered with grocer Erewhon to create limited edition "C.R.A.P" digestive smoothies.
