= WJBF =

Television station in Augusta, Georgia, United States

- Augusta, Georgia; United States
- Channels: Digital: 28 (UHF); Virtual: 6
- Branding: WJBF NewsChannel 6; WJBF CW 6 (6.2)

Programming
- Affiliations: 6.1: ABC; 6.2: CW+; for others, see § Subchannels

Ownership
- Owner: Nexstar Media Group; (Nexstar Media Inc.)

History
- First air date: November 26, 1953
- Former call signs: WJBF-TV (1953–1954)
- Former channel numbers: Analog: 6 (VHF, 1953–2009); Digital: 42 (UHF, 1999–2020)
- Former affiliations: NBC (primary 1953–1967, secondary 1967–1974); CBS (secondary, 1953–1954); DuMont (secondary, 1953–1956)
- Call sign meaning: John Brooks Fuqua (founder of the station)

Technical information
- Licensing authority: FCC
- Facility ID: 27140
- ERP: 755 kW
- HAAT: 504.4 m (1,655 ft)
- Transmitter coordinates: 33°24′20.7″N 81°50′0.5″W

Links
- Public license information: Public file; LMS
- Website: www.wjbf.com

WJBF (channel 6) is a television station in Augusta, Georgia, United States, affiliated with ABC and The CW Plus. The station is owned by Nexstar Media Group. WJBF's studios are located in Television Park, near the Augusta Mall in Augusta, and its transmitter is located in Beech Island, South Carolina.

== History ==
WJBF-TV began operations on November 26, 1953, as Augusta's first television station. The station was founded by the Georgia-Carolina Broadcasting Company, the broadcasting arm of local entrepreneur J. B. Fuqua, who also owned NBC Radio Network affiliate WJBF (1230 AM). WJBF-TV was a primary NBC affiliate, but picked up programs from CBS, ABC and DuMont on a secondary basis. Sister station WJBF radio was sold by Fuqua in 1954 (it is now WEZO). It lost CBS only three months later when WRDW-TV (channel 12) signed on.

On September 1, 1967, WJBF became a primary ABC affiliate. The move relegated NBC to a shared secondary affiliation with WRDW-TV. This was an unusual situation for a then two-station market, especially one as small as Augusta. ABC, as the smallest and weakest of the big three networks, would not be on nearly the same footing with CBS and NBC until the 1970s, when most markets of Augusta's size grew large enough to support three full network affiliates. However, fellow NBC affiliate WIS-TV in Columbia provided at least grade B coverage to the South Carolina side of the market. In contrast, no full-time ABC affiliate put even a grade B signal into the area. Fuqua reasoned that if channel 6 took a primary ABC affiliation, it wouldn't have significant out-of-market competition. Additionally, in 1966 Fuqua bought two full-time ABC affiliates, WTVW in Evansville, Indiana, and KTHI-TV (now KVLY-TV) in Fargo, North Dakota, and apparently wanted to get his other stations—WJBF and KTVE in El Dorado, Arkansas—in line with the new acquisitions. In 1969, Fuqua branched out into the movie theater business when he purchased Martin Theaters of Georgia, forerunner of Carmike Cinemas. At the time, Martin Theaters of Georgia itself also owned WTVM in Columbus, Georgia, and WTVC in Chattanooga, Tennessee, also ABC affiliates. Those were added to Fuqua's portfolio.

When WATU (channel 26, later WAGT) began operations in December 1968, conventional wisdom suggested that it would become a full NBC affiliate. However, since many Augusta viewers still didn't have UHF-capable sets, NBC allowed WJBF and WRDW-TV to continue to cherry-pick most of its stronger programs. For its part, WJBF kept airing both the Today Show and The Tonight Show, which preempted ABC's The Dick Cavett Show among others. WATU was thus saddled with NBC's weaker programs, a major factor in the station going dark in 1970. When WATU returned to the air in 1974 as a full-time NBC affiliate, WJBF was forced to drop NBC programming once and for all, per an FCC order issued in 1971 that required VHF stations in markets with three or more commercial outlets to affiliate with only one network.

Fuqua began breaking up his business empire in 1980. His television stations were among the first assets to be sold, with WJBF and WTVM going to Missoula, Montana–based Western Broadcasting Company., and WTVC going to the A. H. Belo Corporation of Dallas, Texas. In 1984, Western sold its broadcast holdings to the SFN Companies, then-parent of educational publisher Scott, Foresman and Company. In 1986, SFN was sold to Pegasus Broadcasting, a new firm formed by members of SFN's management. Pegasus quickly became part of GE Capital in 1990. Spartan Radiocasting of Spartanburg, South Carolina purchased the station in 1992. Spartan was renamed Spartan Communications in 1995. Spartan merged with Media General in 2000.

WJBF replaced RTV with MeTV on digital subchannel 6.2 on September 26, 2011, as part of a groupwide affiliation agreement with Media General; the channel replaced RTV on some Media General-owned stations in other market.

=== Augusta West, management of WAGT ===
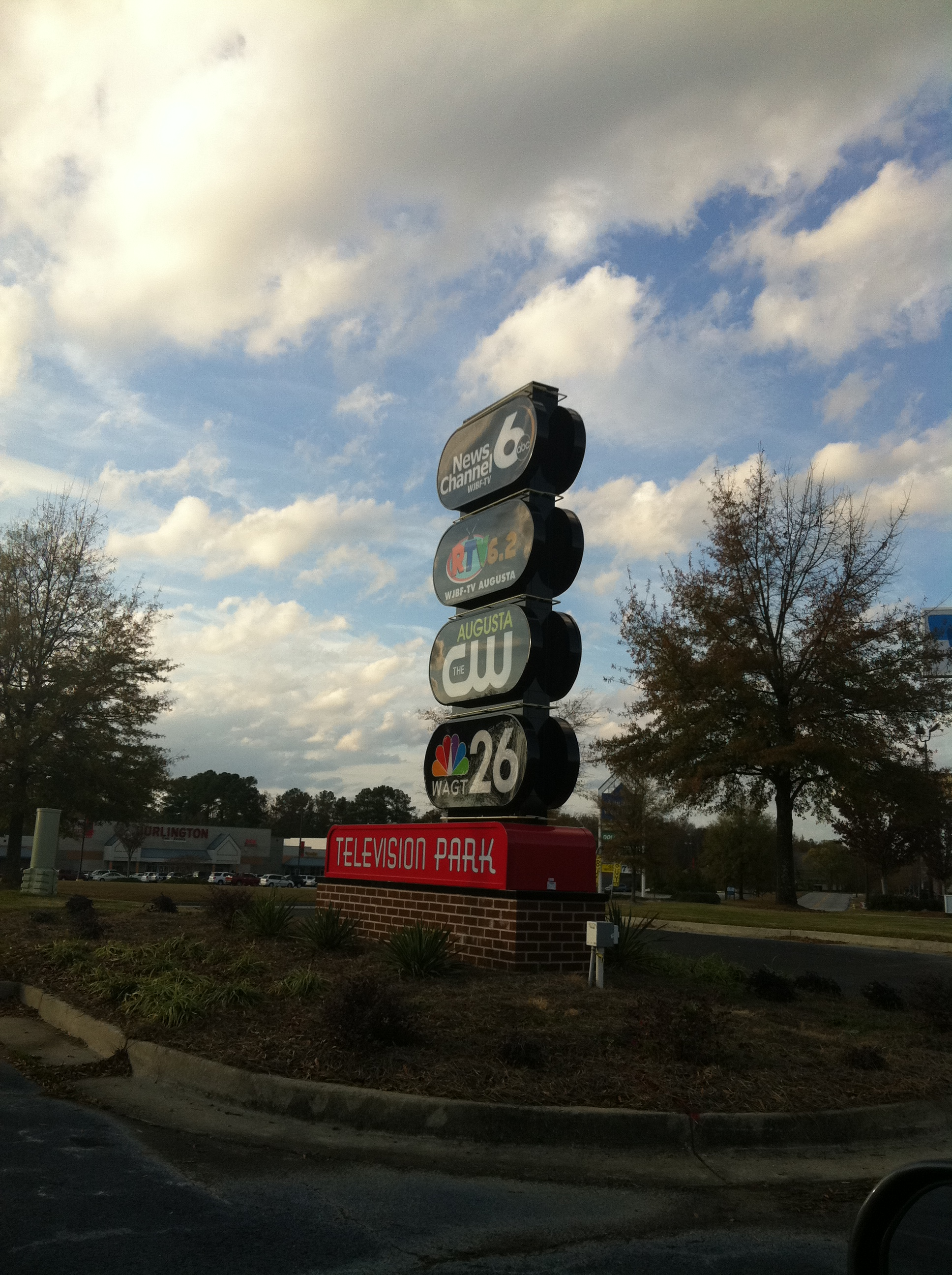
The exterior of the new Television Park at Augusta West.

In October 2009, Schurz Communications announced that it would enter into joint sales and shared services agreements with WJBF, meaning that WAGT's news operation and advertising sales department would be taken over by Media General. Most of WAGT's managerial staff were dismissed, and other employees were reassigned to different positions.

Media General had initially intended to move WAGT into an expanded wing of the WJBF building in downtown Augusta. Both WJBF and WAGT have had a longstanding presence in the downtown area. Channel 6's facility on Reynolds Street was built around 1956, and channel 26 moved into its Broad Street building, a converted theatre, in 1981. However, it soon became apparent that WJBF's facility could not sustain the expansion necessary to house both stations. Media General instead chose to remodel what had been a big-box store to contain the stations. The new facility, located at the Augusta West Shopping Center in a former Barnes & Noble retail location, was opened in October 2011. While the two stations shared some internal services, WAGT's news operation and sales department operated autonomously from that of WJBF, and the two stations also produced competing news programming from their dedicated areas of the facility.

The SSA was disbanded on February 16, 2016, after the acquisition of WAGT by Gray Television, owner of WRDW-TV. Gray accused Media General of "[refusing] to agree to a smooth transition of personnel [from WAGT]" and not allowing them to move along to the station's new owner, as they fell under the employment of WJBF due to the shared services agreement. On February 26, 2016, an injunction was granted against Gray by Media General, claiming that Gray violated the SSA by unwinding it following its purchase of WAGT. The agreement was to last through 2020, and stipulated that all future owners of the station would remain subject to it.

== Local programming ==
Since 1954, WJBF has produced and aired the Sunday morning gospel music program Parade of Quartets, one of the longest-running local programs of any kind on American television. The program has been a showcase for regionally and nationally known African-American gospel performers, and has also featured appearances from political and social figures. Augusta native James Brown, Shirley Caesar, Al Green, the Mighty Clouds of Joy, Dorothy Norwood and Jesse Jackson are among those who have appeared on the program.

The station also produces an urban music video program, Power Hitz, which airs on Sunday evenings. Power Hitz has been on the air since 2001.

From 1954 until 1992, WJBF produced and aired a Sunday afternoon Southern gospel program featuring the locally based Lewis Family, known as the "First Family of Bluegrass Gospel", that was seen in other markets via syndication. After the weekly series ended, WJBF continued to produce and air a yearly Christmas special until the group's retirement in 2009.

=== News operation ===
As of May 2021, WJBF presently broadcasts 35 hours of locally produced newscasts each week (with 6 1/2 hours on weekdays, 2 1/2 hours on Saturdays, and two hours on Sundays).

Appropriately for being the first television station in the area, WJBF has led the ratings for most of its history, with rival WRDW-TV usually the runner-up. In recent years, WJBF and WRDW-TV had usually traded first and second place, while WAGT almost always placed third.

In the 1980s, its newscasts were branded NewsWatch 6. After being acquired by Spartan Radiocasting in 1992, WJBF and some other stations acquired by the company changed their branding to NewsChannel. This station and most of its sister affiliates still use this branding today after being acquired by Media General. However, long after Spartan bought the station, WJBF retained the "groovy 6" logo it had used in one form or another since the late 1970s. This changed in 2002, when it adopted the "arc" logo used by most Media General stations.

In the 1990s, WJBF reached an agreement with the Augusta Mall to run a closed-circuit "Mall TV" feed on television screens throughout the mall featuring the day's news and coverage of some local special events. WJBF operated this service until the late-1990s. They also had a local agreement with Comcast to air a rebroadcast of the 6 p.m. show on the cable provider's channel 66. This arrangement ended in 2004 with the launch of a nightly 10 o'clock newscast on Fox affiliate WFXG (channel 54). The production uses different graphics and duratrans concealing the WJBF logos. The launch came after its studios were renovated.

In December 2009, WAGT and WJBF partnered under a shared services agreement, with WJBF producing WAGT's news, sales, and other programming.

On October 17, 2011, WJBF launched local newscasts in high definition starting with the morning newscast. It is the third station in the area to do so behind WFXG and WRDW-TV.

== Subchannels ==
The station's signal is multiplexed:

Subchannels of WJBF
| Subchannel | Res. | Short name | Programming |
|---|---|---|---|
| 6.1 | 1080i | WJBF-HD | ABC |
| 6.2 | 720p | CW | The CW Plus |
| 6.3 | 480i | ANT-TV | Antenna TV |
| 6.4 | 480i | ION | Ion Television |
