= WRDW-TV =

Television station in Augusta, Georgia, United States

- Augusta, Georgia; United States
- Channels: Digital: 12 (VHF); Virtual: 12
- Branding: News 12

Programming
- Affiliations: 12.1: CBS; 12.2: Independent with MyNetworkTV; for others, see § Subchannels

Ownership
- Owner: Gray Media; (Gray Television Licensee, LLC)
- Sister stations: WGAT-LD, WAGT-CD

History
- First air date: February 8, 1954
- Former channel numbers: Analog: 12 (VHF, 1954–2009); Digital: 31 (UHF, 2004–2009)
- Former affiliations: ABC (secondary, 1954–1967); NBC (secondary 1967–1974); UPN (12.2, 2004–2006); MyNetworkTV (12.2 2006–2019; 12.3 2019–2024)
- Call sign meaning: "Where Radio Does Wonders" (derived from former sister station WRDW radio)

Technical information
- Licensing authority: FCC
- Facility ID: 73937
- ERP: 20.2 kW
- HAAT: 485 m (1,591 ft)
- Transmitter coordinates: 33°24′37″N 81°50′36″W
- Translator(s): W16EL-D; W20EW-D; W33ER-D; W35DV-D

Links
- Public license information: Public file; LMS
- Website: www.wrdw.com

WRDW-TV (channel 12) is a television station in Augusta, Georgia, United States, affiliated with CBS and MyNetworkTV. It is owned by Gray Media alongside low-power Telemundo affiliate WGAT-LD (channel 17) and Class A NBC affiliate WAGT-CD (channel 26). The three stations share studios at The Village at Riverwatch development in Augusta; WRDW-TV's transmitter is located in Beech Island, South Carolina.

== History ==
WRDW-TV commenced operations in February 1954; it is the second-oldest television station in Augusta. The station was originally owned by Radio Augusta, the parent company of the original WRDW radio (1480 AM, later WCHZ and now defunct). WRDW-TV has been Augusta's CBS affiliate for its entire history, owing to its radio sister's long affiliation with the CBS Radio Network. However, it shared ABC with then-primary NBC affiliate WJBF (channel 6).

In 1956, Radio Augusta was sold to the Morris family and their company, Southeastern Newspapers, publishers of the Augusta Chronicle.

On September 1, 1967, WJBF switched its primary affiliation to ABC, and began splitting NBC with WRDW-TV. This was very unusual for a two-station market, especially one as small as Augusta. However, WJBF's namesake owner, J. B. Fuqua, wanted to get that station in line with two ABC affiliates he had just purchased, WTVW in Evansville, Indiana, and KTHI-TV (now KVLY-TV) in Fargo, North Dakota.

When WATU (channel 26, later WAGT) appeared as the market's third station in late 1968, NBC allowed WRDW-TV and WJBF to keep their secondary NBC affiliations because of WATU's painfully weak signal. This situation mostly shut WATU out of access to network programming, thereby forcing it to go dark in 1970. Channel 12 continued to split NBC with WJBF until WATU resumed broadcasting in 1974 with a primary NBC affiliation. WATU's return forced channel 12 to drop NBC programming for good, per a 1971 FCC order that required VHF stations in markets with three or more commercial outlets to affiliate with only one network.

In 1960, the Morrises exited Augusta broadcasting, with channel 12 being sold to what would eventually become Rust Craft Broadcasting. (Channel 12 and 1480 AM continued to share the WRDW call letters until the early 1980s, when the radio station was sold by entertainer and Augusta native James Brown; it later became WCHZ). Magazine publisher Ziff-Davis purchased Rust Craft in 1979. Channel 12 was sold along with then-sister stations WEYI-TV in Saginaw, Michigan, WROC-TV in Rochester, New York, WRCB-TV in Chattanooga, Tennessee, and WTOV-TV in Steubenville, Ohio, to Television Station Partners, a group composed of Ziff Davis's broadcast executives, in 1983. Television Station Partners sold off all of its stations in early January 1996, with WRDW going to Gray Communications Systems (now Gray Media).

Ever since CBS began broadcasting the Masters Tournament in 1956, WRDW has been the de facto flagship station of the annual golf tournament played at Augusta National Golf Club.

On July 12, 2018, WRDW broke ground on a new building to replace its facility on Georgia Avenue in North Augusta, South Carolina, where it had been based since its inception. The new 30,000-square-foot (2,800 m^{2}) facility houses operations for both WRDW and WAGT, and opened in February 2021. As a nod to Augusta National and the Masters, the new facility also features a putting green.

== Programming ==
Unlike most Gray-owned CBS stations, WRDW-TV does not carry the entire CBS schedule; the station does not carry the entirety of CBS' weekday overnight lineup—it carries the CBS News Roundup but does not clear the network's broadcast of the CBS Morning News; as a result, the latter program does not air in the Augusta market.

=== News operation ===
Until Gray Television purchased WRDW, the station had been a solid runner-up to longtime leader WJBF. In the mid-1990s, WRDW began a steady ratings growth to overcome WJBF in several newscasts. The two stations remain the market's fiercest competitors with WAGT and WFXG trailing far behind the two leaders.

WRDW has been recognized numerous times for its journalism, particularly in the areas of investigative, documentary, and breaking news. Over the past 16 years, WRDW has received 15 Regional Murrow Awards, 2 National Murrow Awards, a National Sigma Delta Chi Award, and dozens of honors from the Georgia Associated Press and Georgia Association of Broadcasters.

On January 24, 2011, WRDW launched local newscasts in high definition with the midday newscast. It is the first station in the area to do so. With the launch came a brand new logo and brand new high definition graphics, similar in style to the previous 16:9 enhanced definition widescreen graphics that debuted just 4 months before, but fully animated.

WRDW-TV had the longest-running news anchor team in the market with Richard Rogers and Laurie Ott seen weeknights at 6 and 11. The two were together on-air from the mid-1990s until September 2007 when Laurie Ott left to pursue other career opportunities. For much of the last 25 years, WRDW did not offer a newscast weeknights at 5:30, opting instead to carry Inside Edition. Starting in September 2017, WRDW launched a nationally focused 5:30 p.m. newscast; while Inside Edition moved to WAGT weeknights at 6.

From March 2016 to September 2017, all of WRDW's newscasts with the exception of the midday newscast were simulcast by WAGT; the station also produced exclusive 5:30 p.m. and 7 p.m. newscasts for WAGT, broadcast from a separate news set with different anchors.

WAGT's 5:30 p.m. newscast was scrapped in September 2017 for a 30-minute 4 p.m. newscast. In addition, the 6 p.m. newscast is no longer simulcasted on WAGT and all newscasts outside the 4 p.m. and 7 p.m. are branded News 12. While WAGT's 7 p.m. newscast continues to maintain different anchors and set, the 4 p.m. utilizes a virtual set and is anchored by WRDW's Richard Rogers. Periodically, WRDW uses the main set and main anchors for the WAGT newscasts in the event that WAGT's 7 p.m. anchor Kelly Wiley is out.

== Technical information ==
=== Subchannels ===
The station's signal is multiplexed:

Subchannels of WRDW-TV
| Subchannel | Res. | Short name | Programming |
|---|---|---|---|
| 12.1 | 1080i | WRDW-DT | CBS |
| 12.2 | 1080i | MyNet | Independent with MyNetworkTV |
| 12.3 | 480i | METV | MeTV |
| 12.4 | 480i | The365 | 365BLK |
| 12.5 | 480i | TruCrim | True Crime Network |
| 12.6 | 480i | ION+ | Ion Plus |
| 12.7 | 480i | COZI | Cozi TV |

By spring 2017, WRDW-DT2 upgraded its over-the-air digital signal into 1080i high definition; thus offering over-the-air access to the high definition feed for MyNetworkTV for the first time in the Augusta market.

=== Analog-to-digital conversion ===
WRDW-TV turned off its analog signal, over VHF channel 12, on June 12, 2009. The station then changed its pre-transition UHF channel 31 to VHF channel 12.
