= WCHZ-FM =

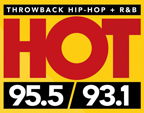
- Warrenton, Georgia; United States
- Broadcast area: Greater Augusta
- Frequency: 93.1 MHz (HD Radio)
- Branding: Hot 95.5/93.1

Programming
- Format: Classic hip hop

Ownership
- Owner: Beasley Media Group; (Beasley Media Group Licenses, LLC)

History
- First air date: August 4, 1997; 28 years ago (as WRFN)
- Last air date: January 2024; 2 years ago
- Former call signs: WRFN (1997–2003); WGAC-FM (2003–2011)
- Call sign meaning: Former "Channel Z" branding for the current WGAC-FM

Technical information
- Licensing authority: FCC
- Facility ID: 17129
- Class: A
- ERP: 4,100 watts
- HAAT: 122 meters (400 ft)
- Transmitter coordinates: 33°29′59.9″N 82°37′8.5″W
- Translator: WHHD-HD2: 95.5 W238AU (Augusta)
- Repeater: 98.3 WHHD-HD2 (Clearwater, South Carolina)

Links
- Public license information: Public file; LMS
- Webcast: Listen live
- Website: www.hotaugusta.com

WCHZ-FM (93.1 MHz, "Hot 95.5/93.1") was a commercial radio station broadcasting a classic hip hop format. It was licensed to Warrenton, Georgia, and served Greater Augusta. The station went by the name "Hot 95.5/93.1" and was owned by Beasley Media Group, with studios on Jimmie Dyess Parkway in Augusta.

== History ==
The station signed on the air on August 4, 1997. It launched as WRFN, a sports radio station owned by Beard Broadcasting alongside sister AM sports station, WRDW. Beasley Broadcasting purchased both stations in 1999. On October 3, 2003, the station changed its call sign to WGAC-FM, simulcasting news/talk WGAC (580 AM).

On August 10, 2011, WGAC-FM's news/talk format moved to 95.1 FM, licensed to Harlem, Georgia, swapping frequencies with rock-formatted WCHZ; the stations also swapped call signs five days later. The move also shifted WCHZ to the AM dial as a simulcast on 1480 AM, displacing WGUS, although WGUS-FM continued to broadcast on its 102.7 FM signal. Due to the new frequency's poor coverage of the Augusta market with 93.1 and inadequate sound quality on the AM dial, Beasley Broadcasting began broadcasting 95 Rock on a broadcast translator with 250 watts at 95.5 FM to better cover the city of Augusta and surrounding towns on January 16, 2012. In 2014, the station switched to simulcasting WGUS-FM, as 93.1 and 102.7 WGUS. The 250 watt translator at 95.5 continued to simulcast WCHZ (AM).

On January 21, 2015, WCHZ-FM dropped the simulcast of WGUS-FM, and began simulcasting WHHD-HD2, and WCHZ (AM), branded as "Hot 95.5/93.1" with a classic hip-hop format. Beasley Media surrendered WCHZ (AM)'s license to the Federal Communications Commission (FCC) on February 5, 2015; the FCC cancelled the license the same day.

The station's program director was Jay "Baby J" Jones and could be heard weekday afternoons during "Traffic Jammin' with Baby J".

WCHZ-FM went silent in January 2024 following the sale of its tower; it never returned to the air and did not respond to an FCC inquiry, leading to the loss of its license in June 2025. The "Hot" programming continues on WHHD-HD2 and W249EF (97.7 FM) as "Hot 97.7".
