= WIIZ =

- Blackville, South Carolina; United States
- Broadcast area: Barnwell, South Carolina; Augusta, Georgia
- Frequency: 97.9 MHz
- Branding: The Wiz 97.9

Programming
- Format: Mainstream urban

Ownership
- Owner: Nicwild Communications, Inc.

History
- First air date: April 16, 1993
- Former call signs: WAAN (1993–1995)

Technical information
- Licensing authority: FCC
- Facility ID: 15307
- Class: C2
- ERP: 50,000 watts
- HAAT: 132 meters (433 ft)
- Transmitter coordinates: 33°6′52.00″N 81°23′13.00″W

Links
- Public license information: Public file; LMS
- Website: wiizfm.com

WIIZ (97.9 FM) is a commercial radio station licensed to Blackville, South Carolina, United States, and serving the Barnwell and Augusta, Georgia, regions. Owned by Nicwild Communications, Inc., the station features a mainstream urban format as "The Wiz 97.9". Studios for WIIZ are located on Marlboro Avenue in Barnwell, and the transmitter is in Kline, South Carolina.

== History ==
The station signed on the air on April 16, 1993. The original call sign was WAAN.

In October, 1995, the station switched its call letters to the current WIIZ-FM. Despite having the new call sign, the station waited until April 1, 1996, to debut its WIZ format. The first two personalities were Bobby Nichols and Yo' Girl D.L.(Priscilla Annette Gray).

== See also ==
- Media in Augusta, Georgia
