= WFAM =

- Augusta, Georgia; United States
- Broadcast area: Augusta metropolitan area
- Frequency: 1050 kHz

Programming
- Format: Christian radio

Ownership
- Owner: Wilkins Communications Network; (J.J. & B. Broadcasting, Inc.)

History
- First air date: March 10, 1952
- Former call signs: WAUG (1952–1978); WHGI (1978–1985); WIGL (1985–1986)
- Call sign meaning: Family

Technical information
- Licensing authority: FCC
- Facility ID: 20595
- Class: D
- Power: 5,000 watts (day); 82 watts (night)
- Transmitter coordinates: 33°27′20.5″N 81°56′18.4″W

Links
- Public license information: Public file; LMS
- Webcast: Listen live
- Website: www.wilkinsradio.com/our-stations/wfam-1050am-98-9fm-augusta-ga

WFAM (1050 AM) is a commercial radio station licensed to Augusta, Georgia, United States. It has a Christian radio format and is owned by the Wilkins Communications Network.

The transmitter is on Laney Walker Boulevard at Hayes Drive.

== History ==
The station signed on the air on March 10, 1952. Its original call sign was WAUG. It was a daytimer station, required to go off the air at night. The following year, WAUG was joined by a sister station, WAUG-FM 105.7. The two stations were owned by the Garden City Broadcasting Company, with studios in the Bon Air Hotel.

It has been a Christian radio station since the early 1970s. The station also became an affiliate of the ABC Information Network in the 1970s.

In 1978, the station's call letters became WHGI, in 1985 the call sign switched to WIGL and in 1986, to WFAM.

== See also ==
- Media in Augusta, Georgia
