= WHHD =

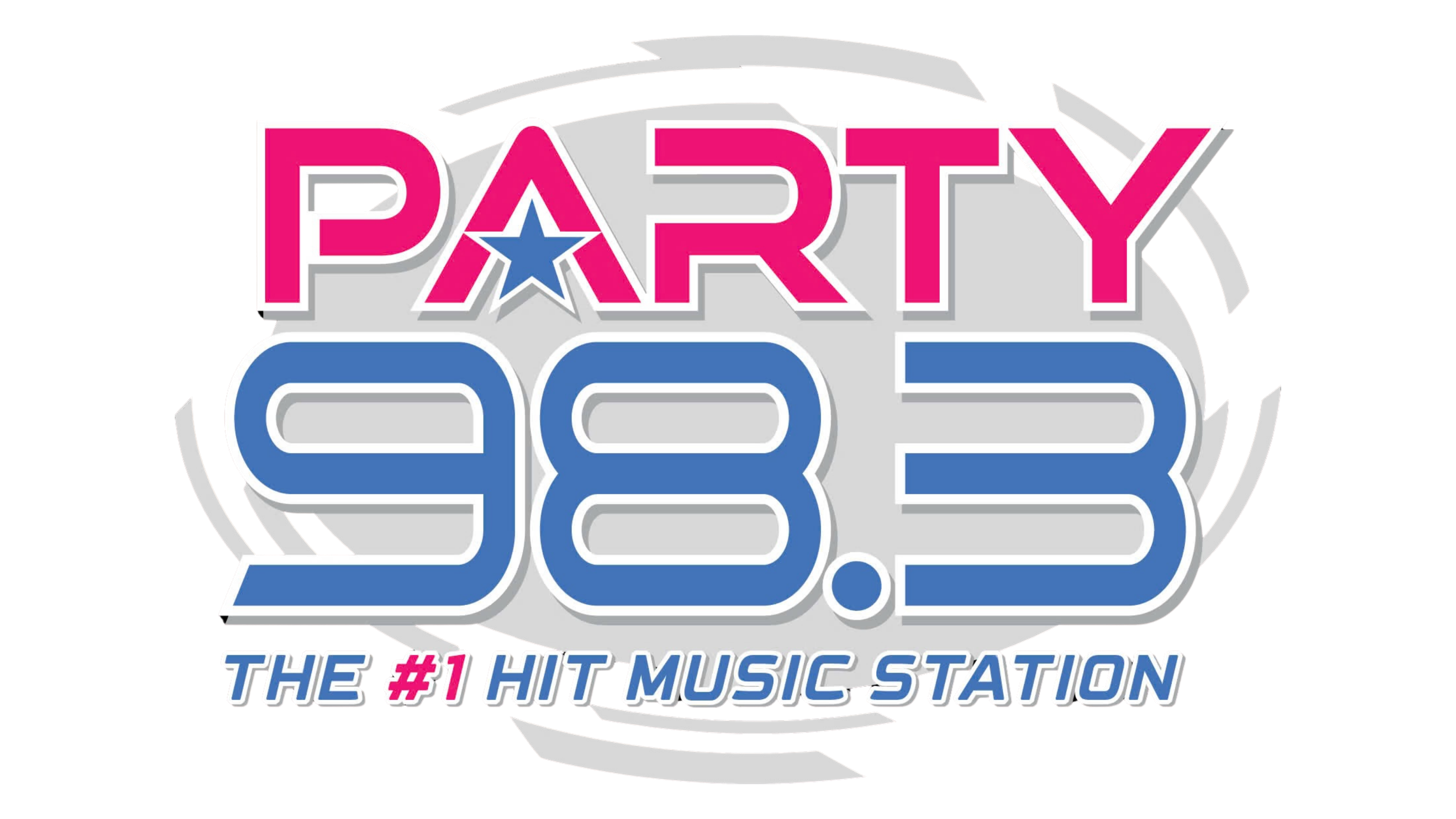
- Clearwater, South Carolina; United States
- Broadcast area: Augusta, Georgia
- Frequency: 98.3 MHz (HD Radio)
- Branding: Party 98.3

Programming
- Format: Top 40 (CHR)
- Subchannels: HD2: Classic hip hop "Hot 97.7"
- Affiliations: Premiere Networks; Westwood One

Ownership
- Owner: Beasley Broadcast Group, Inc.; (Beasley Media Group Licenses, LLC)
- Sister stations: WDRR; WGAC; WGAC-FM; WKXC-FM

History
- First air date: April 1987 (as WCNA)
- Former call signs: WCNA (1987–1993); WSLT (1993–2006)

Technical information
- Licensing authority: FCC
- Facility ID: 24148
- Class: C3
- ERP: 11,500 watts
- HAAT: 148 meters (486 ft)
- Transmitter coordinates: 33°30′44.5″N 82°4′47.4″W
- Translator: HD2: 97.7 W249EF (Augusta)

Links
- Public license information: Public file; LMS
- Webcast: Listen live (high); Listen live (low); Listen live (player)
- Website: party983.com hotaugusta.com (HD2)

WHHD (98.3 FM) is a top 40 (CHR) station serving the Augusta, Georgia metro area. It is owned by Beasley Broadcast Group, Inc., through licensee Beasley Media Group Licenses, LLC, and is licensed by the Federal Communications Commission (FCC) to Clearwater, South Carolina to broadcast with an effective radiated power (ERP) of 11.5 kW. Its studios are located just two blocks from the Augusta-Richmond County border in unincorporated Columbia County, Georgia, and the transmitter is in Martinez, Georgia. It is the only Top 40 formatted station in the Augusta market.

== History ==
The station signed on as WCNA in April 1987 with an easy listening format. It became WSLT in 1993 with an adult contemporary format under the handle "Lite 98.3".

In February 2006, the station dropped the AC format and aired a loop of a brief snippet of Gorillaz's "Feel Good Inc." (the laughing heard in the beginning and end of the song) nonstop for 24 hours. When the stunt ended, "HD98.3" was born with a CHR format, filling the void left when the former WZNY flipped to country as WIBL a little more than a year previous.

Former logo as “HD98.3” (c. 2015)

On July 3, 2026, after stunting with music from Taylor Swift since July 1, WHHD changed its name to “Party 98.3” while keeping its CHR format. The first song as "Party" was "I Gotta Feeling" by the Black Eyed Peas. The station launched commercial free for the following July 4th weekend.

== HD Radio ==
WHHD's second HD Radio channel carries a classic hip hop format, which is branded as "Hot 97.7" in reflection of its simulcast on FM translator W249EF (97.7). The format launched in January 2015 on WCHZ (1480 AM), W238AU (95.5 FM), and WCHZ-FM (93.1) as "Hot 95.5/93.1"; it remained on WCHZ-FM until January 2024, and moved from 95.5 to 97.7 by 2025.

Broadcast translator for WHHD-HD2
| Call sign | Frequency | City of license | FID | ERP (W) | HAAT | Class | Transmitter coordinates | FCC info |
|---|---|---|---|---|---|---|---|---|
| W249EF | 97.7 FM | Augusta, Georgia | 151831 | 250 | 148.4 m (487 ft) | D | 33°30′44″N 82°4′47″W | LMS |

== See also ==
- Media in Augusta, Georgia
