= WAGT-CD =

Television station in Augusta, Georgia, United States

- Augusta, Georgia; United States
- Channels: Digital: 30 (UHF); Virtual: 26
- Branding: News 26

Programming
- Affiliations: 26.1: NBC; for others, see § Subchannels

Ownership
- Owner: Gray Media; (Gray Television Licensee, LLC)
- Sister stations: WRDW-TV, WGAT-LD

History
- Founded: March 28, 1985
- Former call signs: W67BE (1985–1995); WBEK-LP (1995–2001); WBEK-CA (2001–2015); WBEK-CD (May–October 2015); WRDW-CD (2015–2016)
- Former channel numbers: Analog: 67 (UHF, 1987–2001), 16 (UHF, 2001–2015); Digital: 16 (2015–2017)
- Former affiliations: Independent (1985–1986, 1991–1995); Fox (1986–1991); The WB (1995–1998); UPN (1998–2004); America One (2004–2015); Youtoo America (2015–2017); The CW Plus (CD2, until 2024)
- Call sign meaning: Augusta's Great Television (taken from WAGT)

Technical information
- Licensing authority: FCC
- Facility ID: 3369
- Class: CD
- ERP: 15 kW
- HAAT: 483 m (1,585 ft)
- Transmitter coordinates: 33°24′20.7″N 81°50′0.5″W

Links
- Public license information: Public file; LMS

WAGT-CD (channel 26) is a low-power, Class A television station in Augusta, Georgia, United States, affiliated with NBC. It is owned by Gray Media alongside low-power Telemundo affiliate WGAT-LD (channel 17) and dual CBS/MyNetworkTV affiliate WRDW-TV (channel 12). The three stations share studios at The Village at Riverwatch development in Augusta; WAGT-CD's transmitter is located in Beech Island, South Carolina.

Due to its low-power status, WAGT-CD's footprint is smaller than those of the other stations in the market. It relies heavily on cable and satellite for its viewership.

== History ==
=== WAGT intellectual unit ===
Until 2017, the WAGT call sign, virtual channel 26 assignment, and NBC affiliation were associated with a full-power UHF station that signed on in 1968 as WATU, Augusta's third commercial station. It nominally took the NBC affiliation, but was unable to gain much headway in the market. Its VHF rivals, primary ABC affiliate WJBF (channel 6) and primary CBS affiliate WRDW-TV (channel 12) continued to cherry-pick NBC's stronger programming. The Federal Communications Commission (FCC) had only mandated all-channel tuning in 1964, and most Augusta residents had not bought UHF-capable sets. The station went dark in 1970. A year later, the FCC ruled that stations with three or more commercial outlets could only be affiliated with one network. This cleared the way for WATU to return in 1974 as a full NBC affiliate. However, it saw little change in its fortunes even after Schurz Communications bought it in 1981 and changed the call letters to WAGT. For most of its history, it was the weakest major-network affiliate in Augusta, essentially the third station in a two-station market. Even during NBC's ratings dominance in the 1980s and 1990s, it was one of the weakest NBC affiliates in the country. Notably, it did not air regular newscasts until 1995.

In 2009, Schurz placed WAGT into a joint sales and shared services agreement with Media General, owner of WJBF, with WJBF as senior partner. The combined operation was housed in a new facility at Augusta West.

=== Current WAGT-CD license ===
The license for W67BE (the call letters reflected its original location on UHF channel 67) was first granted on March 28, 1985. It was Augusta's first independent station, airing a collection of public domain black-and-white western movies, infomercials and programming such as Sewing with Nancy (unusual as that program was mainly offered for public television). It later became Augusta's first Fox affiliate before the emergence of WFXG (channel 54) in 1991. The station would eventually re-make itself, and on January 2, 1995, the station became WBEK-LP; nine days later, it became an affiliate of The WB upon the network's launch. During this period, the station was known locally as "The WB on WBEK 67".

In 1998, WBAU, a local affiliate of The WB 100+ Station Group, signed on, appearing on cable systems in the Augusta area; as a result, WBEK lost its WB affiliation. The station then became an affiliate of UPN, and for a few years sold advertising on WBAU, before these rights went to WRDW-TV (channel 12; this changed hands once more before The WB 100+ was replaced with The CW Plus). In 2001, WBEK moved to a new channel location, channel 16, and obtained Class A status (modifying its call sign to WBEK-CA).

After the affiliation switch, the station attempted to maintain its status as a "top" local affiliate. The station's move to channel 16 had come with a loss in power, and viewership began to decline. The station picked up a secondary affiliation with America One during this period. In 2004, the station lost the UPN affiliation to WRDW's digital subchannel 31.2 ("UPN Augusta"), and continued on with America One programming to very little viewer interest. In 2015, the station converted to digital broadcasting and became WBEK-CD. That same year, America One and cable network Youtoo TV merged to become Youtoo America.

On August 27, 2015, longtime owner AVN agreed to sell WBEK-CD to Gray Television, owner of WRDW-TV, for $550,000. The sale did not include the station's existing cable carriage on Comcast or the WBEK call letters; Gray thus applied to change the station's call letters to WRDW-CD. The sale was completed on October 27, 2015, at which time the call sign change to WRDW-CD took effect.

In September 2015, Gray announced its purchase of the television properties of Schurz Communications, including WAGT. Gray proposed to merge the two stations' operations at WRDW's facilities (replacing a previous shared services agreement with Media General), and offer WAGT's broadcast spectrum during the FCC's upcoming spectrum reallocation auction. Gray could not legally retain both WRDW and WAGT. Not only do FCC rules bar one entity to own two of the four highest-rated stations in a market, but Augusta had only five full-power stations—not enough to legally permit a duopoly in any event. To solve the problem, Gray had proposed a waiver in which it would shut down WAGT upon closure of the deal. In January 2016, Gray requested special temporary authority to immediately move WRDW-CD to WAGT's operating facility, which would have its power reduced for the low-power parameters of WRDW-CD. As it would cause interference, Gray stated that WAGT would simultaneously discontinue its full-power signal, essentially replacing it with WRDW-CD. This request implied that Gray intended to transfer the WAGT intellectual unit (programming, NBC affiliation and staff) to the low-power signal upon the completion of its purchase, as low-power stations are not subject to FCC duopoly rules. On February 1, 2016, the station's call letters changed to WAGT-CD.

The FCC approved the sale of Schurz's television properties to Gray on February 12, 2016, and approved Gray's waiver for the duopoly restrictions concerning WRDW and WAGT. However, it ordered Gray to continue operating WAGT through the auction. Gray went on with its plans to end the SSA and JSA with Media General. In response, Media General sought an injunction restricting removal of the JSA or sale of the station after accusing Gray of violating the agreement. The injunction was granted, only to be struck down by the Supreme Court of Georgia on March 23, 2016. At the auction, Gray sold WAGT's broadcast spectrum for $40,763,036. The FCC stated that WAGT would not share spectrum with another channel, and would instead go off the air.

On May 31, 2017, Gray Television returned WAGT's full-power license to the FCC. WAGT-CD then moved to WAGT's former operating facilities, dropped Yootoo America programming, and took over WAGT's intellectual property, talent, NBC affiliation, and syndicated programming. The change was implemented in a way that did not require most over-the-air viewers to rescan their sets in order to keep watching the station. On-air operations remained unchanged. Gray estimated that only five percent of WAGT's over-the-air audience lost access to NBC with the move to low power.

Initially, the combined operation was housed at WRDW's studios on Georgia Avenue in North Augusta, South Carolina. In 2021, the stations moved to a new studio in Augusta's Riverwatch development. In a nod to Augusta National Golf Club, the new studio features a putting green.

== Subchannels ==
The station's signal is multiplexed:

Subchannels of WAGT-CD
Subchannel	Res.	Short name	Programming
26.1	1080i	WAGTCD	NBC
26.2	720p	PSN	Peachtree Sports Network
26.3	480i	Outlaw	Outlaw
26.4	480i	DABL	Dabl
26.5	480i	HandI	Heroes & Icons
26.6	480i	StartTV	Start TV

== See also ==
- Media in Augusta, Georgia
