= WAGT (TV) =

Television station in Augusta, Georgia, United States (1968–2017)

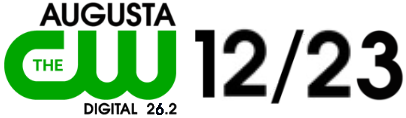
- Augusta, Georgia; United States

Programming
- Affiliations: NBC (1968–1970, 1974–2017); Dark (1970–1974); The CW via The CW Plus (26.2, 2006–2017)

Ownership
- Owner: Augusta Telecasters Inc. (1968–1980); Schurz Communications (1980–2016); Gray Television (2016–2017)

History
- First air date: December 24, 1968
- Last air date: May 31, 2017
- Former call signs: WATU-TV (1968–1981)
- Former channel numbers: Analog: 26 (UHF, 1968–2009); Digital: 30 (UHF, 2001–2017); Virtual: 26 (2001–2017)
- Call sign meaning: Augusta's Great Television

Technical information
- Facility ID: 70699

WAGT (channel 26) was a television station in Augusta, Georgia, United States, that served as an NBC affiliate from December 1968 until May 2017.

WAGT ceased operations as a result of the Federal Communications Commission (FCC)'s 2017 spectrum incentive auction. Its intellectual property, programming and NBC affiliation moved to WAGT-CD, a low-power station which was purchased by Gray Television.

== History ==
The station began operations on December 24, 1968, as WATU-TV, the third television station in Augusta. Dr. Harold W. Twisdale, a dentist from Charlotte, North Carolina, and Washington, D.C.–based engineer David L. Steel were the leaders of the original ownership group, operating as Augusta Telecasters Inc. The Twisdale/Steel group, which had interests in other planned stations (WCTU-TV in Charlotte being the only one of their other interests to make it to air), was granted a construction permit for the Augusta outlet in late 1967. On paper, the new channel 26 became Augusta's NBC affiliate. Unfortunately, the station became one of numerous UHF start-ups of that era that failed to obtain a foothold against long-established VHF competition.

Ever since WJBF (channel 6) had dropped its primary NBC affiliation in favor of a full ABC affiliation in September 1967, NBC had been relegated to off-hour clearances on WJBF and CBS affiliate WRDW-TV (channel 12). Even after WATU signed on, NBC allowed WJBF and WRDW-TV to cherry-pick its stronger shows, most likely because most Augusta-area viewers still did not have UHF-capable sets (the Federal Communications Commission had only mandated all-channel tuning in 1964). WATU was thus left with most of NBC's news programming, as well as lower-rated entertainment shows. During this time, it was not unusual for tape-delayed NBC programs to air on both WJBF and WRDW between 7 and 7:30 p.m. before the respective networks' prime time feeds began for the evening. WJBF also aired the Today Show and WRDW-TV ran The Tonight Show. Another problem for channel 26 came from WIS-TV in Columbia, which provided at least "Grade B" coverage on VHF channel 10 to most of the South Carolina side of the Augusta market and aired the full NBC schedule. In a market that was just barely large enough to support three full network affiliates, WATU-TV was unable to make any headway, and went dark on November 9, 1970.

Similar situations occurred in two other Southern markets that were "intermixed" with one UHF and two VHF channels. At the same time WATU was shut down, the owners of NBC station WRDU-TV (now WRDC) in Durham, North Carolina, petitioned the Federal Communications Commission for help in its battle against then-CBS affiliate WTVD, which had been cherry-picking NBC programs for several years. In 1971 the FCC ruled that VHF stations in markets with three or more commercial outlets could be affiliated with only one network. This forced WTVD and, by extension, WAPI-TV (now WVTM-TV) in Birmingham to choose between one of the networks; WTVD ultimately chose CBS full-time while WAPI-TV went with NBC. Though this decision was too late to save WATU's first incarnation, a precedent was set which allowed the station to return to the airwaves. Channel 26 returned to the air on January 11, 1974 with a full NBC affiliation. As a result of that FCC decree, WATU's return forced WJBF and WRDW to drop NBC programming once and for all. Still, the station continued to struggle under the handicap of a fairly weak UHF signal.

The Twisdale/Steel group sold WATU to local businessmen J. Thomas Jones and Francis Robertson, in 1978. Jones and Robertson, in turn, sold the station to South Bend, Indiana–based Schurz Communications in 1980. The new owners changed the station's call letters to WAGT on July 7, 1981, and for much of the next decade, the station used the on-air branding 26 Power. Even during a very prosperous period for NBC as a whole, WAGT remained essentially the third station in a two-station market. It not only had to compete against WJBF and WRDW, but also had to contend with Columbia's WIS-TV, one of the strongest NBC affiliates in the nation. Until the arrival of cable in the market in the early 1980s, many Augusta-area viewers actually got a stronger signal from WIS, even though channel 10's transmitter was located almost 100 miles (160 km) from the South Carolina–Georgia line. The growing penetration of cable mitigated the signal problem somewhat. Even then, WAGT still lost many potential viewers to WIS, which remained on many area cable systems (including Augusta itself) well into the 21st century.

=== Under Media General ===
In October 2009, Schurz and WJBF's then-owner, Media General, announced that the two would enter into joint sales and shared services agreements in January 2010, with WJBF as senior partner. This resulted in the two stations combining news operations, advertising sales, and other operational services, with Schurz remaining responsible for programming and the maintaining of FCC regulations. Most of WAGT's managerial staff were dismissed and other employees were reassigned to different positions.

Media General had initially intended to move WAGT into an expanded wing of WJBF's studios on Reynolds Street in downtown Augusta. However, that facility, built in 1956, was unable to sustain the expansion needed to house both stations. Media General instead chose to renovate a former Barnes & Noble store at Augusta West to serve as a joint headquarters for both stations. The new facility was expected to be completed by April 2011, but was ultimately pushed back until October.

=== Acquisition by Gray, Media General lawsuit ===
WAGT's last logo under Schurz Communications ownership and Media General's SSA/JSA.

On September 14, 2015, Schurz announced that it would sell its broadcasting assets to Gray Television, owner of WRDW-TV. Gray announced that it would merge the two stations' operations and offer WAGT's broadcast spectrum during the FCC's upcoming spectrum incentive auction. Under normal conditions, Gray would not be able to own both stations. Not only were they the four highest-rated stations in the Augusta market, but Augusta only had five full-power stations—not enough to legally permit a duopoly in any case. Gray requested a waiver of the FCC's duopoly rules to own the two stations temporarily until the completion of the auction later in 2016, but proposed to shut down WAGT entirely upon closure of the acquisition so it would not technically be operating more than one of the top four stations in the market. In January 2016, Gray filed for special temporary authority for WAGT to shut down its full-power signal so it could be replaced on the same technical facilities and UHF channel 30 by a recently acquired low-power station, WRDW-CD. Presumably, Gray planned to move NBC programming to WRDW-CD after the completion of the sale.

The FCC approved the sale and Gray's waiver to the duopoly rules on February 12, 2016. However, the FCC ordered Gray to continue operating WAGT separately until the auction was complete, and not enter into any joint sales arrangements with WRDW or any other station. Upon the closing of the deal on February 16, 2016, Gray took control of WAGT; the Media General-produced newscasts were replaced by simulcasts of WRDW's newscasts. The same day, Gray issued a statement accusing WJBF of "[refusing] to agree to a smooth transition of personnel [from WAGT]", as WAGT's employees were employed by Media General due to the SSA. Media General, however, accused Gray of violating the shared services and joint sales agreements between WAGT and WJBF; the agreements, which lasted through 2020, stipulated that any future owner of WAGT had to maintain the agreements with WJBF. Media General believed that Gray was attempting to back out of the agreements by means of the spectrum auction.

On February 26, 2016, a preliminary injunction was granted against Gray in the Richmond County Superior Court, which required that Media General re-assume control of WAGT, and prohibited Gray from selling WAGT in the spectrum incentive auction. Gray attempted to block the injunction, claiming that the agreements with Media General made it impossible to comply with the conditions prohibiting WAGT from partaking in joint sales agreements following Gray's purchase of the station. However, Gray's request was denied. At the same time, the Media General-controlled WAGT website was re-activated, and began to produce online-only newscasts using WAGT's news staff. On March 7, 2016, Media General re-assumed control of WAGT, pending hearings on March 10, 2016.

On March 10, 2016, the FCC disclosed that it had begun an investigation into Media General's attempts to retain control of WAGT; the investigation explored the possibility of initiating a license revocation hearing under Section 312 of the Communications Act. Deputy General Counsel David Gossett argued that "by seeking and obtaining the injunctive provision forbidding Gray to contribute the WAGT license in the upcoming FCC incentive auction, Media General has also violated Section 310(d) of the Communications Act. That section requires advance approval by the Commission for any assignment or transfer of control of a broadcast license. The Commission has long taken the view that it is a violation of Section 310(d) for a company (here, Media General) to seek injunctive relief that interferes with a licensee's ultimate control of a station." The Justice Department also declared an interest in the case. The next day, Gray admitted that they were about to launch separate news productions for WAGT, but that they were unable to do so because of the injunction.

On March 23, 2016, the Supreme Court of Georgia struck down the injunction without addressing the litigation, allowing Gray to re-assume control of the station. WRDW general manager John Ray stated that Media General was now cooperating with Gray to smoothly transition WAGT back to its own control. As previously planned, Gray launched a separate news production for WAGT after it re-assumed control of the station. As a result of its conduct, the FCC fined Media General $700,000.

In the auction, WAGT's broadcast spectrum was sold for $40,763,036. The FCC stated that WAGT planned to go off-air, and not share spectrum with another channel. Gray had indicated on the station's website that WAGT-CD (which had changed its calls from WRDW-CD on February 1, 2016) would assume the channel 26 designation and its subchannels on May 31, 2017, when the full-power WAGT license was returned to the FCC. The change was implemented in a way that did not require most over-the-air viewers to rescan their sets in order to keep watching NBC. The FCC license was canceled the next day.

== News operation ==
For at least the first quarter of a century on the air, WAGT aired virtually no local newscasts apart from brief news and weather cut-ins during Today on weekday mornings and the early evenings and late evenings on weeknights. On September 21, 1995, the station finally established its first ever news department with broadcasts under the name 26 News. Initially included in the launch was a nightly show at 11. Soon after, a nightly newscast at 6 and a weekday morning show were added to the schedule.

The latter program was expanded in June 2003 to a full two-hours (from 5 until 7) in the morning resulting in WAGT being the first outlet in the market to make such a launch. In addition, there was also a thirty-minute news and lifestyle show weekdays at noon called Top 'o the Day. Although that program would eventually be dropped, the station added a new midday newscast at 11 on September 10, 2007, that aired for a half-hour.

For the most part over the years, WAGT was a distant third place among Augusta's big three affiliates. The station changed its branding several times in attempts to improve ratings and increase viewership by adopting variations including 26 Action News. It finally re-branded in 2003 as WAGT News. Between 2003 and 2005, Action News was completely phased out along with the "3D Weather" (a.k.a. "3 Degree Guarantee") weather segments. In 2005, its newscasts were branded as NBC 26 News phasing out the call letters "WAGT" in most but not all station graphics and logos. This was due to the fact that the graphics package produced by Television By Design was less than a year old and still carried the WAGT News moniker. Along with this re-brand came other changes such as updates to the studio set, graphics package, and the regional Doppler weather radar.

After WJBF renovated its studios in 2004, the station entered into a news share agreement with Fox affiliate WFXG (then owned by Southeastern Media Holdings and operated by Raycom Media). The outsourcing arrangement resulted in a nightly prime time newscast to debut on that station. Known as Fox 54 News at 10, the thirty-minute program originated from WJBF's studios on Reynolds Street in Downtown Augusta. The broadcast featured different on-air graphics and modified WJBF's existing set with separate duratrans in order to conceal WJBF's logo. The principal look of the set and on-air graphics for Fox 54 News at 10 remained the same from the newscast's launch and always used Gari Media Group's "The X Package" as its music theme.

Meanwhile, WAGT decided to establish its own weeknight prime time newscast at 10 in 2004 to offer an alternative against WFXG's effort. The production launched a few days after that outlet's show and was initially seen on Class A independent station WBEK-CA (ironically Augusta's original Fox station, and now WAGT-CD) through a similar outsourcing agreement. Known as WBEK 16 News at 10, this program was soon canceled due to low ratings and inconsistent viewership. The broadcast was unable to directly compete against WFXG's news because that broadcast was very successful in the time slot from its start.

After being retooled, WAGT's weeknight prime time newscast was relaunched on "WBAU" and became known as WB 23 News at 10. With that station's September 2006 affiliation switch to The CW, WAGT renamed the broadcast CW Augusta Now and tailored its format towards a younger audience as was the case with the newly formed network. On April 23, 2007, in an attempt to boost its continual anemic ratings, WAGT decided to drop the CW Augusta Now title and its fast-paced format replacing it with a more traditional newscast. However, NBC Augusta News at 10 was still unable to mount a strong challenge and alternative to WFXG's newscast so it was canceled in April 2008.

Following a national trend among television stations, WAGT's continual third-place ranking and low advertising sales resulted in Schurz Communications handing over daily operations to Media General and rival WJBF. The ABC outlet continued producing WFXG's Fox 54 News at 10 despite the operational agreements with WAGT. As a result, some reporters and video footage from this station began to be seen on WFXG. In January 2010, WAGT dropped its weekday midday show and added a weeknight newscast at 7 that was seen for a half-hour. This show was the market's only local broadcast seen in the time slot.

Although physical operations of WAGT and WJBF remained based at their respective facilities for the time being, later plans called for the station to move into expanded space at WJBF's studios on Reynolds Street. Media General ultimately decided to construct a new combined facility at the Augusta West Shopping Center in a former Barnes & Noble bookstore. The new facility was designed to allow the two stations to maintain autonomous, competing news operations, with separate studios, newsrooms, on-air personalities, and sales departments for each station. However, some content sharing occurred between the two stations.

In July 2011, WFXG announced that it would move its 10 p.m. newscast in-house later in the year, in cooperation with other Raycom Media stations. In turn, WJBF launched a new 10 p.m. newscast on WAGT-DT2.

Upon Gray's resumption of control over WAGT on March 28, 2016, new in-house 5:30 and 7 p.m. newscasts premiered to replace the Media General-produced newscasts. They were produced from a separate set with alternate anchors to differentiate them from WRDW's newscasts. All other newscasts carried by WAGT were simulcasts from WRDW.

== Subchannels ==
The station's signal was multiplexed:

Subchannels of WAGT
Subchannel	Res.	Short name	Programming
26.1	1080i	WAGT-DT	NBC
26.2	720p	CW	The CW Plus
