= WGAC-FM =

News/talk radio station in Harlem–Augusta, Georgia

Coordinates: 33°29′7.4″N 82°12′6.4″W

Simulcasts WGAC (AM) Augusta
- Harlem, Georgia; United States
- Broadcast area: Augusta, Georgia
- Frequency: 95.1 MHz (HD Radio)
- Branding: NewsTalk WGAC

Programming
- Format: News/talk
- Affiliations: Fox News Radio; Premiere Networks; Westwood One

Ownership
- Owner: Beasley Broadcast Group; (Beasley Media Group Licenses, LLC)
- Sister stations: WDRR; WGAC; WHHD; WKXC-FM

History
- First air date: November 1992 (as WCHZ)
- Former call signs: WHEY (1991–1992); WCHZ (1992–2011)

Technical information
- Licensing authority: FCC
- Facility ID: 24423
- Class: C3
- ERP: 5,700 watts
- HAAT: 164 meters (538 ft)

Links
- Public license information: Public file; LMS
- Webcast: Listen live
- Website: www.wgac.com

WGAC-FM (95.1 MHz) is a radio station located in Augusta, Georgia. The station is licensed by the Federal Communications Commission (FCC) to the town of Harlem and broadcast on with an effective radiated power (ERP) of 5.7 kW. It simulcasts a news/talk format with WGAC (580 AM). Its studios are located just two blocks from the Augusta-Richmond County border in unincorporated Columbia County, Georgia and the transmitter is in Grovetown, Georgia, at the interchange of Interstate 20 and Georgia State Route 388.

== History ==
WGAC-FM signed on in November 1992 as an alternative rock outlet named "Channel Z 95.1", giving the area its first station playing that type of music. Although the station had a small but loyal audience, it was handicapped with a signal that covered 2/3 of the Augusta/Aiken market. It was nominated in 1996 for "Small Market Station Of The Year" as well as then-Music Director Johnny Cage for "Music Director Of The Year" by Billboard Radio Monitor and was voted "Best Radio Station" in 1995 and 1996 by readers of "Augusta Magazine".

The "Channel Z" era of WGAC-FM from 1992 to 1996 has been referred to as the "purest form of rock ‘n’ roll to be found anywhere on Augusta airwaves." That era has been memorialized on the Channel Z 95.1 Preservation Project website.

The station signed a local marketing agreement with Beasley Broadcasting (who later purchased it) on December 10, 1996, and the format was flipped to 1970s oldies as "Z95". After about a year with mostly dismal ratings, the station flipped to active rock as "95 Rock" in September 1998.

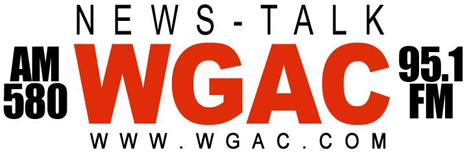
Previous logo

On August 10, 2011, WCHZ's rock format moved to 93.1 WGAC-FM, a much lower powered signal licensed to Warrenton, Georgia, moving the FM simulcast of WGAC's talk format from 93.1 to the stronger 95.1 facility. Five days later, WCHZ and WGAC-FM swapped call signs.

== See also ==
- Media in Augusta, Georgia
