= WKXC-FM =

- Aiken, South Carolina; United States
- Broadcast area: Augusta metropolitan area
- Frequency: 99.5 MHz (HD Radio)
- Branding: Kicks 99

Programming
- Format: Country
- Subchannels: HD2: Nutune Country (Country)

Ownership
- Owner: Beasley Broadcast Group, Inc.; (Beasley Media Group Licenses, LLC)
- Sister stations: WDRR; WGAC; WGAC-FM; WHHD

History
- First air date: August 1966 (as WAKN-FM at 99.3)
- Former call signs: WAKN-FM (1966–1974); WNEZ (1974–1988)
- Former frequencies: 99.3 MHz (1966–1988)
- Call sign meaning: "Kicks"

Technical information
- Licensing authority: FCC
- Facility ID: 24147
- Class: C2
- ERP: 24,000 watts
- HAAT: 217 meters (712 ft)
- Transmitter coordinates: 33°38′44.5″N 81°55′44.4″W

Links
- Public license information: Public file; LMS
- Webcast: Listen live
- Website: www.kicks99.com

WKXC-FM (99.5 MHz) is a commercial FM radio station licensed to Aiken, South Carolina, and serving the Augusta metropolitan area. The station carries a country music radio format and is owned by the Beasley Broadcast Group. The radio studios and offices are on Jimmie Dyess Parkway in Augusta.

WKXC-FM has an effective radiated power (ERP) of 24,000 watts. The transmitter is off Jacob McKee Road in Trenton, South Carolina.

== History ==
In August 1966, the station signed on as WAKN-FM. It broadcast on 99.3 MHz and was powered at only 3,000 watts, a fraction of its current output. At first it simulcast its sister station, WAKN (990 AM, now dark). The two stations played Top 40 music.

In 1974, WAKN-FM changed call sign to WNEZ ("Nice and Easy") with a beautiful music and easy listening format. Through much of the 1970s and 1980s, it played quarter hour sweeps of mostly instrumental cover versions of popular songs as well as Broadway and Hollywood show tunes.

Over time, the audience for easy listening music began to age and was less attractive to advertisers. In the summer of 1988, WNEZ changed to country music as WKXC-FM under the "Kicks 99.5" moniker.

== See also ==
- Media in Augusta, Georgia
