= WNRR =

Radio station in North Augusta, South Carolina

- North Augusta, South Carolina; United States
- Broadcast area: Augusta metropolitan area
- Frequency: 1380 kHz
- Branding: WNRR Gospel 1380

Programming
- Format: Silent

Ownership
- Owner: Eternity Media Group, LLC

History
- First air date: 1958
- Former call signs: WGUS (1958–2003); WPCH (2003–2006); WYNF (2006–2010); WSGF (2010)
- Former frequencies: 1600 kHz (1958–1960)

Technical information
- Licensing authority: FCC
- Facility ID: 72467
- Class: D
- Power: 4,000 watts (day); 70 watts (night)
- Transmitter coordinates: 33°29′17″N 81°56′46″W

Links
- Public license information: Public file; LMS
- Webcast: Listen live
- Website: wnrrgospel.com

WNRR (1380 AM) is a commercial radio station licensed to North Augusta, South Carolina, and serving the Augusta metropolitan area, including sections of South Carolina and Georgia. It is owned by the Eternity Media Group and airs an urban gospel radio format.

WNRR logo before 93.3 simulcast in November 2019.

WNRR signed on in 1958. And in April 2026 WNRR is Going Silent.

== See also ==
- Media in Augusta, Georgia
