= WGAC (AM) =

Augusta, Georgia; United States
- Broadcast area: Augusta metropolitan area
- Frequency: 580 kHz
- Branding: NewsTalk WGAC

Programming
- Format: News/talk
- Affiliations: Fox News Radio; Premiere Networks; Westwood One

Ownership
- Owner: Beasley Broadcast Group, Inc.; (Beasley Media Group Licenses, LLC)
- Sister stations: WDRR; WGAC-FM; WHHD; WKXC-FM

History
- First air date: 1940

Technical information
- Licensing authority: FCC
- Facility ID: 4435
- Class: B
- Power: 5,000 watts day; 840 watts night
- Transmitter coordinates: 33°40′44.5″N 82°4′47.4″W (day); 33°31′29.5″N 81°54′30.4″W (night)
- Repeater: 95.1 WGAC-FM (Harlem)

Links
- Public license information: Public file; LMS
- Webcast: Listen live
- Website: www.wgac.com

WGAC (580 kHz) is a commercial AM radio station in Augusta, Georgia. The station carries a news/talk format simulcast with co-owned 95.1 WGAC-FM in Harlem, Georgia. The stations are owned by Beasley Broadcast Group, Inc., through licensee Beasley Media Group Licenses, LLC. The radio studios and offices are on Jimmie Dyess Parkway in Augusta.

WGAC is a rare radio station that uses transmitter sites in different states. In the daytime, WGAC is powered at 5,000 watts, using a non-directional antenna off King Street in Martinez, Georgia. At night, to avoid interfering with other stations on 580 AM, WGAC reduces power to 840 watts, using a directional antenna with a four-tower array, off Old Sudlow Lake Road in North Augusta, South Carolina.

== Programming ==
On weekdays, WGAC has local shows in AM and PM drive time, with nationally syndicated shows heard the rest of the day. Weekdays begin with "Augusta's Morning News" with John Patrick, Mary Liz Nolan and Steve Smith. In late afternoons, Austin Rhodes hosts a conservative talk call-in show. Also on the schedule are Glenn Beck, Dave Ramsey, Mark Levin, Coast to Coast AM with George Noory and America in the Morning with John Trout.

Weekends feature shows on money, gardening, golfing, cars, technology, religion and law. Syndicated weekend shows include Kim Komando, The Motley Fool, Handel on the Law and Somewhere in Time with Art Bell as well as repeats of weekday shows. WGAC broadcasts games of the Augusta GreenJackets minor league baseball team. Most hours begin with world and national news from Fox News Radio.

== History ==
In 1940, WGAC signed on the air. It originally broadcast on 1210 kHz at 250 watts, a fraction of its current power. It was owned by Twin States Broadcasting. WGAC was an NBC Blue Network affiliate, carrying its schedule of dramas, comedies, news, sports, soap operas, game shows and big band broadcasts during the "Golden Age of Radio".

In 1941, after the enactment of the North American Regional Broadcasting Agreement (NARBA), WGAC moved to AM 1240. A few years later, WGAC got approval from the Federal Communications Commission (FCC) to move to 580 kHz, with a big increase in power, 5,000 watts by day and 1,000 watts at night. The Blue Network became the ABC Radio Network.

In 1978, the Beasley Broadcast Group acquired WGAC and later, added an FM station (WGAC-FM 95.1) as a simulcast.

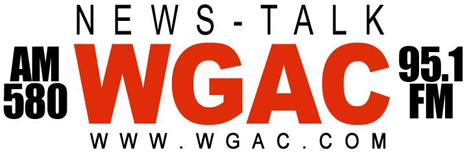
Previous logo

== See also ==
- Media in Augusta, Georgia
