= WRDW (AM) =

Radio station in Augusta, Georgia (1998–2019)

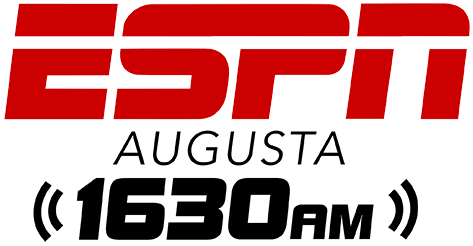

Augusta, Georgia; United States
- Frequency: 1630 kHz

Programming
- Format: Defunct

Ownership
- Owner: Beasley Broadcast Group; (Beasley Media Group Licenses, LLC)

History
- First air date: January 9, 1998 (as WAWX)
- Last air date: April 11, 2019
- Former call signs: WAWX (1998–2001); WTEL (2001–2003)
- Call sign meaning: "Where Radio Does Wonders" (carried over from the former WRDW)

Technical information
- Facility ID: 87174
- Class: B
- Power: 10,000 watts day; 1,000 watts night
- Transmitter coordinates: 33°31′0″N 82°0′36″W

WRDW (1630 AM) was a radio station licensed to Augusta, Georgia, United States. The station was owned by Beasley Broadcast Group.

== History ==
WRDW originated as the expanded band "twin" to the original WRDW. On March 17, 1997, the Federal Communications Commission (FCC) announced that eighty-eight stations had been given permission to move to newly available "Expanded Band" transmitting frequencies, ranging from 1610 to 1700 kHz, with the then-WRDW (later WCHZ) in Augusta authorized to move from 1480 to 1630 kHz. Initially issued the call sign WAWX, in 2003 the expanded band authorization, also in Augusta, inherited the historic WRDW call letters.

The FCC's initial policy was that both the original station and its expanded band counterpart could operate simultaneously for up to five years, after which owners would have to turn in one of the two licenses, depending on whether they preferred the new assignment or elected to remain on the original frequency, although this deadline was extended multiple times. Ultimately Beasley Media surrendered WCHZ's license on 1480 kHz to the FCC on February 5, 2015, which cancelled the license on the same day.

=== Later history ===
On April 11, 2019, WRDW went silent (off the air), due to its transmitter site having been sold. Its license was surrendered September 27, 2019, and cancelled by the FCC on February 13, 2020.

== See also ==
- Media in Augusta, Georgia
