= WLUB =

American radio station in Augusta, Georgia

- Augusta, Georgia; United States
- Broadcast area: Augusta, Georgia
- Frequency: 105.7 MHz (HD Radio)
- Branding: 105.7 The Bull

Programming
- Format: Country
- Subchannels: HD2: Eagle 106.3 (classic rock)

Ownership
- Owner: iHeartMedia, Inc.; (iHM Licenses, LLC)
- Sister stations: WBBQ-FM; WKSP; WPRW-FM; WYNF

History
- First air date: March 10, 1952 (as WAUG-FM)
- Former call signs: WAUG-FM (1952–1980); WYMX (1980–1984); WFMG (1984–1985); WZNY (1985–1986); WLTO (1986); WZNY (1986–2004); WIBL (2004–2007); WEKL (2007–2013); WSCG (2013–2016)
- Call sign meaning: "Bull" spelled backwards

Technical information
- Licensing authority: FCC
- Facility ID: 59250
- Class: C0
- ERP: 100,000 watts
- HAAT: 371 m (1,217 ft)
- Translator: HD2: 106.3 W292EE (Augusta-Richmond County)

Links
- Public license information: Public file; LMS
- Webcast: Listen live (via iHeartRadio); HD2: Listen live (via iHeartRadio)
- Website: bull1057.iheart.com; HD2: eagle1063.iheart.com

WLUB (105.7 MHz) is a commercial FM radio station licensed to Augusta, Georgia. The station is owned by iHeartMedia, Inc. and airs a country music radio format. WLUB calls itself "105.7 The Bull". As with many country stations owned by iHeart, WLUB carries the nationally syndicated Bobby Bones Show from Nashville on weekday mornings.

The station is licensed by the Federal Communications Commission (FCC) to broadcast with an effective radiated power (ERP) of 100 kW from an antenna 371 meters (1217 feet) in height above average terrain (HAAT), giving it a wide coverage area, reaching Columbia, South Carolina, to the northeast and nearly to Athens, Georgia, to the west. WLUB's studios are located at the Augusta Corporate Center near the I-20/I-520 interchange in Augusta, and the transmitter tower is in Beech Island, South Carolina.

WLUB operates a classic rock-formatted station on its HD Radio subchannel and on translator W292EE as Eagle 106.3.

== History ==
WLUB signed on in July 1994. It began life as Eagle 102 - a classic hits station, broadcasting on the 102.3 frequency. That frequency had previously been WGUS - Big Gus (country), Power 102 (contemporary hit radio), and Froggy 102 (country) before settling on a classic rock format using the call letters WEKL. After years of dominating the rock market in Augusta with only a 6,000 watt signal, on August 13, 2007, WEKL traded frequencies with sister country station WIBL, becoming "Eagle 105.7" while WIBL moved to 102.3, becoming "102.3 The Bull".

The 105.7 frequency began in 1952 as WAUG-FM, simulcasting WAUG (1050 AM). The station was sold in 1980 and became WYMX with an album rock format known as "Rock 106". This format lasted until 1984 when it became WFMG with an adult contemporary format known as "M105". WFMG then became "Sunny 105" in early 1986 under the WZNY call letters. In 1994, WZNY was acquired by Savannah Valley Broadcasting, which owned longtime contemporary hits outlet WBBQ. A format and airstaff swap was done in August of that year as WBBQ went AC and WZNY became CHR and within a year's time came to be known as Y-105. In September 2004, WZNY was reborn as "105.7 The Bull", a gold-leaning country outlet with the new call letters of WIBL. On April 1, 2010, classic rock WEKL 102.3 flipped its format to Top 40, becoming "Y102.3", and soon after returned to the WZNY call sign, with the classic rock format and call sign moving from 102.3 to 105.7 as "105.7 The Eagle".

On November 8, 2013, WZNY began stunting with a simulcast of WEKL as it assumed WEKL's format as "Eagle 102.3". WEKL, in return, flipped back to Country as "G105.7, Georgia-Lina's NEW Country". On November 21, 2013, WEKL changed its call sign to WSCG to reflect the new format, and the WEKL call sign returned to WZNY, dropping the WZNY call sign from the Augusta area for a second time. The station brought back the syndicated Bobby Bones Show to mornings on January 2, 2014. It was originally heard for a brief period on Top 40 outlet Y102.3, the station it replaced.

On April 15, 2016, WSCG became 105.7 The Bull and changed its call sign to WLUB. On the same day, a companion classic country station was launched on WLUB-HD2 and on translator W292EE as 106.3 Bull Icons.

On March 11, 2019, WLUB-HD2 and W292EE began simulcasting WEKL and rebranded as "Eagle 106.3" which was in the process of being sold to Educational Media Foundation, becoming an affiliate of K-Love on May 31, 2019.

== HD2 translator ==
Broadcast translator for WLUB-HD2
Call sign	Frequency	City of license	FID	ERP (W)	HAAT	Class	Transmitter coordinates	FCC info
W292EE	106.3 FM	Augusta-Richmond County, Georgia	153230	250	295 m (968 ft)	D	33°36′41.5″N 81°56′29.4″W	LMS
