= WCHZ (AM) =

Radio station in Augusta, Georgia, United States (1930–2015)

- Augusta, Georgia; United States
- Broadcast area: Augusta, Georgia
- Frequency: 1480 kHz
- Branding: Hot 95.5/93.1

Programming
- Format: Classic hip hop

Ownership
- Owner: Beasley Broadcast Group; (Beasley Media Group, LLC)

History
- First air date: 1930
- Last air date: February 5, 2015 (date of license cancellation)
- Former call signs: WRDW (1930–2003); WTEL (2003); WGUS (2003–2012); WCHZ (2012–2015)

Technical information
- Facility ID: 537
- Class: B
- Power: 5,000 watts
- Transmitter coordinates: 33°31′0.5″N 82°0′35.4″W
- Translator: 95.5 W238AU (Augusta)
- Repeaters: WCHZ-FM, WHHD-HD2

WCHZ (1480 AM) was a radio station broadcasting a classic hip hop format, simulcasting WCHZ-FM 93.1 Warranton, Georgia. Licensed to Augusta, Georgia, United States, the station was owned by Beasley Media Group. The transmitter was located along River Watch Parkway northwest of downtown Augusta.

== History ==
The station was first licensed in 1930 to Warren C. Davenport's Musicove, Inc., at 309 Eighth Street in Augusta, for 100 watts on 1370 kHz. The original call letters of WRDW were randomly assigned from an alphabetic list of available call signs, and a later slogan was adopted of "Where Radio Does Wonders". Singer James Brown subsequently became the station's owner.

=== Expanded Band assignment ===
On March 17, 1997, the Federal Communications Commission (FCC) announced that eighty-eight stations had been given permission to move to newly available "Expanded Band" transmitting frequencies, ranging from 1610 to 1700 kHz, with WRDW authorized to move from 1480 to 1630 kHz. In 2003 this new station, also in Augusta, was assigned the historic WRDW call letters.

The FCC's initial policy was that both the original station and its expanded band counterpart could operate simultaneously for up to five years, after which owners would have to turn in one of the two licenses, depending on whether they preferred the new assignment or elected to remain on the original frequency, although this deadline was extended multiple times.

=== Later history ===
On October 3, 2003, the station call sign on 1480 kHz was changed to WTEL, which was changed ten days later to WGUS. On May 28, 2012, the station switched to WCHZ. On January 21, 2015, WCHZ began simulcasting WHHD-HD2, and WCHZ-FM 95.5 FM, branded as "Hot 95.5/93.1" with a classic hip-hop format. The station's program director was Jay "Baby J" Jones and could be heard weekday afternoons during "Traffic Jammin' with Baby J".

Beasley Media surrendered WCHZ's license to the FCC on February 5, 2015, which cancelled the license on the same day. The new expanded band WRDW, on 1630 kHz, was deleted on February 13, 2020.
