= 97.1 FM =

FM radio frequency

The following radio stations broadcast on FM frequency 97.1 MHz:

== Argentina ==
- Alfa in Zárate, Buenos Aires
- LRM743 FM Funes in Funes, Santa Fe
- Vorterix Rock in Buenos Aires
- Radio María in Canals, Córdoba

== Australia ==
- Radio National in Port Macquarie, New South Wales
- Radio National in Young, New South Wales
- Radio National in Jindabyne, New South Wales
- Rebel FM in Stanthorpe, Queensland
- Triple J in Cairns, Queensland
- Triple J in Emerald, Queensland
- 3MDR in Melbourne, Victoria
- 3GLR in Orbost, Victoria
- Radio National in Kalgoorlie, Western Australia

== Brazil ==
- Radio Família Rio de Janeiro

== Canada ==
- CBHL-FM in Liverpool, Nova Scotia
- CBL-FM-4 in Owen Sound, Ontario
- CBON-FM-25 in Timmins, Ontario
- CBTB-FM in Baie Verte, Newfoundland and Labrador
- CFIL-FM in Gillam, Manitoba
- CHLC-FM in Baie-Comeau, Quebec
- CHLX-FM in Gatineau, Quebec
- CIBM-FM-4 in Saint-Juste-du-Lac, Quebec
- CIGL-FM in Belleville, Ontario
- CITB-FM in Thunder Bay, Ontario
- CJBP-FM in Neepawa, Manitoba
- CJMG-FM in Penticton, British Columbia
- CKDR-FM in Sioux Lookout and Red Lake, Ontario
- CKFI-FM in Swift Current, Saskatchewan
- CKRO-FM in Inkerman, New Brunswick
- VF2064 in Fort St. James, British Columbia
- VF2066 in Dease Lake, British Columbia
- VF2121 in Lampman, Saskatchewan
- VF2135 in Kitseguecla, British Columbia
- VF2171 in Skidegate, British Columbia
- VF2173 in Alexandria Reserve, British Columbia
- VF2232 in New Bella Bella, British Columbia
- VF2236 in Decker Lake Indian Reserve, British Columbia
- VF2328 in Revelstoke, British Columbia
- VF2539 in Spences Bridge, British Columbia
- VF2571 in McBride, British Columbia

== China ==
- CNR Music Radio in Beihai
- CNR The Voice of China in Dehong Prefecture, Hinggan League, Hohhot, Jiayuguan and Qiannan Prefecture and
- SZMG Music Radio 97.1 FM

== Indonesia ==
- FM97.1 Radio Dangdut Indonesia 97.1 FM in Jakarta, Indonesia

== Malaysia ==
- Sinar in Alor Setar, Kedah, Perlis & Penang
- TraXX FM in Tawau, Sabah

== Mexico ==
- XEBA-FM in Guadalajara, Jalisco
- XHCHH-FM in Zumpango del Río, Guerrero
- XHHLL-FM in Salina Cruz, Oaxaca
- XHHQ-FM in Hermosillo, Sonora
- XHKY-FM in Huixtla, Chiapas
- XHNLO-FM in Nuevo Laredo, Tamaulipas
- XHPACP-FM in Acatlán de Osorio, Puebla
- XHPE-FM in Torreón, Coahuila
- XHPEEI-FM in Ciudad Acuña, Coahuila
- XHPNIM-FM in Nueva Italia, Michoacán
- XHPU-FM in Monclova, Coahuila
- XHQB-FM in Tulancingo, Hidalgo
- XHRQ-FM in San Juan del Río, Querétaro
- XHVU-FM in Mazatlán, Sinaloa
- XHZC-FM in Río Grande, Zacatecas

== Philippines ==
- DWLS in Manila
- DZLS in Laoag City
- DWGB in Legazpi City
- DYLS-FM in Cebu City
- DXUR in Davao City
- DXMJ-FM in Zamboanga City
- Bangsamoro Radio Suwara Meranaw (BRSM) in Marawi City

== Taiwan ==
- City FM in Tainan

== United Kingdom ==
- Capital North West and North Wales on the Wirral Peninsula
- Downtown Radio in Larne
- Greatest Hits Radio Surrey & East Hampshire in Haslemere
- Heart East in Ipswich, Suffolk
- Heart West in Chard, South West England
- Hits Radio North East in Burnhope
- Radio Carmarthenshire in Carmarthenshire, Wales

== United States ==
- KALS (FM) in Kalispell, Montana
- KAMD-FM in Camden, Arkansas
- KAWU-LP in El Paso, Texas
- KAYQ in Warsaw, Missouri
- KAYV in Crested Butte, Colorado
- KBCQ-FM in Roswell, New Mexico
- KBDJ-LP in Waterloo, Iowa
- KBOB-FM in Haven, Kansas
- KBTK in Kachina Village, Arizona
- KCHP-LP in Arcata, California
- KCMI in Terrytown, Nebraska
- KCSA-LP in San Angelo, Texas
- KCYN in Moab, Utah
- KEGL in Fort Worth, Texas
- KELN in North Platte, Nebraska
- KFND-LP in Rapid City, South Dakota
- KFTK-FM in Florissant, Missouri
- KHUU in Hughes, Alaska
- KJMT in Calico Rock, Arkansas
- KKBR in Billings, Montana
- KKEN in Duncan, Oklahoma
- KLVH in Cleveland, Texas
- KMMA in Green Valley, Arizona
- KNAK-LP in Naknek, Alaska
- KNWB in Hilo, Hawaii
- KNX-FM in Los Angeles, California
- KOYT-LP in Anza, California
- KPFE-LP in Corpus Christi, Texas
- KPSD in Faith, South Dakota
- KRTO in Guadalupe, California
- KSEQ in Visalia, California
- KSMR-LP in Great Falls, Montana
- KTCZ in Minneapolis, Minnesota
- KTSE in Patterson, California
- KULV in Ukiah, California
- KVRP in Haskell, Texas
- KVVL in Maryville, Missouri
- KXCP-LP in Palm Desert, California
- KXPT in Las Vegas, Nevada
- KXRX in Walla Walla, Washington
- KYAL in Muskogee, Oklahoma
- KYCH in Portland, Oregon
- KYCK in Crookston, Minnesota
- KYYX in Minot, North Dakota
- KZBR in La Jara, Colorado
- KZHT in Salt Lake City, Utah
- WASH (FM) in Washington, DC
- WAVD in Ocean Pines, Maryland
- WBFB in Bangor, Maine
- WBHT in Mountain Top, Pennsylvania
- WBNS in Columbus, Ohio
- WBVB in Coal Grove, Ohio
- WCOW in Sparta, Wisconsin
- WDBS in Sutton, West Virginia
- WDRV in Chicago, Illinois
- WEOZ-LP in Loudon, Tennessee
- WEPL-LP in Rochester, New York
- WEZB in New Orleans, Louisiana
- WGJC in University Park, Pennsylvania
- WGLQ in Escanaba, Michigan
- WHRK in Memphis, Tennessee
- WICE-LP in Hendersonville, North Carolina
- WIXL-LP in Madison, Wisconsin
- WJGR-LP in Mobile, Alabama
- WJQQ in Somerset, Kentucky
- WJVE-LP in Debary, Florida
- WKHC in Hatteras, North Carolina
- WLHK in Shelbyville, Indiana
- WLIC in Frostburg, Maryland
- WLVU in Belle Meade, Tennessee
- WMLO-LP in Live Oak, Florida
- WMSF-LP in Mayo, Florida
- WOKK in Meridian, Mississippi
- WOSN in Indian River Shores, Florida
- WOXX in Colebrook, New Hampshire
- WPCX-LP in Clinton, South Carolina
- WQHT in New York, New York
- WQMG in Greensboro, North Carolina
- WREO in Ashtabula, Ohio
- WSRV in Gainesville, Georgia
- WSUN in Holiday, Florida
- WTAQ-FM in Two Rivers, Wisconsin
- WTSY-LP in Port Gibson, Mississippi
- WTYX-LP in Titusville, Florida
- WURY-LP in Phenix City, Alabama
- WVGT-LP in Mount Dora, Florida
- WVHY in Axson, Georgia
- WWMG in Millbrook, Alabama
- WWWR-LP in Wadsworth, Ohio
- WXCM in Whitesville, Kentucky
- WXOX-LP in Louisville, Kentucky
- WXYT in Detroit, Michigan
- WZHD in Canaseraga, New York
- WZRT in Rutland, Vermont
