= KWDZ =

Radio station in Salt Lake City (1945–2017)

- Salt Lake City, Utah; United States
- Broadcast area: Salt Lake City metropolitan area
- Frequency: 910 kHz

Ownership
- Owner: iHeartMedia; (Citicasters Licenses, Inc.)
- Sister stations: KAAZ-FM; KJMY; KNRS; KNRS-FM; KODJ; KZHT

History
- First air date: 1945
- Last air date: April 30, 2017
- Former call signs: KALL (1945–2003)
- Call sign meaning: "Walt Disney"; (co-founder of The Walt Disney Company, former owner)

Technical information
- Licensing authority: FCC
- Facility ID: 2445
- Class: B
- Power: 5,000 watts (day); 1,000 watts (night)
- Transmitter coordinates: 40°30′47.8″N 112°0′25.8″W

Links
- Public license information: Public file; LMS

KWDZ (910 AM) was a broadcast radio station licensed to Salt Lake City, Utah, serving the Salt Lake City metropolitan area. The station was owned and operated by iHeartMedia. The KWDZ broadcast license was held by Citicasters Licenses, Inc.

== History ==
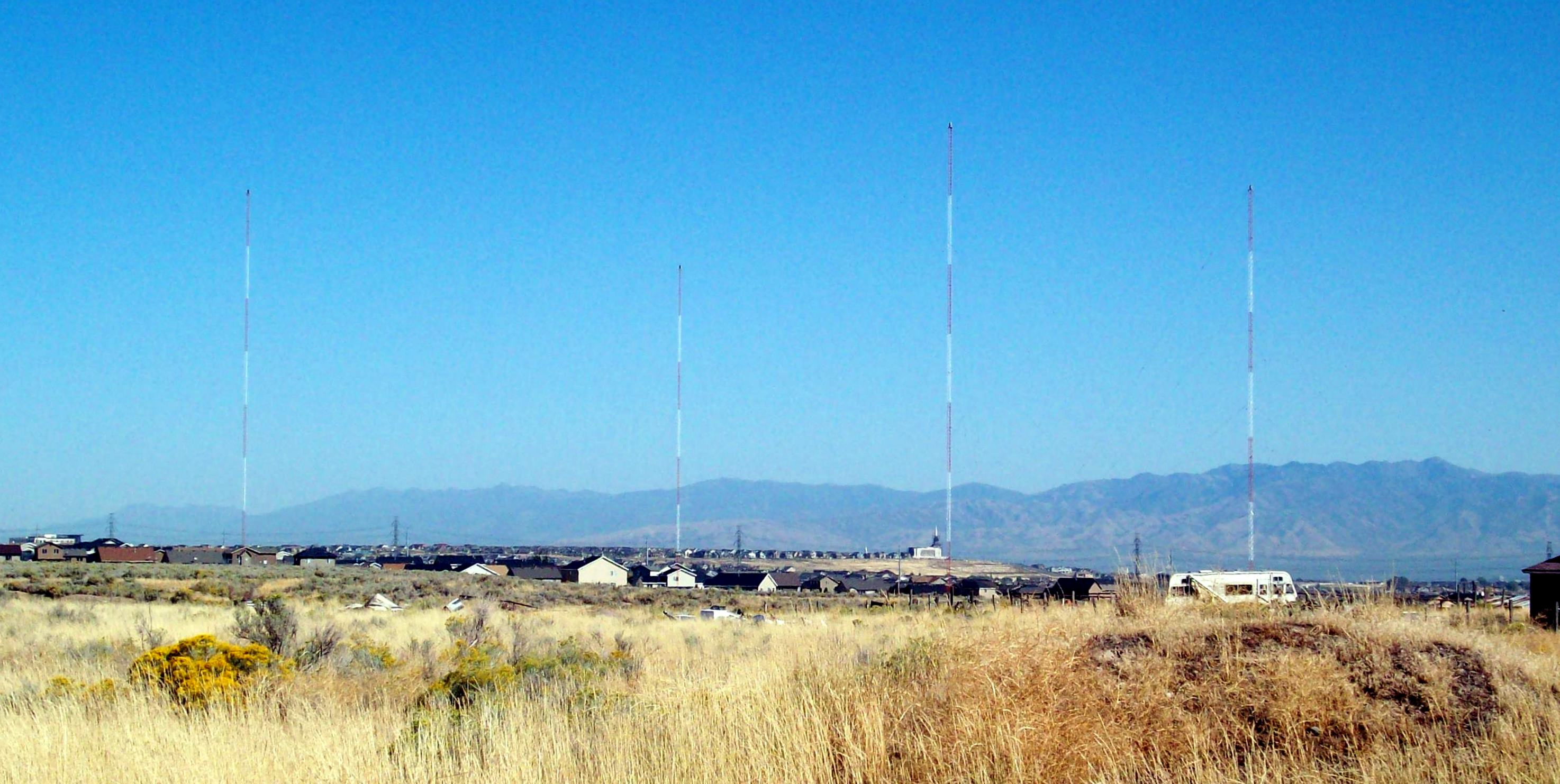
The former transmitter site for KALL/KWDZ in Riverton to the west of the Mountain View Corridor. The full site is now taken up by a housing development which went up in 2016.

The station was founded in 1945, and originally held the callsign KALL. It was originally owned by Mr. and Mrs. George C. Hatch and Mr. and Mrs. Robert H. Hinkley. In 1946, John F. Fitzpatrick, publisher of The Salt Lake Tribune (owned by the Kearns Corporation), representing the Tribune, purchased fifty percent interest in the station from the owners. The Tribune's interest (Kearns-Tribune, Corp.) sold its interest in 1954, to permit its owner (Kearns-Tribune, Corp.) to apply for a license to buy a television license and to purchase a fifty percent ownership in KUTV Channel 2.

KALL had long aired a full service format. In the early 1990s, the station began airing a news/talk format, carrying programming such as The Rush Limbaugh Show and The G. Gordon Liddy Show. The station's ownership changed several times during the 1990s; in 1992, Communications Investment Corp. sold the station to Apollo Radio Partners, owner of KKAT, ending George C. Hatch's ownership of KALL. Apollo Radio sold its stations to Regent Communications in 1995; Regent, in turn, sold its stations to Jacor in 1997. Jacor merged with Clear Channel Communications in 1999. On March 6, 2000, the station's format was adjusted when its sister station KNRS adopted a talk radio format, and the station adopted the slogan "talk radio with an attitude", carrying hosts such as Jim Bohannon and Phil Hendrie.

Clear Channel sold KALL to Mercury Broadcasting Company after its 2001 acquisition of KTVX brought them over ownership limits; it continued to sell advertising on the station under a joint sales agreement. In 2003, Disney/ABC purchased the station for $3,700,000, while the intellectual property and callsign was purchased by Clear Channel Communications for $2,000,000. Disney/ABC bought the station to clear its Radio Disney network, which was about to be dropped by previous affiliate KBEE. Clear Channel moved KALL's talk programming and the KALL callsign to 700 kHz, and on April 30, 2003, the station changed its call sign to KWDZ.

In June 2013, Disney put KWDZ and six other Radio Disney stations in medium markets up for sale, to refocus the network's broadcast distribution on top-25 markets. On August 17, 2013, KWDZ dropped the Radio Disney affiliation and went silent. After almost one year, KWDZ resumed operations on August 14, 2014. Initially broadcasting locally originated automated programming upon its return to the air, Radio Disney programming returned sometime around late September 2014. By that time, Disney had announced plans to sell all but one of Radio Disney's remaining 23 owned-and-operated stations. Originally planning to sign-off the stations on September 26, 2014, Disney later decided to keep the stations on the air until they were sold.

On May 29, 2015, Radio Disney Group filed an application to sell KWDZ to the Citicasters Licenses, Inc. subsidiary of iHeartMedia (the former Clear Channel Communications). iHeart bought KWDZ (and WRDZ-FM) for $1.95 million. The sale was approved by the Federal Communications Commission (FCC) on July 14, 2015. The sale was completed on July 17, 2015, and the station went silent again. Following temporary operations in May 2016 and April 2017, iHeartMedia surrendered the KWDZ license on April 25, 2018; the FCC cancelled it on June 26, 2018.
