= KNRS =

KNRS may refer to:

- King's National Roll Scheme, aid to disabled British veterans of the First world War
- KNRS-FM, an FM radio station in Centerville, Utah, United States
- KNRS (AM), an AM radio station in Salt Lake City, Utah, United States
- The ICAO code for Naval Outlying Landing Field Imperial Beach in Imperial Beach, California, United States
