= KMYU =

Television station in St. George, Utah

- St. George–Salt Lake City, Utah; United States
- City: St. George, Utah
- Channels: Digital: 9 (VHF); Virtual: 12
- Branding: My Utah TV

Programming
- Affiliations: 2.1: CBS; 12.1: Independent with MyNetworkTV

Ownership
- Owner: Sinclair Broadcast Group; (KUTV Licensee, LLC)
- Sister stations: KUTV, KJZZ-TV

History
- Founded: September 11, 1989
- First air date: August 21, 1999
- Former call signs: KUSG (1999–2010)
- Former channel numbers: Analog: 12 (VHF, 1999–2009)
- Former affiliations: CBS (via KUTV, 1999–2008); RTV (2008–2009); This TV (primary 2009–2010, secondary 2010–2014)
- Call sign meaning: MyNetworkTV Utah

Technical information
- Licensing authority: FCC
- Facility ID: 35822
- ERP: 3.2 kW
- HAAT: 43 m (141 ft)
- Transmitter coordinates: 37°3′48″N 113°34′26″W
- Repeaters: KUTV 2.2 (34.2 UHF) Salt Lake City and dependent translators

Links
- Public license information: Public file; LMS
- Website: kmyu.tv

KMYU (channel 12) is a television station licensed to St. George, Utah, United States. It is programmed primarily as an independent station, but maintains a secondary affiliation with MyNetworkTV. KMYU is owned by Sinclair Broadcast Group alongside Salt Lake City–based CBS affiliate KUTV (channel 2) and fellow independent KJZZ-TV (channel 14). The stations share studios on South Main Street in downtown Salt Lake City; KMYU's transmitter is located atop Webb Hill, 2 1/4 miles (3.6 km) south of downtown St. George. Previously, KMYU-TV maintained separate studios in the J. C. Snow Building on East St. George Boulevard in downtown St. George, while KUTV's facilities only housed KMYU's master control and some internal operations.

KUTV's plans to install a full-power station in southern Utah dated to the late 1980s, but while KUTV began selling local advertising on its existing southern Utah translators in 1993, what was then known as KUSG did not begin broadcasting until 1999. In 2008, the station was spun out as "Utah's RTN", an affiliate of the Retro Television Network, which switched to programming from This TV in 2009 and to MyNetworkTV in 2010. KMYU airs MyNetworkTV and syndicated shows as well as repeats of KUTV newscasts and several local sports programs.

Outside of southwestern Utah, KMYU is broadcast statewide on KUTV and its translator network (as subchannel 2.2). Likewise, KUTV is simulcast on one of KMYU's digital subchannels.

== History ==
In 1986, Steven D. King, an Atlanta businessman, successfully petitioned the Federal Communications Commission (FCC) to add channel 12 to St. George as its first full-service television allocation. In 1987, applications were received from Red Mountain Broadcasting Company, whose backers included Jim Rogers, owner of Las Vegas station KVBC; and by KUTV, Inc. The FCC designated these applications for comparative hearing in February 1988, but before the hearing could begin, a settlement agreement was reached and approved on May 23 in which KUTV was granted the permit.

Even though the station would not begin broadcasting until 1999, KUTV began to lay the groundwork for the new station, which received the call sign KUSG. Potential was also recognized for KUSG to possibly create a new media market for southern Utah that then could lead to KCCZ in Cedar City becoming a network affiliate as well. KUTV then drew the ire of the Washington County government, which owned KUTV's translators in the area, by proposing to begin local advertising insertion for the St. George area on the translators—in part to begin building an advertising base in southern Utah. This was possible because of the way the signal was delivered from Salt Lake City. The first hop on the translator network going south was at Levan. The KUTV translator at Levan, which was owned by the station, was authorized as a low-power television station with program origination capabilities. However, competing broadcasters, especially KCCZ, believed the deal gave KUTV an unfair advantage by allowing it to use translator infrastructure owned by local authorities. To defuse this controversy, KUTV management worked out deals with service companies who took over maintenance of the translators in Washington and Iron counties, and local ad insertion began in February 1992. In the meantime, plans to build KUSG itself continued to be delayed. (Note: KUTV had four majority owners in the span of two years. In 1993, the George C. Hatch family sold 40 percent to VS&A Communications Partners of New York, which then became the majority owner with an 88-percent interest. VS&A then decided to sell its media holdings, which included KUTV. VS&A's majority ownership of KUTV was purchased by NBC, with which KUTV was affiliated at the time. However, within months, in the wake of a major national station realignment, NBC traded KUTV, KCNC-TV in Denver, and the channel 4 physical plant in Miami to CBS for the weaker channel 6 facility in Miami and WCAU-TV, the CBS-owned station in Philadelphia, in turn kickstarting an affiliation switch in 1995.)

KUSG began broadcasting on August 21, 1999, and initially operated as a satellite station of KUTV. However, after Four Points Media Group, a broadcast holding company operated by private equity firm Cerberus Capital Management, acquired KUTV, KUSG, and other smaller-market CBS-owned stations in January 2008, Four Points spun out KUSG with separate programming. It became known as "Utah's RTN", an affiliate of the Retro Television Network (RTN) featuring Southern Utah news updates from KUTV; KUTV remained available over the air from its other translator on channel 49 as well as on cable and satellite, and the station estimated this switch left a small number of viewers without KUTV programming.

Equity Media Holdings, which owned RTN, soon fell into major financial difficulties. Initially, KUSG's RTN programming was relayed on Equity-owned KUBX-LP (channel 58) in Salt Lake City and KCBU (channel 3) in Price, which respectively brought the station's programming into Salt Lake City and earned it must-carry status on cable and satellite systems. However, on January 4, 2009, a contract conflict between Equity and Luken Communications (which had acquired RTN in June 2008) interrupted the programming on many RTN affiliates. As a result, Luken moved RTN operations to its headquarters in Chattanooga, Tennessee, and dropped all Equity-owned affiliates, including KUBX and KCBU, immediately. KUSG itself was not affected (aside from the aforementioned interruption in network programming), as it was not an Equity station, but its satellite and Salt Lake City-area Comcast coverage was lost, as they received the station's programming via KUBX/KCBU.

By June 2009, KUSG had dropped RTN (which rebranded to RTV that month) for This TV; it then added programming from MyNetworkTV on September 20, 2010, and changed its call sign to KMYU on November 16, 2010. Outside of MyNetworkTV, KMYU continued to air This TV programs until 2015. On September 8, 2011, Sinclair Broadcast Group announced its intent to purchase Four Points from Cerberus Capital Management for $200 million; Sinclair began managing the stations, including KMYU, under local marketing agreements following antitrust approval. The deal was completed on January 3, 2012.

In September and early October 2011, the station aired NBC's new period drama The Playboy Club in lieu of KSL-TV (channel 5), which refused to air it due to management concerns about content and the program's promotion of Playboy magazine. The program aired at NBC's original Monday night 9 p.m. (MT) timeslot for the series on KMYU. Like Coupling in 2003 however, which KSL also declined to air and aired on the then-KUWB (channel 30, now KUCW), it only aired three episodes before the network made it the first canceled new series of the new television season.

In 2017, Sinclair proposed the purchase of Tribune Media, which owned Salt Lake City Fox affiliate KSTU (channel 13). As part of divestitures related to the deal, Sinclair announced in April 2018 that it would have sold KMYU to Howard Stirk Holdings while continuing to provide services to the station. However, flaws with the deal in other cities—notably Chicago, Dallas, Houston, and St. Louis—resulted in the FCC commissioners designating the transaction for hearing before an administrative law judge in July 2018, which led to its cancellation the following month.

== Local programming ==
=== Sports programming ===
KMYU's sports programming includes live Utah High School Activities Association high school football games, including state championships; KMYU also airs Talkin' Sports, a nightly sports talk show aired after KUTV's 10 p.m. newscast, which it simulcasts. In 2015, KMYU became the main regional broadcaster of Major League Soccer's Real Salt Lake. Sinclair renewed its contract in 2018. (Note: All Major League Soccer local television rights agreements ended after 2022 to make way for MLS's 10-year deal with Apple.) KMYU has also aired matches from RSL's reserve team Real Monarchs (in the USL) and its women's team Utah Royals FC (NWSL). In 2024, KMYU began broadcasting weekend home games for the Salt Lake Bees Minor League Baseball team.

=== Newscasts ===
After KUSG adopted its own separate schedule in 2008, it began airing Southern Utah-specific news updates. Even though multiple KUTV newscasts are repeated or simulcast on KMYU, the station has no dedicated newscasts. National news coverage is provided by the Sinclair-produced The National Desk and the airing of Sinclair's Full Measure with Sharyl Attkisson.

== Technical information ==
=== Subchannels ===
The station's signal is multiplexed:

Subchannels of KMYU
Subchannel	Res.	Short name	Programming
12.1	720p	KMYU-HD	Main KMYU programming
2.1	1080i	KUTV-HD	CBS (KUTV)

Simulcast of subchannels of another station

=== Analog-to-digital conversion ===
KMYU shut down its analog signal, over VHF channel 12, on June 12, 2009, as part of the federally mandated transition from analog to digital television, continuing to broadcast in digital on VHF channel 9 (using virtual channel 12).

=== Translators ===
Two translators in Iron County rebroadcast KMYU, with most of its coverage coming as a KUTV subchannel on that station's translators.

- Parowan, Enoch, Paragonah: K35NT-D
- Rural Beaver, etc.: K19GS-D
