= KSMR =

KSMR may refer to:

- KSMR-LP, a low-power radio station (97.1 FM) licensed to Great Falls, Montana, United States
- KSMR (FM), a radio station (92.5 FM) licensed to Winona, Minnesota, United States
- Kentucky State Militia Radio, a former pirate shortwave radio station that was located in the vicinity of Somerset, Kentucky in 2001.
