= KNRS-FM =

Radio station in Centerville–Salt Lake City, Utah

Simulcast of KNRS, Salt Lake City
- Centerville, Utah; United States
- Broadcast area: Salt Lake City metropolitan area
- Frequency: 105.9 MHz (HD Radio)
- Branding: Talk Radio 105.9 FM / 570 AM KNRS

Programming
- Format: Talk radio
- Network: 24/7 News
- Affiliations: Fox News Radio; Compass Media Networks; Premiere Networks

Ownership
- Owner: iHeartMedia, Inc.; (iHM Licenses, LLC)
- Sister stations: KAAZ-FM; KJMY; KNRS; KODJ; KZHT

History
- First air date: December 24, 1979
- Former call signs: KCGL (1979–1990); KBCK (1990–1992); KUMT (1992–1999); KCPX (1999–2004); KXRV (2004–2008); KTMY (2008–2009)
- Former frequencies: 105.5 MHz (1979–1992); 105.7 MHz (1992–2015)
- Call sign meaning: "News Radio Station"

Technical information
- Licensing authority: FCC
- Facility ID: 69555
- Class: C
- ERP: 25,000 watts
- HAAT: 1,140 meters (3,740 ft)
- Transmitter coordinates: 40°39′33.8″N 112°12′7.8″W
- Repeater: 570 KNRS (Salt Lake City)

Links
- Public license information: Public file; LMS
- Webcast: Listen live (via iHeartRadio)
- Website: knrs.iheart.com

KNRS-FM (105.9 MHz, "Talk Radio 105.9") is a commercial radio station licensed to Centerville, Utah, United States, and serving the Salt Lake City metropolitan area. Owned by iHeartMedia, KNRS-FM simulcasts a talk radio format with KNRS (570 AM). The studios are on South Decker Lake Drive in West Valley City, and the transmitter is sited on Farnsworth Peak in the Oquirrh Mountains, 18 miles (29 km) southwest of Salt Lake City. KNRS-FM broadcasts using HD Radio technology.

== History ==
=== Easy listening: 1979-1990 ===
On December 24, 1979, the station originally signed on as KCGL at 105.5 FM. It was powered at only 500 watts and offered easy listening music for the northern suburbs of Salt Lake City.

=== Country: 1990-1992 ===
In 1990, the station switched to country music as KBCK (K-Buck), carrying Buck Owens' "Real Country" network.

=== Triple A: 1992-2001 ===
In 1992, the station got a major power boost and increase in antenna height while moving to 105.7 MHz, now covering much of the Salt Lake City metropolitan area. The call sign changed to KUMT, as "105.7 The Mountain", airing an adult album alternative (Triple A) format.

=== Modern rock: 2001-2005 ===
From November 2001 until November 2005, the station's call letters were KCPX identifying itself as "Channel 105-7" and airing a modern rock format. (KCPX had been the call letters for one of Salt Lake City's legendary Top 40 stations, at 1320 AM and 98.7 FM.)

=== Triple A: 2005-2007 ===
From November 2005 until November 1, 2007, the station returned to an adult album alternative format as KXRV, branded as "105.7 The River, Quality Music from Then and Now".

=== Country: 2007-2009 ===
Beginning on November 1, 2007, KXRV returned to a country format, branded "My Country 105.7", featuring voice mail messages from listeners, with no live DJs. Pre-recorded tags were heard after each song noting the title and artist. The call letters were changed to KTMY on January 17, 2008, to reflect the new format.

=== Spanish: 2009 ===
In January 2009, the station flipped to Spanish-language adult contemporary music as "La Preciosa 105.7".

=== Talk: 2009-present ===
In August 2009, KTMY switched to KNRS-FM, and began carrying its current talk radio format. On October 8, 2015, at 5 p.m., KNRS-FM moved up the dial from 105.7 FM to 105.9 FM, rebranding as "Talk Radio 105.9".

== Programming ==
The station features predominantly conservative syndicated national talk show hosts, including The Clay Travis and Buck Sexton Show, Sean Hannity, Glenn Beck, Jesse Kelly, Clyde Lewis, Coast to Coast AM with George Noory and This Morning, America's First News with Gordon Deal. One local program is heard weekdays during afternoon drive time, hosted by Rod Arquette. On Saturdays, KNRS originates the regionally syndicated weekend "Travel Show" hosted by Larry Gelwix. Other weekend shows deal with money, health, computers and guns. Syndicated weekend hosts include Kim Komando and Bill Cunningham, as well as repeats of weekday shows. Some hours on weekends are paid brokered programming.

KNRS-AM-FM have a full news department, with local news every thirty minutes on weekdays. In addition, the station is a network affiliate of co-owned NBC News Radio for national news coverage. KNRS gets some of its local news and weather coverage from KUTV. KNRS-AM-FM air live traffic reports on weekdays from 5:00 a.m. until 10:00 p.m. and on Saturdays from 10:00 a.m. until 6:00 p.m. Traffic reports are provided by iHeartMedia's Total Traffic Network, based at the Utah Department of Transportation in Salt Lake City.

KNRS-AM-FM's sister stations include KAAZ-FM, KJMY, KODJ, KWDZ, and KZHT.

All KNRS-AM-FM programming is streamed live on the station's website and iHeartRadio website and app. In addition, all of the station's local shows (both weekday and weekend) and select national shows as a podcast.

== KNRS-FM HD2 ==
KNRS-FM broadcasts using HD Radio technology. The HD2 digital subchannel had carried a mainstream AC format branded as "Soft Rock" from iHeartMedia's Premium Choice networks. The HD2 subchannel was later discontinued.
