= XHCHH-FM =

XHCHH-FM may refer to:

- XHCHH-FM (Chihuahua) in Chihuahua City, D95 94.9 FM
- XHCHH-FM (Guerrero) in Zumpango del Río, Lokura grupera 97.1 FM and 650 AM
