= KODJ =

Radio station in Salt Lake City

- Salt Lake City, Utah; United States
- Broadcast area: Salt Lake City metropolitan area
- Frequency: 94.1 MHz (HD Radio)
- Branding: 94.1 KODJ

Programming
- Format: Classic hits
- Subchannels: HD2: "Magic" (bilingual adult contemporary)
- Affiliations: Premiere Networks

Ownership
- Owner: iHeartMedia; (iHM Licenses, LLC)
- Sister stations: KAAZ-FM; KJMY; KNRS; KNRS-FM; KZHT

History
- First air date: December 1, 1968
- Former call signs: KALL-FM (1968–1984, 1991–1993); KLCY-FM (1984–1991)
- Call sign meaning: Oldies; inherited from the former callsign of KCBS-FM in Los Angeles

Technical information
- Facility ID: 48916
- Class: C
- ERP: 21,500 watts
- HAAT: 1,219 meters (3,999 ft)
- Transmitter coordinates: 40°39′34.8″N 112°12′7.8″W

Links
- Webcast: Listen live (via iHeartRadio); HD2: Listen live (via iHeartRadio)
- Website: 941kodj.iheart.com

KODJ (94.1 FM) is a commercial radio station in Salt Lake City, Utah. The station airs a classic hits radio format and is owned by iHeartMedia, Inc. The station's studios and offices are located in West Valley City.

KODJ has an effective radiated power of 21,500 watts. The transmitter site is located in Erda, Utah, on Farnsworth Peak in the Oquirrh Mountains. KODJ is also heard on about a dozen FM translator stations in small communities around Utah and Wyoming.

== History ==
=== KALL-FM (1968–1984) ===
On December 1, 1968, the station signed on as KALL-FM. It was the FM counterpart to KALL (910 AM) (not related to the current incarnation on 700 AM). KALL-AM-FM were owned by the Salt Lake City Broadcasting Company, which was also the partial owner of KUTV. At first, KALL-FM simulcast the AM station, carrying its full service, middle of the road format of popular music and ABC Radio News.

In the 1970s, the simulcast ended and the FM station switched to an automated Top 40 format, while still keeping the KALL-FM call sign.

=== Adult contemporary (1984–1991) ===
In May 1984, KALL-FM switched its call letters to KLCY-FM, and changed format to soft adult contemporary music as "Classy 94.1". Over the next few years, the format moved a bit more uptempo to mainstream adult contemporary.

=== Oldies/classic hits (1991–present) ===
On September 30, 1991, the station's format was changed from AC to oldies. The call letters were changed back to KALL-FM on July 10. Management wanted to recapture some of the listeners who had grown up on KALL-FM when it was a contemporary hits station.

On December 3, 1993, the call sign switched to the current KODJ. The original KODJ call letters were originally found on a radio station in Los Angeles.

The station used the branding name "Oldies 94.1" through the 1990s. In 1999, the station was acquired by Clear Channel Communications, based in San Antonio. (The corporate name changed to the current iHeartMedia in 2014.) Clear Channel rebranded the station as "94.1 KODJ" in 2001.

Through this time, the station had a longtime staff line-up. Dickie Shannon became the morning drive time host in 1994 and was joined by co-host Angel Deville in 1995. The pair married in 1997. Their show was re-branded "Married with Microphones." Clear Channel dropped the pair in 2007. They were replaced with "Steve Harmon and the Breakfast Club."

Other past staff members include Rob Boshard, a former KISN DJ who was told early in his career that he did not have a voice for radio. Boshard's "Rockin' Rob in the Afternoon" show ended in 2009. Ed Wright hosted the night shift as "The Music Professor." He left the station in 2004 following a bout of cancer.

In the early 2000s, the station returned to the name "Oldies 94.1". On January 15, 2015, KODJ rebranded back to "94.1 KODJ, Salt Lake's Greatest Hits". The station also launched a new logo, and once again, removed the "oldies" wording from the station's branding. In the late 2010s, the station began airing Ellen K on Saturday mornings, while rebroadcasts of American Top 40 episodes first aired in the 1970s and 1980s are heard on Sundays.
