= Kcsa =

Kcsa may refer to:

- KCSA-LP, a radio station serving the San Angelo, Texas area
- KcsA potassium channel, an ion channel from the bacterium Streptomyces lividans
