= XHHLL-FM =

Two Mexican radio stations bear the XHHLL-FM callsign:

- XHHLL-FM (Oaxaca), 97.1 FM "Los 40" in Salina Cruz, Oaxaca (combo with XEHLL-AM)
- XHHLL-FM (Sonora), 90.7 FM "La Kaliente" on Cerro Bachoco in Hermosillo, Sonora
