= Ken Dashow =

American writer and DJ

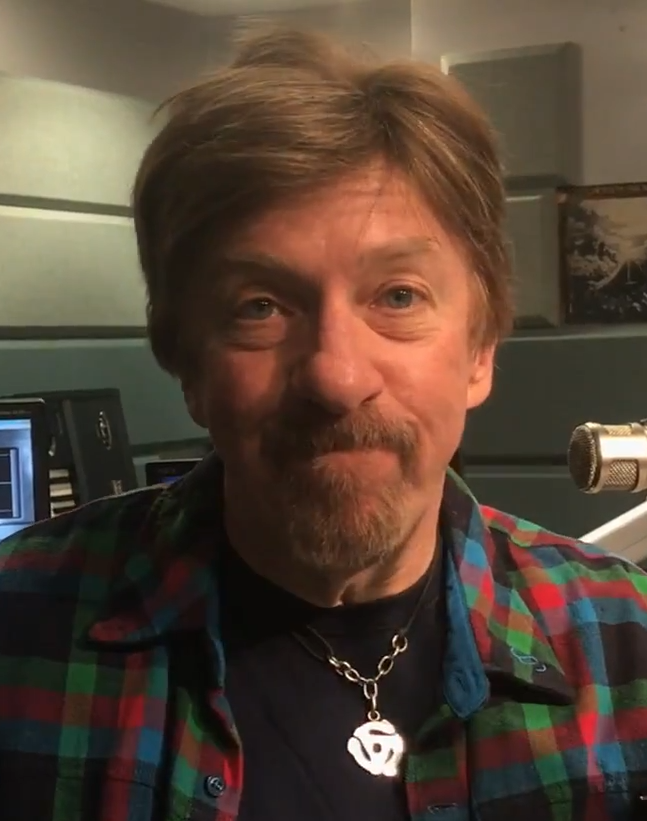
- Dashow in 2017
- Born: 1 May 1958 (age 68)
- Presenting career
- Station: WAXQ

Ken Dashow (born May 1, 1958) is a writer, performer and director. He is a disc jockey at New York City's WAXQ "Q104.3" classic rock radio station. He is also voicetracked to Classic Rock WBGG-FM "Big 105.9" in Miami, WPYX PYX106, 106.5 in Albany, NY, WNNJ 103.7 in Newton, NJ, and WEGR Rock 103, 102.7 FM in Memphis. Brooklyn born and raised, he has spent the last 30 years in New York radio. He has written several plays, a collection of which was published by Dramatists Play Service entitled Dashow Must Go On, and Rock is Dead which was produced Off-Broadway at the SoHo Playhouse. His screenplays The Naked Detective and Desire have become cult classics.

== Early life ==
Dashow was born in May 1, 1958 as the son of Irving Dashow, a retailer in the garment industry, and Adele Dashow, a Brooklyn community leader. He grew up in Sheepshead Bay.

== Radio career ==
- WIXL (1978 - 1979)
- WRCN (1979 – 1980)
- WAPP (1980 - 1982)
- WNEW-FM-AM (1982 - 1999)
- SW NETWORKS - CLASSIC FM,"THE EDGE OF REALITY" (1997–2000)
- WAXQ (Q104.3) (1999–present)
- WBGG-FM (105.9 FM Miami-Ft. Lauderdale) (Voicetracked 2009–present)
- WRVQ-FM (96.1 FM Richmond, VA) (Voicetracked 2013–present)
