= Christianne Klein =

American journalist

- Education: Wellesley College
- Occupation: Journalist
- Television: KUTV; KNVN; WJLA-TV; ABC News; KTXL; KLAS-TV (2016–present)

Christianne Klein is an American television news anchor, journalist, lifestyle author, television personality, and former anchor and correspondent for ABC News. While at ABC, she operated in both New York, NY and Washington DC. In New York, she anchored breaking news coverage for the network and contributed to ABC's network programs including Good Morning America.

Klein is the author of the children’s book, Anna and the Germ that Came to Visit (April 2020). Klein teamed up with her mother, Licensed Marriage and Family Therapist Helene Van Sant-Klein, to add additional therapeutic aspects to the story. The book is designed to give families the tools they need to deal with the sudden changes brought on by the coronavirus pandemic. She released her first food and beauty cookbook, Christianne's Herbal Kitchen: Fresh Herb Recipes for Body and Soul in November 2011. Klein is also a global Ambassador for HealthCorps, a non-profit organization founded by Dr. Mehmet Oz and his wife, Lisa, to combat the childhood obesity epidemic.

Prior to ABC News, she worked as an anchor and reporter for ABC-7/WJLA-TV in Washington, DC, USA. She is a California native and has worked as the main anchor for KNVN in Chico, California and a weekday anchor for KUTV Channel 2 in Salt Lake City, Utah.

She appeared as news reporter Linda Garvey in the 2006 movie, American Dreamz and was a frequent panelist on the late night talk show "Politically Incorrect with Bill Maher". Prior to and during her news career, Klein was a stage performer specializing in comedies, musical theater and Shakespeare.

Klein was described (by Rev. Gus Wagster of Chico News and Review, Chico, CA.) as "Marilyn, Madonna and Mansfield all rolled into one".

Klein is the granddaughter of Helene Machado, a former athlete and member of the All-American Girls Professional Baseball League. Machado was inducted into the Baseball Hall of Fame and Museum in 1988.

== Awards ==
Klein has been nominated and won numerous awards, including Emmy awards and an Edward R Murrow award.
