= XHPACP-FM =

Radio station in Acatlán de Osorio, Puebla

- Acatlán, Puebla; Mexico
- Frequency: 97.1 FM (HD Radio)
- Branding: Radio TexMex

Programming
- Format: Regional Mexican

Ownership
- Owner: Luis Fernando Álvarez Laso

History
- First air date: September 10, 2018
- Call sign meaning: Acatlán de Osorio, Puebla

Technical information
- Class: A
- ERP: 27.4 watts
- HAAT: 562.2 meters
- Transmitter coordinates: 18°08′43.8″N 97°56′52.2″W

Links
- Website: radiotexmex.fm

XHPACP-FM is a radio station on 97.1 FM in Acatlán, Puebla. The station is owned by Luis Fernando Álvarez Laso and known as Radio TexMex, which carries a Regional Mexican format.

== History ==
Radio TexMex originally began operations as an online Internet radio station in February 2015. The station was designed with a special focus on topics affecting Mexicans who had emigrated to the United States, including making Mexican immigrants aware of legal rights and other resources.

XHPACP was awarded in the IFT-4 radio station auction of 2017 and signed on September 10, 2018, with Álvarez Laso paying $405,000 pesos and committing to equip the station with HD Radio. Building the station involved constructing studios in Acatlán de Osorio, which had no commercial radio stations prior to XHPACP's signing on (another station, XHPAOS-FM 94.5, was also awarded in IFT-4). Former governor Mario Marín Torres was brought onto the project to help identify a transmitter site for the new station, ultimately selecting Cerro Verde in San Jerónimo Xayacatlán. Building a transmitter atop the mountain required delivering equipment to the site by way of ten burros, as no other vehicle could reach the mountaintop.
