= XHQB-FM =

Radio station in Tulancingo, Hidalgo

- Tulancingo, Hidalgo; Mexico
- Broadcast area: Tulancingo, Hidalgo
- Frequency: 97.1 FM
- Branding: Súper Stereo Miled

Programming
- Format: Regional Mexican

Ownership
- Owner: Grupo Miled; (Emisoras Miled, S.A. de C.V.)

History
- First air date: June 26, 1970 (concession)

Technical information
- ERP: 6,000 watts
- Transmitter coordinates: 20°03′43.6″N 98°21′53.9″W

Links
- Website: miledradio.miledmusic.com/tulancingo/

XHQB-FM is a radio station in Tulancingo, Hidalgo, broadcasting on 97.1 FM. It is owned by Grupo Miled and known as Súper Stereo Miled, carrying a Regional Mexican format.

== History ==
XHQB began as XEQB-AM 1340, which received its concession on June 26, 1970. It was owned by Oscar Bravo Santos and broadcast with 250 watts. The station was later sold to Radio Tulancingo, S.A., which remained in the Bravo family, and upgraded to 1 kW.

In 2011, XEQB was cleared to migrate to FM. In 2015, the concession was transferred to Grupo Miled.
