= KJMY =

Radio station in Bountiful–Salt Lake City, Utah

- Bountiful, Utah; United States
- Broadcast area: Salt Lake City metropolitan area - Ogden - Provo
- Frequency: 99.5 MHz (HD Radio)
- Branding: My 99.5

Programming
- Format: Hot adult contemporary
- Subchannels: HD2: Bloomberg Radio
- Affiliations: Premiere Networks

Ownership
- Owner: iHeartMedia, Inc.; (iHM Licenses, LLC)
- Sister stations: KNRS, KNRS-FM, KODJ, KAAZ-FM, KZHT

History
- First air date: March 15, 1988
- Former call signs: KBZE (1988–1989); KLVV (1988–1991); KUTQ (1991–1996); KURR (1996–2004)
- Call sign meaning: "My"

Technical information
- Licensing authority: FCC
- Facility ID: 6543
- Class: C
- ERP: 40,000 watts
- HAAT: 900 meters (3,000 ft)
- Transmitter coordinates: 40°36′29″N 112°9′33″W
- Translator: HD2: 99.1 K256AE (Salt Lake City)
- Repeater: 99.5 KJMY-FM2 (Park City)

Links
- Public license information: Public file; LMS
- Webcast: Listen live (via iHeartRadio)
- Website: my995fm.iheart.com

KJMY (99.5 FM) is a commercial radio station licensed to Bountiful, Utah, and serving the Salt Lake City metropolitan area, including Ogden and Provo. The station is owned by iHeartMedia, Inc., and it broadcasts a hot adult contemporary format. The station's studios are located in West Valley City.

KJMY has an effective radiated power (ERP) of 40,000 watts. Its transmitter is on Nelson Peak Road in West Jordan. KJMY broadcasts using HD Radio technology. Its digital subchannel carries business news from Bloomberg Radio, which in turn feeds an FM translator at 99.1 MHz.

== History ==
=== Smooth jazz (1988–1989) ===
The construction permit was assigned the call sign KBZE on February 22, 1988, while it was still an unbuilt station. KBZE signed on the air on March 15, 1988. It was owned by the Bountiful Broadcasting Company and it carried a smooth jazz format as "The Breeze."

=== Adult contemporary (1989–1990) ===
On February 14, 1989, the station changed its call letters to KLVV. As "K-Love," the station carried an adult contemporary format.

=== Top 40 (1990–1991) ===
On October 8, 1990, KLVV flipped to Top 40/CHR as "Q-99."

=== Rock (1991–1996) ===
On June 17, 1991, the station became KUTQ with the name "Rock 99". As KUTQ, the station achieved its highest ratings with the afternoon show Mick and Allen which later moved to KBER 101.1 FM.

=== Classic rock (1996–2004) ===
On September 6, 1996, the station became KURR, and changed its format to classic rock, keeping the "Rock 99" name. In 1999, KURR was acquired by Clear Channel Communications, the forerunner to today's iHeartMedia.

=== Hot adult contemporary (2004–present) ===
After struggling in the ratings for many years, on November 4, 2004, the current call sign KJMY was adopted. The station's format became hot adult contemporary. KJMY became the only hot AC again in Salt Lake City following the reverting of KBEE to adult contemporary in February 2012. (KBEE later shifted back to Adult Top 40 in 2013.)

== KJMY-HD2 ==
Since March 2010, KJMY's HD2 digital subchannel has fed an analog FM translator station, K256AE (99.1), licensed to Salt Lake City. The station was initially branded as "Classic Country 99.1", and operated using a loophole in FCC translator regulations to broadcast an additional analog signal to the market. On September 15, 2011, KJMY-HD2 changed to classic rock, branded as "Rock 99.1".

On January 11, 2013, KJMY-HD2 changed to alternative rock, branded as "The Alternative Project". On May 21, 2014, KJMY-HD2 changed its format to country music, branded as "Country 99.1". On May 6, 2015, KJMY-HD2 was changed to a simulcast of contemporary hit sister station KZHT 97.1 FM.

On February 7, 2019, KJMY-HD2 changed to soft adult contemporary, branded as "Easy 99.1". On January 27, 2021, KJMY-HD2 flipped to business news from Bloomberg Radio, branded as "Business 99.1".
