= XHPU-FM =

Radio station in Monclova, Coahuila

- Monclova, Coahuila; Mexico
- Broadcast area: Monclova, Coahuila
- Frequency: 97.1 MHz
- Branding: La PU

Ownership
- Owner: GRM Radio; (Patronato Cultural Monclova, A.C.)

History
- First air date: August 11, 1982 (permit)

Technical information
- Licensing authority: CRT
- Class: B1
- ERP: 25 kW
- HAAT: −52.98 m (−173.8 ft)
- Transmitter coordinates: 26°54′14″N 101°24′45″W

Links
- Website: www.grmradio.com.mx

XHPU-FM is a noncommercial radio station on 97.1 FM in Monclova, Coahuila. It is operated by GRM Radio and known as La PU.

== History ==
XEPU-AM 1110 received its permit on August 11, 1982 and was licensed to operate with 250 watts as a daytimer. It later migrated to FM.

XEPU is one of the few permit stations to hold a four-letter callsign and one of the first to operate in conjunction with commercial stations (in this case, XHMDA-FM 104.9).
