= Webb Hill =

Hill in Utah, United States

- Webb Hill, looking south from central St. George

Highest point
- Elevation: 3,140 feet (957 m) NGVD 29
- Coordinates: 37°03′49″N 113°34′22″W

Geography
- Location within Utah
- Location: St. George; Washington County, Utah, U.S.
- Topo map: USGS Saint George

Climbing
- Easiest route: Access Road

Webb Hill is a hill located in St. George, Utah, in Washington County. The hill houses numerous radio and television tower facilities that serve the local area. The hill's geology is common with the surrounding region. In 1998, the skeletal remains of a male were found on the mountain.

== Geology ==
As with the surrounding area, soil and rock formations on Webb Hill are red in appearance due to the presence of iron oxide. Although portions of the older section of the city of St. George (particularly the southern part near the Virgin River) lie on floodplain alluvium, much of the city is built directly upon Jurassic, Triassic, and Permian period sedimentary bedrock. This includes Webb Hill. At its highest point, the hill reaches 3,140 feet (957 m) in elevation. It is 1.3 miles (2 km) in length from east to west, and 0.5 miles (1 km) in length from north to south.

== Radio ==
Multiple lower power and booster stations broadcast from the hill, a full list of which can be found here. Given these stations are translators and lower power stations, their coverage of the region is limited. Full power stations in St. George transmit from Seegmiller Mountain, 17 miles south of town in Arizona.

== Television ==
Along with radio station transmitters, the hill is home to numerous television stations. The two best known stations are KMYU (digital channel 9) and KUEW (digital channel 18). KMYU is a full service television station while KUEW is a satellite of KUED (PBS) from Salt Lake City. All stations on the list appearing 2.9 miles away from St. George are in fact broadcasting from within the city on Webb Hill. In total 17 television stations (most of them low power) broadcast from the mountain. However, due to the national digital television transition, several of the analog translator stations were shut off.

== Internet ==
Along with radio and television station transmitters, Webb Hill is home to one of the local high speed internet providers' transmitters in St. George.
