= XHRQ-FM =

Radio station in San Juan del Río, Querétaro

- San Juan del Río, Querétaro; Mexico
- Frequency: 97.1 FM
- Branding: La Z

Programming
- Format: Regional Mexican

Ownership
- Owner: Respuesta Radiofónica; (XHRQ-FM, S.A. de C.V.)

History
- First air date: November 28, 1988 (concession)
- Call sign meaning: Radio Querétaro

Technical information
- Class: C1
- ERP: 61.04 kW
- HAAT: 71.97 meters (236.1 ft)
- Transmitter coordinates: 20°40′20″N 100°20′38″W

Links
- Webcast: XHRQ-FM
- Website: lazqro.com.mx

XHRQ-FM is a radio station on 97.1 FM in San Juan del Río, Querétaro. The station is owned by Respuesta Radiofónica and carries a Regional Mexican format known as La Z.

== History ==
XHRQ began with a concession awarded to Audio Panorama, S.A., in 1988; Audio Panorama had sought the station since the mid-1970s, at which time it was proposed that XHRQ broadcast on 105.1. It was originally owned by Grupo Radiorama until it was sold to Respuesta Radiofónica.
