= Standard-Examiner =

Newspaper in Ogden, Utah

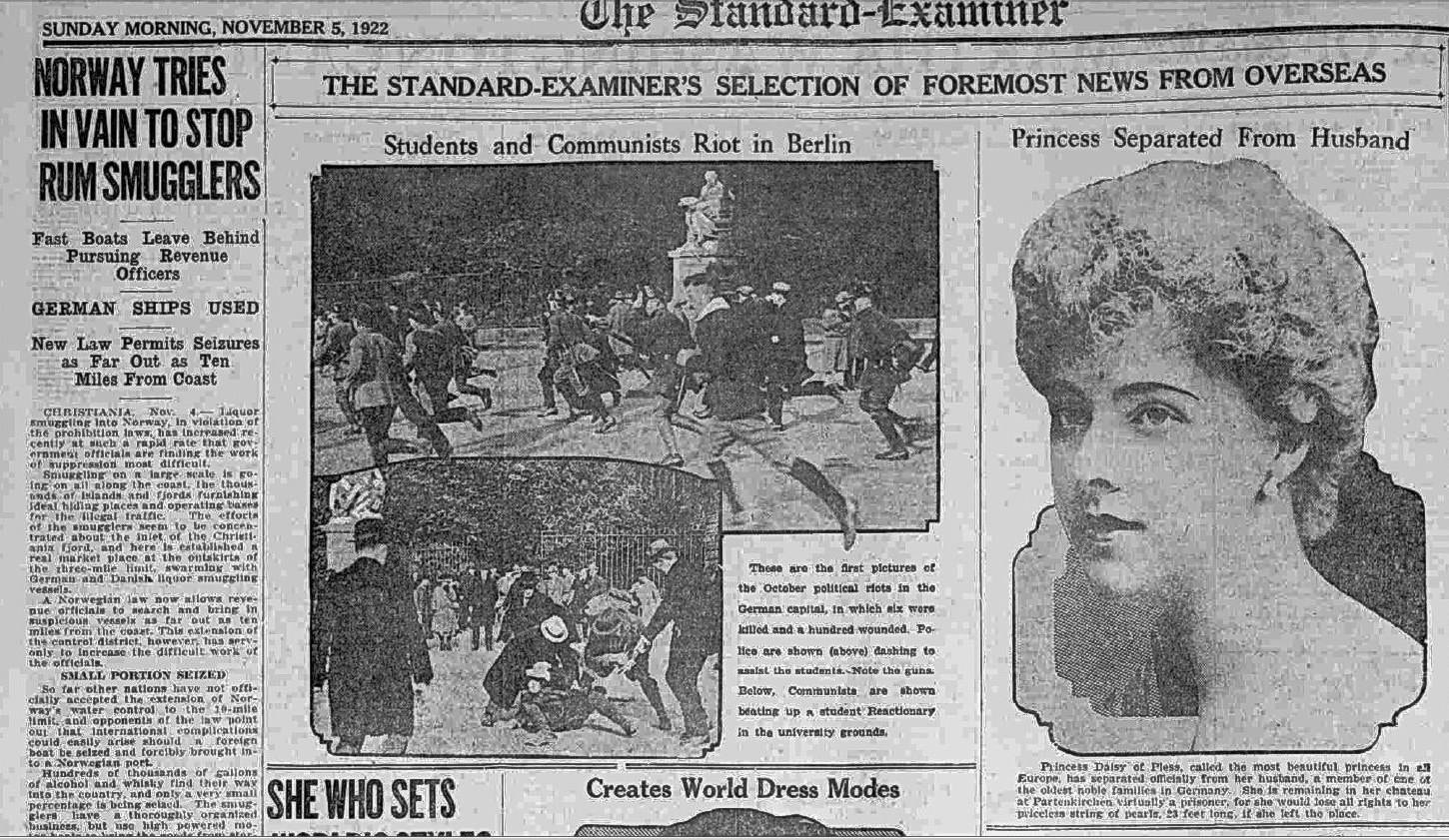
- A 1922 front page of The Standard-Examiner
- Type: Daily newspaper
- Owner: Ogden Newspapers
- Founder: Frank J. Cannon
- Publisher: Jim Konig
- Editor: Ryan Christner
- Managing editor: Jared Lloyd
- Founded: 1888
- Language: English
- Headquarters: Ogden, Utah; United States
- Sister newspapers: Provo Daily Herald
- Website: standard.net

The Standard-Examiner is a daily morning newspaper published in Ogden, Utah. As of 2017, it is the third largest daily newspaper in terms of circulation in Utah, after The Salt Lake Tribune and the Deseret News. The paper has served Weber, Davis, Box Elder and Morgan Counties for over a century.

== History ==
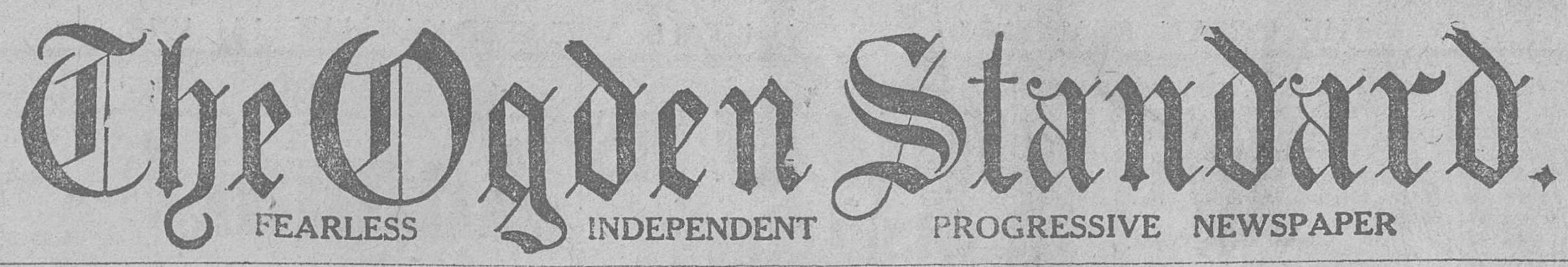
Nameplate, The Ogden Standard (newspaper) on Wednesday May 15, 1918

On January 1, 1888, the first edition of the Ogden Standard was published. It was founded by Frank J. Cannon. In 1892, Cannon sold the paper to William Glasmann so he could run for congress. Frank Francis, managing editor at the Standard for 7 years, secured an Associated Press franchise and launched a morning newspaper in Ogden called The Morning Examiner on January 1, 1904. It was rumored the Examiner was financially back by William Randolph Hearst, but this was false. It was actually funded by Glasmann.

In 1911, the Examiner was acquired by J. U. Eldridge. In 1916, Glasmann died of a sudden heart attack. The Evening Standard was then published by his widow Evelyn Ellis Glasmann. Their son Abraham Lincoln Glasmann worked as editor and son Roscoe "Ross" Glasmann worked as general manager. Mrs. Glasmann started a tradition of serving coffee and homemade donuts to election night crowds, which the newspaper continued for decades.

On April 1, 1920, the Standard and Examiner merged to form the Standard-Examiner. Mrs. Glasmann remarried to J.S. Glazebrook, a prominent real estate broker, and he died 14 years before her death in 1955. Abe Glasmann died in 1970. He was succeeded by his daughter Wilda Gene Glasmann Hatch, who was married to George C. Hatch.

In February 1989, The Lakeside Review of Davis County, a weekly sibling paper, was absorbed into the Standard-Examiner. Later that year the Hatch family acquired sole ownership of the paper and reorganized Standard Corp. with help from E. W. Scripps Company. Randell "Randy" C. Hatch followed in his mother's footsteps and was named editor and publisher. At that time the Hatch family also owned KUTV. In December 1990, Randy Hatch announced a series of cost saving measures, including cutting the paper's size by 30%.

The Hatch family took on debt to gain complete control of the Standard-Examiner while businesses cut back on buying advertisements amid the early 1990s recession in the United States. In December 1991, Hatch family announced plans to sell the paper and entered talks with businessman Joe Cannon, a descendant of Frank J. Cannon. At that time the paper's Sunday circulation was 58,000. The deal fell through and the Standard-Examiner was instead sold to Sandusky Newspapers, Inc. of Sandusky, Ohio, on March 23, 1994.

In 2000, the Standard-Examiner moved to Business Depot Ogden, a business park that had once been Defense Depot Ogden. A new $10 million printing press was installed, and the newspaper switched from an afternoon to morning publication in the same year. In April 2018, the West Virginia-based Ogden Newspapers, which owned the Provo Daily Herald, purchased the Standard-Examiner. Following the sale 29 staffers were laid off.

== Top of Utah ==
The Top of Utah is used to refer to the northern section of Utah, including the Davis, Weber, Box Elder, Morgan, Cache, and Rich counties." This term was coined by Standard-Examiner publisher Scott Trundle in the mid-1990s and used in a December 31, 2000, Ogden Standard-Examiner editorial as "the six-county Top of Utah region."

== Online archive ==
The Marriott Library at the University of Utah has digitized early editions of the predecessor versions of the Standard-Examiner, including the Ogden Junction, the Ogden Herald, and the Ogden Standard.

== See also ==
- List of newspapers in Utah
