= Humberto López Lena =

Mexican politician

Humberto López Lena Cruz
- Born: 6 July 1955 (age 70); Juchitán de Zaragoza, Oaxaca, Mexico
- Occupation: Politician
- Political party: Morena (formerly Movimiento Ciudadano)

Cruz Humberto López Lena (born 6 July 1955) is a Mexican politician. From 2006 to 2009, he served as deputy of the LX Legislature of the Mexican Congress representing Oaxaca.

== Political career ==
López Lena's first position in government was as the director of radio for the state government under Heladio Ramírez López, who was the governor between 1986 and 1992. He also went on to become the general coordinator of the state government's public relations office.

In 2006, as part of Convergencia, he was elected as a proportional representation deputy to the LX Legislature. He served on three commissions: Radio, Television and Film; Environment and Natural Resources; and Special on Attacks on Journalists.

In 2007, López Lena ran as the Convergencia candidate for the municipal presidency of Oaxaca City, finishing with 29,000 votes and behind the PRI candidate.

Nearly six months prior to the end of his legislative term, on March 3, 2009, López Lena left Convergencia and became independent, shedding all his commission assignments.

The Morena party nominated López Lena as its candidate for the eighth district of Oaxaca in 2015, over the objections of local party members, with one saying that she didn't want a candidate who had previously been part of the PRI, PRD and Convergencia.

== Broadcasting career ==
López Lena owns Corporación de Medios de Información as well as Corporación Radiofónica Oaxaqueña, which owns radio stations across the state as well as Encuentro, a newspaper and associated television channel. One of the stations, XHHLL-FM in Salina Cruz, bears his initials.

He additionally has sat on the board of directors of both the Oaxaca and national organizations of the Cámara Nacional de la Industria de Radio y Televisión (CIRT), the broadcasters' association, as well as on the chamber of commerce and business organizations in the Istmo region.
