= XHZC-FM =

Radio station in Río Grande, Zacatecas

- Río Grande, Zacatecas; Mexico
- Frequency: 97.1 FM
- Branding: La Grande de Río Grande

Programming
- Format: Full-service radio

Ownership
- Owner: Radiodifusoras de Zacatecas, S.A.

History
- First air date: July 4, 1962 (concession)
- Call sign meaning: From "Zacatecas"

Technical information
- Licensing authority: CRT
- Class: B1
- ERP: 25 kW
- HAAT: −86.7 m (−284 ft)
- Transmitter coordinates: 23°49′46″N 103°02′17″W

Links
- Website: www.lagrandederiogrande.com

XHZC-FM is a radio station on 97.1 FM in Río Grande, Zacatecas, known as La Grande de Río Grande.

== History ==
XEZC-AM 1360 in Concepción del Oro received its concession in 1962. It was owned by Saltillo radio and television entrepreneur Alberto Jaubert and broadcast with 250 watts. By the end of the 1960s, XEZC had moved to Río Grande on 1450 kHz. After its 1972 acquisition by Radiodifusoras de Zacatecas, the 1980s saw XEZC move to 810 kHz with 1,000 watts day and 125 at night, later boosted to 1,000.

XEZC was cleared to move to FM in February 2011.
