= KBDJ-LP =

- Waterloo, Iowa; United States
- Frequency: 97.1 MHz
- Branding: KBDJ 97.1

Programming
- Format: Urban contemporary

Ownership
- Owner: Humanity's Hope Foundation, Inc.

Technical information
- Licensing authority: FCC
- Facility ID: 196323
- Class: LP1
- ERP: 100 watts
- HAAT: −7 metres (−23 ft)
- Transmitter coordinates: 42°29′53.3″N 92°20′04.1″W

Links
- Public license information: LMS
- Website: www.facebook.com/kbdj971

KBDJ-LP (97.1 FM, "KBDJ 97.1") is a radio station licensed to serve the community of Waterloo, Iowa. The station is owned by Humanity's Hope Foundation, Inc., and airs an urban contemporary format.

The station was assigned the KBDJ-LP call letters by the Federal Communications Commission on October 30, 2015.
