= George C. Hatch =

American media businessman

George C. Hatch (December 16, 1919, in Erie, Pennsylvania – August 30, 2009, in Salt Lake City, Utah) was an American businessman who owned several communications businesses and helped pioneer cable television. He was a founder of Western Microwave Inc., a precursor of Tele-Communications Inc., which spun off media conglomerate Liberty Media, and itself was purchased in 1999 by AT&T, and in turn sold to Charter Communications and then Comcast Corporation. He also championed the preservation of outdoor wilderness areas in the western United States, working with other Utah leaders to establish Capitol Reef and Arches National Parks, expand Glen Canyon National Recreation Area, and create Antelope Island State Park.

== Early years ==
Hatch married into a Utah family headed by Abraham Lincoln Glasmann, owner of the Ogden Standard-Examiner newspaper. Glasmann had become enthused about the future of radio and television, and in the late 1930s had acquired Ogden radio station KLO. Glasmann hired Hatch to manage the station in 1941.

In 1945 Hatch moved his family from Ogden to Salt Lake City, Utah to found radio station KALL (910 AM). In 1946, John F. Fitzpatrick, publisher of The Salt Lake Tribune (owned by the Kearns Corporation) representing the Tribune, purchased fifty percent interest in the station from the owners. The Tribune's interest (Kearns-Tribune, Corp.) sold its interest in 1954 to permit its owner (Kearns-Tribune, Corp.) to apply for a license to buy a television license and to purchase a fifty percent ownership in KUTV Channel 2. These two stations (KLO and KALL) eventually became the base for the Intermountain Network, a loose association of some 90 western US radio stations which shared the cost of leased circuits for the purpose of exchanging news and programming.

KUTV originally signed on in 1954 as Utah's ABC affiliate (in 1960 an NBC station), trading affiliations with KCPX-TV (now KTVX). The original co-owners were Frank C. Carman & Associates and The Salt Lake Tribune owned by the Kearns-Tribune Corporation. The deal was spearheaded by Tribune publisher John F. Fitzpatrick after his experience with two successful investments in local radio, including KSL (AM) and KALL. In 1956 the Carman group sold its interest to A.L. Glassman for the Ogden Standard-Examiner and his son-in-law and daughter, George and Gene Hatch. In the reorganization the Kearns-Tribune Corporation retained thirty-five percent interest until 1970.

In 1956 the Hatch family having established control of Salt Lake City television station KUTV joined with two partners including The Salt Lake Tribune and publisher John F. Fitzpatrick again to establish Western Microwave Inc. in Elko, Nevada, a forerunner to Tele-Communications Inc. (TCI), which became one of the largest cable-television providers in the US. The partners also established the TeleMation Inc. company in Salt Lake City, to manufacture equipment for the cable television industry.

== Personal life ==
Hatch married Wilda Gene Glasmann (who went by the name "Gene") in 1940. They had four children, all of whom survived him. His wife died in 2005. She had been an active partner in the family's business development, and was generally recognized as Hatch's business partner as well as his wife. From 1955 to 1993 she was Director of the Standard Corporation, which included the Odgen newspaper, the Salt Lake radio station, the Salt Lake television station, and other media-related businesses.

Hatch was an avid supporter of Utah's open areas (known as "redrock country"). Using his radio and television stations as their pulpit, Mr. and Mrs. Hatch fought to preserve the canyons and plateaus of southern Utah. They worked with U.S. Senator Frank Moss to establish Capitol Reef National Park and Arches National Park. They also worked to expand Glen Canyon National Recreation Area in northern Arizona, and to create Antelope Island State Park in the Salt Lake Valley.

Former SL Tribune publisher John W. Gallivan remembers Hatch as "one of the most intense business personalities" he ever met. He said "Hatch was a very, very serious person, all business. We had a great deal of trouble getting George to relax from business." Son Jeffrey Hatch stated, "He was very future oriented and very hard driving in terms of working toward the things he wanted to achieve. He was always working toward a vision of what he thought could be - rather than today's problems."
