= WMLO-LP =

- Live Oak, Florida; United States
- Frequency: 97.1 MHz

Ownership
- Owner: Melody Christian Radio

Technical information
- Licensing authority: FCC
- Facility ID: 133781
- Class: L1
- ERP: 100 watts
- HAAT: 23.1 meters (76 ft)
- Transmitter coordinates: 30°16′0.81″N 82°59′13.47″W

Links
- Public license information: LMS

WMLO-LP (97.1 FM) is a radio station licensed to Live Oak, Florida, United States. The station is currently owned by Melody Christian Radio.
