= WPCX-LP =

Radio station at Presbyterian College in Clinton, South Carolina

- Clinton, South Carolina; United States
- Broadcast area: Laurens County
- Frequency: 97.1 MHz

Programming
- Format: music, talk, news, college alternative
- Affiliations: bluehose media, bluestocking media

Ownership
- Owner: Presbyterian College

History
- First air date: 2002

Technical information
- Licensing authority: FCC
- Facility ID: 131284
- Class: L1
- ERP: 56 watts
- HAAT: 40.1 meters
- Transmitter coordinates: 34°27′56″N 81°52′27″W

Links
- Public license information: LMS
- Webcast: http://ingest2.cdnstream1.com:7080/2319_128.mp3
- Website: Official website

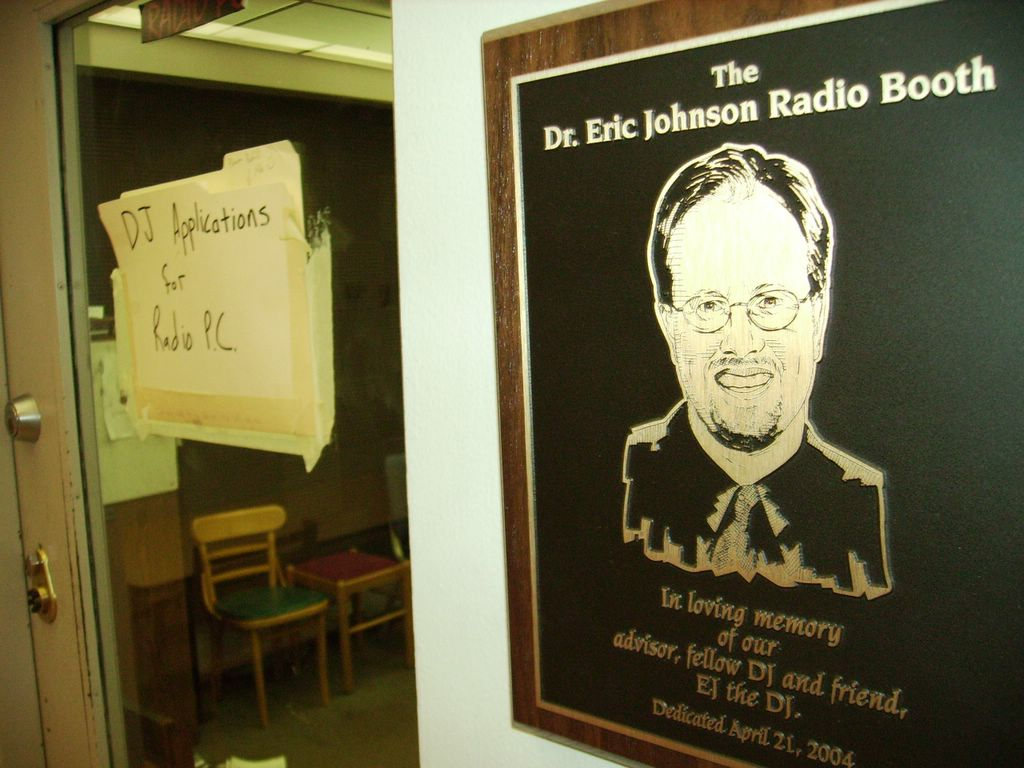

WPCX-LP is an FM college radio station run by students of Presbyterian College in Clinton, South Carolina. The station is broadcast from the Thomason Library on the college's campus.

The radio station relies on volunteers from the student body, college staff, and faculty to DJ in one-hour blocks. Though the station has only been transmitting radio waves for a few years, its history dates back further when the broadcasts would air on an on-campus cable television channel.

Began in 1990 as "Radio Free PC", a four-hour broadcast on WPCC 1410AM, the operation moved to the basement of the library in 1992 to operate on the campus cable TV. The campus-cable operation kept the name "Radio Free PC" and began an expanded nightly four-hour broadcast from 8 pm to midnight.

As a registered student organization, or RSO, WPCX has a faculty member as an advisor. Through 2003, Dr. Eric Johnson fulfilled this function; after his death, though, the station facility was named in the professor's memory.

In 2018, WPCX relocated to new studio space in the Media Services department at Presbyterian College. Dr. Philip Perdue, Director of Communication Studies, is currently the station's faculty/staff advisor.

In addition to the 97.1 FM frequency, the station can be accessed through live stream http://ingest2.cdnstream1.com:7080/2319_128.mp3 and also through the WPCX mobile app (Apple / Google).
