= WEPL-LP =

Coordinates: 43°10′30.9″N 77°37′6.15″W

- Rochester, New York; United States
- Broadcast area: Rochester
- Frequency: 98.5 MHz FM
- Branding: PODER 97.1

Programming
- Language: Spanish
- Format: Latin music and talk

Ownership
- Owner: Ibero-American Action League

History
- First air date: November 30, 2015; 10 years ago
- Call sign meaning: W El Poder Latino (Latino power)

Technical information
- Licensing authority: FCC
- Facility ID: 193382
- Class: L1
- ERP: 39 watts
- HAAT: 48 meters
- Translator: 97.1 W246EA (Rochester)

Links
- Public license information: LMS
- Website: ibero.org/poder

WEPL-LP (98.5 FM) is a low-power radio station based in Rochester, New York. The station is owned and operated by the Ibero-American Action League as a service to the Latino community in Rochester. The station, branded as PODER 97.1, features Latin music interspersed with Spanish-language news and talk. It began broadcasting in its current format on November 30, 2015.

In August 2023, the Ibero-American Action League entered into an agreement to purchase translator W298CH (107.5) from the WXXI Public Broadcasting Council pending FCC approval. The translator was used to boost WEPL's signal.
