= WJGR-LP =

WJGR-LP The Prowl
- Mobile, Alabama; United States
- Frequency: 97.1 MHz
- Branding: 97.1 The Prowl

Programming
- Format: Campus radio, variety

Ownership
- Owner: University of South Alabama

History
- First air date: February 21, 2014
- Call sign meaning: South Alabama Jaguars

Technical information
- Licensing authority: FCC
- Facility ID: 192964
- Class: L1
- ERP: 22 watts
- HAAT: 64 meters (210 ft)
- Transmitter coordinates: 30°41′30.10″N 88°10′56.30″W

Links
- Public license information: LMS
- Website: southalabama.edu/colleges/artsandsci/communication/studentmedia.html

WJGR-LP (97.1 FM) is a radio station licensed to the University of South Alabama in Mobile, Alabama. The station is student-run and airs a college radio format.
