= KUTV =

Television station in Salt Lake City

- Salt Lake City, Utah; United States
- Channels: Digital: 34 (UHF); Virtual: 2
- Branding: KUTV Channel 2; 2News

Programming
- Affiliations: 2.1: CBS; 2.2: Independent with MyNetworkTV; for others, see § Technical information and subchannels

Ownership
- Owner: Sinclair Broadcast Group; (KUTV Licensee, LLC)
- Sister stations: KJZZ-TV, KMYU

History
- First air date: September 11, 1954
- Former channel number: Analog: 2 (VHF, 1954–2009)
- Former affiliations: ABC (1954–1960); NBC (1960–1995)
- Call sign meaning: Utah Television

Technical information
- Licensing authority: FCC
- Facility ID: 35823
- ERP: 423 kW
- HAAT: 1,268.9 m (4,163 ft)
- Transmitter coordinates: 40°39′33″N 112°12′10″W
- Translator(s): see § Translators

Links
- Public license information: Public file; LMS
- Website: kutv.com

KUTV (channel 2) is a television station in Salt Lake City, Utah, United States, affiliated with CBS. It is owned by Sinclair Broadcast Group alongside two independent stations—KJZZ-TV (channel 14) and St. George–licensed KMYU (channel 12 or 2.2), which also airs MyNetworkTV programming. KUTV's studios are located on Main Street in the Wells Fargo Center in downtown Salt Lake City, with transmitter on Farnsworth Peak in the Oquirrh Mountains, southwest of Salt Lake City, and a large network of translators throughout Utah and in portions of Idaho, Nevada, and Wyoming.

KUTV was the third commercial TV station to start in Salt Lake City, and began broadcasting in September 1954. It was established when the Carman, Wrathall, and Kearns families merged their competing bids for a station, but the main owners during its first four decades were the family of George C. Hatch, who bought a minority stake in the station in 1956 and full ownership in 1971. Originally an ABC affiliate, it switched to NBC in 1960. The station became a solid runner-up in Utah's local news race behind KSL-TV, buoyed by popular on-air personnel such as meteorologist Mark Eubank and anchor Terry Wood. In 1979, the station was moved from downtown Salt Lake City into what became West Valley City.

After the Hatch family bought out other partners in the Ogden Standard-Examiner—which they owned—in 1989, their financial capacity became strained by debt service. KUTV lost Eubank to KSL-TV, and the Hatches sold 88 percent of the station to an investment group led by Veronis Suhler & Associates (VS&A). VS&A put the station on the market in 1994, ultimately selling its controlling interest to NBC, making it the second station in Utah to be owned and operated by a major network. Within months, it was traded to a joint venture of Westinghouse Broadcasting and CBS as part of a multi-city trade, leaving KUTV to switch to CBS in September 1995. It became a CBS owned-and-operated station after Westinghouse and CBS merged that November. News ratings briefly declined after the switch, but KUTV recovered to reclaim its previous position as a strong runner-up to KSL-TV. KUTV returned downtown in 2003 to its present studio location.

CBS sold its smaller-market stations in 2007 to Cerberus Capital Management, which formed Four Points Media Group to hold its television interests. In spite of the Great Recession and cutbacks in equipment and personnel, KUTV surpassed KSL-TV to become the market's news leader. During this time, KUSG, a rebroadcaster of KUTV in St. George, became a separate station and is today's KMYU, with broadcast coverage from KUTV's transmitters in the rest of the state. Sinclair Broadcast Group acquired Four Points in 2011 and expanded its Utah operation with its 2016 purchase of KJZZ-TV.

== History ==
=== Early years ===
In 1951, a draft revision of a new table of channel allocations suggested that the Federal Communications Commission (FCC) was not going to allocate further very high frequency (VHF) channels to Salt Lake City, leading two radio stations, KUTA and KALL, to lobby for its availability. Two stations were already on the air, having been authorized prior to the commission's 1948 freeze on station grants: KDYL-TV (now KTVX) on channel 4 and KSL-TV on channel 5. When the FCC ended the freeze on April 14, 1952, and issued a new table of allocations, channel 2 was restored to Salt Lake City. The commission received two applications in January 1953: one from KUTA's parent company, Utah Broadcasting and Television Corporation, and another from the Television Corporation of Utah, owned by the Kearns family and a subsidiary of the publisher of The Salt Lake Tribune. The two firms joined forces in March, each proposing to own half of the new station; this allowed them to avoid a potential comparative hearing. The station was projected to be an ABC affiliate, like KUTA radio, and planned to broadcast from the Oquirrh Mountains, from where the other stations already were broadcasting.

The FCC approved the construction permit on March 26, 1953, contingent on The Tribune divesting any ownership interest in KALL. Work began on facilities later that year. KUTA radio moved its headquarters to 179 Motor Avenue, which would also be used as the studio for channel 2, given the call sign KUTV. Motor Avenue, which regained its original name of Social Hall Avenue in 1954, had become the center of activity in Utah television; KSL-TV moved there in 1950, and after KUTA moved, KDYL radio and television announced plans to follow suit.

KUTV began test broadcasts on September 11, 1954, and the station held a dedication event on September 25 ahead of the start of the fall television season the next day. The Carman–Wrathall group that had owned KUTA and half of KUTV gave options to the Kearns-Tribune Corporation and the Standard-Examiner Publishing Corporation, publisher of the Ogden Standard-Examiner, to buy their properties in 1955. The two newspaper firms as well as George C. Hatch and his wife acquired KUTV under these options in a deal announced in December 1955 and approved in March 1956.

In its early years, KUTV was one of ABC's most successful affiliates; a Television Age study of the 1957–58 season found that KUTV had a sign-on-to-sign-off audience share of 41.8 percent, the second-highest of any ABC affiliate in the country. However, in May 1960, KUTV surprised local television observers by announcing it would switch network affiliations to NBC on October 2, leaving channel 4 (then KTVT) to pick up ABC. The change came even though ABC programming had been rating well on KUTV, but George C. Hatch noted that ABC provided no color programming at all, and the station was interested in expanding its color output and local news with NBC. Also cited by sources was a desire by KUTV for a Mountain Time Zone feed of network programming.

=== Hatch ownership ===
In 1970, the Kearns-Tribune Corporation traded its 35-percent stake in KUTV and two downtown office buildings for 40 percent of its outstanding stock that had been held by two descendants of Thomas Kearns residing in California. The Hatch family and Standard Corporation bought them out shortly thereafter, making KUTV entirely Utah-owned. In the decade that followed, growth in the news operation prompted the Hatches to seek a new studio location. It acquired the former headquarters of TeleMation on 3600 West and began broadcasting from the site in March 1979. This area, unincorporated at the time, became part of West Valley City in 1980.

KUTV played a key role for NBC in the distribution of programming to affiliates in other Mountain West states; all prime time shows for broadcast in Idaho and Montana went through KUTV's control room. In 1978, KUTV censored part of the miniseries Loose Change for air in the Salt Lake City market. An error and a shortage of video tape machines meant that viewers of KTVB in Boise, Idaho, inadvertently received the edited version. Management of the Boise station criticized KUTV for having "dictated" the alteration to the program.

=== Changing ownership ===
In 1989, the Standard Corporation announced a major reorganization in which the Hatch family assumed control of the company by buying shares from the Glasmann family. This transaction required borrowing and left the family with substantial debt service. During this time, per general manager Jeffrey Hatch, the television industry suffered from the cancellation of advertising for news coverage during the Gulf War and a downturn in the national economy. It marked the beginning of the end for the Hatch family's media ownership. The Standard-Examiner was sold to Sandusky Newspapers; KALL radio was sold; and George C. Hatch brokered a deal to sell a stake in KUTV to Veronis Suhler & Associates (VS&A), a New York–based investment banker.

In August 1993, KUTV Inc. and TeleScene, a production company owned by the Hatches, were merged into a new company that also included VS&A-owned WOKR in Rochester, New York. VS&A became the majority owner of the stations in the transaction. In June 1994, VS&A moved to put the properties up for sale to seek other business ventures.

=== Affiliation switch to CBS and move downtown ===
One month prior, in May 1994, a deal between Fox and New World Communications sparked a national realignment in network affiliations in markets across the country. As a result, valuations for network affiliates began to rise. Where KUTV had been rumored to be sold for about $70 million, by August reports suggested a sale price could exceed $100 million and that major station groups including Hearst and Scripps-Howard Broadcasting were interested. On August 16, NBC announced it would purchase VS&A's 88 percent controlling interest in KUTV, valuing the station and TeleScene at $109 million. This made KUTV the second owned-and-operated station in Salt Lake City; KSTU was owned by Fox at the time. It was by some margin the smallest station owned by NBC; Salt Lake City was the 37th largest market at the time. NBC expressed long-term interest in a possible regional cable news venture for the Rocky Mountain region between KUTV and the station it owned in Denver, KCNC-TV; it named KCNC president Roger Ogden, who had known the Hatches for years, to the transition team that would have integrated it into the stations group.

Almost as soon as KUTV's sale to NBC was announced, its future became uncertain because of developments elsewhere. In July, CBS and Westinghouse Broadcasting (Group W) had agreed to change Group W's five-station group to CBS affiliation. This included the Group W–owned NBC affiliate in Philadelphia, KYW-TV, where CBS already owned WCAU. CBS put WCAU on the market. However, when Fox bought its existing Philadelphia affiliate, NBC became the only logical buyer, and talks began in earnest over a swap of stations between the two networks. An August 26 headline on the front page of The Salt Lake Tribune noted "KUTV Now Pawn In Network Fight For Philly Station". A draft outline leaked to Mediaweek in early September had NBC offering KUTV and KCNC-TV to CBS, along with the channel 4 signal in Miami, in exchange for WCAU and the weaker channel 6 facility in Miami. Salt Lake City's existing CBS affiliate, KSL-TV, began negotiations with NBC. This was largely confirmed on November 21, 1994, with KUTV being sold to a partnership of Group W and CBS (with Group W holding controlling interest), even though the NBC purchase was still pending at the FCC. In December, KSL and NBC reached an affiliation agreement.

KUTV became a CBS affiliate on September 10, 1995. When it joined the network, viewers in Salt Lake City saw The Bold and the Beautiful for the first time, as KSL never carried the soap opera. One NBC program remained on KUTV's schedule: Saturday Night Live (SNL). KSL-TV aired SportsBeat Saturday, a sports highlights show, on Saturday late nights and did not pick up SNL. KUTV continued to air the program through January 1996. The remaining links to the Hatch era were severed after the switch. A new general manager, David Phillips, was installed; Jeffrey Hatch remained president through the end of 1995, and Diane Orr—another member of the Hatch family—was replaced as news director. In August, a month before the affiliation switch took effect, Westinghouse announced it would acquire CBS for $5.4 billion. The deal closed in November, making KUTV a CBS owned-and-operated station. TeleScene continued to be co-owned with the station until it was sold in 1999.

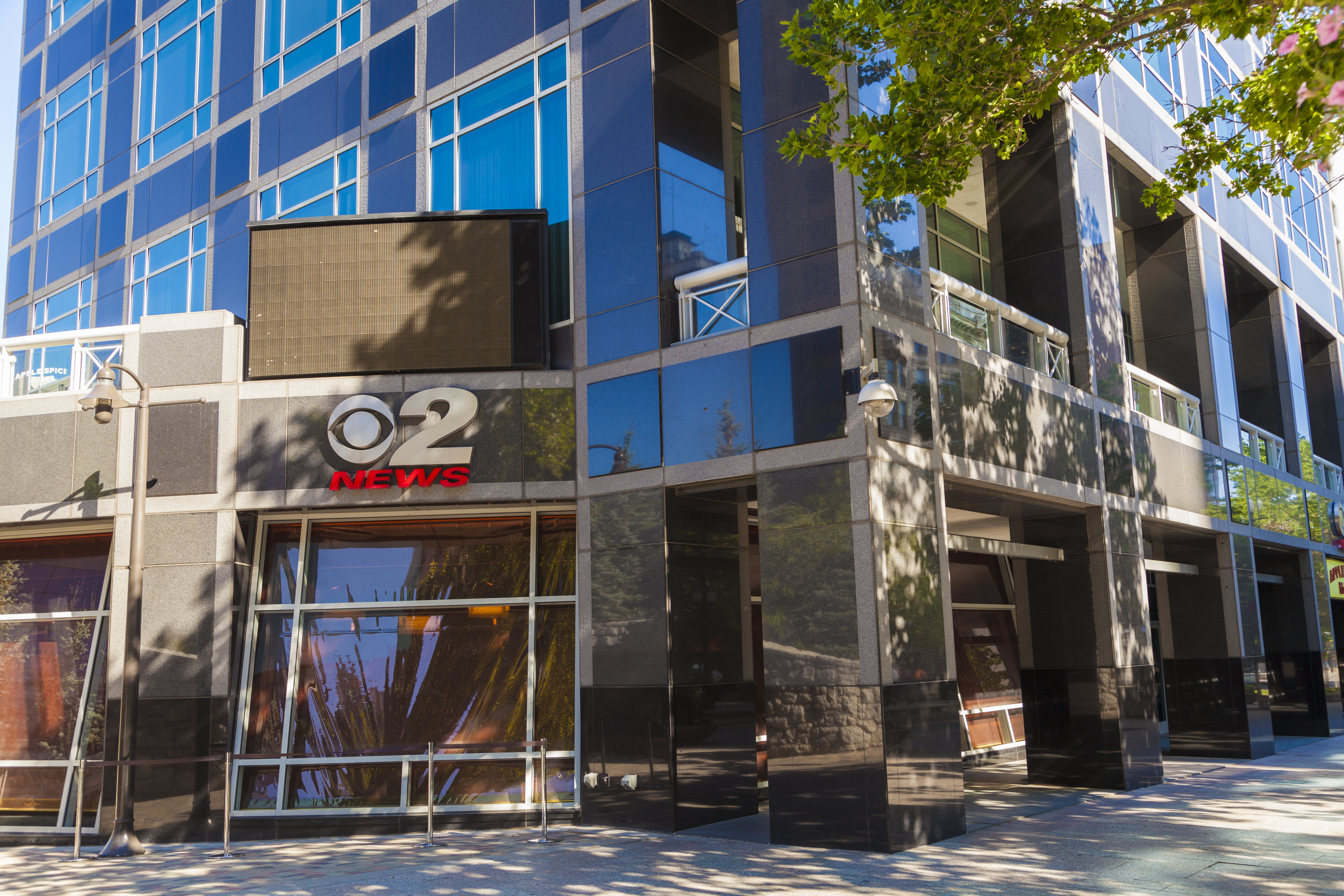
KUTV studio in the Wells Fargo Center in downtown Salt Lake City

Beginning in early 2002, the Redevelopment Agency of Salt Lake City began inquiring with local TV stations to see if any were interested in moving to studios on Main Street, which at the time was a priority for economic development. KUTV was the only interested station at the necessary cost, and with public and private funding, the station agreed in March 2003 to move to Wells Fargo Center. Beginning in October, the station began broadcasting from the building, with newscasts originating from a streetside studio.

=== Four Points and Sinclair ownership ===
CBS agreed to sell a package of smaller-market TV stations, including KUTV, in February 2007 to Cerberus Capital Management for $185 million. Cerberus formed a new holding company for the stations, Four Points Media Group, and closed on the deal on January 10, 2008. Under Four Points ownership, KUSG, a full-power satellite of KUTV in St. George, was split off as a separately programmed station. On March 20, 2009, Nexstar Broadcasting Group took over the management of Four Points under a three-year outsourcing agreement. KUTV was the largest station by market size owned by Four Points and the largest property Nexstar managed at the time.

Cerberus sold the Four Points stations to Sinclair Broadcast Group for $200 million in a deal announced in September 2011; Sinclair then began managing the stations (including WTVX, WTCN, WWHB, and WLWC) under local marketing agreements following antitrust approval by the Federal Trade Commission until the transaction was completed in January 2012. Sinclair expanded its Utah operation in 2016 by acquiring KJZZ-TV (channel 14), an independent station, from Larry H. Miller Communications Corporation.

On May 8, 2017, Sinclair entered into an agreement to acquire Tribune Media—owner of Fox affiliate KSTU—for $3.9 billion, plus the assumption of $2.7 billion in Tribune-held debt. As Sinclair already owned KUTV, KJZZ-TV, and KMYU (the former KUSG) in the market, the company offered to sell KSTU back to Fox Television Stations as part of a $910 million deal; Howard Stirk Holdings concurrently agreed to purchase KMYU. In July 2018, the FCC designated the transaction for hearing by an administrative law judge, and chairman Ajit Pai expressed "serious concerns" about Sinclair's planned divestitures. Tribune terminated the merger on August 9, 2018, making the KSTU sale proposal moot.

== News operation ==
KUTV's first news anchor was Doug Mitchell, who worked for the station from 1957 to 1984. Former KUTV news director Mike Youngren recalled Mitchell's "authoritative" style and ability to read the news without a script. The station's coverage of the 1965 crash of United Air Lines Flight 227 was cited by Youngren as defining for local TV news; KUTV newsfilm of the event was seen on NBC's Huntley-Brinkley Report. By early 1967, the station's newscasts were entirely in color. In 1971, the station won an Alfred I. duPont–Columbia University Award for a documentary, Warrior Without a Cause, profiling the Goshute tribe of Utah; a second came in 1980 for Clouds of Doubt, examining atomic testing in Nevada.

KUTV's newscasts spent the better part of five decades as a solid runner-up to dominant KSL-TV. Even though the two stations had little difference in news content, KSL's ownership by the Church of Jesus Christ of Latter-day Saints (LDS) shaped perceptions of KSL and its rival in turn. In 1979, KUTV general manager Robert Temple noted that faithful LDS Church members often considered it their duty to watch the news on KSL; in turn, KUTV tended to have a strong preference among non-LDS viewers. After a period in which KSL-TV dominated the ratings, KUTV spent most of the late 1970s and early 1980s in a neck-and-neck contest with KSL, with KTVX a distant third. The KUTV news viewer was younger and more affluent than their KSL-TV counterpart, enabling channel 2 to charge higher advertising rates within its newscasts. One factor in the rise was the development of a homegrown meteorologist talent in Mark Eubank, who joined the station in 1967; Eubank's counterpart at KSL-TV, Bob Welti, admitted in a 1980 interview that, after seeing tapes of meteorologists in other markets, Eubank was the best in the country. Another was the popularity of KUTV's main anchor in the 1970s and early 1980s, Terry Wood, who started at KUTV in 1971 and proved popular with local viewers until he departed in 1984 for a job at WSB-TV in Atlanta. Wood's departure prompted changes in KUTV's anchor lineup. Wood was succeeded as KUTV's top anchorman by Randall Carlisle, a reporter and anchor at the station since 1981; he was joined by Michelle King on the evening newscasts. Carlisle remained until 1988.

Mark was the franchise. It would have been advisable to promise him anything, pay him anything—make any deal.

— Jack Gallivan Jr., former KUTV news director, on the cost to the station of Mark Eubank departing for KSL

Mark Eubank departed in June 1989 after signing a contract with KSL-TV and its parent, Bonneville International Corporation, though a non-compete clause in his contract kept him from appearing on KSL-TV until early 1991. The move came as morale and pay at KUTV were low due to the Hatch family's financial reverses. The departure was a significant loss for KUTV; Harold Schindler of The Salt Lake Tribune called it the most devastating talent raid in local television since KSL-TV poached Bob Welti and Paul James from channel 4 (then known as KCPX-TV), a move that allowed KSL-TV to surge ahead as Utah's news leader. When Eubank debuted on KSL-TV at the start of 1991, KUTV fell eight rating points and KSL rose four, blunting a challenge channel 2 had been posing in the late 1980s. This was in spite of rehiring Terry Wood, who returned to Utah after a stint in New Orleans. Though channel 2 continued to command a healthy lead in morning news and at noon and ran closer in early evening news, KUTV fell back to a weaker second-place versus KSL-TV after the Eubank hiring. Facing a challenge from KTVX, KUTV hired its former anchor, Phil Riesen, in 1993 and recovered some of its lost viewership.

Ahead of the 1995 affiliation switch, KUTV was fending off a challenge from an advancing KTVX. The change to CBS came at a time when that network was weaker than NBC in the ratings. KUTV's late news viewership declined by about a third after the switch, owing to poor lead-in programming from CBS, but ratings in other time periods held steady. After the introduction of metered rankings to the Salt Lake City market in late 1996, KUTV slipped to third place at 11 p.m.

The station retooled its anchor lineup in 1996 and 1997; Wood's contract was not renewed, and he was replaced nearly a year later by Mark Koelbel. The 5 and 6 p.m. newscasts were replaced with a combined hour at 5. Through this period, KUTV continued to be a solid number-two in late news to KSL, whose newscasts were among the highest-rated in major markets. The challenge from KTVX faded as that station underwent newsroom and ownership turnover. KUTV's strength in mornings was such that CBS let the station air a local newscast at 7 a.m. in lieu of the first hour of The Early Show. King departed in 2007 after 29 years at KUTV, including 23 in evening news.

Between 2008 and 2009, KUTV served as the producing station for a local newscast on Four Points–owned WTVX serving West Palm Beach, Florida. The half-hour CW West Palm News at Ten was produced using local reporters in the market—with a total of 30 West Palm Beach-based staff—and news and weather presenters at KUTV.

Over the course of the late 2000s and early 2010s, KUTV narrowed the ratings gap with KSL before surpassing it. KUTV narrowly edged KSL in seven-day news ratings in May 2006, and though its ratings dipped after King's departure, the station rebounded. In the November 2008 Nielsen survey, the gap between the two stations at 10 p.m. shrank to one percent of the audience, and two years later, they tied at 10 p.m. The 10 p.m. ratings shift was the last step in a process that had been going on for years; Scott D. Pierce noted in The Salt Lake Tribune, "The truth is that [KSL] hasn't been No. 1 in much of anything other than the 10 p.m. news for quite some time." This rise occurred amid a backdrop of cuts during the Great Recession, which included two rounds of layoffs and the non-renewal of its news helicopter lease that August. Meanwhile, as KSL suffered in the ratings under a shift to a softer, values-based news format, KUTV widened its ratings lead; in February 2012, KUTV had more 10 p.m. news viewers than KSL and KTVX combined, and it led in almost all time slots.

While KUTV continued to lead in households, KSTU built a substantial franchise with younger viewers. As early as 2014, KUTV was leading in households at 10 p.m. but third in viewers aged 25–54 behind KSL and KSTU. By 2022, KSL had surpassed KUTV in household ratings.

KUTV also produces newscasts for KJZZ-TV. From 2005 to 2010, when KUTV provided operational assistance to channel 14 under a local marketing agreement, the station produced weekday morning 9 a.m. and nightly 9 p.m. newscasts for KJZZ-TV. In 2017, KUTV launched the 8 a.m. hour of its morning newscast for KJZZ. The 7 a.m. hour moved from KUTV to KJZZ in 2018 when a new affiliation agreement required KUTV to clear the entirety of CBS This Morning.

=== Notable current staff ===
- David Osmond – host of Fresh Living, 2021–present

=== Notable former on-air staff ===
- Kathy Brock – anchor/reporter, 1984–1990
- Christianne Klein – 4 p.m. anchor, 2003–2005
- Ric Romero – PM Magazine host, 1982–1985
- John Stehr – anchor, 1982–1989

== Technical information and subchannels ==
The KUTV transmitter is on Farnsworth Peak. The station's signal is multiplexed:

Subchannels of KUTV
Subchannel	Res.	Short name	Programming
2.1	1080i	KUTV2	CBS
2.2	720p	KMYU	KMYU (Independent with MyNetworkTV)
2.3	480i	Comet	Comet
2.4	480i	Charge!	Charge!

Simulcast of subchannels of another station

On April 8, 2009, KUTV began carrying This TV on its second subchannel, including Real Salt Lake soccer. By 2010, this service was a simulcast of the main channel of KUSG (now KMYU) in St. George.

=== Analog-to-digital conversion ===
Though KUTV was part of the DTV Utah consortium that built a common transmitter site for most Salt Lake City–market digital broadcasting, it did not begin to provide a digital signal until January 15, 2002. KUTV shut down its analog signal, over VHF channel 2, on June 12, 2009, as part of the federally mandated transition from analog to digital television; most of the state's broadcasters opted to wait until the rescheduled June date. KUTV's digital signal remained on its pre-transition UHF channel 34.

=== Translators ===
KUTV is additionally rebroadcast over a network of low-power translator stations:

- Kanarraville, etc.: K02KN-D
- Cedar Canyon: K05NG-D
- Helper: K07AAA-D
- Roosevelt, etc.: K07AAB-D
- Long Valley Junction: K07ZT-D
- Sigurd–Salina: K07ZV-D
- Marysvale: K07ZW-D
- Woodland–Kamas: K07ZX-D
- East Price: K07ZZ-D
- Hildale, etc.: K08PC-D
- Blanding–Monticello: K08PY-D
- Aurora, etc.: K08QA-D
- Cedar City: K09CJ-D
- Ruth, NV: K09DW-D
- Ely–McGill, NV: K09EA-D
- Lund–Preston, NV: K10BU-D
- Santa Clara: K10RP-D
- Toquerville: K11VY-D
- Eureka, NV: K14OB-D
- Wanship: K14QS-D
- Rural Sevier County: K14QY-D
- Teasdale–Torrey: K14RA-D
- Richfield, etc.: K14RC-D
- Koosharem: K14RD-D
- Panguitch: K14RE-D
- Henrieville: K14RH-D
- Nephi: K14RI-D
- Samak: K14RL-D
- Laketown, etc.: K14RM-D
- Fruitland: K14RT-D
- Park City: K15FL-D
- Hatch: K15HE-D
- Mount Pleasant: K15HG-D
- Green River: K15HH-D
- Coalville: K15KQ-D
- Garfield, etc.: K15KS-D
- Orangeville: K15LQ-D
- Mayfield: K16HV-D
- Utahn: K18JU-D
- Wendover: K18KC-D
- Enterprise: K18MC-D
- Bluff & area: K18MQ-D
- Montezuma Creek–Aneth: K18MR-D
- Circleville: K19GM-D
- Virgin: K19HQ-D
- Mexican Hat, etc.: K19IG-D
- Orderville: K19KQ-D
- Leamington: K19MA-D
- Summit County: K20ND-D
- Beaver, etc.: K22FS-D
- Navajo Mountain School, etc.: K22IE-D
- Oljeto: K22IF-D
- Spring Glen: K22JZ-D
- Scipio–Holden: K22NC-D
- Kanarraville: K24MY-D
- Huntsville, etc.: K25IX-D
- Cortez, CO: K25QS-D
- Fishlake Resort: K26NV-D
- Kanab: K26NY-D
- Beryl–Modena–Newcastle: K27GB-D
- Manti, etc.: K28JN-D
- Hanksville: K28OK-D
- Escalante: K28OM-D
- Preston, ID: K29EY-D
- Vernal, etc.: K29LB-D
- Morgan, etc.: K30JB-D
- Fountain: K30KK-D
- Duchesne: K30LF-D
- Manila, etc.: K30LY-D
- Capitol Reef National Park: K30ON-D
- Caineville: K30OO-D
- Fremont: K30OQ-D
- Tropic–Cannonville: K30OT-D
- Montpelier, ID: K31CI-D
- Hanna, etc.: K31JB-D
- Boulder: K31JF-D
- Scofield: K31JN-D
- Rockville: K31JX-D
- LeChee, etc., AZ: K31KS-D
- Spring Glen, etc.: K31MC-D
- Rural Garfield County: K31NP-D
- Henefer, etc.: K31OD-D
- Delta, etc.: K31OJ-D
- Beaver, etc.: K31OK-D
- Parowan–Enoch, etc.: K32AG-D
- Ely, NV: K32CJ-D
- Alton: K32LZ-D
- Peoa–Oakley: K33JG-D
- Clear Creek: K34KP-D
- Logan: K34OI-D
- Heber–Midway: K35EW-D
- Antimony: K35NJ-D
- Randolph–Woodruff: K35NN-D
- Garrison, etc.: K36IR-D
- Fillmore, etc.: K36KI-D
- Emery: K36PC-D
- Green River: K36PD-D
- Ferron: K36PF-D
- Huntington: K36PG-D
