= XHHLL-FM (Oaxaca) =

Radio station in Salina Cruz, Oaxaca, Mexico

- Salina Cruz, Oaxaca; Mexico
- Frequency: 97.1 MHz
- Branding: Los 40

Programming
- Format: Top 40
- Affiliations: Radiópolis

Ownership
- Owner: CMI Oaxaca; (Sucesión de Humberto Alejandro López Lena Robles)

History
- Former call signs: XEHLL-AM
- Former frequencies: 550 kHz
- Call sign meaning: Owner Humberto López Lena

Technical information
- ERP: 10 kW

Links
- Webcast: Listen live
- Website: encuentroradiotv.com

XHHLL-FM is a radio station on 97.1 FM in Salina Cruz, Oaxaca, Mexico carrying the Los 40 format.

== History ==
The concession for XEUC-AM was awarded to Eduardo Martínez Celis in 1962. In the 1980s, Humberto Alejandro López Lena Robles bought the station; he changed its calls to XEHLL-AM "Radio Mar" in 1991 and moved it from Tehuantepec to Salina Cruz. XEHLL became an AM-FM combo with the award of XHHLL-FM in 1994 and began calling itself "Estéreo Mar". The station became FM-only when it surrendered the AM concession in a letter dated June 30, 2023.
