= KAYQ =

- Warsaw, Missouri; United States
- Frequency: 97.1 MHz
- Branding: The Lake

Programming
- Format: Country
- Affiliations: Dial Global

Ownership
- Owner: Sticks Media; (Sticks Media)

History
- First air date: 1980

Technical information
- Licensing authority: FCC
- Facility ID: 69667
- Class: A
- ERP: 6,000 watts
- HAAT: 73.0 meters
- Transmitter coordinates: 38°17′19″N 93°18′32″W

Links
- Public license information: Public file; LMS
- Website: www.971thelake.com

KAYQ (97.1 FM, "The Lake") is a radio station broadcasting a Country / Yacht Rock hybrid format, licensed to Warsaw, Missouri, United States. The station was established in 1980 and owned by Valkyrie Broadcasting until February 2025, when Todd Nixon's Sticks Media bought the station for $135,000. KAYQ was the third station to be obtained by Sticks Media.

On March 17th, 2025, Sticks Media fully relaunched 97.1 The Lake's presence in Missouri's Truman Lake region with a new website, dedicated social media pages, a new on-air schedule featuring Kenny Treece (Treecerman) in mornings and Todd Nixon in afternoons, and a musical shift from classic country to country variety with a "yacht" presence. The station's tagline is "Come on in, the music's fine!"
