= XHCHH-FM (Guerrero) =

Radio station in Zumpango del Río, Guerrero, Mexico

- Zumpango, Guerrero; Mexico
- Broadcast area: Chilpancingo, Guerrero
- Frequency: 97.1 MHz
- Branding: Lokura FM Grupera

Programming
- Format: Regional Mexican

Ownership
- Owner: Capital Media; (Radiodifusoras Capital, S.A. de C.V.)

History
- First air date: October 7, 1993 (concession)
- Former call signs: XECHH-AM (1993–2019)
- Former frequencies: 650 kHz (1993–2019)
- Call sign meaning: From Chichihualco (original location of station made available)

Technical information
- Class: A
- ERP: 1,000 watts
- HAAT: 365.1 meters
- Transmitter coordinates: 17°33′59″N 99°27′59″W

Links
- Website: lokurafm.com/chilpancingo

XHCHH-FM is a radio station in Zumpango, Guerrero, licensed to the state capital of Chilpancingo. Broadcasting on 97.1 FM, XHCHH is owned by Capital Media and carries a Regional Mexican format known as Lokura FM Grupera.

== History ==
The concession for XECHH-AM 650 was awarded to Luis Carlos Mendiola Codina in 1993. The next year, the station obtained its FM counterpart. Capital Media acquired XECHH/XHCHH in 2004. The AM station broadcast with 5,000 watts during the day and 250 watts at night.

Capital Media surrendered the 650 AM frequency to the IFT in a letter dated June 25, 2019.

Like most Capital Media stations, XHCHH adopted the new Lokura FM Spanish-language adult hits format in 2020. Lokura FM was split into rock, pop, and Regional Mexican brands in 2023, with the Regional Mexican format being installed at XHCHH.
