= KAAZ-FM =

- Spanish Fork, Utah; United States
- Broadcast area: Salt Lake City metropolitan area
- Frequency: 106.7 MHz} (HD Radio)
- Branding: Rock 106-7

Programming
- Format: Mainstream rock
- Subchannels: HD2: TikTok Radio

Ownership
- Owner: iHeartMedia, Inc.; (iHM Licenses, LLC)
- Sister stations: KJMY, KNRS, KNRS-FM, KODJ, KZHT

History
- First air date: November 1, 1967
- Former call signs: KONI-FM (1967–1980); KTMP (1980–1984); KBHV (1984–1987); KBER (1987–1990); KQOL (1990–1994); KUJJ (1994–1995); KBKK (1995–1997); KOSY (1997–2002); KOSY-FM (2002–2013)
- Former frequencies: 106.3 MHz (1967–1990); 106.5 MHz (1990–2015)

Technical information
- Licensing authority: FCC
- Facility ID: 63536
- Class: C
- ERP: 25,000 watts
- HAAT: 1,140 meters (3,740 ft)
- Transmitter coordinates: 40°39′34″N 112°12′5″W

Links
- Public license information: Public file; LMS
- Webcast: Listen live (via iHeartRadio); HD2: Listen live (via iHeartRadio)
- Website: rock1067.iheart.com

KAAZ-FM (106.7 FM, "Rock 106.7") is a mainstream rock formatted radio station broadcasting to the Salt Lake City metropolitan area. The station's city of license is Spanish Fork, Utah. The station is owned by iHeartMedia, Inc.. The station's studios are located in West Valley City and its transmitter site is located southwest of the city on Farnsworth Peak in the Oquirrh Mountains.

The station’s playlist has an emphasis of 90s and 2000s rock music along with some 70s and 80s rock and some recent 2020s rock.

== History ==
=== Country: 1967-1984 ===
KAAZ-FM began broadcasting on 106.3 MHz as KTMP, the original format mainly being country, from a transmitter on Lake Mountain, closer to its current city of license (Spanish Fork).

=== Adult contemporary: 1984-1986 ===
In 1984, the frequency was changed to 106.5 MHz, the station's call sign was changed to KBHV, and the format was changed to adult contemporary.

=== Rock: 1986-1990 ===
It became the original home of rock station KBER in 1986, which moved down the dial to 101.1 MHz in 1990, replacing contemporary jazz KDAB, and relocated its transmitter to Farnsworth Peak.

=== Adult contemporary: 1990-1992 ===
With the KBER station move completed, the station was then assigned the callsign KQOL on March 20, 1990. Originally stunting by playing a mix of adult contemporary and country, it officially switched to an Adult Contemporary format in November of that year.

=== Sports: 1992-1993 ===
In June 1992, KQOL switched its format to all-sports as "106.5 The Score". For several days, they used the calls KSRE, which it was found that someone had not properly filed for. (Initially, the sports format ran the format with the KQOL calls.) It was Utah's first sports radio station, as well as the first in the country to broadcast on the FM band.

=== Country: 1993-1997 ===
In September 1993, the station adopted a country music format after it lost advertisers to AM station KISN (570 AM, now KNRS). The station simulcast the country music format of KMXB (107.5 FM, now KKLV). In December 1993, the station began simulcasting the country music programming of KRGQ (1550 AM) and KRGQ-FM (107.9 FM). On March 1, 1994, the station changed its call sign to KUJJ, and again changed its call sign on August 22, 1995, to KBKK, known as "K-Buck".

=== Soft adult contemporary: 1997-2012 ===
In December 1997, KBKK flipped to soft adult contemporary; on December 31, 1997, the callsign became KOSY. Before flipping to 106.5 MHz, KOSY was simulcast on what is now KEGH in Brigham City to fill in the gaps created from Lake Mountain. KENZ and KKLV suffer from the same signal problems to date. Most of KOSY-FM's programming had been automated since late 2000.

Programming on KOSY included a local program hosted by "Fisher and Peggy", Donny Osmond's Eight Track Playback, Lori Bradley, Delilah, and several other local and voice tracked programs. Weekend special programming included "Show Tunes Saturday Night", dedicated to Broadway music, and a "Sounds of the Sabbath" program.

KOSY was one of the few remaining soft AC stations in the United States until going in a more mainstream direction in June 2009, when the station dropped the calls for its branding and identified themselves as "Today's 106.5".

==== Christmas music ====
From 2006 to 2008, KOSY laid claim to being among the first non-stunting stations in America to change over to Christmas music for the season, traditionally changing formats at midnight local time on November 1. They were first in 2006 upon changing on October 30, and in 2007, they were second, having been beaten by KCKC in Kansas City, Missouri by only a few hours (though WEXM in Indianapolis had been stunting with Christmas music as the "in-between" format since October 8). KOSY again changed formats at midnight local time November 1, 2008, good for third place, this time behind classic hits WRIT-FM and hot AC WMYX-FM, two rival stations in Milwaukee; these stations changed on October 31 at 3:13 and 3:21 p.m. local time respectively. (WMVN in St. Louis changed on October 10 of that year but again, used the format as an in-between format between its format change.)

In 2009, due to November 1 landing on a Sunday, KOSY forwent their move and continued airing their usual "Sounds of the Sabbath" that day.

KOSY switched to Christmas music on November 4, 2010 at 5:00 p.m. local time, earlier than most stations but several days after the other first-in-the-nation stations. KOSY changed on the same date in 2011, this time at 8 a.m. local time. For 2012, the station changed on November 2 at 6:00 a.m.

Following the station's flip to rock music in 2012, iHeartMedia (then still known as Clear Channel Communications) moved its annual Christmas music format to sister station KJMY. The tradition of unusually early Christmas music in the Salt Lake region would eventually be revived in 2025 by KLO-FM, initially as a stunt and then on a more permanent basis in 2026. Both stations compete against market leader KSFI.

=== Rock: 2012-present ===
On December 21, 2012, after playing Rod Stewart's "Let it Snow", the station flipped its format to classic rock, branded as "Rock 106-5", launching with Boston's "Peace of Mind". (With the change, the 'Sounds of the Sabbath' program moved to KMGR in Richfield.) On March 1, 2013, KOSY changed their call letters to KAAZ-FM.

former logo, 2012-2015

At Noon on August 6, 2015, KAAZ changed its broadcast frequency to 106.7 MHz. The logo for the new "Rock 106-7" was already being used on the station's website for about a week beforehand. The station was licensed to broadcast on 106.7 MHz on August 28, 2015.

Over the years, KAAZ-FM shifted to a mainstream rock direction, adding more modern rock songs to its playlist, and adding more rock hits from the 90s and 2000s.
