= KCHP-LP =

- Arcata, California; United States
- Frequency: 97.1 MHz

Programming
- Format: Contemporary Christian

Ownership
- Owner: Calvary Chapel of Arcata

Technical information
- Licensing authority: FCC
- Facility ID: 124464
- Class: L1
- ERP: 93 watts
- HAAT: −41.2 meters (−135 ft)
- Transmitter coordinates: 40°52′32″N 124°05′21″W

Links
- Public license information: LMS
- Website: telioschurch.com/kchpradio

KCHP-LP (97.1 FM) is a radio station licensed to Arcata, California, United States. The station is currently owned by Calvary Chapel of Arcata.
