= WICE-LP =

- Hendersonville, North Carolina; United States
- Frequency: 97.1 MHz

Programming
- Language: Spanish
- Format: religious

Ownership
- Owner: (EBENEZER PENTECOSTAL RADIO SERVICE)

Technical information
- Licensing authority: FCC
- Facility ID: 134678
- Class: L1
- ERP: 100 watts
- HAAT: 30 meters
- Transmitter coordinates: 35°16′35″N 82°23′57″W

Links
- Public license information: LMS
- Website: ebenezer97-1.com

WICE-LP is a low-power F.M. radio station licensed to operate on 97.1 MHz at Hendersonville, North Carolina by the Federal Communications Commission. It was assigned the WICE-LP callsign on July 15, 2009.
