= KAYV =

- Crested Butte, Colorado; United States
- Frequency: 97.1 MHz
- Branding: The Cave

Programming
- Format: Classic rock

Ownership
- Owner: Arkansas Valley Broadcasting, Inc.

Technical information
- Licensing authority: FCC
- Facility ID: 189566
- Class: A
- ERP: 300 watts
- HAAT: −211 metres (−692 ft)
- Transmitter coordinates: 38°54′10″N 106°58′22″W
- Translators: 98.7 K254BB (Gunnison); 99.5 K258BI (Gunnison)

Links
- Public license information: Public file; LMS

KAYV (97.1 FM) is a radio station licensed to serve the community of Crested Butte, Colorado. The station is owned by Arkansas Valley Broadcasting, Inc. It airs a classic rock format.

The station was assigned the KAYV call letters by the Federal Communications Commission on September 22, 2011.
