= KZBR =

Radio station in La Jara, Colorado

- La Jara, Colorado; United States
- Frequency: 97.1 MHz
- Branding: The Zebra

Programming
- Format: Adult Hits

Ownership
- Owner: William Spears, Jr.; (Wolf Creek Broadcasting, LLC)

History
- First air date: 2008
- Former call signs: KABD (2007–2007)
- Call sign meaning: K ZeBRa (Zebra branding)

Technical information
- Licensing authority: FCC
- Facility ID: 162292
- Class: C3
- ERP: 25,000 watts
- HAAT: 55 meters (180 ft)
- Transmitter coordinates: 37°22′05″N 106°06′46″W

Links
- Public license information: Public file; LMS
- Webcast: Listen live
- Website: KZBR Online

KZBR (97.1 FM, "The Zebra") is a radio station broadcasting an adult hits music format. Licensed to La Jara, Colorado, United States, the station is currently owned by William Spears, Jr., through licensee Wolf Creek Broadcasting, LLC.
