= KNRS (AM) =

- Salt Lake City, Utah; United States
- Broadcast area: Salt Lake City metropolitan area
- Frequency: 570 kHz
- Branding: Talk Radio 105.9 FM/570 AM KNRS

Programming
- Format: Talk radio
- Affiliations: 24/7 News; Fox News Radio; Compass Media Networks; Premiere Networks

Ownership
- Owner: iHeartMedia, Inc.; (iHM Licenses, LLC)
- Sister stations: KAAZ-FM; KJMY; KNRS-FM; KODJ; KZHT

History
- First air date: August 1, 1938
- Former call signs: KUTA (1938–1956); KLUB (1956–1989); KISN (1989–1998); KNRS (1998–2009); KACP (2009–2010)
- Former frequencies: 1500 kHz (1938–1942)
- Call sign meaning: "News Radio Station"

Technical information
- Licensing authority: FCC
- Facility ID: 63818
- Class: B
- Power: 5 kW (unlimited)
- Transmitter coordinates: 40°49′8.8″N 111°55′58.8″W
- Repeater: 105.9 KNRS-FM (Centerville)

Links
- Public license information: Public file; LMS
- Webcast: Listen live (via iHeartRadio)
- Website: knrs.iheart.com

One of two massive KNRS-AM transmitter towers, located in Salt Lake City, Utah

KNRS (570 kHz) is a commercial AM radio station licensed to Salt Lake City, Utah. Owned by iHeartMedia, KNRS and sister station KNRS-FM simulcast a talk radio format. The studios are located in West Valley City and the transmitter site is located off West 2300 North Street in Salt Lake City.

== History ==
The station signed on the air on August 1, 1938, as KUTA on 1500 kHz, and was then headed by Utah broadcasting pioneer Frank Carman. In 1956, the station changed its call letters to KLUB. After the station became KLUB in 1956, its programming consisted on music, news, and sports. In the 1950s, KLUB published a local top 40 chart. The station aired a beautiful music format in the 1970s. In the early 1980s, the station aired a middle of the road music format. In September 1983, the station began airing the "Music of Your Life" nostalgia format. On September 4, 1985, the station's format was changed to adult contemporary. In Autumn 1985, KLUB became the flagship station for the Utah Jazz of the National Basketball Association.

On May 15, 1989, the station's call sign was changed to KISN, and the station began simulcasting the classic hits format of 97.1 KISN-FM. The simulcast ended in September 1992. On September 1, 1993, the station's format was changed to sports talk and was branded as "Sports Radio 570", making it Utah's second all-sports radio station (after KQOL, now KAAZ-FM). The station became the market's only sports talk station later in the month, when KQOL switched to a country music format. On July 31, 1997, the sports format ended and the station began simulcasting "Timeless" adult standards format of 107.9 KRKR.

On January 9, 1998, after being sold to Jacor Communications, the station's call letters became KNRS, standing for "News Radio Station", and the station adopted a news/talk format. The station's branding was "570 K-News", and it was an ABC News Radio affiliate radio station. On March 6, 2000, KNRS became known as "Family Values Talk Radio", and the station adopted an almost entirely syndicated talk radio format, carrying programming such as The Rush Limbaugh Show and Dr. Laura. In 2003, it was renamed to KNRS AM 570, and the slogan was "Depend on it". In 2005, KNRS changed affiliates from ABC News Radio to Fox News Radio.

In January 2009, KNRS, began simulcasting its programming on FM HD Radio on KODJ 94.1 HD-2. On August 3, 2009, Clear Channel moved the talk programming airing on 570 over to 105.7 on the FM dial. For about six weeks, both 570 and 105.7 were simulcast.

KNRS' call sign was changed to KACP on September 1, 2009. On September 17, 2009, KACP split off in a more business-oriented direction as "Freedom 570", with a lineup including Cox Radio hosts Neal Boortz and Clark Howard as well as Clear Channel in-house shows Jason Lewis, The Schnitt Show and Handel on the Law. KACP also broadcast on an FM translator in Utah County on 99.1 FM, and KJMY HD-2 up until March 2010, when 99.1 and KJMY HD-2 switched formats to classic country. Though 99.1 is a translator, through a loophole in Federal Communications Commission (FCC) regulations, the station can broadcast an HD-2 feed. KACP was then no longer available on the FM dial, until switching back to KNRS.

On December 23, 2010, the station changed its calls back to KNRS and began simulcasting its sister FM signal. The station obtained a construction permit from the FCC for a power increase to 50,000 watts day and 5,000 watts night. However the construction permit expired before the upgrade was built.

== Transmitter Information ==
The broadcasting office of KNRS is located in Salt Lake City, and the transmission site is located just northwest of Rose Park.

KNRS' towers are 2 massive directional transmission towers, with co-ordinates of 40°49′8.8″N 111°55′58.8″W (decimal: 40.819111° N, −111.933000° W).

KNRS' signal sits on the lower dial of AM at 570 kHz. The signal is associated with the lower Longwave part of the AM dial, below 810 kHz. At night, it can generate and receive The Luxembourg Effect, where signals will interfere with one another, despite frequency differences. They generate their audio very faintly on different stations by accident, with no control over it; it also only happens notably at night. However, higher on the AM and The Luxembourg effect disappears.
