= WIXL-LP =

- Madison, Wisconsin; United States
- Broadcast area: Madison
- Frequency: 97.1 MHz
- Branding: 97X

Programming
- Format: Christian rock

Ownership
- Owner: City Church

History
- First air date: August 2007

Technical information
- Licensing authority: FCC
- Facility ID: 132239
- Class: L1
- ERP: 75 watts
- HAAT: 34.7 meters (114 ft)
- Transmitter coordinates: 43°3′52.40″N 89°18′24.30″W

Links
- Public license information: LMS
- Webcast: Listen live
- Website: 97x.fm

WIXL-LP (97.1 FM) is a radio station licensed to Madison, Wisconsin, United States, the station serves the Madison area. The station is currently owned by City Church, Inc. It broadcasts a Christian rock format. After many delays, the station went on air just ahead of an FCC deadline.

Former logo
