= 24/7 News =

American radio network

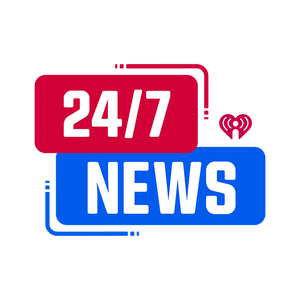
- Type: Radio network
- Broadcast area: United States

Programming
- Language(s): English
- Format: News
- Affiliations: NBC News (2016–present); ABC News Live (live special events only)

Ownership
- Owner: iHeartMedia
- Parent: Total Traffic and Weather Network
- Sister stations: 24/7 Sports; Black Information Network

History
- Founded: 1999; 27 years ago
- Launch date: October 2012; 13 years ago

Coverage
- Availability: National (through online, broadcast affiliates, and podcast)

Links
- Webcast: Listen live (via iHeartRadio)

24/7 News Source or 24/7 News is an American news radio service of iHeartMedia (formerly Clear Channel Communications) through its Total Traffic and Weather Network (TTWN) division. The service provides top of the hour news updates thru syndication to most iHeart-owned news/talk stations.

== History ==
=== Early years ===
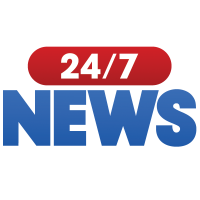
Former logo from 2012 to 2016.

The 24/7 News service began in 1999 as an audio news wire service when Clear Channel launched the Total Traffic and Weather Network subsidiary. It has 22 local news bureaus in 12 key cities.

The service began streaming on its own webcast channel in 2008 when Clear Channel launched the iHeartRadio platform. In 2012, TTWN/iHeart began soft-launched the 24/7 News radio network featuring national and local news provided by iHeart's TTWN and Metro Networks subsidiaries, syndicated to most of iHeart-owned stations in key large and medium-sized markets.

=== NBC News Radio ===
On July 11, 2016, NBCUniversal licensed the name "NBC News Radio" to iHeartMedia, using talent and reporters from iHeartMedia's existing 24/7 News Network, made available to the group's approximately 850 radio stations. The reintroduced service included an hourly newscast along with ancillary specials and longform breaking news coverage.

In 2024, the webcast channel and podcast has been reverted to the 24/7 News brand. However, the webcast/podcast will continue to use news reports outsourcing from NBC News.

== Programming and syndication ==
24/7 News provides top- and bottom-hour newscast on both terrestrial/syndication, webcast and podcast, using sources from NBC News and iHeart's own TTWN subsidiary. Similar to Westwood One News, iHeart uses the unbranded version of the newscast for radio stations.

In addition, the network's online webcast also streams major breaking news/developing story and special events, such as State of the Union speech and election coverage (although both are outsourced from ABC News Live).
