= KSMR-LP =

- Great Falls, Montana; United States
- Frequency: 97.1 MHz

Ownership
- Owner: Saint Michael Radio, Inc.

Technical information
- Licensing authority: FCC
- Facility ID: 133297
- Class: L1
- ERP: 29 watts
- HAAT: 54.1 meters
- Transmitter coordinates: 47°32′01″N 111°15′34″W
- Translator: (107.9 MHz) K300BH (Great Falls)

Links
- Public license information: LMS

KSMR-LP (97.1 FM) is a radio station licensed to Great Falls, Montana, United States. The station is currently owned by Saint Michael Radio, Inc.

== Translators ==
Call sign	Frequency	City of license	FID	ERP (W)	Class	FCC info
K300BH	107.9 FM	Great Falls, Montana	150145	140	D	LMS
