= KZHT =

Contemporary hit radio station in Salt Lake City

- Salt Lake City, Utah; United States
- Broadcast area: Salt Lake City Metropolitan Area
- Frequency: 97.1 MHz (HD Radio)
- Branding: 97-1 ZHT

Programming
- Format: Contemporary hit radio
- Affiliations: Premiere Networks

Ownership
- Owner: iHeartMedia; (iHM Licenses, LLC)
- Sister stations: KAAZ-FM; KJMY; KNRS; KNRS-FM; KODJ

History
- First air date: February 1, 1961 (as KLUB-FM on 94.9 MHz)
- Former call signs: KLUB-FM (1961–1968); KWIC (1968–1972); KLUB-FM (1972–1978); KISN (1978–1989); KISN-FM (1989–2004)
- Call sign meaning: From former "Hot" format

Technical information
- Licensing authority: FCC
- Facility ID: 63820
- Class: C
- ERP: 20,500 watts
- HAAT: 1,249 meters (4,098 ft)
- Transmitter coordinates: 40°39′35″N 112°12′7.5″W

Links
- Public license information: Public file; LMS
- Webcast: Listen live (via iHeartRadio)
- Website: 971zht.iheart.com

KZHT (97.1 FM) is a contemporary hit radio formatted radio station, broadcasting to the Salt Lake City metropolitan area. It is owned by iHeartMedia as one of six radio stations in the market. The station's studios are located in West Valley City, and its transmitter site is located southwest of the city on Farnsworth Peak in the Oquirrh Mountains.

== Station history ==
The station signed on in 1961, as KLUB-FM, airing a music format partially simulcast with KLUB (570 AM).

In 1978, the station became KISN, with an adult contemporary format.

Throughout the 80's and 90's, "Kissin' 97" aired a format that was between Adult Contemporary and Top 40, or Hot Adult Contemporary.

On November 3, 2000, the station changed to an all-1980s hits format. It retained the "Kissin' 97" name and airstaff. This format focused exclusively on music from the 1980s, featuring a wide array of genres.

In 2001, KISN joined at least four other Clear Channel Communications stations in the U.S. in airing "Martha Quinn's Rewind," a program hosted by former MTV VJ Martha Quinn.

On December 22, 2003, 97.1 became the new home of KZHT and its contemporary hit radio programming. This led to the station beginning to play the most popular and current songs across various genres, including pop, hip-hop, dance, and R&B. KZHT had previously been on 94.9 FM, now owned by Cumulus Media.
