= KCSA-LP =

- San Angelo, Texas; United States
- Broadcast area: San Angelo
- Frequency: 97.1 MHz

Programming
- Format: Oldies/Variety

Ownership
- Owner: Concho Christmas Celebration

History
- First air date: December 6, 2002
- Former frequencies: 95.7 MHz (2003–2015)

Technical information
- Licensing authority: FCC
- Facility ID: 134304
- Class: L1
- ERP: 42 watts
- HAAT: 45.6 meters (150 ft)
- Transmitter coordinates: 31°27′43″N 100°26′3″W

Links
- Public license information: LMS
- Website: http://www.kcsaradio.com/

KCSA-LP (97.1 FM) is a radio station licensed to San Angelo, Texas, United States and serving the San Angelo area. The station is currently owned by Concho Christmas Celebration.
