= 96.3 FM =

FM radio frequency

The following radio stations broadcast on FM frequency 96.3 MHz:

== Argentina ==
- Aire Libre in Rio Grande, Tierra del Fuego
- Cristal in San Andrés de Giles, Buenos Aires
- del interior in Concepción, Tucuman
- del Sol in Merlo, San Luis
- El Cóndor in Ushuaia, Tierra del Fuego
- Glam in Salta, Salta
- Jai in Buenos Aires
- Jardín in Funes, Santa Fe
- Libres in Paso de los Libres, Corrientes
- Nitro in Tandil, Buenos Aires
- Omega in Zárate, Buenos Aires
- Radio Fe in Rosario, Santa Fe
- Radio María in Bragado, Buenos Aires
- Radio María in Frías, Santiago del Estero
- Restauración in Las Toscas, Santa Fe
- Sudeste in Justiniano Posse, Córdoba
- SUPeH in Ensenada, Buenos Aires
- Vida in Venado Tuerto, Santa Fe
- Viñas in General Alvear, Mendoza

== Australia ==
- ABC Riverina in Young, New South Wales
- Coast FM 963 in Gosford, New South Wales
- Triple J in Port Macquarie, New South Wales
- 96three in Geelong, Victoria
- Phoenix 96.3 FM in Bundaberg, Queensland

== Canada (Channel 242) ==
- CBDQ-FM in Labrador City, Newfoundland and Labrador
- CBDT-FM in Deer Lake, Newfoundland and Labrador
- CBRB-FM in Banff, Alberta
- CFMK-FM in Kingston, Ontario
- CFMV-FM in Chandler, Quebec
- CFMZ-FM in Toronto, Ontario
- CFWD-FM in Saskatoon, Saskatchewan
- CIHO-FM in St. Hilarion, Quebec
- CINC-FM in Thompson, Manitoba
- CJGY-FM in Grande Prairie, Alberta
- CJLS-FM-2 in Barrington, Nova Scotia
- CKKO-FM in Kelowna, British Columbia
- CKRA-FM in Edmonton, Alberta
- CKYK-FM-1 in Alma, Quebec
- VF2462 in Snow Lake, Manitoba

== Ireland ==
- Northern Sound in Monaghan

== Malaysia ==
- Minnal FM in Selangor and Western Pahang

== Mexico ==
- XEJB-FM in Tlaquepaque, Jalisco
- XHCR-FM in Morelia, Michoacán
- XHEJE-FM in Dolores Hidalgo, Guanajuato
- XHEMF-FM in Monclova, Coahuila
- XHEOE-FM in Tapachula, Chiapas
- XHPOZ-FM in Poza Rica, Veracruz
- XHSCO-FM in Salina Cruz, Oaxaca
- XHSJS-FM in San José del Cabo, Baja California Sur
- XHTOR-FM in Torreón, Coahuila
- XHUP-FM in Tizimín, Yucatán
- XHVS-FM in Hermosillo, Sonora
- XHZAA-FM in Villa de Zaachila, Oaxaca

== Philippines ==
- DWRK in Manila
- DYRK in Cebu City
- DXFX in Davao City
- DWCW in Legazpi City
- PA in Cagayan De Oro
- DXWR in Zamboanga City

== Singapore ==
- 96.3 Hao FM in Singapore

== Sint Maarten (Dutch Caribbean) ==
- PJD-6 in Philipsburg

== Taiwan ==
- Alian 96.3 (Indigenous Peoples Radio Station) in Taipei, Kaohsiung and Hualien
- i like Radio (BCC Pop Network) in Kinmen

== United Kingdom ==
- Capital North West and Wales on the North Wales Coast
- Greatest Hits Radio West Yorkshire in Leeds
- Heart East in Basildon
- Heart West in Bristol
- Nation Radio Scotland in Renfrewshire

== United States (Channel 242) ==
- KACZ in Riley, Kansas
- KAJK in Susanville, California
- KARC-LP in Oroville, California
- KBAZ in Hamilton, Montana
- KCAH-LP in Carthage, Missouri
- KCOT (FM) in Cotulla, Texas
- KERP in Ingalls, Kansas
- KFMI in Eureka, California
- KGGB in Yorktown, Texas
- KGID in Giddings, Texas
- KHEY in El Paso, Texas
- KHLS in Blytheville, Arkansas
- KICL in Pleasantville, Iowa
- KJFK-FM in Llano, Texas
- KJHV-LP in Killeen, Texas
- KKJC-LP in Mcminnville, Oregon
- KKLZ in Las Vegas, Nevada
- KKOB-FM in Albuquerque, New Mexico
- KKWA in West Linn, Oregon
- KLLL-FM in Lubbock, Texas
- KMWA in Edina, Minnesota
- KNDS-LP in Fargo, North Dakota
- KOKO-LP in Hana, Hawaii
- KOUS-LP in Monroe, Louisiana
- KRCW (FM) in Royal City, Washington
- KRIM-LP in Payson, Arizona
- KRNQ in Keokuk, Iowa
- KRTR in Kailua, Hawaii
- KRWW-LP in Walla Walla, Washington
- KRZN in Billings, Montana
- KSCS in Fort Worth, Texas
- KSSB in Calipatria, California
- KSWG in Wickenburg, Arizona
- KTDR in Del Rio, Texas
- KTTG in Mena, Arkansas
- KUBB in Mariposa, California
- KWEW-LP in Wenatchee, Washington
- KXCM in Twentynine Palms, California
- KXLW in Houston, Alaska
- KXOL in Los Angeles, California
- KLCC in Los Angeles, California
- KXRK in Provo, Utah
- KZCH in Derby, Kansas
- KZDY in Cawker City, Kansas
- KZMX-FM in Hot Springs, South Dakota
- KZXL in Hudson, Texas
- WAJZ in Voorheesville, New York
- WBBM in Chicago, Illinois
- WBPU-LP in St. Petersburg, Florida
- WCJK in Murfreesboro, Tennessee
- WDVD in Detroit, Michigan
- WFUN-FM in Saint Louis, Missouri
- WFYX in Walpole, New Hampshire
- WHUR in Washington, District of Columbia
- WHYS-LP in Eau Claire, Wisconsin
- WILW-LP in Waupaca, Wisconsin
- WIVY in Morehead, Kentucky
- WJAA in Austin, Indiana
- WJBZ in Seymour, Tennessee
- WJIZ in Albany, Georgia
- WJJB in Gray, Maine
- WJOP-LP in Newburyport, Massachusetts
- WJSA in Jersey Shore, Pennsylvania
- WJXI-LP in Jacksonville, Alabama
- WKLA-FM in Ludington, Michigan
- WKSP in Aiken, South Carolina
- WLCN in Atlanta, Illinois
- WLOQ in Oil City, Pennsylvania
- WLVQ in Columbus, Ohio
- WLXT in Petoskey, Michigan
- WLYB in Livingston, Alabama
- WMAD in Sauk City, Wisconsin
- WMCV in Farmersburg, Indiana
- WOHM-LP in Charleston, South Carolina
- WOTR (FM) in Lost Creek, West Virginia
- WPKM-LP in Parkersburg, West Virginia
- WQRG-LP in Diamondhead, Mississippi
- WRHT in Morehead City, North Carolina
- WRNK-LP in Lanett, Alabama
- WROV in Martinsville, Virginia
- WSCQ-LP in Sun City Center, Florida
- WSFQ in Peshtigo, Wisconsin
- WTOC-FM in Clayton, Georgia
- WTSW-LP in Manitowoc, Wisconsin
- WULB-LP in Long Boat Key, Florida
- WURK-LP in Tampa, Florida
- WUSJ in Madison, Mississippi
- WXKE in Churubusco, Indiana
- WXKY in Stanford, Kentucky
- WXNY-FM in New York, New York
- WLCC-FM in New York, New York
- WXSU-LP in Salisbury, Maryland
- WXWX in Marietta, Mississippi
- WYHX in Indianapolis, Indiana
- WYSG-LP in Hinckley, Minnesota

== Vanuatu ==
- Buzz 96.3FM in Port Vila
