= WMYL =

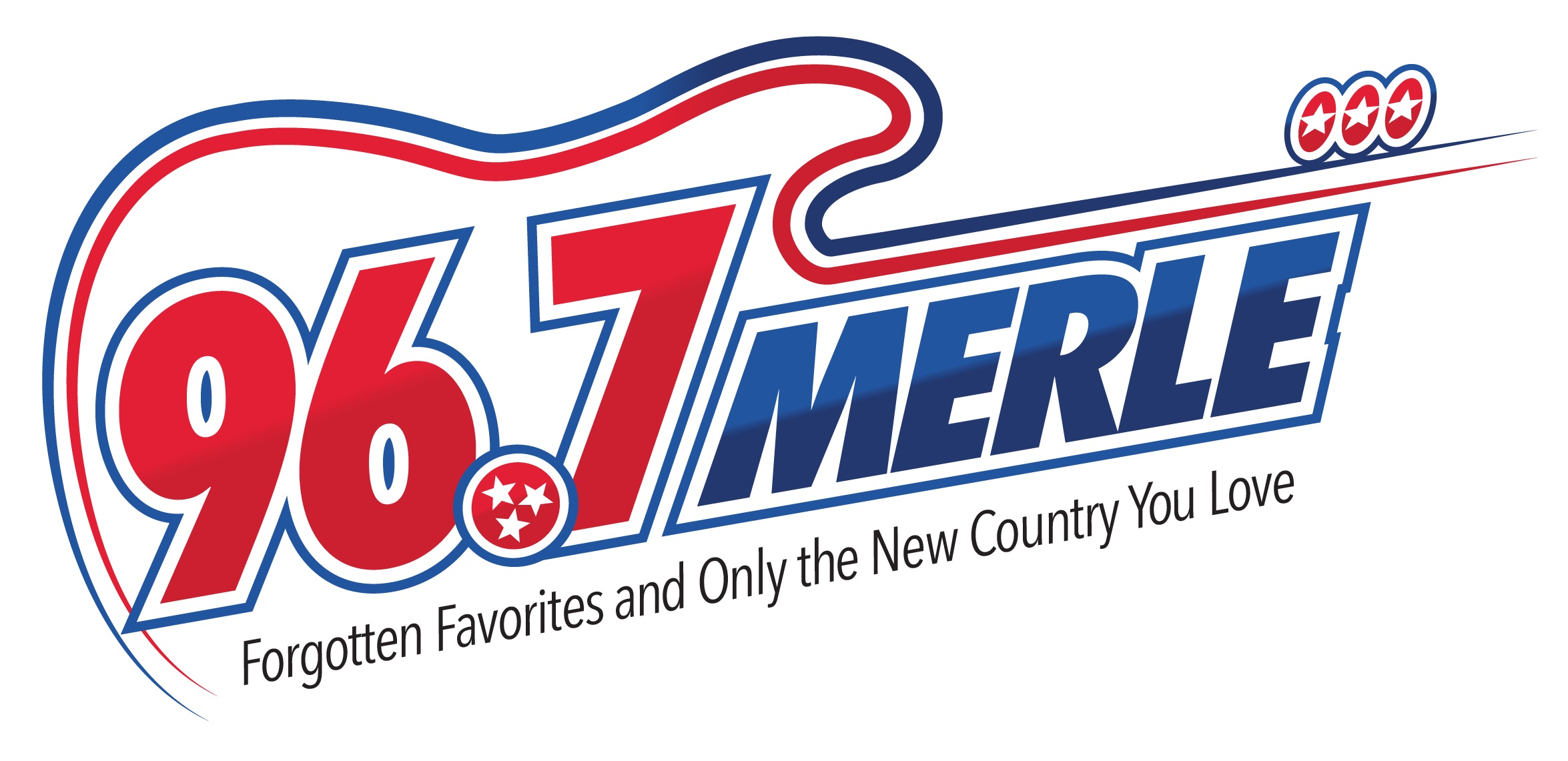
- Halls Crossroads, Tennessee; United States
- Broadcast area: Knoxville
- Frequency: 96.7 MHz
- Branding: 96.7 Merle

Programming
- Format: Country

Ownership
- Owner: M & M Broadcasting Ron Meredith
- Sister stations: WYSH, WJBZ, WQLA

History
- Former call signs: WXJB (1990–2006)

Technical information
- Licensing authority: FCC
- Facility ID: 30610
- Class: A
- ERP: 2,800 watts
- HAAT: 149.0 meters (488.8 ft)
- Transmitter coordinates: 36°4′21.00″N 84°1′18.00″W

Links
- Public license information: Public file; LMS
- Webcast: Listen live
- Website: 967merle.com

WMYL (96.7 FM, "96.7 Merle") is a radio station broadcasting the country music format. Licensed to Halls Crossroads, Tennessee, United States, the station serves the Knoxville area. The station is currently owned and operated by Ron Meredith M & M Broadcasting.

In 2006, Ron Meredith and M&M Broadcasting purchased WXJB, WFXY, and WANO in Middlesboro, KY, Harrogate, TN, and Pineville, KY, for just over 1 million dollars, changed the call letters to of WXJB to WMYL, and branded the station as Merle FM, moving it Knoxville and Halls Crossroads, to which it is licensed. As of spring 2020, the station is now branded "96.7 Merle. Forgotten favorites and only the new country you love."

Since moving on to Halls Crossroads, 96.7 Merle has offered a mix of old and new country and is wildly successful in East Tennessee.

The station is home to multiple CMA Personality Of The Year award winners, including morning show Bud and Broadway, afternoon talent Jack Ryan, and Knoxville country legend Mike Hammond on-air at 96.7 Merle.

Meredith and M&M also Own WJBZ Praise 96.3, WYSH AM 1380, FM 101.1, FM 99.5

WQLA FM 95.9 ROCKS FM 95.9, AM 960
