= KZMX =

KZMX may refer to:

- KZMX (AM), a radio station (580 AM) licensed to serve Hot Springs, South Dakota, United States
- KZMX-FM, a radio station (96.3 FM) licensed to serve Hot Springs, South Dakota
