= Villa de Zaachila =

Villa de Zaachila Zaachila
- Town and municipality
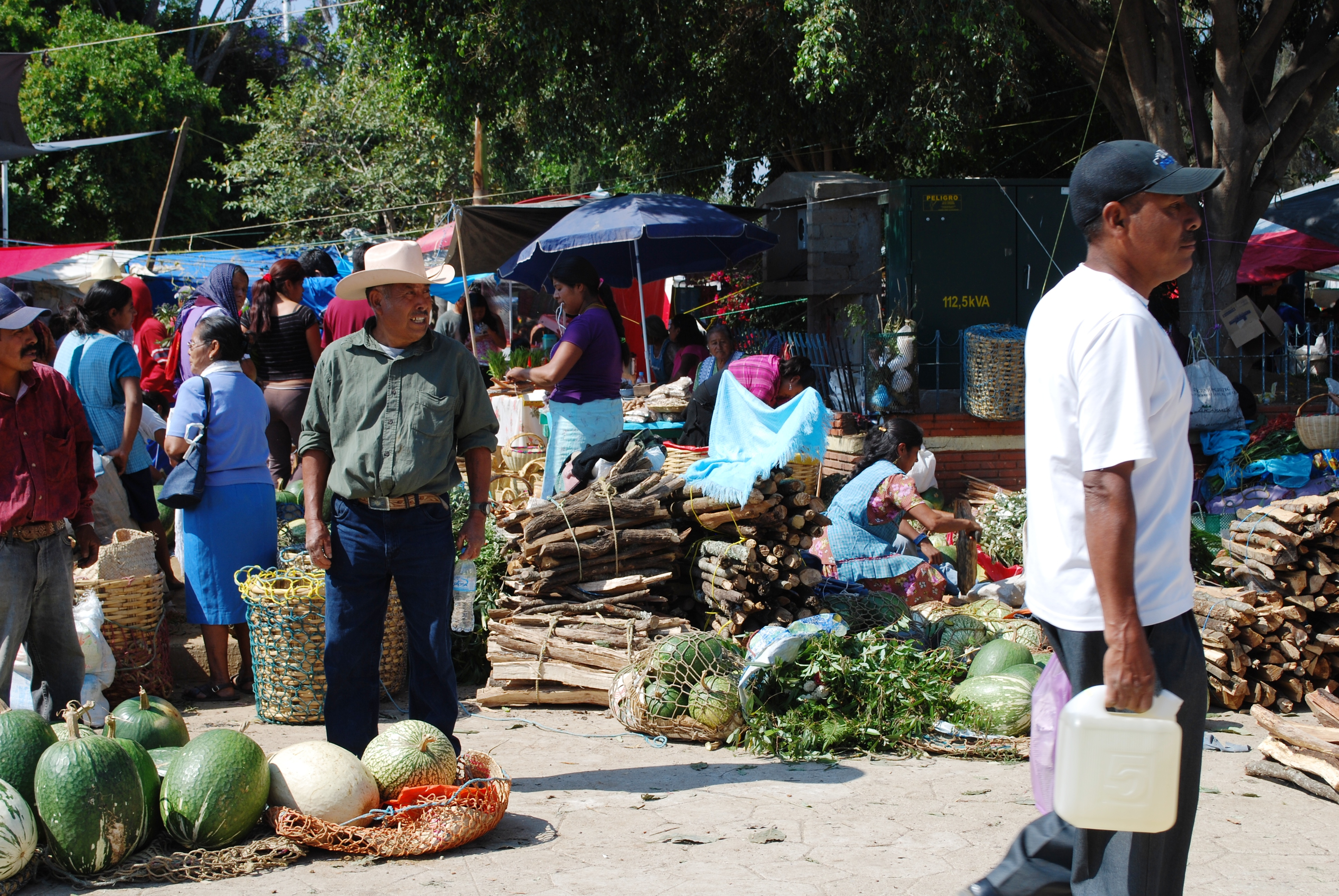
- Scene from the weekly market or tianguis of Villa de Zaachila

- Location within Mexico
- Coordinates: 16°57′03″N 96°44′57″W
- Country: Mexico
- State: Oaxaca

Government
  - Municipal President: Noe Pérez Martínez / Miguel Angel Hernandez Vazquez
- Elevation (of seat): 1,520 m (4,990 ft)

Population (2005) Municipality
  - Municipality: 28,003
  - Seat: 13,721
- Time zone: UTC-6 (Central (US Central))
- Postal code (of seat): 71250

Villa de Zaachila is a town and municipality in Oaxaca, Mexico, 6 km (3.7 mi) from Oaxaca City. It is part of the Zaachila District in the west of the Valles Centrales Region. In the pre-Hispanic era, it was the main city-state for the Valley of Oaxaca after the fall of Monte Albán, and the Zaachila Zapotecs were the prominent political force for much of the Valley of Oaxaca when the Spanish arrived. Since then, it has been mostly quiet, but political unrest has been prominent since 2006 and the municipality has two parallel governments.

Zaachila is famous for its Thursday open air markets, which spreads over much of the center of town and has been a tradition since pre-Hispanic times. It is home to a mostly unexplored archeological site and is known for a dance called the Danza de los Zancudos, or Dance of the Stilts. The official name is Villa de Zaachila (Town of Zaachila). The name Zaachila is from the Zapotec language and means "large leaf of the purslane (Portulaca oleracea)".

== History ==
After the fall of Monte Alban, the Valley of Oaxaca was divided into a number of city-states. They shared a religious center, Mitla, where the deities of the underworld were venerated. Late in the 13th century, the ruler of the Zaachila city-state began to grow in power to dominate much of the surrounding valley. Starting from around 1400, there are five known rulers of the "Zaachila yoo" or "house of Zaachila." These rulers are named Zaachila I, Zaachila II and Zaachila III, Cosijoeza and Coijopij. The names of the first three probably come from the fact that these lords are depicted in codices without names or at least without legible names. The last two were alive during the Spanish Conquest and the last, Coijopij, is depicted in the Lienzo de Guevea in Spanish dress on a Spanish style throne.

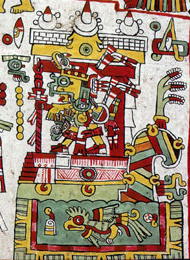
The Mixtec place sign for Zaachila (Ñuhu Tocuisi in Mixtec), from the Codex Zouche-Nuttall

The territory of these Zapotecs was considered vulnerable since the Mixtecs’ eastern border was nearby. Another threat was the Aztecs, who had made incursions trying to control the trade route to the Isthmus.The city of Zaachila became key to defending Zapotec lands. Despite these threats, Zaachila extended its power over a large area, so that the entire valley came to be known by the city’s name. The history of the Zapotecs and Mixtecs is one of war, strategy and alliances. Most alliances between the Zaachila Zapotec and the Mixtec involved the common concern of keeping the Aztecs out of Oaxaca. Zaachila II defeated the Mixes and other peoples on the road to Tehuantepec but was in relative peace with the Mixtecs. Zaachila III fought the Mixtecs and the Aztecs, but lost the capital of Zaachila, moving to Tehuantepec.

The last two rulers of the Zaachila Zapotecs were Cosijoeza and Cosijopii, who were father and son. Aztec pressure forced Cosijoeza to allow trade passage and the establishment of an Aztec military outpost in what is now the city of Oaxaca. Cosijopii allied with the Aztecs and Mixtecs against the Spanish, regaining the lost city of Zaachila, but ultimately was unable to resist the Conquest. Both Cosijoeza and Cosijopii were alive during the Conquest and both were baptized by the Spanish as Don Carlos Cosijoeza and Don Juan Cortez respectively. They continued to control the key town of Tehuantepec after the Conquest.

Since the 2006 Oaxaca protests, Zaachila has had two parallel governments, which have confronted each other numerous times. In June 2006, APPO took over the municipal palace, being one of the first captured by the dissidents during the unrest in Oaxaca state. This act eventually evolved into the creation of a parallel government, a "people’s municipality," headed by Miguel Angel Hernandez Vazquez. This council rejected the government of then municipal president Jose Coronel Martinez and still rejects the "constitutional" government of Noé Pérez Martinez, accusing them of repression, abuse of authority, nepotism and other charges. The town's support is divided between the two governments and each government has control of different aspects of the town. The constitutional government has control of police and other services. The people's government has control of business taxation, which raises about 6,000 pesos per month to provide services such as trash removal. However, the streets are dirty and there is no police presence in the ten neighborhoods of the town. Citizens’ patrols have been organized but nighttime is still dangerous. From its inception, the "people’s government" has received international support from countries such as Venezuela, France, Spain, Germany, Canada and Costa Rica. In 2007 the state legislature recognized the "closure of powers" of the constitutional government but has not recognized the APPO supported government.

There have been a number of confrontations between supporters of the two governments since 2006. The largest occurred in 2008, when there was a confrontation between APPO and supporters of municipal president Noé Pérez Martínez. The governor of Oaxaca, Ulises Ruiz Ortiz was scheduled to appear in the town on a tour but opponents of the visit began to block streets. Supporters of Perez Martinez countered, and the father of the municipal president was accused of firing a shot towards the crowd. However, most confrontation between the two factions has come in the form of graffiti and political posters.

Another legacy of the events of 2006 is Radio Zaachila (XHZAA-FM 96.3). It is one of eight stations that began to illegally operate around that time. It has been supported by the Section 22 of the Sindicato Nacional de Trabajadores de la Educación (Mexico's teachers’ union). In 2008, the homes of Melesio Melchor Angeles and Jorge Aragon Martinez were shot at, with the attack against Melchor Angeles occurring at 2:30 in the morning while he and his family were inside. Both had been accused by municipal authorities of being involved in the altercation that prevented the visit of the governor. Cofetel awarded an operating permit to Zaachila Radio in February 2010 and efforts are underway to get permits for the other stations.

Author Peter Gelderloos considers the current governmental situation to be a partial example of a functioning anarchist society.

== The town ==
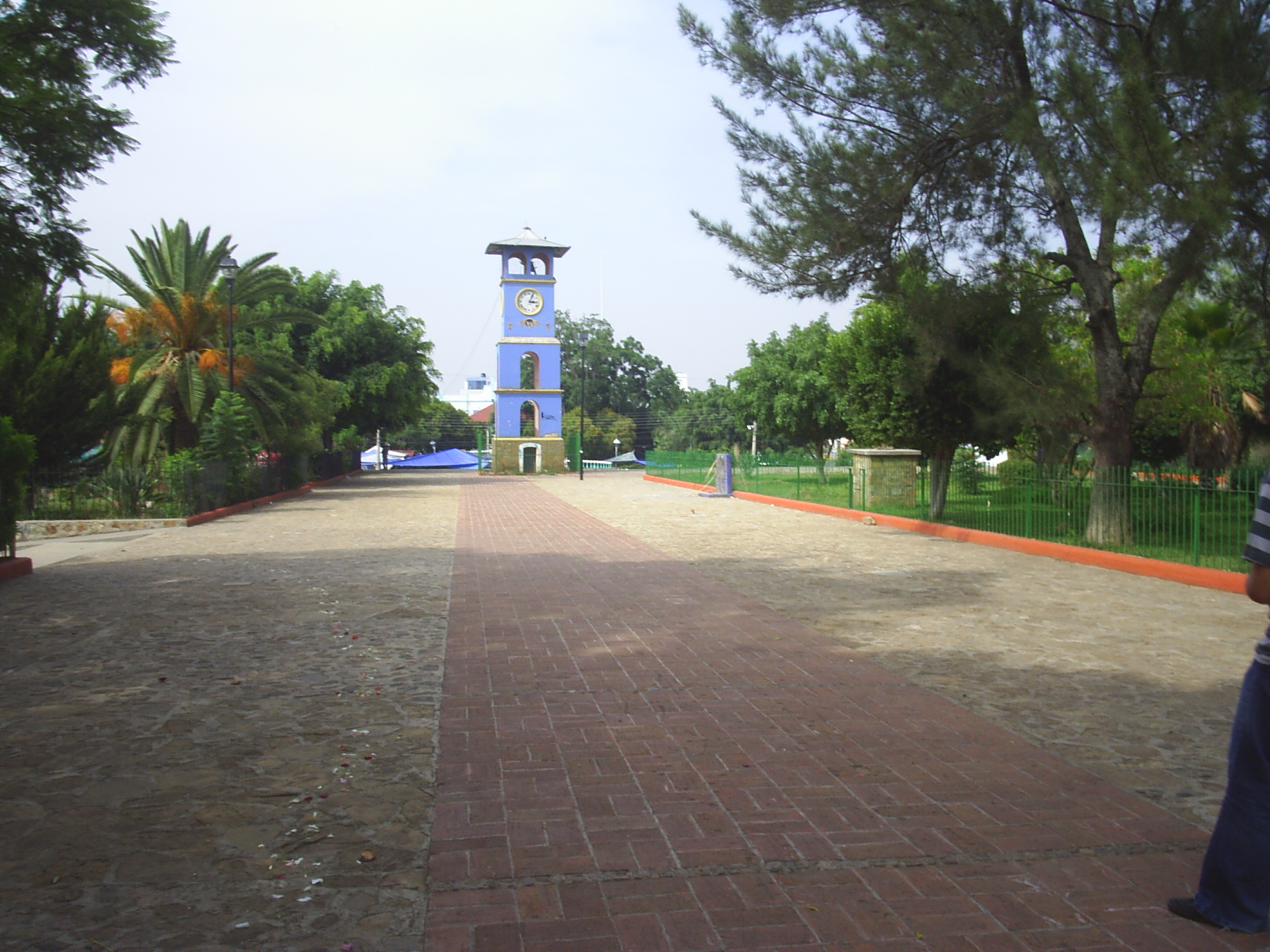
Main plaza with clock

Zaachila has considerable cultural wealth with native music, dance, gastronomy and market days filled with flavors and colors, whose traditions have been preserved for generations. Many houses in this area still have wood stoves and/or a small fireplace in which food is cooked in the embers. Zaachila Zapotec is spoken in the town.

The town is formed by ten neighborhoods called San Pedro, San Pablo, San José, San Sebastián, San Jacinto, Del Carmen, Soledad, La Purísima, La Virgen and Del Niño. Each has its own patron saint and corresponding festival. These festivals are coordinated each year by a formal committee which includes a president, secretary and other positions. Major celebrations celebrated by the whole town include Holy Week with passion plays, processions and other religious events, and Guelaguetza, with a staging of the story of Donaji. At weddings, it is traditional to send a musical band to fetch the bride and accompany her to the church. Writer Gerardo Melchor Calvo has written about the stories and customs of the municipality, based mostly on local oral tradition. The book is called Historia de un pueblo. Relatos y costumbres de Zaachila. Some of the stories include "La Matlacihua", "El Perro Negro", "La Procesión" and "La Marrana." There are also descriptions of local events such as the yearly horse races on 24 July. The center of town has a large plaza with a kiosk, which is surrounded by the municipal palace, archeological site and the church, called "Nuestra Señora de la Natividad" (Our Lady of the Nativity). The church is notable for a number of colonial-era santos, statues of saints, some of them executed in polychrome and still in beautiful condition. Zaachila has a stationary municipal market in which can be found regional foods such as barbacoa, "chichilo,"mole verde, turkey in mole with rice, carnitas and empanadas, served with tepache, atole, mezcal and hot chocolate; however, most shopping is done on Thursday, the town's market day.

Just outside the town is its railroad station, built in the early 20th century when it was the Ferrocarril Agrícola de Oaxaca (Agricultural Railroad of Oaxaca). It is the oldest rail line in the Valley of Oaxaca, which was ceded to the Ferrocarril Mexicano del Sur in 1918.

=== The Día de Plaza ===
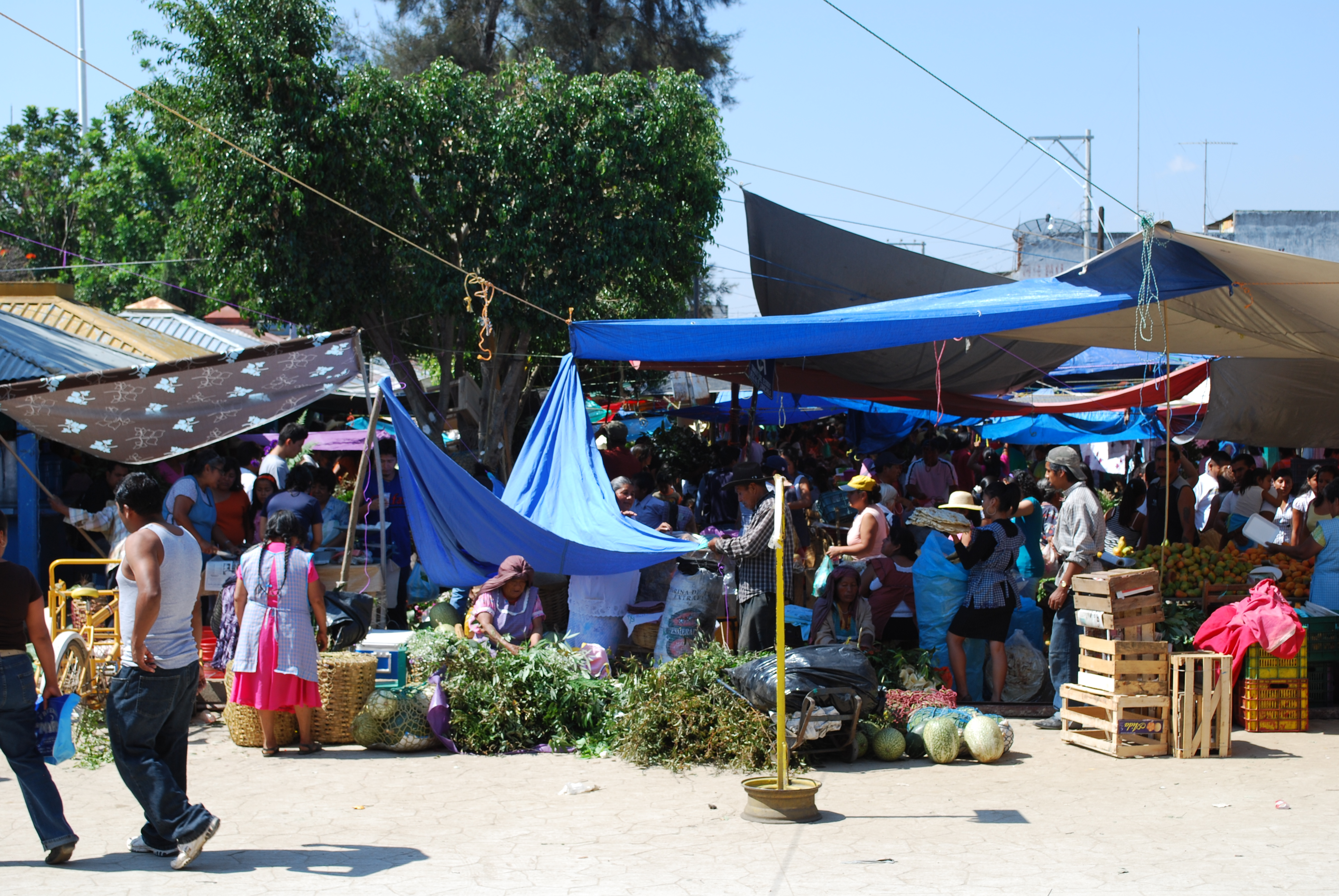
Scene from the Thursday market

The Thursday Día de Plaza (tianguis), or outdoor market, is Zaachila's weekly main event, which attracts people from various parts of the Valley of Oaxaca, many of whom are Zapotec-speaking peoples from the rural areas. The stalls spread for blocks below the archeological site and the main church. This market tradition dates back to pre-Hispanic times and has changed very little since then. This market is divided into three sections. The first is called by the Zapotec name "Logueguindan," which means "plaza of the people of the hills," and is mostly dedicated to firewood and charcoal for use during the week. This market is located at the entrance to the town, and much of this is from the ocote tree which has a distinctive odor. This firewood is obtained from the surrounding hills by native Zapotecs and sold by women, with many of the transactions occurring in the Zapotec language. In addition to firewood, they may offer fruits and vegetables as well. The wood market also sells farming implements such as yokes for oxen. To bring the wood home, there is a service where blue carts pulled by donkeys or horses carry purchases. Although the market has existed for many years, only recently has it been formally organized with an administrator.

The second section is dedicated to the sale of animals such as goats, pigs, sheep, cattle and others. The third section is on the main square proper with a variety of products from the region such as foodstuffs and local prepared foods such as "capirotadas," snacks made with chickpeas, nut cakes, sweet breads, candies such as tamarind balls and more. Other highlights include the scarlet-red pitacaya fruit and a foamy tan drink called "tejate," which is a corn based drink flavored with chocolate, rose petals or ground mamey seeds, sweetened with brown sugar juice and honey. Baskets and pottery are sold for household use.

=== Archeological site ===
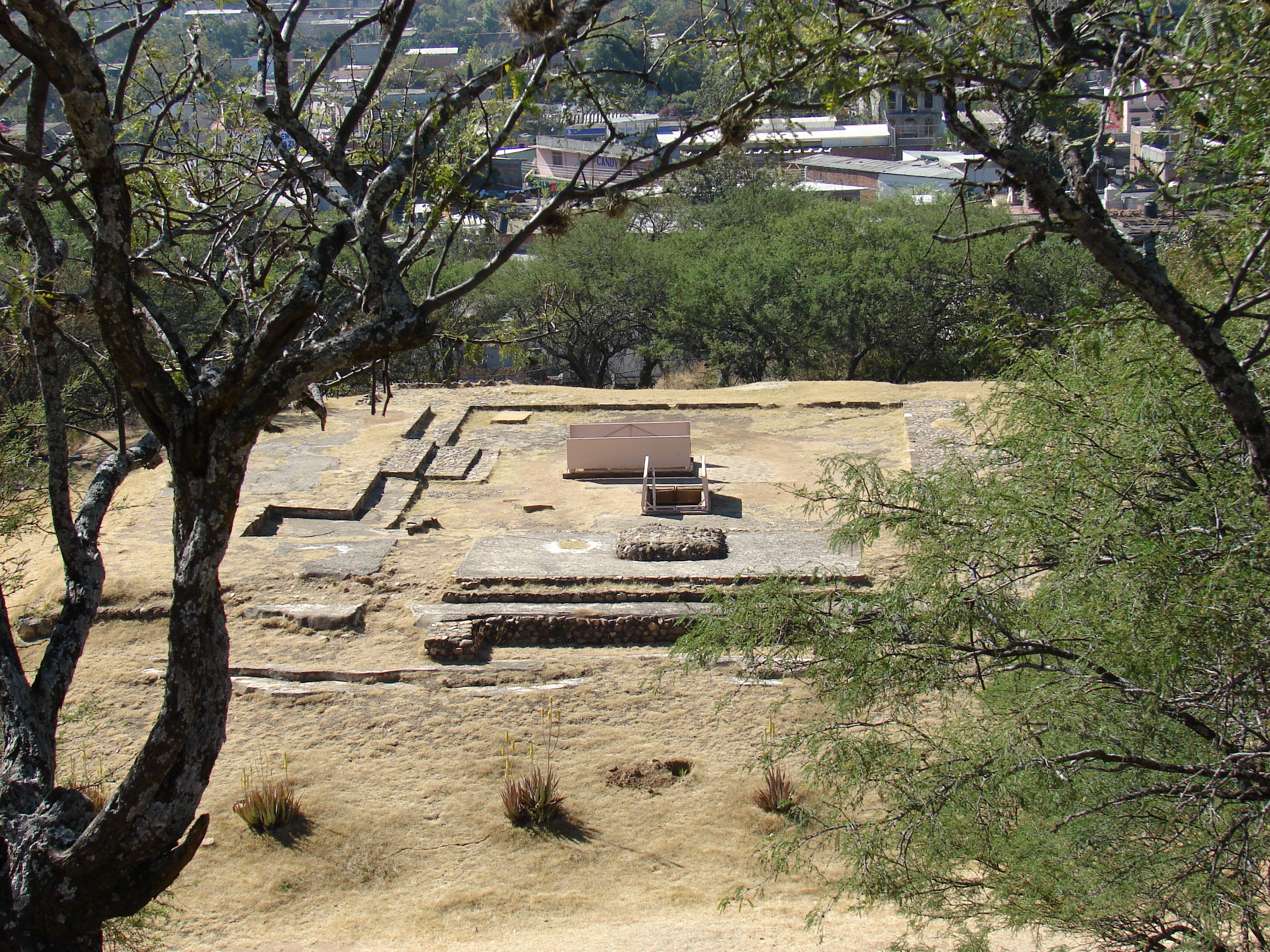
View of the only excavated portion of the site

The archeological site of Zaachila is next to the Church of Nuestra Señora de la Natividad, the remains of the pre-Hispanic center of Zaachila, which was the local capital when the Spanish arrived. At that time, it was considered to be a second Tenochtitlan, as it sat on an island in the middle of a lake, which was called Roaló. The site consists of mounds that define a ceremonial plaza. The extension of the site is not fully known because many of the mounds, plazas and other constructions are currently covered by modern structures, which have destroyed or modified mounds and other artifacts. There is also a large unexplored pyramid. Although largely un-excavated, two tombs were discovered at the site in 1962. These tombs are thought to belong to important Mixtec persons, as they contained a number of interesting grave goods. The first of these tombs has an entrance decorated with feline heads and inside were found seven figures molded from stucco, six placed in pairs on the side walls of the main chamber. In the antechamber, there are depictions of owls and people along with the date of Five Flower. The objects found in these tombs are now on display at the National Museum of Anthropology in Mexico City.

=== Dance of the Zancudos ===
The Dance of the Zancudos originated in the San Pedro neighborhood over 100 years ago and is one of the few places the dance can still be found. The origin of the Dance of the Zancudos is in a promise the inhabitants of Zaachila made to Saint Peter. The story behind it states that an old man encountered an apparition of Saint Peter who asked the community build a church in his name. The apparition appeared each day until it was captured by the local people and enclosed in a small church. Guards were posted at the entrance with rifles and machetes. However, the next day, it was discovered that the saint was no longer there, and he appeared again to the old man who had originally seen him, and indicated that God had sent him to protect the village. Eight days remained until the feast of Saint Peter, and the saint asked that the villagers form pairs on stilts to dance. On the feast day, the men danced on stilts while the women surrounded them with candles and incense. The dancers arrived at the foot of a hill where an image of the saint was found, which was brought to the San Pedro neighborhood where a church was constructed for it.

José Mendoza is the captain of the Zancudo group of the San Pedro neighborhood, and has spent about forty years recruiting dancers and training them. This includes teaching how to make the stilts made from ocote wood. These stilts measure two meters long and have a "foot" fastened by wire and rope. Recruited dancers are boys from 12 to 14 years of age and are trained for two months after they make a pledge to Saint Peter. At first, the boys balance themselves with safety ropes on their stilts. Only men are permitted to dance, with some wearing women's masks. Performances can extend for hours, during which small gifts are distributed among the spectators from baskets. The dancers are accompanied by musical groups, "chinas Oaxaqueñas" and "monos de calenda." These dancers perform the strenuous performance on the feast day of Saint Peter as well as at the Guelaguetza of Oaxaca and other dance festivals in Mexico.

== The municipality ==
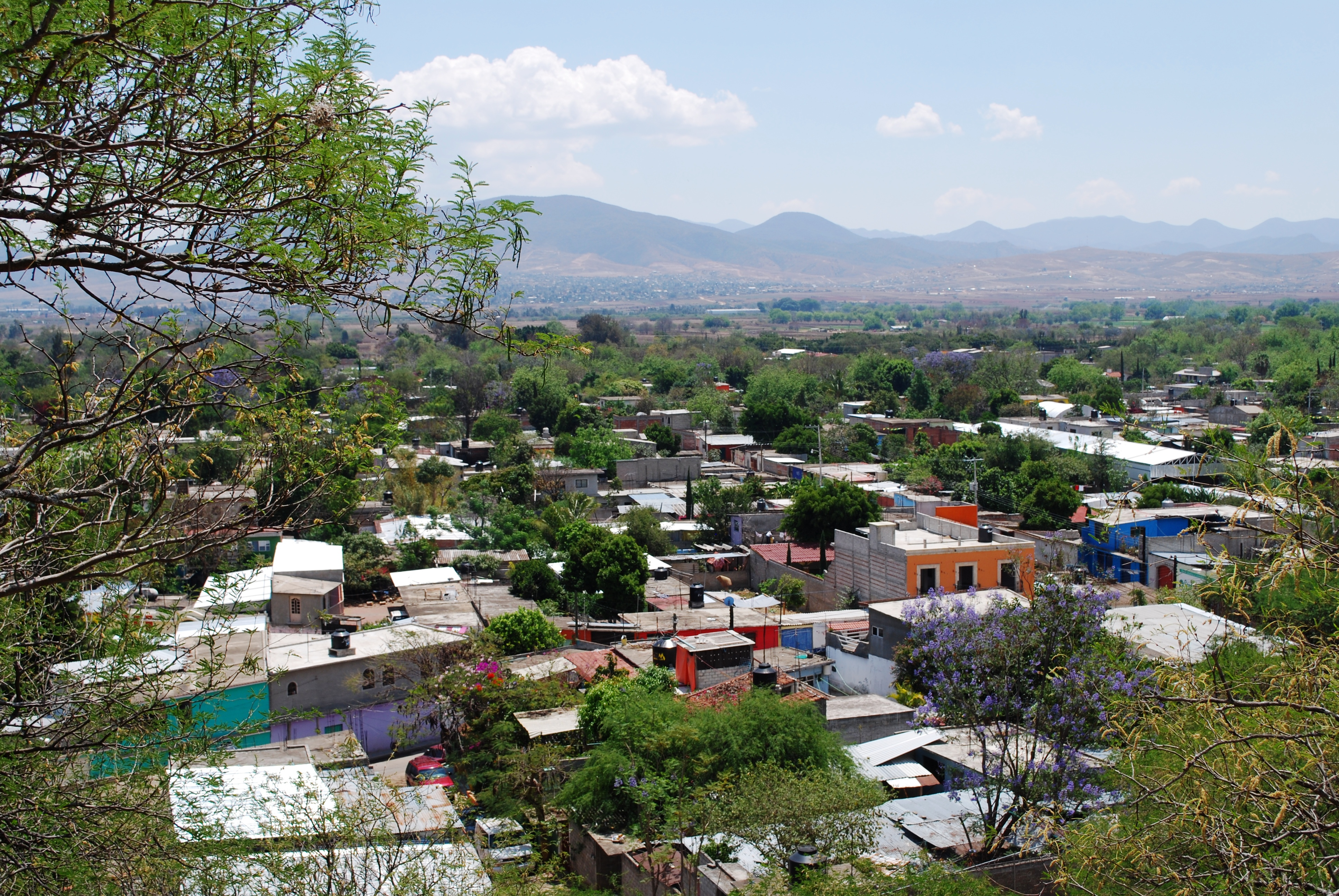
Overlooking the area ESE of the Zaachila archeological site

As municipal seat, the town of Villa de Zaachila is the local governing authority for 25 other named communities, covering an area of 54.86 km^{2}. Just under half of the municipal population of 28,003 lives in the town proper, and about 2,317 people speak an indigenous language. The municipality borders the municipalities of San Raymundo Jalpan, San Pedro la Reforma, Hacienda de Tlanichico y Noriega, Trinidad Zaachila, San Pablo la Raya and Manteón.

The municipal seat is surrounded by low mountains, ten of which are the most prominent. The two main rivers are the Verde and the Atoya. It has a temperate climate with most rain falling in June and July. Wild flora that can be found here includes pines, oaks, willows and other trees, as well as medicinal plants. Wildlife includes deer, foxes, coyotes, opossums, rabbits as well as a wide variety of birds and reptiles.

Much of the economy of the municipality is based on small-scale farming and livestock raising as well as commerce. Agriculture occupies the majority of the land but only 15% of the people. Crops grown here include fruit trees such as apples, peaches, pears, tejocotes, oranges and limes, grains such as corn and various vegetables such as beans and nopals. Most of the crops are irrigated with groundwater which is found close to the surface. Mining and industries employ 27% while commerce, tourism and services employs about 55%.

The municipality has had problems with the illegal trafficking of land, the victims of which are having problems obtaining basic services. One area particularly affected is a zone called Zaachila Segundo. Here about 700 lots, with a value of 50,000 pesos each, are in question. The problem extends from the current rapid growth of the town, whose population is expected to grow by 240% by 2030. About 18,000 inhabitants of the municipality do not have sufficient water, electricity or drainage services.

A more serious problem for the municipality is the open dump that was established about thirty years ago to receive waste from the city of Oaxaca and 18 other municipalities. The dump contains about 650 tons of trash and has space for more, but it is located in a geologically vulnerable zone, and since its establishment, many neighborhoods have been built near it. This means that a number of communities are having health problems due to contaminated ground water and airborne bacteria.

This is the only dump for the entire Oaxaca city area. It began illegally but was legalized in 1986. However, by this time, there had already been a number of complaints from the neighborhoods of Vicente Guerrero and Emiliano Zapata near the site. The problems with the dump were bad enough that even those who made money from sorting through the garbage asked for its closure. The need to build the landfill was announced in 2000. However, the dump still continues to operate the way it always has, with no processing of the waste and minimal efforts in containing pollution.
