= WSCQ =

WSCQ may refer to:

- WSCQ-LP, a low-power FM radio station (96.3 FM) licensed to serve Sun City Center, Florida, United States
- WXBT, a radio station (100.1 FM) licensed to serve West Columbia, South Carolina, United States, which held the call sign WSCQ from 1975 to 2003
