= KAWK (South Dakota) =

Radio station in Custer, South Dakota (1996–2017)

- Custer, South Dakota; United States
- Broadcast area: Rapid City area
- Frequency: 105.1 MHz

Ownership
- Owner: Mt. Rushmore Broadcasting, Inc.
- Sister stations: KFCR, KZMX

History
- First air date: November 1996
- Last air date: May 12, 2017 (date of license cancellation)
- Former call signs: KACP (1993–1996, CP)

Technical information
- Licensing authority: FCC
- Facility ID: 43916
- Class: C1
- ERP: 7,000 watts
- HAAT: 400 meters (1,300 ft)
- Transmitter coordinates: 43°44′41″N 103°28′52″W

Links
- Public license information: Public file; LMS

KAWK (105.1 FM) was a radio station licensed to Custer, South Dakota, United States, and served the Rapid City area. The station was last owned by Mt. Rushmore Broadcasting, Inc.

== History ==
The station was assigned the calls KACP on May 28, 1993. On September 16, 1996, the station changed its call sign to KAWK. The station signed on in November 1996 and was licensed on December 18, 1997.

As of April 2012, the station was silent, but retained an active license under Special Temporary Authority by the Federal Communications Commission (FCC). The station, along with others owned by Mt. Rushmore Broadcasting, filed for an extension of the special temporary authority in early 2015, due to staffing issues. It was reported that staff had unexpectedly resigned, and there was difficulty finding new employees.

In a letter dated May 12, 2017, the FCC ruled that the license of KAWK expired "on or about" October 22, 2009, under Section 312(g) of the Communications Act of 1934. The station's license was cancelled, the call letters were deleted and all authority to operate was terminated.

KAWK filed a Petition for Reconsideration on June 12, 2017.

In another letter dated February 23, 2018, the petition for reconsideration was denied, effectively cancelling the station's license. The reasons stated in the letter indicate the station had been off air for more than 12 months during the licensed term. The FCC noted that when the station resumed broadcasting on August 16, 2009, the station was incorrectly using a previous transmitting location (special temporary authority), not the station's licensed site. The FCC also noted that the station's own actions, finances and business judgements were the reason for its cancellation.
