= WILW =

WILW may refer to:

- WILW-LP, a low-power radio station (96.3 FM) licensed to serve Waupaca, Wisconsin, United States
- WIBG-FM, a New Jersey radio station that formerly had the callsign WILW
- Wil Wheaton (born 1972), an American actor prolific on Twitter with the username @wilw
