= KCAH =

KCAH may refer to:

- KCAH-LP, a low-power radio station (107.9 FM) licensed to Carthage, Missouri, United States
- KQET, a television station (channel 25 analog/58 digital) licensed to Watsonville, California, United States, which held the call sign KCAH from January 1986 to August 2007
