= KAWK =

KAWK may refer to:

- KAWK (FM), a radio station (88.3 FM) licensed to serve Coalinga, California, United States
- KAWK (South Dakota), a defunct radio station (105.1 FM) formerly licensed to serve Custer, South Dakota, United States
