= KARC =

KARC may refer to:

- KARC-LP, a low-power radio station (96.3 FM) licensed to serve Oroville, California, United States
- KMVS (FM), a radio station (89.3 FM) licensed to serve Moss Beach, California, which held the call sign KARC from 2010 to 2015
