= KCOT =

KCOT may refer to:

- KCOT (FM), a radio station (96.3 FM) licensed to serve Cotulla, Texas], United States
- Cotulla-La Salle County Airport (ICAO code KCOT)
- Keratocystic odontogenic tumour
