= WJBZ-FM =

- Seymour, Tennessee; United States
- Broadcast area: Knoxville, Tennessee
- Frequency: 96.3 MHz
- Branding: Praise 96.3

Programming
- Format: Southern Gospel

Ownership
- Owner: M & M Broadcasting
- Sister stations: WMYL, WYSH, WQLA

History
- First air date: March 31, 1991
- Former call signs: WJBZ (1990–1998)
- Call sign meaning: founder J. B a z ell Mull

Technical information
- Licensing authority: FCC
- Facility ID: 59808
- Class: A
- ERP: 2,900 watts
- HAAT: 146 meters (479 feet)
- Transmitter coordinates: 35°56′17″N 83°42′11″W

Links
- Public license information: Public file; LMS
- Website: praise963.com

WJBZ-FM (96.3 FM, "Praise 96.3") is a radio station licensed to serve Seymour, Tennessee. The station is owned by M & M Broadcasting, Ron Meredith. It airs a Southern Gospel music format.

WJBZ-FM was started by the late J. Bazzel Mull, a longtime preacher and the founder of the Mull Singing Convention program.

The station was assigned the WJBZ-FM call letters by the Federal Communications Commission on August 28, 1990. In 2015 Ron Meredith and M & M broadcasting bought the station. WJBZ’s format is Southern Gospel and was in jeopardy of changing formats. M & M Broadcasting’s Ron Meredith and Jack Ryan (Eric Hammond) decided to dedicate one year to try to revive the station and the format. In March or 2015 the station celebrated its 25th anniversary with an overwhelming community display during a station open house. That year the station was named Southern Gospel radio station of the year in the United States. The station repeated the accomplishment in 2016,2017,2018,2019,2020. A feat never before accomplished by another radio station.
