= WQJM =

WQJM may refer to:

- WQJM (AM), a radio station (1230 AM) licensed to serve Pineville, Kentucky, United States
- WWHK (AM), a radio station (1450 AM) licensed to serve Myrtle Beach, South Carolina, United States, which held the call sign WQJM from 2002 to 2007
