= Santa Inés del Monte =

- Municipality and town
- Location in Mexico
- Coordinates: 16°56′N 96°51′W
- Country: Mexico
- State: Oaxaca

Area
  - Total: 49.57 km^{2} (19.14 sq mi)
- Time zone: UTC-6 (Central Standard Time)

Santa Inés del Monte is a town and municipality in Oaxaca in south-western Mexico. The municipality covers an area of km^{2}. It is part of the Zaachila District in the west of the Valles Centrales Region.

As of 2005, the municipality had a total population of .
