= XHUP-FM =

Tizimín, Yucatán; Mexico
- Frequency: 96.3 FM
- Branding: Candela

Programming
- Format: Grupera

Ownership
- Owner: Cadena RASA; (La Voz del Caribe, S.A. de C.V.)

History
- First air date: January 18, 1962 (concession)
- Former call signs: XEUP-AM
- Former frequencies: 1420 kHz (1962–1980); 1310 kHz (1980–2000); 790 kHz (2000–2010)

Technical information
- ERP: 6 kW
- Transmitter coordinates: 21°08′06″N 88°07′08.32″W

Links
- Website: cadenarasa.com

XHUP-FM is a radio station on 96.3 FM in Tizimín, Yucatán, Mexico. It is owned by Cadena RASA and known as Candela with a grupera format.

== History ==
XEUP-AM 1420, a 250-watt station, received its concession on January 18, 1962. It promptly raised its power to 500 watts daytime. The 1980s saw XEUP move to 1310 with 1,000 watts daytime, and XEUP finished its AM years on 790 kHz with 2.5 kW day and 1 kW night.

XEUP moved to FM in 2010.
