= Santa María Coyotepec =

- Municipality and town
- Location in Mexico Santa María Coyotepec (Mexico)
- Coordinates: 16°59′N 96°42′W
- Country: Mexico
- State: Oaxaca
- Time zone: UTC-6 (Central Standard Time)

Santa María Coyotepec is a town and municipality in Oaxaca in southern Mexico. The municipality covers an area of km^{2}. It is part of the Centro District in the Valles Centrales region. As of 2005, the municipality had a total population of 2,070.

Zaachila Zapotec is spoken in the town.
