= San Antonio Huitepec =

- Municipality and town
- Location in Mexico
- Coordinates: 16°56′N 97°09′W
- Country: Mexico
- State: Oaxaca

Area
  - Total: 199.04 km^{2} (76.85 sq mi)
- Elevation: 2,340 m (7,680 ft)

Population (2005)
  - Total: 4,303
- Time zone: UTC-6 (Central Standard Time)

San Antonio Huitepec is a town and municipality in Oaxaca in southeastern Mexico and is the fastest shrinking municipality in Oaxaca in terms of population, with a population change of -31.5% going from the 2010 consensus to the 2020 consensus. The municipality covers an area of 199.04 km^{2}. It is part of the Zaachila District in the west of the Valles Centrales Region.

As of 2005, the municipality had a total population of 4,303.
