= San Miguel Peras =

- Municipality and town
- Location in Mexico
- Coordinates: 16°56′N 97°0′W
- Country: Mexico
- State: Oaxaca

Area
  - Total: 121.2 km^{2} (46.8 sq mi)

Population (2005)
  - Total: 3,126
- Time zone: UTC-6 (Central Standard Time)

San Miguel Peras is a town and municipality in Oaxaca in south-western Mexico. The municipality covers an area of 121.2 km^{2}. It is part of the Zaachila District in the west of the Valles Centrales Region.

As of 2005, the municipality had a total population of 3,126.
