= XHPOZ-FM =

Radio station in Poza Rica, Veracruz

- Poza Rica, Veracruz; Mexico
- Frequency: 96.3 FM
- Branding: La Estación

Ownership
- Owner: Instituto de Estudios Superiores de Poza Rica; (Corporación Enigma, A.C.)

History
- First air date: May 2019
- Call sign meaning: POZa Rica

Technical information
- Licensing authority: CRT
- Class: A
- ERP: 3 kW
- HAAT: -46.20 m
- Transmitter coordinates: 20°32′06″N 97°28′21″W

Links
- Website: iespr.edu.mx/radio_iespr.php

XHPOZ-FM is a radio station on 96.3 FM in Poza Rica, Veracruz, Mexico. It is owned by the Instituto de Estudios Superiores de Poza Rica and known as La Estación.

== History ==
The Corporación Enigma application for a new radio station in Poza Rica was filed on December 16, 2003. It languished for nearly 15 years until the Federal Telecommunications Institute dismissed the mutually exclusive permit application of Luis Arturo Rivera Garza, filed in 2013, and awarded XHPOZ-FM to Enigma.

XHPOZ began testing in late May 2019.
