= WXWX =

- Marietta, Mississippi; United States
- Broadcast area: Booneville, Mississippi; Fulton, Mississippi; Tupelo, Mississippi
- Frequency: 96.3 MHz
- Branding: Wild 96.3

Programming
- Format: Top 40 (CHR)

Ownership
- Owner: Mike Brandt; (Southern Broadcasting LLC)

History
- First air date: 2008

Technical information
- Licensing authority: FCC
- Facility ID: 171032
- Class: A
- ERP: 3,900 watts
- HAAT: 125 meters (410 ft)
- Transmitter coordinates: 34°24′33.4″N 88°32′24.2″W

Links
- Public license information: Public file; LMS

WXWX (96.3 FM) is a radio station licensed to the town of Marietta, Mississippi and owned by Mike Brandt, through licensee Southern Broadcasting LLC. It features a Top 40 (CHR) format known as Wild 96.3. The previous programming was a simulcast arrangement with country-formatted WADI, but the two stations have different owners and have coverage areas which overlap.

== History ==
WXWX began broadcasting in 2008, and aired a sports format, as an affiliate of ESPN Radio. In summer 2016, the station dropped its sports format. It later adopted an alternative rock format, simulcasting "I96" WIVG in Tunica, Mississippi.

As of November 25, 2022, the station flipped to Top 40/CHR as "Wild 96.3".
