= XHEJE-FM =

Radio station in Dolores Hidalgo, Guanajuato, Mexico

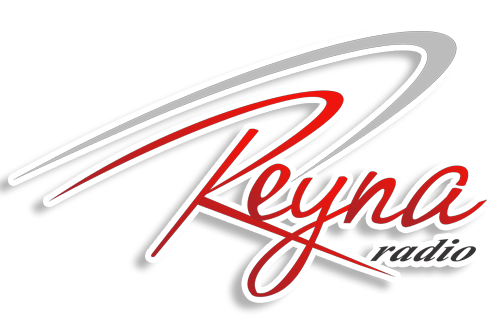
- Dolores Hidalgo, Guanajuato; Mexico
- Frequency: 96.3 MHz
- Branding: Radio Reyna

Programming
- Format: Regional Mexican

Ownership
- Owner: Reyna López Hermanos, S.A. de C.V.

History
- First air date: June 18, 1964 (concession)

Technical information
- ERP: 3 kW
- Transmitter coordinates: 21°10′11″N 100°53′22″W

Links
- Webcast: Live Stream

XHEJE-FM is a radio station on 96.3 FM in Dolores Hidalgo, Guanajuato. It is owned by Reyna López Hermanos, S.A. de C.V., and carries a Regional Mexican format known as Radio Reyna.

== History ==
XHEJE began as XEJE-AM 1370, with a concession awarded on June 18, 1964. It was a 500-watt daytimer owned by Luis Ríos Castañeda. In 1983, the Reyna López brothers got involved for the first time with the transfer of the station's concession to their cousin, Alejandro Reyna García. Ten years later, it was transferred to María Guadalupe López Montellano, the Reyna López brothers' mother, and finally to a company owned by both families in 2000.

It was approved to migrate to FM in 2011 as XHEJE-FM on 96.3.
