= Zaachila Zapotec =

Language

- Native to: Mexico
- Region: south Oaxaca
- Ethnicity: 10,000 (1990 census)
- Native speakers: (550 cited 1990 census)
- Language family: Oto-Manguean: Zapotecan; Zapotec; Central; Valley; Extended Ocotepec; Zaachila Zapotec

Language codes
- ISO 639-3: ztx
- Glottolog: zaac1239
- ELP: Zaachila Zapotec

Zaachila Zapotec (San Raymundo Jalpan Zapotec) is a small Zapotec language of Oaxaca, Mexico. It is perhaps a dialect of Yatzeche Zapotec, which is 85% intelligible to Zaachila speakers. Tilquiapan Zapotec is 75% intelligible, 72% of San Juan Guelavía to Zaachila speakers.

Zaachila Zapotec is spoken in San Raymundo Jalpan, south Oaxaca City, past Xoxo, Zaachila, San Bartolo Coyotepec, San Pablo Cuatro Venados, and Santa María Coyotepec. It is not written.
