= XHTOR-FM =

Radio station in Torreón, Coahuila

- Torreón, Coahuila; Mexico
- Broadcast area: Comarca Lagunera
- Frequency: 96.3 FM
- Branding: Radio Torreón

Programming
- Format: Public radio

Ownership
- Owner: Municipality of Torreón; (XHTOR Radio Torreón)

History
- First air date: April 30, 1991
- Call sign meaning: TORreón

Technical information
- Licensing authority: CRT
- Class: A
- ERP: 2.8 kW
- HAAT: −18.1 m (−59 ft)

Links
- Webcast: XHTOR

XHTOR-FM is a public radio station on 96.3 FM in Torreón, Coahuila. The station is owned by the municipality of Torreón and known as Radio Torreón.

== History ==
XHTOR began operations on April 30, 1991. It was among the first noncommercial stations in the Comarca Lagunera.
