= XHSJS-FM =

Radio station in San José del Cabo, Baja California Sur

- San José del Cabo, Baja California Sur; Mexico
- Frequency: 96.3 FM
- Branding: Cabo Mil

Programming
- Format: Full-service radio

Ownership
- Owner: Cabo Mil, S.A. de C.V.

History
- First air date: November 18, 1988
- Call sign meaning: San José del Cabo

Technical information
- Licensing authority: CRT
- Class: B1
- ERP: 14.44 kW
- HAAT: 145.4 m (477 ft)
- Transmitter coordinates: 23°01′46″N 109°43′43″W
- Repeaters: XHCCAA-FM 93.9 Todos Santos (3 kW ERP, 97.4 m HAAT)

Links
- Webcast: Listen live
- Website: cabomil.net

XHSJS-FM is a radio station on 96.3 FM in San José del Cabo, Baja California Sur, Mexico. The station is known as Cabo Mil.

== History ==
XHSJS went on the air November 18, 1988, though it received its concession on August 21, 1989. It was owned by Luis Farías Mackey, but the driving force behind the foundation of Cabo Mil was Guillermo Salas Peyró, who not only had developed several resorts in the region but had also founded Núcleo Radio Mil decades earlier—thus the name of the station. It was the first station in far southern Baja California Sur; the second station, XESJC-AM 660, did not get its concession until 1995.

Cabo Mil lost its transmitter tower on four separate occasions, in 1995, 1997, 2001 and 2014, requiring a relocation to a new tower site.
