= XHZAA-FM =

Community radio station in Villa de Zaachila, Oaxaca

Villa de Zaachila, Oaxaca; Mexico
- Frequency: 96.3 MHz
- Branding: Zaachila Radio 96.3

Ownership
- Owner: Cultura y Comunicación de Zaachila, A.C.

History
- First air date: 2010 (with permit)
- Call sign meaning: Zaachila

Technical information
- Class: D
- ERP: .02 kW
- HAAT: -123 m
- Transmitter coordinates: 16°56′57.37″N 96°45′00.47″W

Links
- Website: zaachilaradio.org

XHZAA-FM is a community radio station on 96.3 FM in Villa de Zaachila, Oaxaca. XHZAA is owned by Cultura y Comunicación de Zaachila, A.C. and is known as Zaachila Radio.

== History ==
Zaachila Radio has its roots in the 2006 Oaxaca protests, as one of eight pirate radio stations that began to operate around that time. It was supported by Section 22 of the SNTE teachers' union and originally operated on 94.1 MHz.

On February 19, 2010, Zaachila Radio received a formal permit, this time on 96.3 with the calls ign XHZAA-FM. It was among a wave of six community radio stations awarded permits by Cofetel.
