= J. Bazzel Mull =

- Birth name: Jacob Bazzel Mull
- Born: October 4, 1914; Burke County, North Carolina, U.S.
- Died: September 5, 2006 (aged 91)
- Genres: Christian
- Occupations: minister religious broadcaster
- Years active: 1942 – 2006

Jacob Bazzel Mull (October 4, 1914 in Valdese, North Carolina – September 5, 2006) was a Christian minister and religious broadcaster in East Tennessee.

== Biography ==
Mull was the grandson of Wallace B. Mull, a circuit riding preacher in the 1800s. His parents and siblings had formed a Gospel music group, The Valdese Sacred Band, and Mull played banjo in the group as a child.

He had been legally blind since the age of 11 months, after an accidental fall into a fireplace had damaged his eyesight. He memorized verses from the Bible as someone read them aloud.

Mull began preaching in 1932. In 1939, Mull began preaching on radio stations in North Carolina. In 1942 he began a Gospel music program on two AM radio stations in Knoxville, Tennessee, WROL and WNOX. He later bought an FM station in Knoxville, WJBZ, which he nicknamed Praise 96.3. Mull syndicated the program on nighttime clear-channel megastation WWL 870 AM in New Orleans and consequently became known among nighttime truck drivers across the United States. Commonly he was master-of-ceremonies with his wife Elizabeth and used the familiar by-line "This is your old neighbour J. Bazzel [then her voice] and Mrs. Mull [back to his voice] with your Mull—M-U-L-L—Singing Convention." Recordings by The Chuck Wagon Gang were frequent. The Mulls also broadcast recordings by Jimmie Davis, whom they habitually introduced as "twice Governor of the great State of Louisiana." Mull would solicit orders for the recordings, emphasizing that they were "pressed by Columbia" and that his address was in Knoxville, Tennessee, lest it be confused with the larger Nashville, which in the public mind was probably more identified with the musical style.

Mull branched into television in the 1950s. He hosted an hour-long Gospel music program, The Mull Singing Convention, on Knoxville television, first on WBIR-TV and later on WVLT-TV. Mull's Gospel music program was also broadcast in Chattanooga, Tennessee, originally on WRGP-TV when that station went on the air in 1956. Mull's show moved to WTVC when it began broadcasting in 1959. He also used the Mull Singing Convention name on shape note hymnals, still published today.

Mull was a staunch Democrat even though he hailed from Republican East Tennessee. As a minister and a Democrat he was known for his humorous comment that the Lord rode a donkey, not an elephant, into Jerusalem. On 26 September 2006 Mull was eulogized on the floor of the U.S. House of Representatives by John J. "Jimmy" Duncan Jr., who said that Mull's most famous line was "Ain't that right, Mrs. Mull?"

Mull was inducted into the Southern Gospel Hall of Fame in 2003.
