= San Pablo Cuatro Venados =

- Municipality and town
- Location in Mexico
- Coordinates: 17°0′N 96°54′W
- Country: Mexico
- State: Oaxaca

Area
  - Total: 59.96 km^{2} (23.15 sq mi)
- Elevation: 2,359 m (7,740 ft)

Population (2005)
  - Total: 1,267
- Time zone: UTC-6 (Central Standard Time)

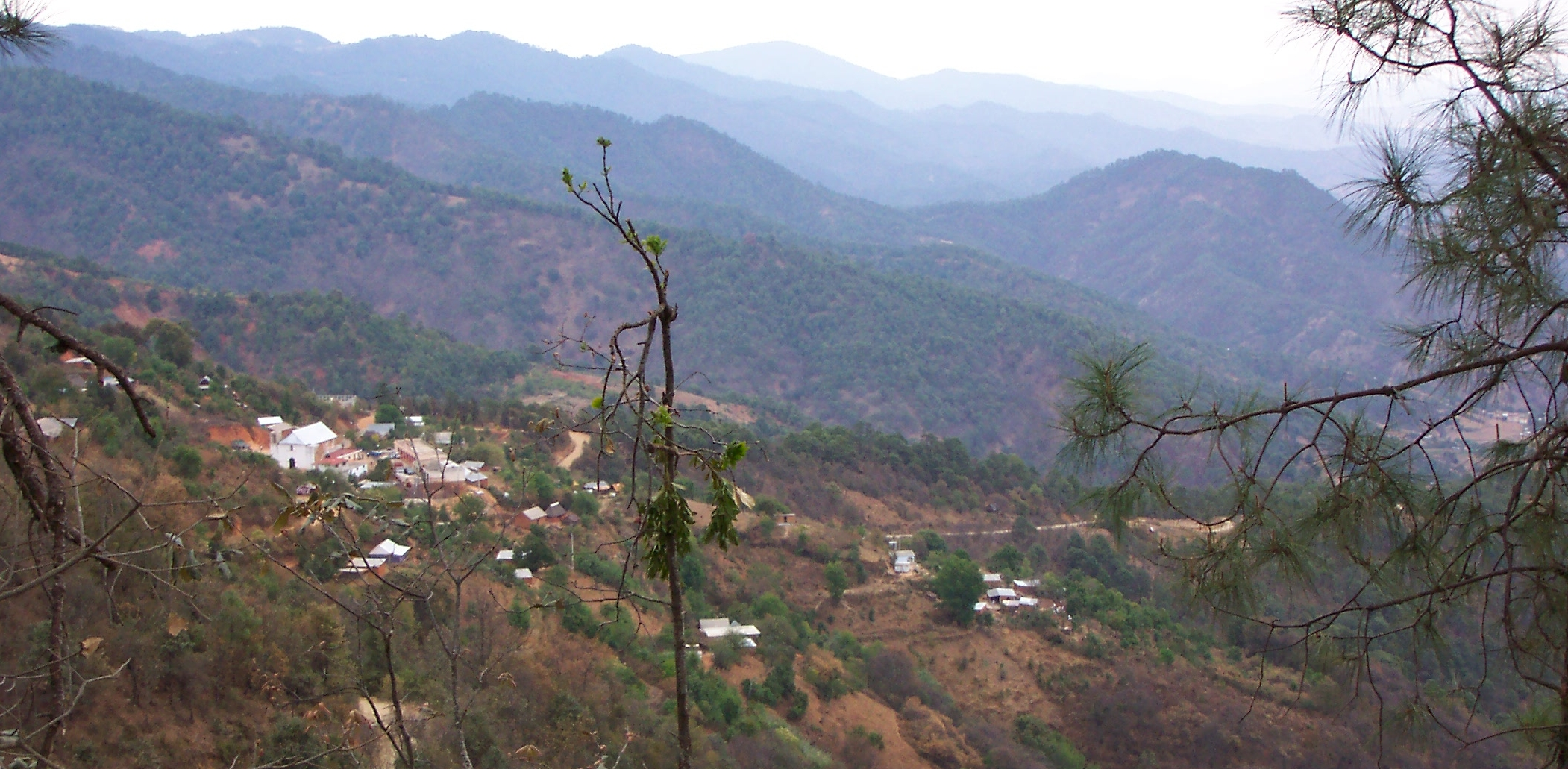
View of the Municipal Head of San Pablo Cuatro Venados.

San Pablo Cuatro Venados is a town and municipality in Oaxaca in south-western Mexico. The municipality covers an area of 59.96 km^{2}. It is part of the Zaachila District in the west of the Valles Centrales Region.

As of 2005, the municipality had a total population of 1,267.

Zaachila Zapotec is spoken in the town.
