= KOKO-LP =

- Hana, Hawaii; United States
- Frequency: 96.3 MHz
- Branding: 96.3 KOKO FM

Programming
- Format: Hawaiian music

Ownership
- Owner: KOKO FM

Technical information
- Licensing authority: FCC
- Facility ID: 192892
- Class: LP1
- ERP: 100 watts
- HAAT: −187 meters (−614 ft)
- Transmitter coordinates: 20°45′23.7″N 155°59′8.4″W

Links
- Public license information: LMS
- Webcast: Listen live
- Website: www.kokolp.org

KOKO-LP (96.3 FM, "96.3 KOKO FM") is a radio station licensed to serve the community of Hana, Hawaii. The station is owned by KOKO FM and airs a Hawaiian music format.

The station was assigned the KOKO-LP call letters by the Federal Communications Commission on February 10, 2015.
