= Trinidad Zaachila =

- Municipality and town
- Location in Mexico
- Coordinates: 16.9167°N 96.8°W
- Country: Mexico
- State: Oaxaca
- District: Zaachila District

Area
  - Total: 21.3 km^{2} (8.2 sq mi)

Population (2020)
  - Total: 3,419
- Time zone: UTC-6 (Central Standard Time)

Trinidad Zaachila is a town and municipality in Oaxaca in south-western Mexico. The municipality covers an area of 21.3 km^{2}. It is part of the Zaachila District in the west of the Valles Centrales Region.

As of 2020, the municipality had a total population of 3419 .
