= WJAA =

- Austin, Indiana; United States
- Frequency: 96.3 MHz
- Branding: Radio 96.3

Programming
- Format: Album oriented rock
- Affiliations: Motor Racing Network

Ownership
- Owner: Rebecca Campbell; (Social Butterfly Media, LLC.)

History
- First air date: 1991

Technical information
- Licensing authority: FCC
- Facility ID: 42022
- Class: A
- ERP: 3,000 watts
- HAAT: 100 meters
- Transmitter coordinates: 38°50′39.00″N 85°49′26.00″W

Links
- Public license information: Public file; LMS
- Webcast: Listen Live
- Website: wjaa.net

WJAA (96.3 FM) is a radio station broadcasting an album oriented rock format. Licensed to Austin, Indiana, United States, the station is currently owned by Rebecca and Brent Schepman, through licensee Social Butterfly Media, LLC., and features programming from Motor Racing Network.

Former logo
