= KOUS-LP =

- Monroe, Louisiana; United States
- Broadcast area: Monroe area
- Frequency: 96.3 MHz

Programming
- Format: Urban Oldies

Ownership
- Owner: Mahogony's Incubation System, Inc

History
- First air date: May 19, 2003

Technical information
- Licensing authority: FCC
- Facility ID: 124733
- ERP: 93 watts
- HAAT: 31 meters (102 ft)
- Transmitter coordinates: 32°26′02″N 92°06′17″W

Links
- Public license information: LMS
- Webcast: KOUS Stream
- Website: kouslive.com

KOUS-LP (96.3 FM) is an urban oldies formatted radio station in Monroe, Louisiana.
