= KRIM-LP =

- Payson, Arizona; United States
- Frequency: 96.3 MHz

Programming
- Format: Classic hits

Ownership
- Owner: Payson Council For The Musical Arts Inc.

History
- First air date: June 5, 2002

Technical information
- Licensing authority: FCC
- Facility ID: 134059
- Class: L1
- ERP: 8 watts
- HAAT: 102.9 meters (338 feet)
- Transmitter coordinates: 34°16′00″N 111°18′54″W

Links
- Public license information: LMS
- Webcast: Listen Live
- Website: krimfm.com

KRIM-LP (96.3 FM) is a radio station licensed to serve Payson, Arizona.

== Programming and administration ==
The community-oriented station is owned by Payson Council For The Musical Arts Inc. It airs music from the 1950s through the 1990s. The station's general manager is Chris Higgins.

The station was assigned the KRIM-LP call letters by the Federal Communications Commission on June 5, 2002.
