= KZXL =

- Hudson, Texas; United States
- Broadcast area: Lufkin-Nacogdoches
- Frequency: 96.3 MHz
- Branding: Hot 96.3

Programming
- Format: Urban contemporary

Ownership
- Owner: Pentagon Communications, LLC

History
- First air date: June 18, 2002 (as KLSN)
- Former call signs: KLSN (2001–2008); KLJK (2008–2009)

Technical information
- Licensing authority: FCC
- Facility ID: 77846
- Class: C2
- ERP: 13,500 watts
- HAAT: 153 meters (502 ft)
- Transmitter coordinates: 31°20′05.00″N 94°40′10.00″W

Links
- Public license information: Public file; LMS
- Website: KZXL on Facebook

KZXL (96.3 FM) is a radio station licensed to Hudson, Texas, United States. The station serves the Lufkin-Nacogdoches area. The station is owned by Pentagon Communications.

== History ==
KZXL was first proposed by Harold J. Haley Jr., the son of longtime Livingston, Texas, radio broadcaster Harold J. Haley Sr., who owned and operated KETX, KETX-FM and KETX-LP. A construction permit to build the facility was granted by the Federal Communications Commission on March 20, 2001. The facility was built and received its license to cover on June 18, 2002. The station was originally programmed with a classic country format, branded as "Cat Country".

The station was assigned the call sign KLSN on October 12, 2001, during construction of the facility. The station changed its call sign to KLJK on July 4, 2008, and to the current KZXL on March 3, 2009.
