= KTTG =

- Mena, Arkansas; United States
- Broadcast area: Hot Springs/Fort Smith, Arkansas
- Frequency: 96.3 MHz
- Branding: ESPN Arkansas

Programming
- Format: Sports
- Affiliations: ESPN Radio

Ownership
- Owner: Pearson Broadcasting of Mena

History
- First air date: July 25, 1990
- Former call signs: KOUA (July 25, 1990 - July 17, 1995)

Technical information
- Licensing authority: FCC
- Facility ID: 71487
- Class: C1
- ERP: 47,000 watts
- HAAT: 401 meters (1,316 ft)
- Transmitter coordinates: 34°41′24″N 93°56′35″W
- Translator: 92.5 K223CO (Tremonton, UT)

Links
- Public license information: Public file; LMS
- Webcast: Listen live
- Website: hitthatline.com

KTTG (96.3 FM, "ESPN Arkansas") is a radio station broadcasting a Sports radio format. Licensed to Mena, Arkansas, United States, the station serves the Hot Springs and Fort Smith. The station is currently owned by Pearson Broadcasting of Mena and features programming from ESPN Radio.

== Programming ==
KTTG airs local programming and national programming. Local programming includes "The Morning Rush" with Derek Ruscin, Tommy Craft, Tyler Wilson and Nick Mason. The Dan LeBatard Show, The Ryen Russcilo Show, Sports Talk with Bo Mattingly and The Paul Finebaum Show. KTTG carries Arkansas Razorbacks football, basketball, and baseball.

National programming, from ESPN Radio, includes Canty, Evan and Michelle, Greeny, GameNight, The Paul Finebaum Show and SportsCenter All Night.
