= KZMX-FM =

- Hot Springs, South Dakota; United States
- Frequency: 96.3 MHz
- Branding: 96 The Mix

Programming
- Format: Classic rock

Ownership
- Owner: Mt. Rushmore Broadcasting, Inc.
- Sister stations: KZMX (AM), KFCR

History
- First air date: May 7, 1981; 44 years ago
- Former call signs: KOBH-FM (1981–1986)
- Former frequencies: 96.7 MHz (1981–2022)

Technical information
- Licensing authority: FCC
- Facility ID: 46712
- Class: A
- ERP: 1,400 watts horizontal
- HAAT: 135 meters
- Transmitter coordinates: 43°26′34″N 103°27′27″W

Links
- Public license information: Public file; LMS

KZMX-FM (96.3 FM) is a radio station licensed to Hot Springs, South Dakota, United States. The station is owned by Mt. Rushmore Broadcasting, Inc.

== History ==
The station was assigned the call letters KOBH-FM on February 13, 1981. On June 20, 1986, the station changed its call sign to KZMX-FM. The original KOBH call letters were used by a Black Hills area station starting in 1936, which later became the prominent KOTA in Rapid City.

While the current format is Classic Rock under the branding "96 The Mix," records from the mid-1990s indicate the station was broadcasting an Oldies format around 1996.

On May 18, 2012, the Federal Communications Commission (FCC) fined KZMX-FM and its sister station, KZMX (AM) $21,500 for various violations, including operation of the stations without any staff present, inability to reach the station's staff, and using an incorrect type of antenna for broadcasting.

The station along with others owned by Mt. Rushmore Broadcasting filed for an extension of the special temporary authority in early 2015, due to staffing issues. It was reported that staff had unexpectedly resigned, and there was difficulty finding new employees.

In late 2016, the station returned to the air from its licensed facility, but on exciter power which is significantly less than the licensed effective radiated power. It was reported to be running a classic rock format.

Effective June 24, 2022, KZMX-FM moved from 96.7 FM to 96.3 FM, to make room for KRCF 96.7 FM Lead, South Dakota's sign-on.
