= KWEW-LP =

- Wenatchee, Washington; United States
- Frequency: 96.3 MHz
- Branding: Fearless 96.3

Programming
- Format: Christian

Ownership
- Owner: Wenatchee Youth Radio

Technical information
- Licensing authority: FCC
- Facility ID: 135720
- Class: L1
- ERP: 95 watts
- HAAT: 3.3 meters (11 ft)
- Transmitter coordinates: 47°29′37.00″N 120°19′14.00″W

Links
- Public license information: LMS
- Website: fearless963.com

KWEW-LP (96.3 FM, "Fearless 96.3") is a radio station broadcasting a Christian music format. Licensed to Wenatchee, Washington, United States, the station is currently owned by Wenatchee Youth Radio.
