= Zaachila District =

- District
- Oaxaca regions and districts: Valles Centrales in the center
- Coordinates: 16°57′N 96°44′W
- Country: Mexico
- State: Oaxaca

Population (2020)
  - Total: 60,956

Zaachila District is located in the west of the Valles Centrales Region of the State of Oaxaca, Mexico. The district includes the municipalities of San Antonio Huitepec, San Miguel Peras, San Pablo Cuatro Venados, Santa Inés del Monte, Trinidad Zaachila and Villa de Zaachila.

== Municipalities ==
Municipality code	Name	Population		Land Area			Population density	
Municipality code	Name	2020	Rank	km^{2}	sq mi	Rank	2020	Rank
108	San Antonio Huitepec	2,936	4	191.4	73.9	1	15/km^{2} (40/sq mi)	6
273	San Miguel Peras	3,818	2	155.2	59.9	2	25/km^{2} (64/sq mi)	5
292	San Pablo Cuatro Venados	1,510	6	73.78	28.49	4	20/km^{2} (53/sq mi)	16
388	Santa Inés del Monte	2,809	5	49.10	18.96	5	57/km^{2} (148/sq mi)	3
555	Trinidad Zaachila	3,419	3	21.31	8.23	6	160/km^{2} (416/sq mi)	2
565	Villa de Zaachila	46,464	1	81.42	31.44	3	571/km^{2} (1,478/sq mi)	1
	Distrito Zaachila	60,956	—	572	220.85	—	107/km^{2} (276/sq mi)	—
Source: INEGI

=== Largest cities ===
Largest cities or towns in Zaachila Distric Source:
Rank		Municipality	Pop.
1	Villa de Zaachila	Villa de Zaachila	16,788
2	Vicente Guerrero	Villa de Zaachila	15,910
3	Ninguno	Villa de Zaachila	3,683
4	Fraccionamiento Real del Valle	Villa de Zaachila	1,906
5	San Antonio Huitepec	San Antonio Huitepec	1,462
6	Colonia 24 de Julio	Villa de Zaachila	1,309
7	Colonia El Manantial	Villa de Zaachila	1,223
8	Trinidad Zaachila	Trinidad Zaachila	1,111
9	San Miguel Peras	San Miguel Peras	1,055
10	Emiliano Zapata	Villa de Zaachila	1,051
