= KKJC-LP =

- McMinnville, Oregon; United States
- Frequency: 93.5 MHz

Programming
- Format: Religious Talk

Ownership
- Owner: Calvary Chapel of McMinnville, Inc

Technical information
- Licensing authority: FCC
- Facility ID: 135679
- Class: L1
- ERP: 100 watts
- HAAT: 17.0 meters (55.8 ft)
- Transmitter coordinates: 45°9′39″N 123°9′14″W

Links
- Public license information: LMS
- Website: Official website

KKJC-LP (93.5 FM) is a radio station broadcasting a Religious Talk format licensed to McMinnville, Oregon, United States. The station is currently owned by Calvary Chapel of Mcminnville, Inc.

On 2 July 2009, KKJC was granted Special Temporary Authority to change its frequency to 93.5 MHz.

At 12:15 P.M. on 17 Nov 2009, KKJC commenced operations on 93.5 MHz.
