= KTDR =

Radio station in Del Rio, Texas

- Del Rio, Texas; United States
- Broadcast area: Del Rio area
- Frequency: 96.3 MHz
- Branding: The Best

Programming
- Format: Hot adult contemporary
- Affiliations: Fox Sports Radio

Ownership
- Owner: MBM Radio Del Rio, LLC
- Sister stations: KVDR

History
- First air date: March 31, 1986

Technical information
- Licensing authority: FCC
- Facility ID: 24793
- Class: C1
- ERP: 51,000 watts
- HAAT: 154 meters
- Transmitter coordinates: 29°32′25.00″N 101°7′21.00″W

Links
- Public license information: Public file; LMS
- Webcast: s01.digitalserver.org/8038/stream
- Website: www.radiodelrio.com

KTDR (96.3 FM) is a radio station broadcasting a hot adult contemporary format. Licensed to Del Rio, Texas, United States, the station is currently owned by RCommunications Group.
