= WFXY =

- Middlesboro, Kentucky; United States
- Frequency: 1490 kHz
- Branding: 98 Rock

Programming
- Format: Classic rock
- Affiliations: ABC News Radio

Ownership
- Owner: Penelope, Inc.
- Sister stations: WQJM

History
- First air date: March 1, 1969 (as WAFI at 1560)
- Former call signs: WAFI (1969–1976)
- Former frequencies: 1560 kHz (1969–1982)
- Call sign meaning: "Foxy" (previous branding)

Technical information
- Licensing authority: FCC
- Facility ID: 14070
- Class: C
- Power: 1,000 watts unlimited
- Transmitter coordinates: 36°36′47″N 83°42′34″W
- Translator: 98.3 W252EE (Middlesboro)

Links
- Public license information: Public file; LMS
- Webcast: Listen Live
- Website: foxyfm983.com

WFXY (1490 AM) is a radio station broadcasting a classic rock format to the Middlesboro, Kentucky, United States, area. The station is currently owned by Penelope, Inc. and features programming from ABC News Radio.

== History ==
WFXY signed on in 1969, with the call letters WAFI at 1560 kHz. Programming included a full-service format with pop and country music. In the late 1970s, the station moved to a full-time Top 40 format and changed to the current frequency to add nighttime service. Currently, WFXY broadcasts from a tower site on Bloomsbury Avenue in Middlesboro, 24 hours per day. The 1490 kHz frequency was originally occupied by station WMIK in Middlesboro from its sign-on date in 1948. WMIK, now a Southern Gospel station, moved to its present frequency at 560 kHz after the station's owners purchased Middlesboro station WCPM in May 1950. When WMIK changed frequencies, the 1490 kHz frequency remained unused until 1977. During that year, the station's frequency and call letters were changed; WAFI at 1560 kHz became WFXY at 1490 kHz. A few months later, WFXY moved its tower and transmitter from a location off US-25E to its present location.

In late 2005, WFXY and its parent company, Countrywide Broadcasters, Inc., were acquired by Joshua Wilkey, a North Carolina businessman who moved to Middlesboro to run WFXY and sister station WANO. The station has since dropped the satellite format it was airing (Westwood One/Dial Global's "Bright AC") in favor of local DJs and automation.

In 2009, the station was sold to Penelope, Inc. During a studio move and upgrading of equipment, the station simulcasted the sister station's programming until June 1, 2013.

On June 1, 2013, WFXY changed their format from country (simulcasting WANO 1230 AM) to classic hits, branded as "Foxy 1490". Bringing back the original sound of FOXY Radio that dominated the local market since 1969.

On October 14, 2018, the station went discontinued because a local man crashed his truck into the station's transmitter tower in an apparent act of vandalism. Joshua Lee was arrested the next day. Station owner Frank Smith said it may take 2–3 months to repair the transmitter and get the station back playing.
