= WRNK-LP =

- Lanett, Alabama; United States
- Frequency: 96.3 MHz
- Branding: 96.3 Keeper FM

Programming
- Format: Religious

Ownership
- Owner: Contact Ministry Center

History
- First air date: May 11, 2004

Technical information
- Licensing authority: FCC
- Facility ID: 133833
- Class: L1
- ERP: 100 watts
- HAAT: 4 meters (13 feet)
- Transmitter coordinates: 32°52′26″N 85°11′32″W

Links
- Public license information: LMS
- Webcast: Listen Live
- Website: http://wrnk.org/

WRNK-LP (96.3 FM, "96.3 Keeper FM") is a radio station licensed to serve Lanett, Alabama. The station is owned by Contact Ministry Center. It airs a Religious radio format as a ministry extension of Contact Ministries Center and Pastor John Eldridge.

The station was assigned the WRNK-LP call letters by the Federal Communications Commission on December 9, 2002.

WRNK-LP was a recipient of the John Allen Smith Outstanding Volunteer Award for 2005.
