= KRNQ =

Bott Radio Network station in Keokuk, Iowa

Coordinates: 40.400°N 91.586°W

- Keokuk, Iowa; United States
- Broadcast area: Keokuk, Iowa; Burlington, Iowa; Quincy, Illinois
- Frequency: 96.3 MHz
- Branding: Bott Radio Network

Programming
- Format: Christian Talk and Teaching Religious
- Affiliations: Bott Radio Network

Ownership
- Owner: Bott Broadcasting; (Community Broadcasting, Inc.)

History
- First air date: November 5, 1996
- Call sign meaning: Keokuk's Rock N' Roll Quality! (previous format)

Technical information
- Licensing authority: FCC
- Facility ID: 15773
- Class: C2
- ERP: 19,000 watts
- HAAT: 245 meters
- Translators: K227CH (93.3 MHz, Hannibal, MO)

Links
- Public license information: Public file; LMS
- Webcast: Listen live
- Website: bottradionetwork.com

KRNQ (96.3 FM) is an American radio station licensed to Keokuk, Iowa, United States. The station is currently owned by Bott Broadcasting, through licensee Community Broadcasting, Inc., and airs Bott Radio Network Christian Bible teaching and talk programming.
