= WTSW-LP =

- Manitowoc, Wisconsin; United States
- Frequency: 96.3 MHz
- Branding: The Sustaining Word

Programming
- Format: Religious
- Affiliations: VCY America

Ownership
- Owner: Calvary Chapel of Manitowoc, Inc.

History
- First air date: 2017-02-14
- Call sign meaning: The Sustaining Word

Technical information
- Licensing authority: FCC
- Facility ID: 132217
- Class: L1
- ERP: 100 watts
- HAAT: −2.0 m (−7 ft)
- Transmitter coordinates: 44°5′6.00″N 87°39′39.00″W

Links
- Public license information: LMS
- Webcast: Listen live
- Website: wtswlp.org

WTSW-LP (96.3 FM, "The Sustaining Word") is a radio station broadcasting a religious format. Licensed to Manitowoc, Wisconsin, United States, the station is currently owned by the Calvary Chapel of Manitowoc. The network is locally programmed with an affiliation with VCY America, and unrelated to the Calvary Radio Network across the Midwest.
