= WPKM-LP =

- Parkersburg, West Virginia; United States
- Broadcast area: Metro Parkersburg
- Frequency: 96.3 MHz
- Branding: The Beet

Programming
- Format: Adult album alternative

Ownership
- Owner: West Virginia University at Parkersburg; (West Virginia University at Parkersburg Journalism Department)

History
- First air date: September 22, 2014
- Call sign meaning: Parkersburg M

Technical information
- Licensing authority: FCC
- Facility ID: 193247
- Class: L1
- ERP: 100 watts
- HAAT: −2.3 meters (−7.5 ft)
- Transmitter coordinates: 39°12′59.0″N 81°30′20.0″W

Links
- Public license information: LMS
- Webcast: Listen live
- Website: wpkmradio.com

WPKM-LP is an Adult Album Alternative formatted broadcast radio station licensed to Parkersburg, West Virginia, serving Metro Parkersburg. WPKM-LP is owned and operated by West Virginia University at Parkersburg.
