= 96three FM =

96three
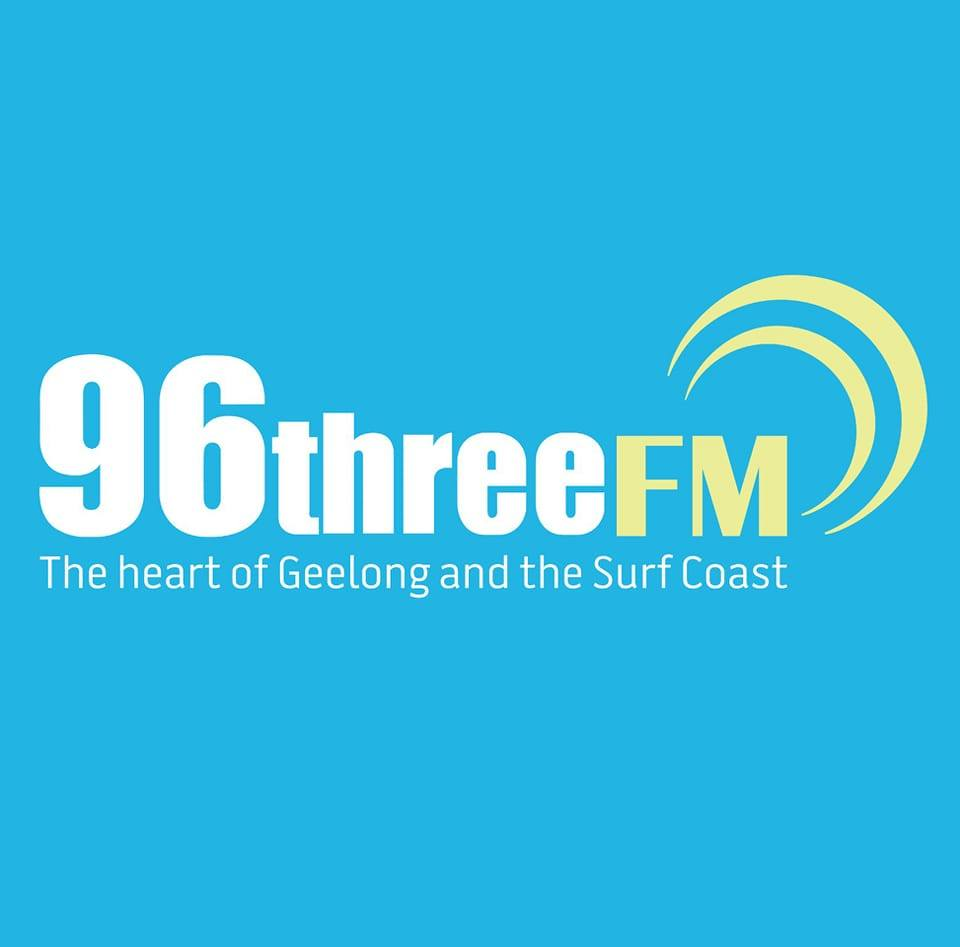
- Geelong, Victoria; Australia
- Broadcast area: Geelong, Melbourne
- Frequency: 96.3 MHz FM

Programming
- Language: English
- Format: Christian contemporary

Ownership
- Owner: 96three FM; (Geelong Christian Media Inc.)

History
- First air date: 1 September 1994
- Former call signs: Rhema Geelong

Technical information
- Transmitter coordinates: 38°09′46″S 144°36′12″E

Links
- Webcast: Listen To 96three
- Website: www.96three.com.au

96three is a Christian radio station serving Geelong and surrounding areas, including Melbourne. Its studios are based in the Geelong suburb of Grovedale.

== Programming ==
As of 2026, the featured on-air line-up consists of:

- The Breakfast Show, hosted by Priscilla Naidu from 6:00 am – 9:00 am weekdays
- The Daily, hosted by Cam Want from 3:00 pm – 6:00 pm weekdays
- The Home Stretch, hosted by DJ Paine from 6:00 pm – 8:00 pm weekdays
- The Big Picture In Sport, hosted by Wes Cusworth on Saturday mornings from 9:00 am – 10:00 am
- Everyday People, hosted by Euan Burns on Saturdays & Sundays from 5:00 pm – 6:00 pm & 7:00 pm – 8:00 pm
- Sunday Mornings with Joy, hosted by Joy Ravela on Sundays from 9:00 am – 12:00 pm
