= KCOT (FM) =

- Cotulla, Texas; United States
- Frequency: 96.3 MHz
- Branding: La Mejor

Programming
- Format: Regional Mexican
- Affiliations: MVS Radio

Ownership
- Owner: José Antonio Aguilar; (First FM Cotulla LLC)

History
- First air date: 2011
- Call sign meaning: COTulla

Technical information
- Licensing authority: FCC
- Facility ID: 171010
- Class: A
- ERP: 300 watts
- HAAT: 5.4 meters (18 ft)
- Transmitter coordinates: 28°25′57.7″N 99°14′1″W

Links
- Public license information: Public file; LMS
- Website: lamejor.com.mx/cotulla

KCOT is a radio station on 96.3 FM in Cotulla, Texas. It is owned by José Antonio Aguilar, through licensee First FM Cotulla LLC, and carries La Mejor Regional Mexican format from MVS Radio.

== History ==
KCOT was licensed in 2009 and received its callsign in January 2011. It was owned by KM Communications and promptly sold to its current owner before even coming to air.

KCOT holds a construction permit to become a Class C3 station with 25 kW ERP from a 100 meters (330 ft) tower.
