= KCAH-LP =

- Carthage, Missouri; United States
- Frequency: 96.3 MHz

Programming
- Language: Spanish

Ownership
- Owner: Iglesia Cristiana Hispano-Americana

History
- Former frequencies: 107.9 MHz (2008–2019)

Technical information
- Licensing authority: FCC
- Facility ID: 131696
- Class: L1
- ERP: 100 watts
- HAAT: 12.8 meters (42 ft)
- Transmitter coordinates: 37°10′6″N 94°18′34″W

Links
- Public license information: LMS

KCAH-LP (96.3 FM) is a radio station licensed to Carthage, Missouri, United States. The station is currently owned by Iglesia Cristiana Hispano-Americana.
