= KZMX (AM) =

Simulcasting KZMX-FM Hot Springs
- Hot Springs, South Dakota; United States
- Frequency: 580 kHz
- Branding: 96 The Mix

Programming
- Format: Classic rock

Ownership
- Owner: Mt. Rushmore Broadcasting, Inc.
- Sister stations: KZMX-FM, KFCR

History
- First air date: November 21, 1988; 37 years ago

Technical information
- Licensing authority: FCC
- Facility ID: 46713
- Class: B
- Power: 2,300 watts (day); 310 watts (night)
- Transmitter coordinates: 43°27′24″N 103°28′34″W
- Translator: 98.3 K252GD (Hot Springs)

Links
- Public license information: Public file; LMS

KZMX (580 AM) is a radio station licensed to Hot Springs, South Dakota, United States, the station is owned by Mt. Rushmore Broadcasting, Inc.

The station carries a classic rock format.

== History ==
KZMX first signed on the air on November 21, 1988, broadcasting on a frequency of 580 kHz with a licensed day power of 2,300 watts and a night power of 310 watts.

On May 18, 2012, the Federal Communications Commission fined KZMX AM and its sister station, KZMX-FM, a combined $21,500 fine for various violations, including operation of the stations without any staff present, and inability to reach the station's staff.

The station along with others owned by Mt. Rushmore Broadcasting filed for an extension of the special temporary authority in early 2015, due to staffing issues. It was reported that staff had unexpectedly resigned, and there was difficulty finding new employees.

In late 2016, the station returned to the air from its licensed facility, but on exciter power which is significantly less than the licensed effective radiated power. It was reported to be running a classic rock format, however has stunted with CCM in summer 2020.
