= WQLA =

- La Follette, Tennessee; United States
- Frequency: 960 kHz
- Branding: 95.9 Rocks

Programming
- Format: Classic rock

Ownership
- Owner: Ronald C. Meredith; (Clinton Broadcasters, Inc.)

History
- First air date: September 1, 1983
- Former call signs: WWGR (1982–1991); WQLA (1991–1995); WGLH (1995–2007)

Technical information
- Licensing authority: FCC
- Facility ID: 36231
- Class: D
- Power: 1,000 watts day 33 watts night
- Transmitter coordinates: 36°22′2.00″N 84°8′50.00″W
- Translator: 95.9 W240DT (La Follette)

Links
- Public license information: Public file; LMS
- Website: 959rocks.com

WQLA (960 AM) is a radio station licensed to La Follette, Tennessee.

== History ==
On September 1, 1983, WQLA went on the air as WWGR.

On September 6, 2014, Jenn Media, Inc., completed the sale of WQLA to Michael and Sue Beverly's Beverly Broadcasting Co., LLC.

Effective May 5, 2016, Beverly Broadcasting sold WQLA to Ron Meredith’s Clinton Broadcasters, Inc. Coincidentally, WQLA changed their format from classic hits to classic country, simulcasting WYSH 1380 AM Clinton, TN. Meredith has grown the station to be a favorite in the Campbell County area of East Tennessee.

On May 1, 2022, WQLA dropped its simulcast with WYSH and changed their format from classic country to classic rock, branded as "95.9 Rocks".
