= WILW-LP =

Low-power FM radio station in Waupaca, Wisconsin, United States

Coordinates: 44.3594230°N 89.0970022°W

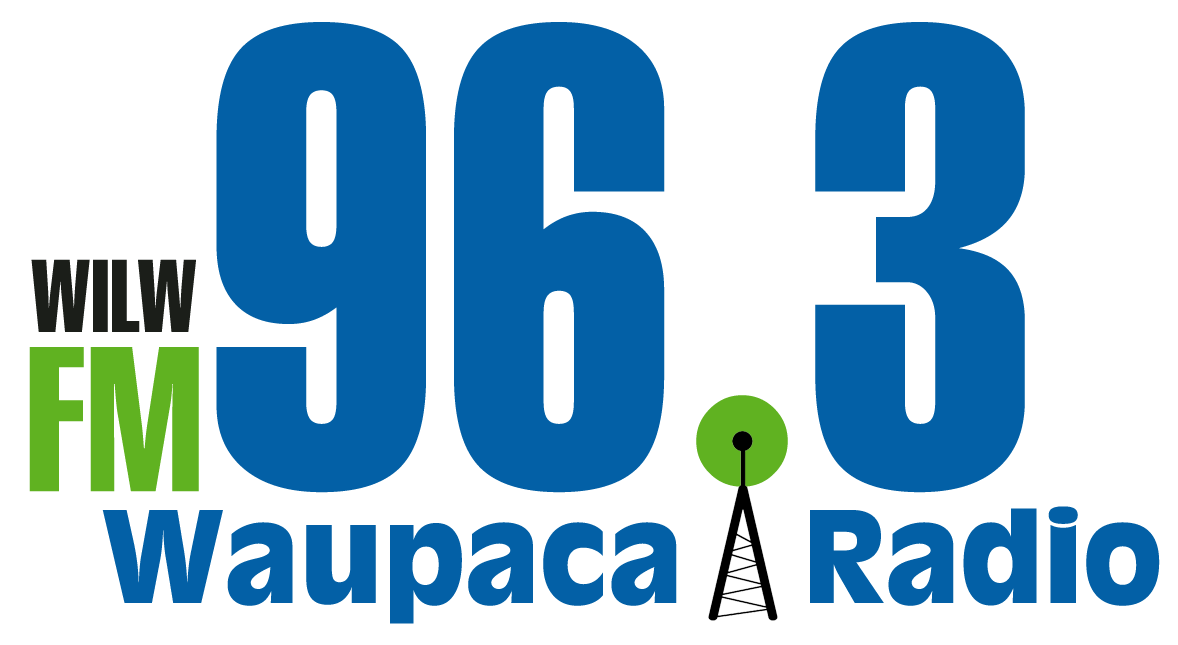
- Waupaca, Wisconsin; United States
- Broadcast area: Waupaca
- Frequency: 96.3 MHz
- Branding: Waupaca Radio FM 96.3

Programming
- Format: AAA, polka, talk

Ownership
- Owner: City of Waupaca
- Sister stations: Win-TV / Charter Cable 991

History
- First air date: June 18, 2015
- Call sign meaning: We/I Love Waupaca

Technical information
- Licensing authority: FCC
- Facility ID: 193884
- Class: LP100
- ERP: 47 watts
- HAAT: 35 meters

Links
- Public license information: LMS
- Website: www.cityofwaupaca.org/wintv/radio/

WILW-LP is a low power FM radio station licensed to Waupaca, Wisconsin broadcasting at 96.3 MHz. WILW-LP is licensed to and operated by the City of Waupaca co-located with the city's cable access TV station (Win-TV) in the Community Media department.

WILW-LP signed on and has continuously operated since Thursday, June 18, 2015 at approximately 7:20pm. The station first broadcast with a broad mix of Oldies and promotional announcements that a new radio station was coming soon to Waupaca. “Waupaca Radio” officially launched on Thursday, July 16 at 11:30am with city staff, donors and the public invited and in the studio.

“Waupaca Radio” serves the Waupaca community by “connecting the citizens of the Waupaca area with the activities of their government and community.” This is accomplished in five areas 1) Public Safety programming; 2) government transparency; 3) expansion of cable access TV station programming to radio; 4) community access to the radio station and 5) entertainment programming.

“Waupaca Radio FM 96.3” broadcasts polka music every morning; AAA music, audio from government meetings and community events and music from Wisconsin bands in the evening. Several community volunteers are involved with the station, side by side with city staff. As a result of Waupaca Radio, Waupaca Local Live is a radio/TV program created as a joint effort of the city of Waupaca Community Media department and Waupaca Community Arts Board to highlight local and regional talent.
