= WSCQ-LP =

- Sun City Center, Florida; United States
- Frequency: 96.3 MHz
- Branding: Sun Radio 96.3 FM

Programming
- Format: Community radio

Ownership
- Owner: Sun City Center Radio, Inc.

History
- Former call signs: WYYE-LP (2014)

Technical information
- Licensing authority: FCC
- Facility ID: 192086
- Class: L1
- ERP: 91 watts
- HAAT: 31 metres (102 ft)
- Transmitter coordinates: 27°42′29″N 82°21′20″W

Links
- Public license information: LMS
- Webcast: Listen Live
- Website: Official Website

WSCQ-LP (96.3 FM) is a radio station licensed to serve the community of Sun City Center, Florida. The station is owned by Sun City Center Radio, Inc. It airs a community radio format.

The station was assigned the call sign WYYE-LP by the Federal Communications Commission on April 8, 2014. A week later, on April 15, the station changed its call sign to WSCQ-LP
