= WYSH =

- Clinton, Tennessee; United States
- Broadcast area: Knoxville
- Frequency: 1380 kHz
- Branding: WYSH AM 1380

Programming
- Format: Classic Country
- Affiliations: Westwood One; Motor Racing Network

Ownership
- Owner: Clinton Broadcasters, Inc. Ron Meredith, President
- Sister stations: WQLA

History
- First air date: 1960

Technical information
- Licensing authority: FCC
- Facility ID: 12049
- Class: D
- Power: 1,000 watts day 80 watts night
- Transmitter coordinates: 36°6′48.00″N 84°8′30.00″W
- Translators: 99.5 W258DG (Clinton); 101.1 W266AM (Oak Ridge)

Links
- Public license information: Public file; LMS
- Webcast: Listen live
- Website: wyshradio.com

WYSH (1380 AM) is a radio station broadcasting a classic country music format. Licensed to serve Clinton, Tennessee, United States, the station serves the Knoxville area. WYSH signed on in 1960. The station is currently owned by Clinton Broadcasters, Inc. President Ronald C Meredith Jr, and features a Classic Hit Country format and airs NASCAR racing on the Motor Racing Network and the Performance Racing Network . WYSH's programming can also be heard on FM at 101.1 MHz over translator W266AM, which operates at 250 watts and at 99.5 FM W258DG at 250 watts. Currently WYSH simulcasts over WQLA in LaFollette, TN on AM 960 and over translator W240DT at 95.9 FM WQLA is another station owned by Meredith’s Clinton Broadcasters, Inc Meredith currently hosts The Country Club Morning show with Jim Harris and has since purchasing the station in 1990.

Logo before 99.5 translator sign on
