= KFCR =

Currently silent
- Custer, South Dakota; United States
- Broadcast area: Rapid City, South Dakota
- Frequency: 1490 kHz

Ownership
- Owner: Mt. Rushmore Broadcasting, Inc.
- Sister stations: KZMX

History
- First air date: May 1, 1988

Technical information
- Licensing authority: FCC
- Facility ID: 43913
- Class: C
- Power: 830 watts (unlimited)
- Transmitter coordinates: 43°43′03″N 103°35′00″W

Links
- Public license information: Public file; LMS

KFCR (1490 AM) is a radio station licensed to Custer, South Dakota, United States. The station serves the Rapid City area. The station is currently owned by Mt. Rushmore Broadcasting, Inc. Currently, the station is silent.

== History ==
KFCR first went on the air on May 1, 1988, as a local voice for Custer County. Since the mid-2010s, the station has been plagued by operational inconsistency. It has frequently operated under Special Temporary Authority (STA) to remain silent, often citing "staffing issues" and the "unexpected resignation" of essential employees.

The station’s status remains volatile. Most recently, on June 30, 2025, official regulatory records indicated that the facility was silent once again. Broadcast logs from the National Radio Club confirm that these periods of silence have been a recurring theme throughout the 2020s, typically attributed to financial constraints or personnel shortages.

KFCR is owned by Mt. Rushmore Broadcasting, Inc., an independent media group based in Casper, Wyoming. The company operates a cluster of stations in the Black Hills region, including KZMX (AM). Ownership has been marked by regulatory scrutiny, particularly regarding the maintenance of minimum operating schedules. In previous years, parent company Mt. Rushmore Broadcasting entered into consent decrees with the FCC to preserve licenses after prolonged periods of silence across its multi-station portfolio.

In August 2016, the station reported to the FCC that it had resumed broadcasting.
