= KARC-LP =

- Oroville, California; United States
- Frequency: 96.3 FM

Programming
- Format: Religious Teaching

Ownership
- Owner: Calvary Chapel Oroville

History
- First air date: July 15, 2015

Technical information
- Licensing authority: FCC
- ERP: 0.1 kw
- HAAT: -12.9 meters (-42.322 feet)
- Transmitter coordinates: 39.5126°N 121.5326°W

Links
- Public license information: LMS

KARC-LP is a radio station broadcasting an educational religious format on 96.3 FM out of Oroville, California. It is licensed by Calvary Chapel Oroville and it went on the air on July 15, 2015. with a range of about a mile and one-fifth. In early 2017, its application as a low power FM station for an FCC license to cover construction was accepted. However, as of September, 2023, it was listed as active but delinquent because it had not maintained its registration with the state.
