= WQJM (AM) =

- Pineville, Kentucky; United States
- Frequency: 1230 kHz
- Branding: Jamz 98.1

Programming
- Format: Rhythmic adult contemporary
- Affiliations: ABC News Radio

Ownership
- Owner: Penelope, Inc.
- Sister stations: WFXY

History
- First air date: March 15, 1957
- Former call signs: WMLF (1957–1966); WANO (1966–2023)
- Call sign meaning: "Jamz"

Technical information
- Licensing authority: FCC
- Facility ID: 31153
- Class: C
- Power: 1,000 watts unlimited
- Transmitter coordinates: 36°46′7″N 83°42′59″W
- Translator: 98.1 W251CV (Pineville)

Links
- Public license information: Public file; LMS
- Webcast: Listen Live
- Website: jamz981.com

WQJM (1230 AM) is a radio station licensed to Pineville, Kentucky, and serving the greater Bell County community. WQJM broadcasts with a full-time signal of 1,000 watts and on translator 98.1 W251CV.

== History ==
WQJM signed on on March 15, 1957, as WMLF, with the mission of serving the Pineville community with local news and information. The station changed its call sign to WANO in 1966. On October 16, 2023, WANO changed its call sign to WQJM to launch a brand new format and branding, “JAMZ 98”. The format is a mixture of today's hot hits, R&B, and throwbacks from the '70s, '80s and '90s.

=== Ownership ===
South Bevins was the original licensee of WANO and owned the station until approximately 1995, when the station was purchased by Warren Pursifull's Cumberland Media Group. Warren had begun working at the then-WANO as a teenager, leaving after his acquisition of Countrywide Broadcasters, Inc's WFXY/Middlesboro in November 1993.

In late 2005, both WANO and WFXY were acquired by Joshua Wilkey, a North Carolina businessman who moved to Bell County to run the stations. WQJM's studios are co-located with WFXY at 2131 Cumberland Avenue in Middlesboro. WQJM's transmission facilities are located on Four Mile Road just outside the corporate limits of Pineville.

=== 2007: fire ===
Just after celebrating 50 years on the air, arsonists set fire to WANO's broadcasting facilities on the night of March 18, 2007. The result was a complete loss of the station's broadcasting equipment, leaving WANO off the air. Immediately, rebuilding efforts began, as the community rallied around the station. In record time, the station was back on the air, signing back on little more than a month later on April 20. The resulting rebuild made WANO state-of-the-art in every way, for the first time since 1957.

=== 2009: new owner ===
In March 2009 Cumberland Omnimedia LLC. sold WANO to Penelope, Inc. Heading up the media division of the company will be Frank Smith, VP/GM of Penelope, Inc. The FCC granted new ownership rights or assignment to Penelope, Inc. on October 22, 2009.

Former logo

=== 2023: call sign ===
WANO changed to WQJM, switching from a country format to hot AC, R&B, plus throwbacks.

== Programming ==
The station broadcasts a rhythmic adult contemporary format, featuring hit music and R&B oldies, as well as local newscasts and obituaries three times per day.

The station streams audio content 24/7 at jamz981.com
