= KRSP-FM =

- Salt Lake City, Utah; United States
- Broadcast area: Salt Lake City metropolitan area
- Frequency: 103.5 MHz (HD Radio)
- Branding: 103.5 The Arrow

Programming
- Format: Classic rock
- Subchannels: HD2: Deep Tracks

Ownership
- Owner: Bonneville International; (Bonneville International Corporation)
- Sister stations: Radio: KSFI, KSL, KSL-FM, KZNS, KZNS-FM; TV: KSL-TV

History
- First air date: 1967

Technical information
- Facility ID: 27462
- Class: C
- ERP: 25,000 watts
- HAAT: 1,140 meters
- Transmitter coordinates: 40°39′34″N 112°12′5″W

Links
- Webcast: Listen live Listen live (HD2)
- Website: 1035thearrow.com

KRSP-FM (103.5 MHz, "103.5 The Arrow") is a radio station in Salt Lake City, Utah. It is owned by Bonneville International, a subsidiary of Deseret Management Corporation, the for-profit arm of the Church of Jesus Christ of Latter-day Saints. KRSP-FM maintains studio facilities located at the KSL Broadcast House building in Salt Lake City's Triad Center (which also houses KSFI and the KSL (radio)-TV partners), and its transmitter is located on Farnsworth Peak in the Oquirrh Mountains, southwest of Salt Lake City.

The Arrow is home to "Smith and Sam" in the morning featuring former X96 personality Jon Smith and Sam Blake. It plays classic rock music from the 1960s, 1970s, 1980s, and 1990s and features blocks of artists during the weekends.

KRSP-HD2, the station's digital second channel, plays "Deep Tracks", lesser-known songs from well-known artists.

== History ==
=== Top 40 (1967–1980) ===
Brothers Art and Ralph Carlson (who operated A&R Meat Company) signed on KRSP (AM) in 1966 and KRSP-FM in 1967 as vehicles to advertise their meat company. Until about 1980, KRSP-FM was a top 40 competitor to KCPX.

=== Rock (1980–1994) ===
In the early 1980s, "Rock 103" was an album rock competitor to KCPX-FM. It was not until the mid-1980s, however, when the station had an established morning show (Jon and Dan) and, with virtually no rock competition, KRSP became a consistent ratings winner.

=== Classic hits/classic rock (1994–present) ===
When the Carlson family began selling their broadcast properties, the station passed into the hands of the Simmons Media Group, and on February 11, 1994, adopted an "All Rock and Roll Oldies" format. Over time, the format of "The Arrow" shifted to classic rock. The station was sold to Bonneville International in 2003, and its studios are currently located in the same building as KSL.

== Translators ==
In addition to the main station, KRSP is relayed by an additional three translators to widen its broadcast area.

Call sign	Frequency	City of license	FID	ERP (W)	Class	FCC info
K244BB	96.7 FM	Emery County, Utah	19488	100	D	LMS
K292AR	106.3 FM	Soda Springs, Idaho	8809	109	D	LMS
