= KSFI =

Adult contemporary radio station in Salt Lake City

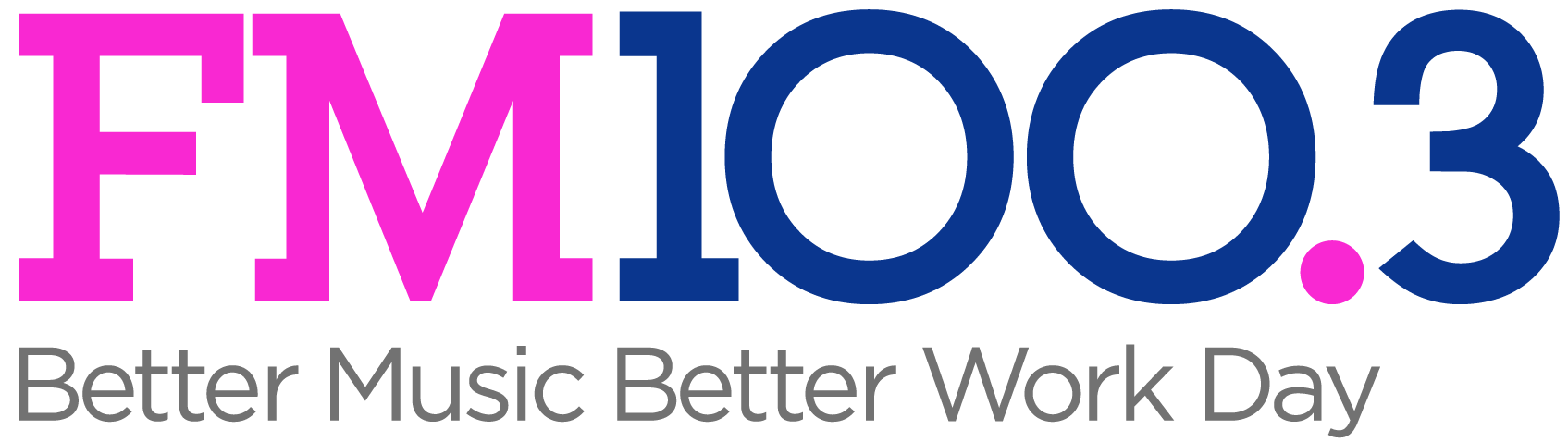
- Salt Lake City, Utah; United States
- Broadcast area: Salt Lake City-Ogden-Provo, Utah
- Frequency: 100.3 MHz (HD Radio)
- Branding: FM 100.3

Programming
- Format: Adult contemporary
- Subchannels: HD2: Sunday Sounds (worship music)

Ownership
- Owner: Bonneville International; (Bonneville International Corporation)
- Sister stations: KRSP-FM, KSL (AM), KSL-FM, KSL-TV

History
- First air date: December 26, 1946
- Former call signs: K47SL (1940–1943); KSL-FM (1943–1978)
- Call sign meaning: Simmons Family Incorporated (former owners)

Technical information
- Facility ID: 60452
- Class: C
- ERP: 25,000 watts
- HAAT: 1,140 meters (3,740 ft)
- Transmitter coordinates: 40.659°N 112.202°W

Links
- Webcast: Listen live Listen live (HD2)
- Website: fm100.com

KSFI (100.3 FM) is a radio station in Salt Lake City, Utah, United States. KSFI maintains studio facilities located at the KSL Broadcast House building in Salt Lake City's Triad Center (which also house KRSP-FM and the KSL-AM-FM-TV partners), and its transmitter is located on Farnsworth Peak in the Oquirrh Mountains, southwest of Salt Lake City.

== History ==
On October 31, 1940, the Federal Communications Commission (FCC) awarded the first fifteen commercial FM station construction permits, including an assignment for Salt Lake City on 44.7 MHz to the Radio Service Corporation of Utah, which was also the licensee of AM station KSL. The FM station was issued the call sign K47SL.

There were numerous delays before broadcasting began. In early 1941, the FCC began an investigation whether newspaper ownership of radio stations should be restricted, which put K47SL's authorization on hold, because approximately twenty percent of Radio Service Corporation of Utah stock was held by the publisher of the Salt Lake Tribune and Salt Lake Telegram newspapers. As of June 1943, K47SL was included in a list of "other construction permit authorizations outstanding for FM stations not on the air".

Effective November 1, 1943, the FCC modified its policy for FM call letters, and the station was assigned new call letters of KSL-FM. Equipment and staffing shortages resulted in additional delays, until the station commenced broadcasting on December 26, 1946, at 100.1 MHz, quickly changed to 100.3 MHz.

Originally owned by the Deseret News, it became a part of Bonneville International when the Latter Day Saints Church formed it as the parent of its broadcasting outlets in 1964. "FM 100" was a pioneer of Bonneville's "beautiful music" format, but in late 1977 it was sold to Simmons Family Incorporated.

Simmons changed the call letters to KSFI on January 6, 1978, and began adding more vocal selections to the music mix, eventually evolving the format to soft adult contemporary. Bonneville reacquired the station (along with Star 102.7 and Arrow 103.5) from Simmons in 2003. According to the website of its owner, Bonneville International, FM100 is the top-performing adult contemporary station in Utah.
