= State Mental Hospital =

State Mental Hospital may refer to:

- State Hospital, in England, UK
- Worcester State Hospital, Worcester, Massachusetts, which has been known as "State Mental Hospital"
- Utah State Hospital, Provo, Utah, USA, known formerly as "State Mental Hospital"
