= Richard P. Lindsay =

American religious leader and politician

Second Quorum of the Seventy
- April 1, 1989 – October 1, 1994
- Called by: Ezra Taft Benson
- End reason: Honorably released

Personal details
- Born: Richard Powell Lindsay; March 18, 1926; Salt Lake City, Utah, United States
- Died: June 4, 2010 (aged 84); Salt Lake City, Utah, United States

Richard Powell Lindsay (March 18, 1926 – June 4, 2010) was a Utah politician and a general authority of the Church of Jesus Christ of Latter-day Saints (LDS Church) from 1989 to 1994. He was a Democratic Utah State Senator in 1965 and a member of the Utah House of Representatives from 1973 to 1976.

== Early life and education ==
Lindsay was born in Salt Lake City, Utah to Mary Alice Powell and her husband, Samuel J. Lindsay. Samuel, who was serving as bishop of the Taylorsville Ward of the LDS Church at the time, died in 1932, leaving Mary to raise her children alone. She had been trained as a nurse and through these means was able to support the family. Lindsay was able to begin his college studies because Samuel S. Smith, a son of Joseph F. Smith who had been a bishop in the West Jordan Stake at the same time as his father, gave him a ride to the University of Utah every day. At age 18, Lindsay joined the U.S. Navy, but World War II ended before he was sent into combat and he spent most of his time in the navy in Colorado. Lindsay served as a full-time missionary for the LDS Church in Switzerland and Austria from 1946 to 1949. Lindsay earned a bachelor's degree from the University of Denver and a master's and Ph.D. degrees from the University of Utah.

== Career ==
In November 1949, Lindsay married Marian Bangerter in the Salt Lake Temple. During the early years of their marriage the Lindsays lived in Salt Lake City, Denver, Colorado and San Francisco. While living in Denver, Lindsay served as a counselor in a bishopric to Victor L. Brown. In 1959, Lindsay began a career with the government of the State of Utah. He served as Utah State Commissioner of Finance, with the Utah Juvenile Court System, as director of the Utah Council on Criminal Justice Administration and starting in 1979 as director of the Utah State Department of Human Services.

During the time he was a state legislator, Lindsay was the director of the University of Utah Bureau of Community Development and an adjunct professor at Brigham Young University. From 1978 to 1989 Lindsay served as managing director of Public Affairs for the LDS Church.

Among other church positions, Lindsay served as a bishop and stake president.

In 1989, Lindsay was called as a general authority and member of the Second Quorum of the Seventy. As a member of the Seventy, he served as the first president of the church's Africa Area.

After his release as a general authority in 1994, Lindsay was the LDS Church's representative in various anti-pornography initiatives. He was named the national education director of the Religious Alliance Against Pornography in 1995. He also worked on fighting alcohol abuse, for which he was honored by the American Council on Alcohol Problems in 1996.

== Personal life ==
Richard and Marian Lindsay (1928-2022) are the parents of six children and were named Utah's Parents of the Year in 2001. Their son, Bruce, was a lead news anchor at KSL TV, and their daughter, Susan, has been married since 1980 to Gerrit W. Gong, who became a member of the Quorum of the Twelve Apostles in 2018.

Lindsay died of cancer in Salt Lake City though he spent most of his life in Taylorsville, Utah.
