= KSL (AM) =

Simulcast of KSL-FM
- Salt Lake City, Utah; United States
- Broadcast area: Salt Lake City metropolitan area; Wasatch Front
- Frequency: 1160 kHz (HD Radio)
- Branding: KSL Newsradio 102.7 FM

Programming
- Format: News/Talk
- Affiliations: ABC News Radio; Westwood One; BYU Cougars; Real Salt Lake

Ownership
- Owner: Bonneville International; (Bonneville International Corporation)
- Sister stations: KSL-FM, KSL-TV, KRSP-FM, KSFI

History
- First air date: May 6, 1922; 104 years ago
- Former call signs: KZN (1922–1924); KFPT (1924–1925)
- Call sign meaning: Salt Lake

Technical information
- Licensing authority: FCC
- Facility ID: 6375
- Class: A
- Power: 50,000 watts unlimited
- Transmitter coordinates: 40°46′45.8″N 112°5′58.8″W (main); 40°46′50″N 112°6′2″W (auxiliary)

Links
- Public license information: Public file; LMS
- Webcast: Listen live (via Audacy)
- Website: kslnewsradio.com

KSL (1160 AM) is a commercial radio station licensed to Salt Lake City, Utah. KSL and sister station 102.7 KSL-FM simulcast a news-talk radio format. They are owned by Bonneville International, a wholly-owned broadcasting subsidiary of the Church of Jesus Christ of Latter-day Saints (LDS). The two stations, alongside co-owned television station KSL-TV, maintain studio facilities in the Broadcast House building at the Triad Center in downtown Salt Lake City.

KSL is a Class A clear-channel station, broadcasting with 50,000 watts non-directional, the maximum power permitted by the Federal Communications Commission. The signal covers most of north-central Utah in the daytime and can be heard in much of Western North America at night. The transmitter site is west of the Salt Lake City International Airport.

KSL is Utah's primary entry point for the Emergency Alert System. KSL transmissions broadcast in HD Radio.

== Programming ==
On weekdays, KSL-AM-FM air all-news blocks in morning and afternoon drive time. The rest of the schedule is talk shows and sports. Morning news is anchored by Amanda Dickson and Andy Farnsworth while Jeff Caplan anchors in afternoons. In late mornings, Greg Skordas and Holly Richardson host Inside Sources. Middays with Amanda Shilaos airs at noon. Evenings feature KSL at Night along with repeats of daytime shows.

Specialty shows are featured on weekends. Programs includes KSL Outdoors, The KSL Greenhouse Show, Cougar Sports Saturday, The Movie Show Matinee and Meet The Press. Several LDS religious shows are heard on Sunday mornings, including Music & the Spoken Word, airing on KSL continuously since 1929. Twice a year, KSL-AM-FM carries LDS General Conferences in April and October. Some weekend shows are paid brokered programming. KSL-AM-FM carries Brigham Young University Cougars sports and Real Salt Lake soccer games. The stations are affiliates of ABC News Radio.

== History ==
=== KZN ===
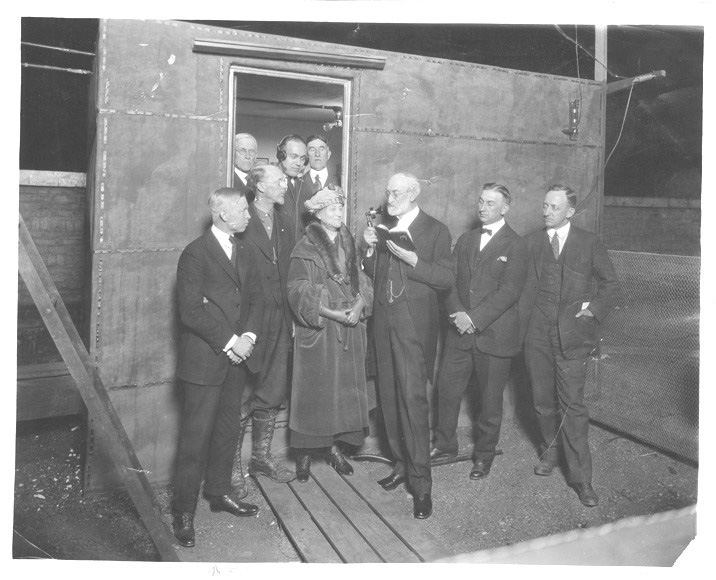
The May 6, 1922, debut broadcast (as KZN) included a dedication speech by LDS Church president Heber J. Grant.

Effective December 1, 1921, the U.S. Department of Commerce, in charge of radio at the time, adopted a regulation formally establishing a broadcasting station category, which set aside the wavelength of 360 meters (833 kHz) for entertainment broadcasts, and 485 meters (619 kHz) for farm market and weather reports.

On April 21, 1922, the Deseret News, a Salt Lake City newspaper owned by the Church of Jesus Christ of Latter-day Saints (LDS), was issued a license for a new station on both broadcasting wavelengths. This was the first broadcasting station licensed in the state of Utah. The new station's call sign was KZN. At this time call letters were generally randomly assigned from a roster of available call signs, but it is possible that the KZN call sign was derived from the Zion concept and common motif in the Latter Day Saint movement. The station was located on the roof of the Deseret News Building. KZN's first broadcast began at 3:00 p.m. on May 6, 1922, and included an 8:00 p.m. dedication address by LDS Church president Heber J. Grant, followed by a speech by Salt Lake City Mayor C. Clarence Nelson.

=== KFPT ===
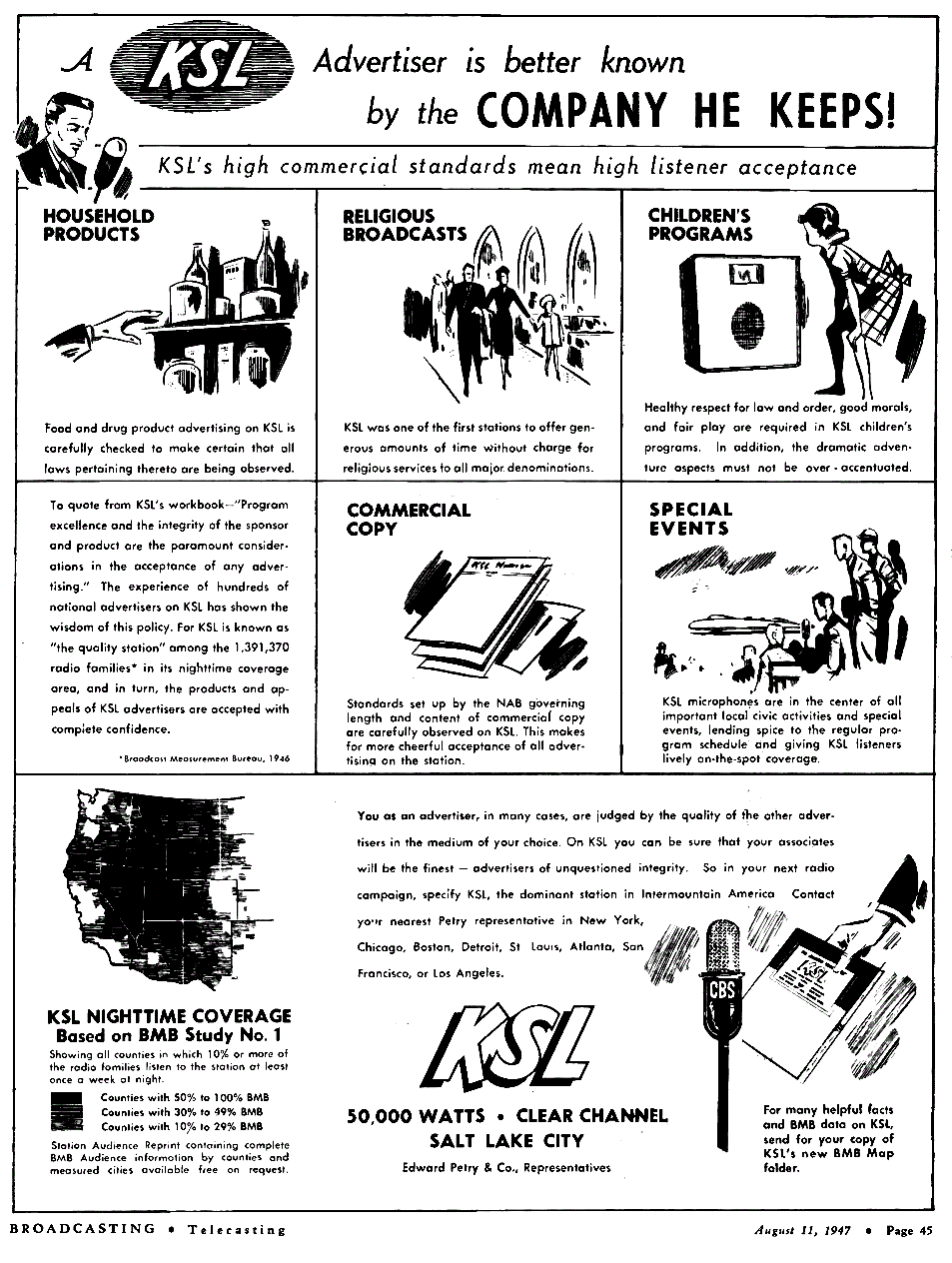
A 1947 advertisement, oriented toward potential sponsors, boasted that "KSL's high commercial standards mean high listener acceptance".

In 1924, KZN was sold to John Cope and his father, F.W. Cope, who formed the Radio Service Corporation of Utah. Ownership was changed to Cope & Johnson, and the station's frequency to 1120 kHz. The call letters became KFPT. This new call sign came from an alphabetical roster of available call letters that were normally assigned to new stations.

KFPT, still located atop the Deseret News Building, made its formal debut on June 13, 1924. In early 1925, ownership was changed to the Radio Service Corporation of Utah, and the station's frequency to 1150 kHz.

=== KSL ===
On March 24, 1925, the call letters were changed from KFPT to KSL, and the frequency to 1000 kHz, with the "S" and "L" standing for "Salt Lake". (The KSL call sign had been assigned to a San Francisco station from March 1922 until it was deleted in June 1923.) Earl J. Glade (later a four-term mayor of Salt Lake City) joined the station in 1925 and guided KSL's operations for the next fourteen years. John F. Fitzpatrick, publisher of The Salt Lake Tribune (owned by the Kearns Corporation) acquired a quarter interest of KSL for a modest price, as did the LDS Church. This was the Tribune's first business partnership with the LDS Church, though the Church later reacquired full interest in the station. In 1927, the station moved to 990 kHz.

The recently formed Federal Radio Commission adopted General Order 40 in 1928, which included 40 "clear channel" allocations, which were assignments providing for high-powered stations with extensive nighttime coverage. The resulting reallocation was implemented on November 11, 1928, with KSL given one of the "clear channel" assignments, on 1130 kHz. An upgrade from 5,000 to the current 50,000 watts was dedicated October 22, 1932. In March 1941, with the implementation of the North American Regional Broadcasting Agreement, KSL was shifted to 1160 kHz, although it maintained its status as a "clear channel" station. In 1932, KSL joined the CBS Radio Network. It remained with CBS until 2005, when it switched to ABC News Radio.

=== FM and TV stations ===
The top of the hour identification for KSL-FM and KSL-AM Salt Lake, shortly after 102.7 switched to the simulcast.

KSL-FM debuted in 1946 on the then sparsely populated FM band at 100.1 (later 100.3) MHz. This was a different station from the current-day KSL-FM. After simulcasting KSL for its first two decades, the FM station switched to beautiful music, quarter-hour sweeps of largely instrumental music with limited commercials and chatter. This was a contrast to KSL's format of news and talk along with middle of the road music. In 1977, KSL-FM was sold to Simmons Family Inc. This was due to FCC restrictions on multiple station ownership at the time. The new owners changed the call letters to KSFI. In 1982, KSL began broadcasting in AM stereo using the Kahn-Hazeltine system.

KSL gained a television counterpart in 1949, KSL-TV. (KSL-TV started as a CBS affiliate. It then switched to NBC in 1995, after former NBC affiliate KUTV came under the ownership of CBS.) The KSL stations remained subsidiaries of the Deseret News until 1964, when Bonneville International Corporation was formed as the parent company for the LDS Church's broadcasting interests.

=== Nitecap and Utah Jazz ===
A notable program from KSL's history was Herb Jepko's Nitecap call-in show. It aired overnight on KSL from 1964 to 1990. This was one of the first U.S. radio talk shows to be syndicated nationally, airing on numerous Mutual Broadcasting System Network stations. Jepko usually steered clear of politics and controversy, instead sharing friendly chit-chat with his callers.

KSL was the radio flagship station for Utah Jazz basketball games from the team's 1979 arrival through the 1985-1986 season. The Jazz are now heard on KZNS 1280 AM and KZNS-FM 97.5.

In the mid-1980s, many radio listeners were tuning to FM stations for music. Gradually KSL adopted an all-news and talk format. It completely dropped music programming, aside from its Sunday broadcasts of the Tabernacle Choir at Temple Square (Mormon Tabernacle Choir).

=== KSL-FM returns ===
Station ownership limitations were loosened in the early 2000s. Management saw that some radio listeners preferred the FM band and rarely tuned to AM stations. It decided KSL needed an FM partner.

In 2003, Bonneville purchased 15 radio stations from Simmons Media Group, including KSFI and KQMB (102.7 FM). In September 2005, KQMB was converted to a simulcast of KSL. To match its AM counterpart, KQMB changed its call letters to KSL-FM. The joint operation was branded as "KSL Newsradio 102.7 FM & 1160 AM". Initially the AM signal was considered to be the main station. In recent years, the FM dial position is the only frequency given, omitting 1160 AM.

== Personalities and long-running programs ==
=== Past personalities ===
- Parley Baer (1930s) Director of Special Events
- Herb Jepko (1960s), known for his Nitecaps show

KSL was the flagship station of Brigham Young University's football and men's basketball teams until BYU Radio took over the duties in 2017. KSL remains an affiliate for those teams. Commentary for football games is provided by Greg Wrubell, the "Voice of the Cougars".

Two long-running programs on KSL are Music & the Spoken Word and Religion Today. Music & the Spoken Word is a weekly broadcast of The Tabernacle Choir at Temple Square, which is also syndicated nationwide on radio and television. Continuously airing on KSL since 1929, it is one of the longest-running radio programs in the world. In addition, it is one of only two radio shows to be inaugurated into the National Association of Broadcasters' Hall of Fame, along with the Grand Ole Opry.

On Sunday mornings and evenings for more than two decades, the station has broadcast Religion Today with host Martin Tanner. The program focuses on Christian and Jewish history and doctrine.

== See also ==
- Bonneville International
- KSL-FM
- KSL-TV
- Media in Salt Lake City
- List of initial AM-band station grants in the United States
- List of three-letter broadcast call signs in the United States
