= Paul James (sportscaster) =

American sportscaster (1931–2018)

Paul Morris James (July 17, 1931 – October 6, 2018) was an American sportscaster. He was longtime play-by-play announcer on KSL 1160 AM radio broadcasts of football and basketball games involving the BYU Cougars from 1965 to 2000.

== Early life ==
James was born on July 17, 1931, in Ogden, Utah, where he was also raised. A childhood accident, in which he broke his two front teeth, made him introverted until high school. But James conquered his shyness to become the student body president during his senior year at Ogden High. James had a strong desire to compete in athletics, but his doctors prevented him from participating because of a heart murmur that developed after a serious illness. After high school, James attended the University of Utah on a Rotary Club scholarship.

== Broadcasting career ==
James got his start as a broadcaster, filling in on weekend sportscasts with KDYL-TV in Salt Lake City, Utah, in the 1950s.

He eventually started working for KDYL (AM) as well and he did play-by-play on University of Utah football and basketball games. When KDYL lost the rights to broadcast the Utes' games in 1965 to KALL, James took an offer from KSL to call BYU games instead. At the same time, he took over as sports director at KSL-TV, a post he held until 1991. For his entire tenure at KSL-TV, he was teamed with anchorman Dick Nourse and weatherman Bob Welti. The trio were the longest-running evening news team in the nation at the time James left channel 5 to focus solely on Cougar football and basketball.

James suffered a heart episode at Utah's Rice-Eccles Stadium just prior to the BYU-Utah football game at end the 1996 season. He completed broadcasting the game after signing a release for the paramedics. After the game he drove himself to the hospital, where he was admitted and had a 6 bypass heart surgery performed . He only missed one game—the first ever WAC championship game two weeks later—because of the heart surgery. James subsequently recovered and returned in six weeks, to call the 1997 Cotton Bowl Classic where BYU defeated Kansas State 19–15. He did miss occasional basketball games, when dates for football and basketball games conflicted, before switching to football only.

James ultimately chose to retire from being "the voice of the Cougars" after longtime BYU coach LaVell Edwards announced his retirement just before the 2000 college football season. Greg Wrubell, who had been sideline reporter for football games since 1992 and the main basketball announcer since 1996, succeeded him as radio play-by-play announcer.

In 2005, James was inducted in the BYU sports hall of fame.

He died on October 6, 2018, at the age of 87.

== Cougar Tales ==
James wrote a book Cougar Tales, published in 1984, which chronicled his experiences calling play-by-play for BYU football and basketball up to that point.
