= R. Bruce Lindsay =

R. Bruce Lindsay may refer to:

- Robert Bruce Lindsay, American physicist
- R(ichard) Bruce Lindsay (broadcaster) (born 1950), American broadcast journalist
