= Bonneville International =

Media company owned by the Latter-day Saints based in Salt Lake City

Bonneville International Corporation
- Type: Subsidiary
- Industry: Radio broadcasting; Television broadcasting
- Founded: September 4, 1964; 62 years ago
- Headquarters: Salt Lake City, Utah, U.S.
- Parent: Deseret Management Corporation
- Website: bonneville.com

Bonneville International Corporation is a media and broadcasting company, wholly owned by the Church of Jesus Christ of Latter-day Saints (LDS Church) through its for-profit arm, Deseret Management Corporation. It began as a radio and TV network in the Triad Center Broadcast House in Salt Lake City, Utah. Bonneville's name alludes to Benjamin Bonneville and the prehistoric Lake Bonneville that once covered much of modern-day Utah, which was named after him.

Bonneville owns 13 radio stations in four major markets as well as one television station in its home market; it also manages eight additional radio stations in two markets under a local marketing agreement. Additionally, its Bonneville Communications division provides marketing and communications strategy and branding services. Bonneville Distribution, another division, provides broadcast syndication and distribution services to non-profit organizations.

== History ==
Bonneville International was formed on September 4, 1964, with the approval of the LDS Church's First Presidency. It was formed to merge its TV and radio properties, including KSL-AM-FM-TV in its hometown of Salt Lake City, as well as KIRO-AM-FM-TV in Seattle, which had previously been subsidiaries of the Deseret News. The LDS Church divested itself of the Seattle stations between 1995 and 1997, but reacquired KIRO-AM 10 years later. The company has also owned stations in New York City, Dallas, Kansas City, and Los Angeles at one point.

In 1980 it formed Bonneville Communications Corporation, primarily to broadcast LDS General Conference.

Bonneville prided itself on "values-oriented programming" and community involvement, in line with the company's mission as set forth by its first president and founder, Arch L. Madsen. According to Bonneville International's website, their values reflect an understanding that "families are the basic unit of society... and that strong families build strong communities."

Due to a Federal Communications Commission (FCC) media cross-ownership rule, Bonneville was unable to purchase additional media outlets in Salt Lake City beyond its flagship cluster. In anticipation of a rule change, Bonneville purchased four additional Salt Lake radio stations in 2002. The FCC did not grant approval for this purchase until 2003, upon which the stations were acquired by Bonneville. The status of this deal is still uncertain—the FCC has only granted a waiver to Bonneville, and a recent court ruling has put the FCC cross-ownership rule changes into question.

On October 4, 2004, Bonneville International announced plans to buy three stations from Emmis Communications in the Phoenix, Arizona market, in exchange for WLUP "The Loop" in Chicago and cash.

On January 4, 2006, Bonneville and The Washington Post announced that the frequencies currently used by WTOP, 1500 kHz AM and 107.7 MHz FM, would be reassigned to a new station, "Washington Post Radio." WTOP would move to 103.5 MHz, the frequencies currently used by classical music station WGMS, which in turn would move to 104.1 and 103.9 MHz, the frequencies used by WWZZ, which would be closed.

WGMS itself would fall silent a little more than a year later, on January 22, 2007. In its place is 1970s-1980s-adult-hits-station WXGG ("George 104"). Simultaneously, public radio station WETA-FM dropped its news/talk format in order to revive its previous classical format, via a partnership with Bonneville. WETA would also receive WGMS' entire music library, hired WGMS' last program director, and also retained the usage of the WGMS call sign. George 104 would last less than four months, when in April 2007, it was announced that the 104.1 frequency would be LMA'd to Radio One. On April 7, 2007, the frequency would flip to a Gospel and Inspiration format, known as Praise 104.1.

The Washington Post Radio experiment ended in September 2007, as the three stations (including the powerful AM 1500 signal) became WWWT, or "3WT". Hosts include syndicated hosts from the Right (Bill O'Reilly, Glenn Beck, Neal Boortz) and Left (Stephanie Miller) as well as Washington Nationals baseball. The station's morning show will continue.

Rush Limbaugh once worked for Bonneville Communications, after his stint with the Kansas City Royals.

CBS Radio has announced that it would sell 50 radio stations in 12 markets to focus on major market stations. As of September 22, 2008, Bonneville is one of the seven candidates to make first-round bids.

On August 12, 2009; Citadel Broadcasting has rumored that they're planning to sell the former Disney/ABC's 23 stations to reduce its debt load, however several financial factors may put the deal at risk. While not all the stations can be sold off, Bonneville has expressed interest in 2 FM stations in Washington D.C. (WJZW and WRQX).

On January 19, 2011, Bonneville announced it would sell 17 radio stations in Cincinnati, Chicago, Washington, D.C., and St. Louis to Hubbard Broadcasting for $505 million. The deal closed May 2, 2011.

On November 17, 2017, Bonneville began operating four San Francisco radio stations and four Sacramento radio stations under a local marketing agreement on behalf of the Entercom Divestiture Trust, following Entercom's merger with CBS Radio. On August 3, 2018, Bonneville acquired the stations outright for $141 million; the deal had been delayed by succession issues related to the death of LDS Church president Thomas S. Monson the preceding January.

On September 30, 2021, it was announced that Bonneville International, owner of the KSL (AM) and KSL-FM, would be taking over operations of The Zone sports network. The arrangement with Bonneville will result in select Utah Jazz games being aired on KSL. Founding host Gordon Monson and some producers were laid off by the new management. The Zone introduced a new lineup effective October 20.

In October 2025, the company sold its cluster of radio stations in San Francisco to Connoisseur Media.

== Bonneville-owned stations ==
Stations are arranged in alphabetical order by state and city of license.

Note: Two boldface asterisks appearing following a station's call letters (**) indicates a station that was built and signed-on by a predecessor of Bonneville International.

=== Television station ===
Media market	State	Station	Purchased	Affiliation
Salt Lake City	Utah	KSL-TV **	1949	NBC

=== Radio stations ===
Media market	State	Station	Purchased	Current format	Notes
Phoenix	Arizona	KTAR	2004	Sports talk (ESPN Radio)	
Phoenix	Arizona	KTAR-FM	2006	News/Talk	
Phoenix	Arizona	KMVP-FM	2004	Sports talk	
Sacramento	California	KHTK	2018	Sports talk	
Sacramento	California	KYMX	2018	Adult contemporary	
Sacramento	California	KZZO	2018	Hot adult contemporary	
Sacramento	California	KNCI	2018	Country music	
Denver	Colorado	KEPN	2015	Sports talk	
Denver	Colorado	KKFN	2015	Sports talk	
Denver	Colorado	KOSI	2015	Adult contemporary	
Denver	Colorado	KYGO-FM	2015	Country music	
Salt Lake City	Utah	KSL **	1922	News/Talk	(Note: Simulcasts KSL-FM.)
Salt Lake City	Utah	KSL-FM	2003	News/Talk	
Salt Lake City	Utah	KZNS	2021	Sports (The Zone)	
Salt Lake City	Utah	KZNS-FM	2021	Sports (The Zone)	(Note: Simulcasts KZNS-AM.)
Salt Lake City	Utah	KSFI	2003	Soft adult contemporary	(Note: Previously owned from 1947–1977.)
Salt Lake City	Utah	KRSP-FM	2003	Classic rock	
Seattle–Tacoma	Washington	KTTH	2008	Conservative talk	(Note: Previously owned from 1995–1997.)
Seattle–Tacoma	Washington	KIRO	2008	Sports radio (ESPN Radio)	(Note: Previously owned from 1964–1997.)
Seattle–Tacoma	Washington	KIRO-FM	2008	News/Talk	

On September 30, 2021, Bonneville International, owner of KSL and KSL-TV, began operating KZNS/KZNS-FM "The Zone" in Salt Lake City under a local marketing agreement with Jazz Communications LLC, through the sports division of KSL News Radio. The operating agreement will allow select Utah Jazz games to be simulcast on KSL-AM 1160 and KSL-FM 102.7. Gordon Monson and Austin Horton were among the long time employees of The Zone who were dismissed as a result of KSL Sports assuming operations of KZNS. Although KSL Sports is responsible for overseeing daily operations of KZNS, Ryan Smith dba Jazz Communications LLC retains ownership of both 1280 AM and 97.5 FM according to the FCC database. The Zone's website at 1280thezone.com is now a dead link. The stations can now be streamed at kslsports.com/thezone/. In June 2022, The Zone officially moved its operations from Vivint Arena to newly built studios and office space in the Triad Center, joining the other radio stations (KSL (radio network), KSFI, KRSP-FM) and KSL-TV, as well as Deseret News, a print newspaper owned by the parent company of Bonneville International. KSL News Radio, KSL-TV, KSL.com, and Deseret News share a consolidated newsroom.

== Former Bonneville-owned stations ==
=== Television stations ===
Media market	State	Station	Purchased	Sold
Cedar City–St. George	Utah	KCSG	1998	2002
Seattle–Tacoma	Washington	KIRO-TV	1964	1995

From 2010 - 2016, Bonneville International also operated an independent TV station, KJZZ-TV (channel 14), in Salt Lake City, under a local marketing agreement with Larry H. Miller Communications Corporation. The arrangement ended when Sinclair Broadcast Group acquired KJZZ-TV.

=== Former radio stations ===
Media market	State/Dist.	Station	Purchased	Sold	Notes
Phoenix	Arizona	KIDR	1991	1997	(Note: Known as KMEO prior to 1992.)
Phoenix	Arizona	KMVP	2004	2017	
Phoenix	Arizona	KHTC	1991	1997	(Note: Known as KPSN prior to 1994 and KCHT prior to 1995.)
San Francisco	California	KOIT-AM	1982	2008	(Note: Known as KXLR from 1986 to 1987 and KSFB from 2007 onward.)
San Francisco	California	KBWF	1997	2008	(Note: Known as KPIX-FM prior to 1997, KOYT from 1997, KZQZ from 1997 to 2002, KKDV from 2002 to 2003, KZBR 2003 to 2006, and KMAX-FM from 2006 to 2007.)
San Francisco	California	KDFC	1997	2008	
San Francisco	California	KOIT-FM	2018	2026	(Note: Previously owned from 1975–2008.)
San Francisco	California	KUFX	2018	2026	
San Francisco	California	KMVQ-FM	2018	2026	
San Francisco	California	KBLX-FM	2018	2026	
Los Angeles	California	KBRT	1969	1980	(Note: Known as KBIG prior to 1979.)
Los Angeles	California	KBIG	1969	1998	(Note: Known as KXTZ from 1971 to 1974.)
Los Angeles	California	KZLA	1998	2000	
Los Angeles	California	KSWD	2008	2015	
Washington, D.C.	District of Columbia	WBQH	2004	2011	(Note: Known as WFED prior to 2008, WTOP from 2008 to 2009 and 2010, and WZAA from 2009 to 2010.)
Washington, D.C.	District of Columbia	WFED	1998	2011	(Note: Known as WTOP prior to 2006, WTWP from 2006 to 2007, and WWWT from 2007 to 2008.)
Washington, D.C.	District of Columbia	WWFD	1996	2011	(Note: Simulcasts WFED.) (Note: Known as WXTR prior to 2006, WTOP from 2006 to 2007, WTWT from 2007, and WWWB from 2007 to 2008.)
Washington, D.C.	District of Columbia	WTOP-FM	1998	2011	(Note: Known as WGMS-FM prior to 2006.)
Washington, D.C.	District of Columbia	WTLP	1996	2011	(Note: Simulcasts WTOP-FM.) (Note: Known as WWVZ prior to 2006 and WGYS from 2006 to 2007.)
Washington, D.C.	District of Columbia	WWWT-FM	1998	2011	(Note: Known as WTOP-FM prior to 2006 and WTWP-FM from 2006 to 2007.)
Washington, D.C.	District of Columbia	WPRS-FM	1996	2008	(Note: Known as WWZZ prior to 2006 and WGMS from 2006 to 2007, and WXGG from 2007.)
Idaho Falls–Pocatello	Idaho	KSLJ	2003	2006	(Note: Known as KZNR prior to 2004.)
Idaho Falls–Pocatello	Idaho	KSSL	2003	2006	(Note: Known as KZNI prior to 2004.)
Idaho Falls–Pocatello	Idaho	KBLI	2003	2006	
Idaho Falls–Pocatello	Idaho	KLCE	2003	2006	
Idaho Falls–Pocatello	Idaho	KCVI	2003	2006	
Idaho Falls–Pocatello	Idaho	KFTZ	2003	2006	
Idaho Falls–Pocatello	Idaho	KTHK	2003	2006	(Note: Known as KPLV prior to 2004.)
Chicago	Illinois	WDRV	2000	2011	(Note: Known as WNIB prior to 2001.)
Chicago	Illinois	WWDV	2000	2011	(Note: Simulcasts WDRV.) (Note: Known as WNIZ-FM prior to 2001.)
Chicago	Illinois	WLUP-FM	1997	2005	
Chicago	Illinois	WILV	1997	2011	(Note: Known as WNND prior to 2004.)
Chicago	Illinois	WTMX	1970	2011	(Note: Known as WCLR prior to 1989.)
Kansas City	Missouri	KCMO	1993	1997	
Kansas City	Missouri	KMBZ	1967	1997	
Kansas City	Missouri	KCMO-FM	1993	1997	
Kansas City	Missouri	KLTH	1967	1997	(Note: Known as KMBR prior to 1991.)
St. Louis	Missouri	WIL	2000	2008	(Note: Known as WRTH prior to 2005.)
St. Louis	Missouri	WARH	2000	2011	(Note: Known as WSSM prior to 2005.)
St. Louis	Missouri	WIL-FM	2000	2011	
St. Louis	Missouri	WXOS	2000	2011	(Note: Known as WVRV prior to 2006 and WMVN from 2006 to 2008.)
New York City	New York	WNSR	1967	1997	(Note: Known as WRFM prior to 1986, WMXV from 1992 to 1996, and WDBZ from 1996 to 1997.)
Cincinnati	Ohio	WKRQ	2008	2011	
Cincinnati	Ohio	WREW	2008	2011	(Note: Known as WYGY prior to 2009, and WSWD from 2009.)
Cincinnati	Ohio	WUBE-FM	2008	2011	
Cincinnati	Ohio	WYGY	2008	2011	(Note: Known as WSWD prior to 2009.)
Dallas–Fort Worth	Texas	KAAM	1978	1994	
Dallas–Fort Worth	Texas	KZPS	1978	1997	(Note: Known as KAFM prior to 1986.)
Dallas–Fort Worth	Texas	KDGE	1995	1997	
Houston	Texas	KLDE	1997	1998	
Salt Lake City	Utah	KUTR **	2005	2008	
St. George	Utah	KDXU	2003	2006	
St. George	Utah	KUNF	2003	2006	
St. George	Utah	KREC	2003	2006	
St. George	Utah	KSNN	2003	2006	
Seattle–Tacoma	Washington	KNWX	1995		
Seattle–Tacoma	Washington	KIRO-FM	1964	1997	(Note: Known as KSEA from 1975 to 1991 and KWMX from 1991 to 1992.)

== See also ==
- Media in Salt Lake City
