= Dick Nourse =

American television news anchor (1940–2023)

- Born: March 8, 1940; Grand Junction, Colorado, U.S.
- Died: May 18, 2023 (aged 83); St. George, Utah, U.S.
- Occupation: Journalist
- Years active: 1964–2007
- Notable credit: News Anchor at KSL 5 (1964–2007)
- Spouses: Jan Tolman (m. 1981; died 1997): Debi Nourse
- Children: 5 (1 deceased)

Dick Nourse (March 8, 1940 – May 18, 2023) was an American television news anchor in Salt Lake City, Utah. He most recently worked for KSL 5 Television. Nourse joined the KSL news team in 1964 as the station's weekend anchor/reporter. Six months later, he was named the station's weekday anchor. He concluded his 43-year career with his final newscast on November 28, 2007, a record term for a Utah television news anchor. Nourse's longevity as an American news anchor comes second to that of the late Hal Fishman, whose career spanned 47 years.

Nourse began his broadcasting career in Grand Junction, Colorado, at radio stations KDTA and KREX. He attended Mesa College in Grand Junction and Brigham Young University in Provo, Utah. Nourse moved to Salt Lake City in 1964 and applied at KUTV channel 2 and KCPX channel 4, but neither hired him. The next day, he applied across the street at KSL channel 5 and was hired.

== Nourse, Welti, and James ==
The birth of KSL's franchise product was on the evening of July 13, 1965. On that day, Nourse was first paired with weatherman Bob Welti and sportscaster Paul James, recently poached from KCPX-TV, which had long been the leading news station in Utah. Despite its newspaper roots, KSL-TV had long been a ratings also-ran. However, within a short time, Nourse, Welti, and James catapulted channel 5 to first place—a lead it held for over four decades. The trio would remain together for 26 years until James and Welti both retired in 1991. At that time, they were the longest-running evening news team in the nation.

=== Cancer ===
In 1980, Nourse learned he had Non-Hodgkin lymphoma, a form of cancer. He was off-the-air and in the hospital for chemotherapy treatment. His co-anchor at the time, Shelly Thomas, interviewed him and his doctor. His doctors were unsure of his chances at survival, but Nourse survived cancer twice (he was diagnosed with prostate cancer in 1996) and was later involved in fundraising for cancer research.

However, Nourse was diagnosed with throat cancer in late 2012; in an interview with competing station KUTV, he said that it had gone into remission by early 2013.

== Career highlights ==
- In 1967, Nourse toured Vietnam for one month interviewing military personnel from Utah. In 1997 – 30 years later — he returned to renew acquaintances in that country and attempt to resolve some of his own unrest since the war.
- In 1977, he was listed as one of America's Outstanding Young Men.
- Has served such organizations as the Society of Professional Journalists; Camp Kostopulos and the United Cerebral Palsy Foundation.
- Has been honorary chairman of the Muscular Dystrophy Association and the American Cancer Society.
- In 1989, was honored by U.S. President Ronald Reagan as an outstanding survivor of cancer.
- Founded the Dick Nourse Center for Media Innovation at Dixie State College of Utah

== Retirement ==
On November 28, 2007, Nourse signed off the air for the final time. After a career that began at KSL in 1964, Nourse passed the reins to his long-time colleague and former co-anchor, Bruce Lindsay.

== Personal life and death ==
Nourse, along with his second wife, Debi, was the father of five children. With his first wife, Jan (1957–1997), he had a daughter (March 22, 1985 – April 15, 2007).

Nourse died on May 18, 2023, at the age of 83.

== Past news team members ==
- Nadine Wimmer, Kevin Eubank, Tom Kirkland (2006–2007) Eyewitness News|HD at 10
- Nadine Wimmer, Mark Eubank, Tom Kirkland (2002–2006) Eyewitness News at 10
- Ruth Todd, Mark Eubank, Tom Kirkland (1998–2001) Eyewitness News at 10
- Ruth Todd, Mark Eubank, Craig Bolerjack (1994–1998) Eyewitness News at 10
- Carole Mikita, Mark Eubank, Craig Bolerjack (1991–1994) Eyewitness News at 10
- Shelly Thomas, Bob Welti, Paul James (1979–1991) Eyewitness News Tonight at 10
- Bruce Lindsay, Bob Welti, Paul James (1979–1991) Eyewitness News at 6 & 10
- Bob Welti, Paul James (1965–1991)

Preceded by Ray Townsend	KSL Television 10pm Male Anchor; 1965–2007	Succeeded by Bruce Lindsay
