= Recreation Center for the Utah State Hospital =

- U.S. National Register of Historic Places
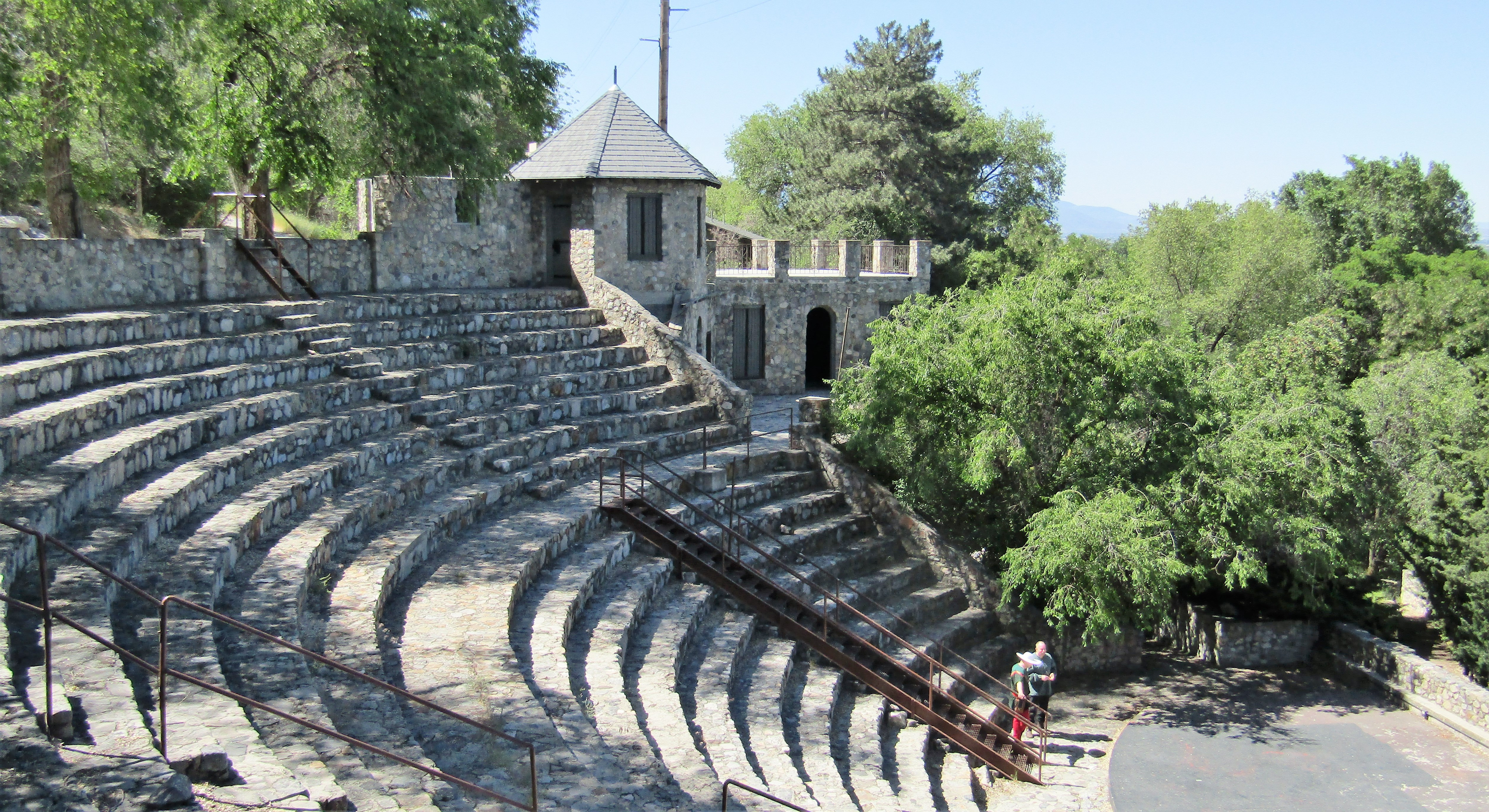
- Recreation Center for the Utah State Hospital, June 2018

- Location within Utah Location within the United States
- Location: 1300 East Center Street; Provo, Utah; United States
- Coordinates: 40°14′1″N 111°37′50″W
- Area: 1.6 acres (0.65 ha) (within 309.55 acre property of the Utah State Hospital)
- Built: 1936–7
- Built by: Works Progress Administration
- MPS: Public Works Buildings TR
- NRHP reference No.: 86000746
- Added to NRHP: April 9, 1986

The Recreation Center For the Utah State Hospital is a historic amphitheater in eastern Provo, Utah, United States, that is listed on the National Register of Historic Places.

== Description ==
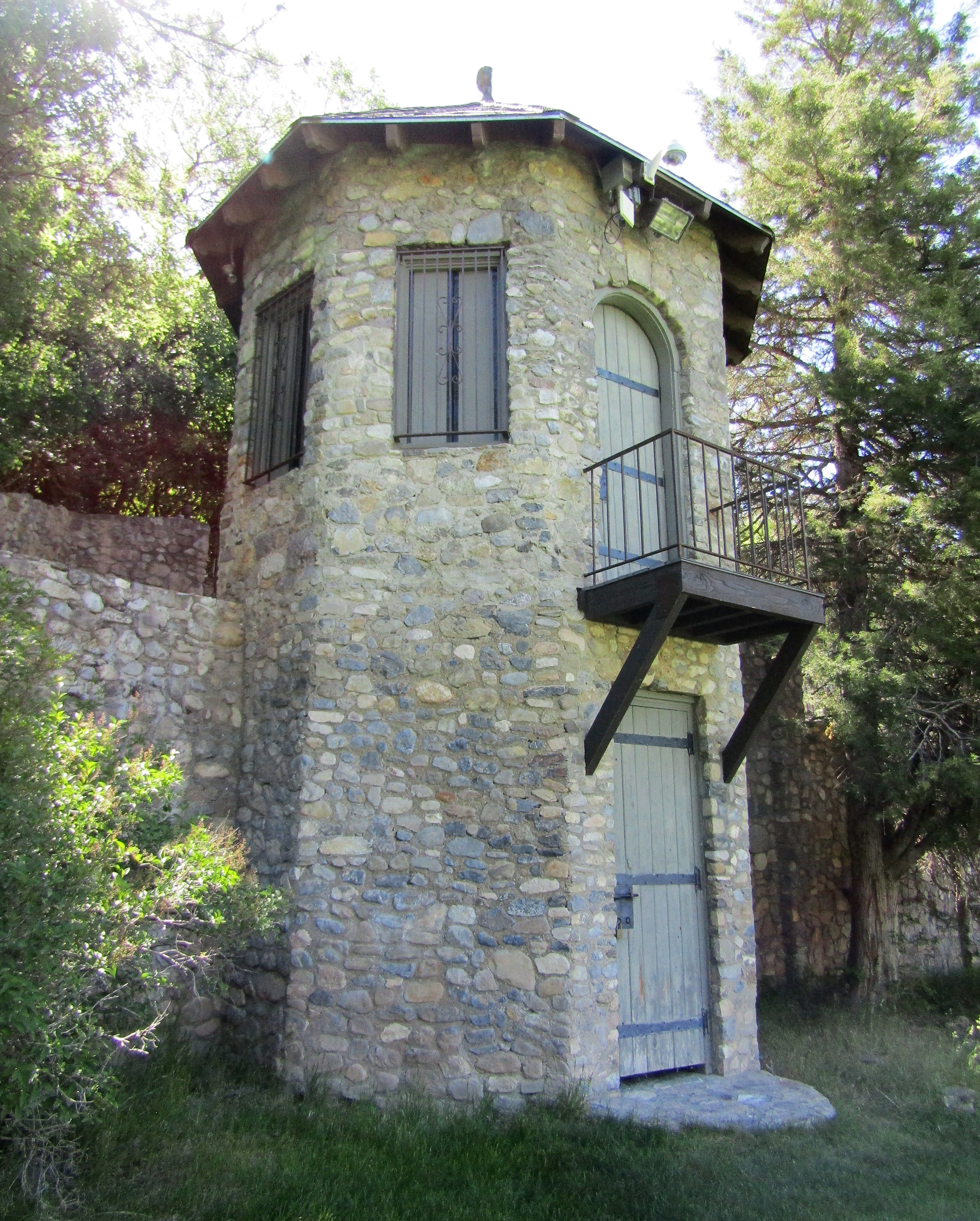
The amphitheater's castle tower, June 2018

The facility is located at 1300 East Center Street on the grounds of the Utah State Hospital (a mental hospital operated by the Utah Department of Human Services). It is believed to be one of the first and largest amphitheaters built in the state.

The recreation center covers three acres, seating 800 within its amphitheater and attached interior rooms. The amphitheater itself is set against the hillside next to the hospital. "It is constructed almost entirely of stone, as are the attached rooms and two-story towers at the southeast and northwest corners. The towers and the “battlements” of various sections of railing give the structure a castle-like appearance. Attached to the tower at the southeast corner is a large interior room with a fireplace, and above, on its flat roof, is another fireplace and an open-air area for social gatherings. Stone ramps at both the north and south sides provide access to the amphitheater from the grass play area at the base of the facility (Historic Preservation Research Office p. 2).”

The man responsible for drawing up the plans and supervising the work on site is Lavar S. Morris. Despite plans to eventually build additional recreational facilities on site, such as tennis courts, a handball court, and picturesque gardens, the recreation center remains the only recreational facility near the hospital.

For nearly three decades (1971-1997) the facility was the site of the annual Haunted Castle during the Halloween season. It was listed on the National Register of Historic Places April 9, 1986.

== Historical significance ==
During the time of the great depression, the State of Utah was hit hard economically; harder than most of the states. The state had an unemployment rate of 36 percent in 1933, which was the fourth highest in the country. The unemployment rate averaged 25 percent over eight years, between 1932 and 1940. Due to this crisis, and the fact that Utah was worse off than other states, Utah received more federal assistance than many other states. Per capita federal spending in Utah in the 1930s was 9th highest among the 48 states.

Many public buildings were built with the funds now provided by the national government. This recreation center is historically significant because it represents and helps document the impact of New Deal programs enforced by the federal government during this time of crisis. The structure was built in 1936–37.

== See also ==
- National Register of Historic Places listings in Utah County, Utah
- Utah State Training School Amphitheater and Wall in American Fork, also WPA-built and NRHP-listed
