= Greg Wrubell =

Canadian-American sports broadcaster

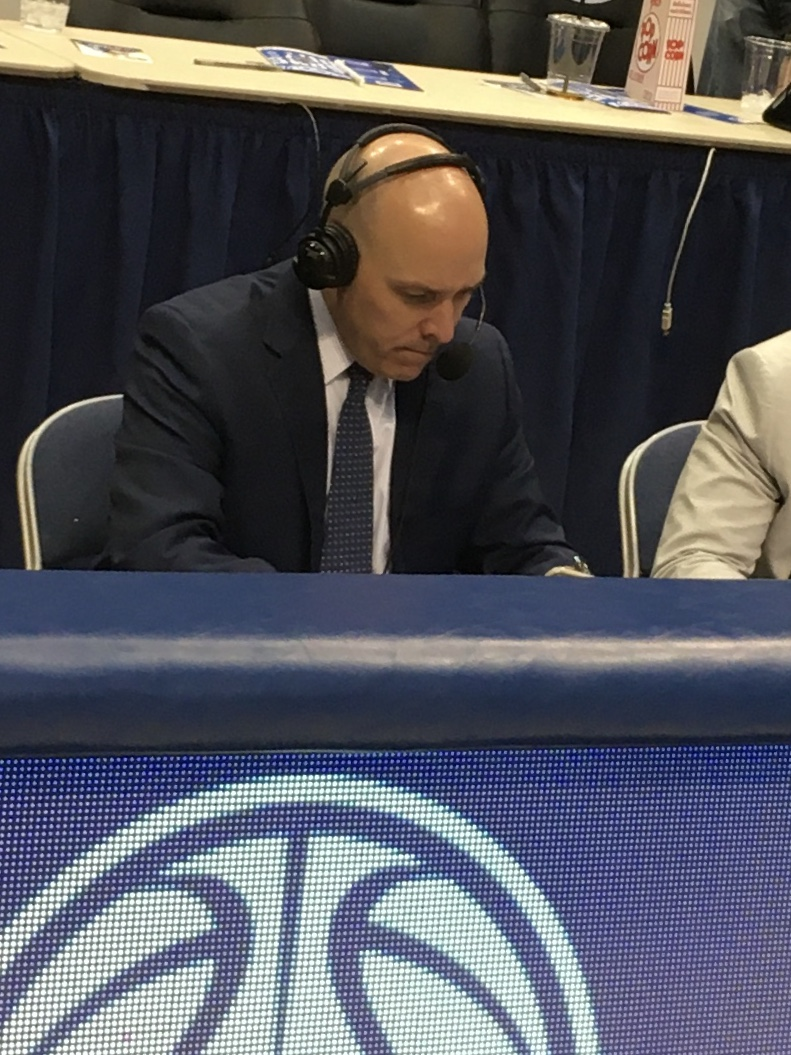
- Greg Wrubell during postgame broadcast December 2019
- Born: 1966 or 1967 (age 58–59); Saskatoon, Saskatchewan, Canada
- Education: BYU, B.A. Communications, 1990
- Occupation: Sports Broadcaster
- Employer: BYU Athletics
- Known for: Play-by-play voice for BYU Football, Basketball, Baseball, and Women's Soccer
- Spouse: Tauna
- Children: Jocelyn, Caitlan, Regan and Afton

Greg Wrubell is a sports broadcaster based out of Cedar Hills, Utah. He is a commentator for college sports, including football, men's basketball, baseball, and women's soccer for Brigham Young University's (BYU) Sports Network and was the television voice for Utah Royals FC matches on KMYU their first season. He is also the Director of Broadcast Media at BYU.

== Early life ==
Wrubell was born and raised in Saskatoon, Saskatchewan, where he developed an early love for hockey. He excelled at education and was allowed to skip first grade. He attended high school at Lord Beaverbrook High School. Despite his love of sports, Wrubell found he was not a very good player. Instead he attended choir, drama, and public speaking competitions.

Wrubell's father, Allan, sparked his interest in sports. Allan was the local public address announcer for the Saskatoon Blades. As a result Greg decided to pursue sports broadcasting in college. Greg applied to many schools and eventually chose BYU. At seventeen years old, Greg's first exposure to BYU sports was the 1984 season opener against Pitt, which he watched with his classmates from the Marriott Center. That same week he was hired at KBYU, where his first job as a broadcaster was covering the fencing team.

== Broadcasting career ==
After serving two years as a missionary of the Church of Jesus Christ of Latter-day Saints in Brazil, Wrubell returned to BYU in 1987 and met his future wife, Tauna Fehrner, and began an internship at KSL. At the end of the summer, the two married and Wrubell parlayed his internship into weekend work where he became co-host of the KSL weekend sports talk show with Chris Tunis. Wrubell would remain at BYU until 1990 when he graduated with a degree in communications.

In 1992, Paul James invited Wrubell to join the BYU Cougars football radio team. Wrubell served as the sideline reporter for football and men's basketball. A heart attack led to James missing a few basketball games during the 1996-97 season, allowing Wrubell to move from the sidelines to play-by-play. Wrubell would become the full-time play-by-play voice for men's basketball during the 1997-98 season and then for football in 2001.

Wrubell gained nationwide exposure when he made the only national radio commentary of the 2014 Miami Beach Bowl, including the infamous brawl between BYU and Memphis. He followed that up by being featured nationally on ESPN's SportsCenter and IMG College's best of the week during weeks one and two of the 2015 BYU Cougars football season, following Tanner Mangum's hail-mary victories over Nebraska and Boise State.

In 2016, Wrubell left KSL where he had been a producer, reporter, host, and announcer and became the BYU Director of Broadcast Media. In 2018, Wrubell was hired as the first television broadcaster for Utah Royals FC.

== Personal life ==
Greg and Tauna Wrubell live in Cedar Hills, Utah and are the parents of four children. One of their children, Regan, has autism, so Wrubell has participated in many autism-related benefit events. Wrubell testified before the Utah Legislature for autism funding and solicited corporate sponsors to donate to autism-related causes. He has also acted as emcee for benefit auctions for those with autism and at a few BYU award shows.
