= KSL-TV =

Television station in Salt Lake City

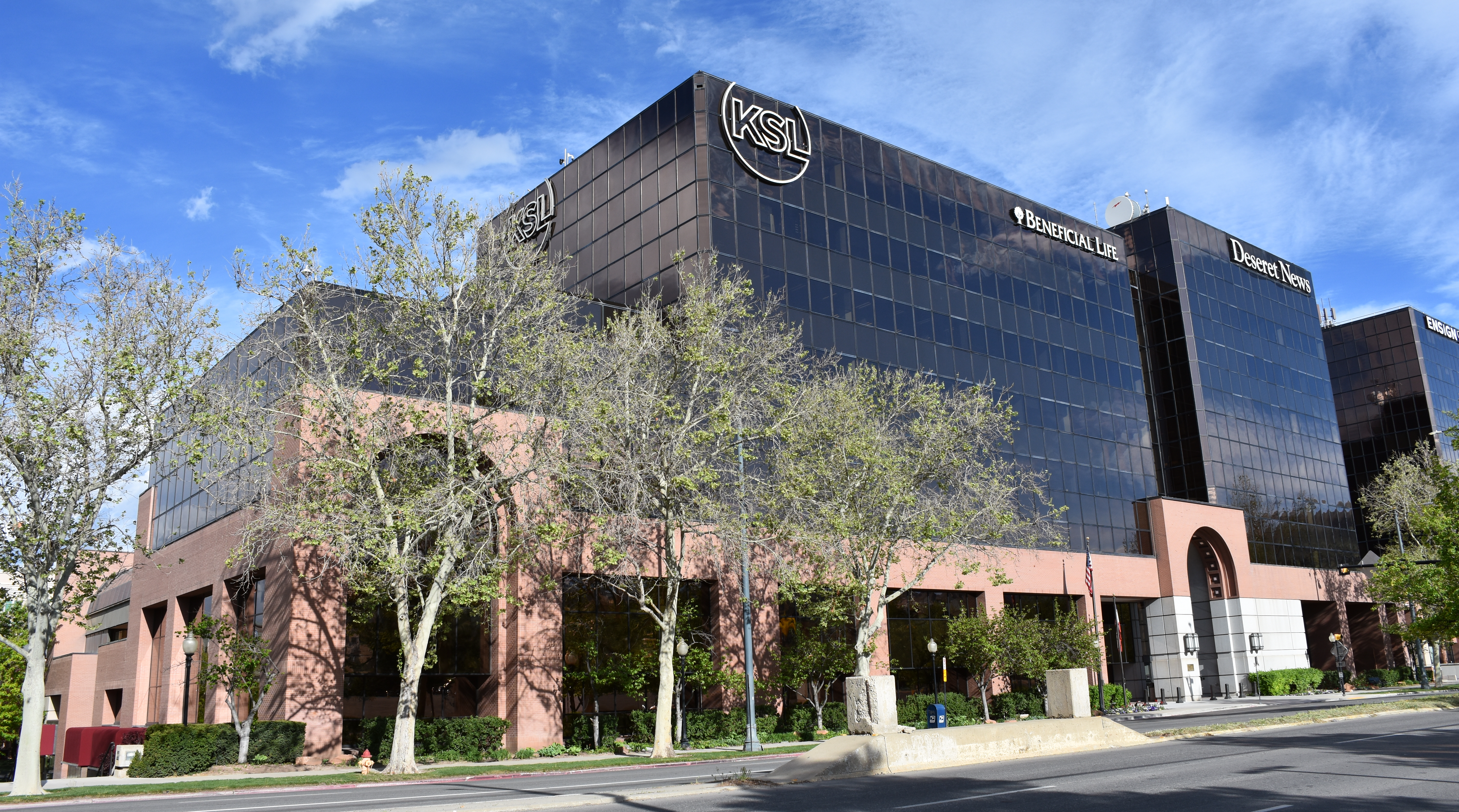
- KSL Broadcast House at the Triad Center in downtown Salt Lake City.
- Salt Lake City, Utah; United States
- Channels: Digital: 23 (UHF); Virtual: 5
- Branding: KSL 5; KSL News

Programming
- Affiliations: 5.1: NBC; for others, see § Subchannels

Ownership
- Owner: Bonneville International Corporation
- Sister stations: TV: KBYU-TV; Radio: KRSP-FM, KSFI, KSL, KSL-FM

History
- First air date: June 1, 1949
- Former channel numbers: Analog: 5 (VHF, 1949–2009); Digital: 38 (UHF, 1999–2018)
- Former affiliations: CBS (1949–1995); ABC (secondary, 1949–1954); DuMont (secondary, 1949–1955)
- Call sign meaning: Salt Lake

Technical information
- Licensing authority: FCC
- Facility ID: 6359
- ERP: 398 kW
- HAAT: 1,267 m (4,157 ft)
- Transmitter coordinates: 40°39′33″N 112°12′10″W
- Translator(s): see § Translators

Links
- Public license information: Public file; LMS
- Website: ksltv.com

KSL-TV (channel 5) is a television station in Salt Lake City, Utah, United States, affiliated with NBC. It is the sole television property of locally based Bonneville International, the for-profit broadcasting arm of the Church of Jesus Christ of Latter-day Saints (LDS Church), and is sister to radio stations KSL (1160 AM) and KSL-FM (102.7). The three stations share studios at the Broadcast House building in Salt Lake City's Triad Center; KSL-TV's transmitter is located on Farnsworth Peak in the Oquirrh Mountains, southwest of Salt Lake City. The station has a large network of broadcast translators that extend its over-the-air coverage throughout Utah, as well as portions of Arizona, Idaho, Nevada and Wyoming.

KSL-TV is one of a few for-profit U.S. television stations owned by a religious institution (most U.S. TV stations owned by religious institutions are affiliated with non-profit religious broadcasting networks).

== History ==
=== Primary CBS affiliate ===
Radio Service Corporation of Utah, owner of KSL (1160 AM), filed an application for a construction permit on May 26, 1948, and was granted it on July 29. Television in Salt Lake City was first conducted by KSL in 1946.

The station first signed on the air on June 1, 1949, operating from studios in the Union Pacific Building on Main Street. It was owned by the Deseret News, who also owned KSL radio (1160 AM and 100.3 FM, now KSFI). It originally operated as a CBS affiliate, owing to its sister radio station's longtime affiliation with the CBS Radio Network. In addition to its primary CBS affiliation, the station also shared ABC programming with NBC affiliate KDYL-TV (channel 4, now KTVX). The two stations continued to share ABC programming until KUTV (channel 2) signed on in September 1954 as the market's full-time ABC affiliate. The station also broadcast some programming from the DuMont Television Network, and during the late 1950s, the station was also briefly affiliated with the NTA Film Network.

A few months after its sign-on, KSL moved its operations to studio facilities at the Broadcast House on Social Hall Avenue. In 1952, a 370-foot (110 m) transmission tower was constructed on Farnsworth Peak to improve the station's signal coverage along the Wasatch Front and into Tooele County. It also began building a massive translator network that eventually stretched across five states.

When KSL first began broadcasting, all programs were produced locally or recorded content from out of the area (such as delayed kinescope recordings). This changed in 1951, when AT&T completed their coast-to-coast microwave relay network allowing the station to tap into live television feeds from its affiliated networks. KSL first broadcast live network programming on September 30, 1951, with a broadcast of ABC's Paul Whiteman's Goodyear Revue. Prior to this, KSL had been producing 40 live shows weekly.

The KSL stations operated as a division of the Deseret News until 1964, when Bonneville International was formed as the parent company for the Church of Jesus Christ of Latter-day Saints (LDS Church)'s broadcasting holdings. Soon afterward, channel 5 began broadcasting its programming in color. In 1984, the station moved to its current facility at Triad Center, also named Broadcast House.

=== Switch to NBC affiliate ===
In July 1994, CBS and Westinghouse Broadcasting (Group W) agreed to a long-term affiliation deal for the five Group W television stations, including longtime NBC affiliate KYW-TV in Philadelphia. That November, NBC agreed to trade their stations KCNC-TV and KUTV (which was acquired by NBC earlier that year) to CBS in return for CBS's former station in Philadelphia, WCAU-TV, as a result of a complex ownership deal between the network, Westinghouse and NBC. NBC also traded their VHF channel 4 frequency and transmitter in Miami (then home to WTVJ) to CBS in exchange for the channel 6 frequency in Miami (then home to WCIX, which subsequently became WFOR-TV). The deal took effect on September 10, 1995, resulting in the first network affiliation switch in Salt Lake City since KTVX swapped affiliations with KUTV and became an ABC affiliate in 1960. Initially, NBC sought to reaffiliate with KTVX; but after that station renewed its affiliation agreement with ABC, NBC then secured an affiliation deal with KSL-TV. KUTV continued to air one NBC program, Saturday Night Live, for five more months until January 1996, when it was moved to then-WB affiliate KOOG-TV (now CW station KUCW).

On January 14, 1999, a shooter entered the station's Broadcast House facility, allegedly looking for a KSL-TV reporter. Anne Sleater, an employee of another company that was housed in the building, AT&T Wireless Services, was shot during the incident and later died from her injuries. De-Kieu Duy, a 24-year-old female, was arrested in connection with the shooting. Duy was later found mentally incompetent to stand trial and housed in the Utah State Hospital.

In 2002, Bruce Christensen was named the president of KSL-TV; Christensen was a former president of PBS, the former dean of the BYU College of Fine Arts and Communications, as well as a former KSL-TV reporter. During the 2002 Winter Olympics in Salt Lake City, KSL-TV was very influential in bringing coverage and technology to NBC. The station heavily lobbied to NBC that the Games be broadcast live locally.

In July 2010, KSL-TV entered into a local marketing agreement (LMA) with independent station KJZZ-TV (channel 14), after the LMA between that station and KUTV concluded after five years; the LMA was terminated in 2016, after KUTV's owner, Sinclair Broadcast Group, purchased KJZZ.

== Programming ==
In addition to locally produced news and sports programs, and syndicated shows, KSL broadcasts most of the programs seen on NBC's schedule.

Due to its ties to the LDS Church, KSL-TV also airs programs relevant to Mormonism, such as History of the Saints, Music and the Spoken Word and Mormon Times, and preempts regularly scheduled programming to carry the twice yearly LDS General Conference. KSL-TV is one of the few remaining television stations in the United States that still "signs off" at night (though only nominally, because programming immediately continues afterward), doing so at 3:30 a.m. on Sundays.

=== Program preemptions and deferrals ===
Historically, KSL-TV has been known to occasionally preempt or assign out-of-pattern scheduling to certain network programs, either to make room for other local or syndicated programs or because of internal concerns over subject matter that station management deems objectionable, typically due to conflicts with to longstanding LDS Church beliefs. (Many of these preempted programs have aired instead on KUCW (channel 30) or KMYU (channel 12) over the years.) Preemptions based on content objections have periodically led to inquiries over the sustainability of a religious institution owning a network-affiliated station as content standards and practices in broadcast television have relaxed in recent decades in a reflection of cultural change.

As a CBS affiliate, in 1977, Match Game host Gene Rayburn mentioned that the often risque then-CBS daytime game show was not being aired in Salt Lake City. In 1987, the station was among several affiliates that announced that it would not air the children's animated series Garbage Pail Kids ahead of its originally scheduled premiere amid criticism from parental organizations over concerns about the show's violent content and humor ridiculing the handicapped and the perceived likelihood of it merely being a program-length ad for the controversial namesake toys and trading cards. (Amid the controversy, CBS elected not to air it in the U.S., though its distribution arm syndicated it in some international markets.) In the years leading to its switch to NBC, KSL also preempted the 1989–91 sitcom Doctor Doctor (partway into its third and final season in November 1990), and three shorter-lived series—Dirty Dancing (in 1988), prime time soap opera 2000 Malibu Road and adult-oriented sitcom Grapevine (both in 1992)—because of their sexual content. KSL removed Picket Fences midway through its first season, partly due to objections over a January 1993 episode ("Nuclear Meltdowns") centering on a teenage girl who becomes pregnant through an incestuous plural marriage with a polygamist Mormon and the perpetrator's allusion that, although plural marriage within the LDS Church ceased after the 1890 Manifesto (issued in response to Congressional acts to disincorporate and seize assets of the church over the practice), many Mormons still held polygamist beliefs. The drama series returned to KSL in its normal network time slot in April 1993, before being shifted to a one-day delay at 11 p.m. on Saturdays for its second season in September 1993. The station refused CBS's late night Crimetime After Primetime block from September 1990 until its discontinuation after the August 1993 premiere of Late Show with David Letterman (though this was based more on retaining local control of its late night schedule than over content concerns after the failure of the preceding Pat Sajak Show), and preempted the network's Saturday morning children's program lineup after September 1989. It also was among several Mountain Time CBS stations that aired CBS This Morning and its predecessors on a one-hour-ahead basis (from 6 to 8 a.m.) until it shifted the morning show in-pattern in September 1994 to accommodate an expanded (and relocated, as it was moved up two hours to 6 a.m.) local morning newscast.

As an NBC affiliate, KSL declined to air Saturday Night Live throughout its first 18 years with the network; despite this, between 1995 and 2013, the station carried all of the long-running sketch comedy's "best-of" compilations, actor tributes, documentary specials and Saturday evening repeats that NBC aired in prime time. Unlike most of the later preemptions, while potentially objectionable content in the series were somewhat an issue for the station (NBC rebuffed KSL management inquiries about delaying SNL to midnight), the decision was largely made to retain its popular local sports discussion and highlight program SportsBeat Saturday. SNL initially remained on KUTV under arrangement with CBS until January 1996, before moving to then-WB affiliate KOOG. In June 2013, KSL announced that it would start airing SNL in its regular timeslot beginning that fall, after revealing that viewership for SportsBeat had declined in recent years (and was also being beaten by the similar KUTV program Talkin' Sports in its slot); the Utah Utes playing more later evening games against West Coast opponents following its 2011 shift to the Pac-12 Conference from the Mountain West Conference (which played most of its football games in the afternoon) had also made it difficult for SportsBeat to analyze, carry, and package highlights of games that were often still in progress as it aired. KSL-TV also did not air the 1997–99 NBC daytime soap opera Sunset Beach; the soap was seen locally on KOOG instead.

Content-wise, channel 5 declined the short-lived 2003 sitcom Coupling because of its sexual humor and content, and preempted much of NBC's poker programming (such as Poker After Dark throughout its 2007–11 run) due to Church, ownership and LDS-member viewers' objections toward gambling. In September 2011, KSL-TV also preempted The Playboy Club (replacing it with the locally produced newsmagazine We Are Utah), on grounds that the fledgling drama was "completely inconsistent" with the station's mission and branding, not wanting to be associated with the Playboy brand, even though the program did not specifically focus on the magazine nor include any nudity. (KSL sponsors "Out in the Light", a campaign aimed at educating Utahns on mental, marital and sociological issues associated with viewing pornographic material.) The program aired on KMYU in its Monday 9 p.m. time slot until it was canceled by NBC after its third episode. KSL continued to air already-recorded episodes of We Are Utah in the 9 p.m. slot until the October 31, 2011, premiere of Rock Center with Brian Williams. On August 24, 2012, KSL-TV preempted The New Normal (replacing it with the Live Well Network series My Family Recipe Rocks!) on a Tuesday timeslot due to objections to the sitcom's storyline surrounding gay parenting, crude dialogue and potentially offensive characterizations. KUCW ran The New Normal instead in a Saturday night slot. In a twist, although the show was canceled after its first season in May 2013, The New Normal was the first NBC prime time show that KSL has declined to air since it joined the network in 1995 (and the first prime time network show to have been preempted by Channel 5 since Picket Fences) that lasted at least a full season. (Other prime time series declined by the station for objectionable content have, by coincidence due to insufficient national viewership, been among the network's initial cancellation orders during their debut seasons.)

On April 29, 2013, KSL-TV pulled Hannibal after four episodes, due to the drama's graphic violent content and material revolving around the Hannibal Lecter series of novels and films, an action compared by executive producer Bryan Fuller to how Russian newspaper Pravda structured its news coverage to fit the Soviet Communist Party's narrative. KUCW aired the program on Saturday nights (initially following Saturday Night Live, before moving to 11 p.m. for the show's second season), while Hannibal's regular timeslot was occupied on Channel 5 by the weekly newsmagazine KSL In Depth. Hannibal was cancelled after its last episode in August 2015, and the station cleared NBC's entire seasonal prime time schedule for the first time in the 2015–16 season.

On September 4, 2013, KSL announced it was moving Days of Our Lives out of daytime to 1:05 a.m., leading out of the network's late-night talk lineup, effective September 9; a local lifestyle program replaced Days in its former 2 p.m. slot (one of the alternate timeslots that NBC assigned for affiliates to air the soap opera). Other than the plausible outcome that locally originated programming in the daytime hour could allow KSL to attain much more ad revenue with a local program, no reason for the move was explicitly stated, with a common theory floated for the move being a storyline involving openly gay characters Will Horton and Sonny Kiriakis (who later became the first gay couple to be legally married in-canon on a network soap opera), citing historical opposition within the LDS Church to same-sex relationships. It also gave the show a steady DVR-friendly timeslot, where its preemption by breaking news in an overnight timeslot was much rarer than it would be in the afternoon, reducing overall station complaints. The latter reason is much more likely, as KSL continued to air Days in late night until the series moved exclusively to the Peacock streaming service (owned by NBC parent Comcast) in September 2022, even with the subsequent "killing off" and "resurrection" of Will in the series, and Sonny and Will's summer 2020 departure from the show. The NBC News Now-produced afternoon newscast NBC News Daily—which replaced Days on NBC's schedule upon the soap's shift to Peacock—was not carried by KSL during the 2022–23 season, due to existing timeslot commitments to air Dr. Phil and Rachael Ray; it began clearing the program (airing at 1 p.m. weekdays) in September 2023, after the two syndicated talk shows ended their runs. (KSL began airing the network's overnight rebroadcast of NBC News Now's Top Story with Tom Llamas the season before in the timeslot vacated by Days.)

Even with its tradition of screening possibly objectionable programs, some, such as The Book of Daniel (which was not shown by several other NBC affiliates, especially in Bible Belt states) and a paid political message criticizing the Iraq War (which featured Cindy Sheehan) have been aired by the station.

=== Sports programming ===
Owing to NBC's longstanding contract with the International Olympic Committee (IOC), KSL-TV was the local broadcaster of the 2002 Winter Olympics held in Salt Lake City. As host city, NBC excluded KSL from its long-time mandate that its Olympics telecasts be tape delayed on the West Coast (a policy that applied for all other stations, even though the Games were being held in a time zone only an hour ahead of Pacific Time).

=== News operation ===
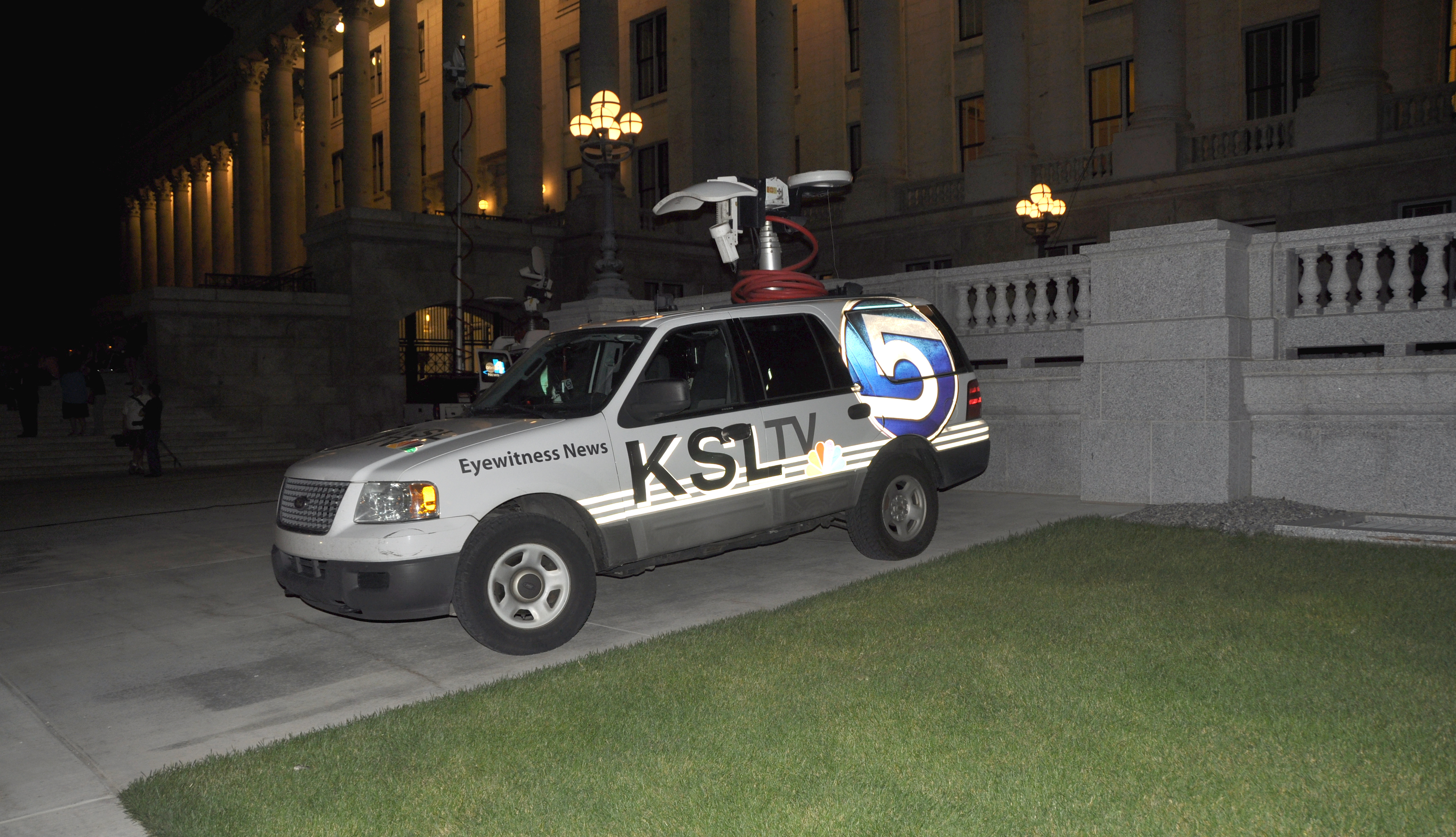
KSL ENG SUV at the Utah State Capitol.

KSL-TV presently broadcasts 30 1/2 hours of locally produced newscasts each week (with 5 1/2 hours each weekday and 1 1/2 hours each on Saturdays and Sundays). Despite its roots in the Deseret News and its link to KSL radio, channel 5 was initially an also-ran in news. That changed in 1965, when the station poached sportscaster Paul James (better known as the voice of BYU football and basketball) and weatherman Bob Welti from KCPX-TV and teamed them with anchor Dick Nourse. Within a few months, channel 5 had rocketed into first place. It would be the dominant news station in Utah for most of the next 45 years, garnering some of the highest ratings in the country. Nourse, James and Welti would remain together until 1991, with Nourse staying on as top anchorman until 2007. In 2008, KSL-TV became the second television station in the Salt Lake City market (after KUTV, which converted in April of that year) to begin broadcasting its local newscasts in high definition. For a long time, the station's newscasts were branded as Eyewitness News; the name was scrapped in 2009 in favor of KSL 5 News, and is now known simply as KSL News.

In November 2010, KUTV, long a distant runner-up, unseated KSL-TV in most timeslots, though channel 5 remained ahead at 10 p.m. However, in February 2011, KSL-TV lost the lead at 10 p.m. for the first time in almost half a century. In December 2011, KSL-TV restored its lead in every time slot in the Nielsen ratings except one—the early morning news slot on weekdays (in the 25- to 54-year-old demographic), where the station finished in third place. Since then, however, KSL-TV has dropped back to a distant runner-up behind KUTV in most time slots. According to media observers, channel 5's ratings slumped after Mark Willes became president of Deseret Management Corporation, the for-profit arm of the LDS Church and Bonneville's parent company, and abandoned the station's longtime focus on hard news in favor of "values-based" reporting. Willes was fired in 2012, but the station's ratings have yet to recover.

==== Notable former on-air staff ====
- Craig Bolerjack – sports anchor
- Jane Clayson – weekend anchor
- Paul James – sports anchor (1965–1991)
- Whit Johnson – weekday anchor and reporter
- Bruce Lindsay – weeknight 5, 6 and 10 p.m. anchor
- Dave McCann – anchor
- Jim Nantz – sports anchor
- Dick Nourse – weeknight 10 p.m. anchor (part of Nourse/Welti/James team)

== Technical information ==
=== Subchannels ===
The station's signal is multiplexed:

Subchannels of KSL-TV
Subchannel	Res.	Short name	Programming
5.1	1080i	KSL-DT	NBC
5.2	1080i	COZI-TV	Cozi TV
5.3	1080i	COZI-TV	Cozi TV

On January 1, 2009, KSL ended its affiliation with NBC Weather Plus on its 5.3 subchannel due to the service's discontinuation by NBC, and relaunched the subchannel as a locally compiled automated weather channel, the Live 5 Weather Channel, which was one of the first local digital weather subchannels in the country to be presented in 480i widescreen. KSL-TV also carried Universal Sports on its 5.2 subchannel until it began to be exclusively distributed through cable and satellite television in January 2012; it was replaced by Live Well Network thereafter. On January 1, 2014, KSL replaced Live Well Network with Cozi TV on digital subchannel 5.2.

=== Analog-to-digital conversion ===
KSL-TV ended regular programming on its analog signal, over VHF channel 5, on June 12, 2009, as part of the federally mandated transition from analog to digital television. The station's digital signal remained on its pre-transition UHF channel 38, using virtual channel 5. As part of the SAFER Act, KSL-TV kept its analog signal on the air until June 26 to inform viewers of the digital television transition through a loop of public service announcements from the National Association of Broadcasters.

Effective September 17, 2018, the station moved its digital signal from channel 38 to channel 23, as part of the broadcast spectrum repacking.

=== Translators ===
KSL-TV is rebroadcast on these following translators:

- Cedar Canyon: K03IW-D
- Long Valley Junction: K04RU-D
- Rockville: K05AR-D
- Toquerville: K07CG-D
- Enterprise: K07ED-D
- Virgin: K08BO-D
- Pine Valley, etc.: K08EN-D
- Helper: K08QG-D
- Sigurd−Salina: K09ZP-D
- Marysvale: K09ZQ-D
- Woodland−Kamas: K09ZR-D
- East Price: K09ZU-D
- Roosevelt, etc.: K09ZW-D
- Big Piney, etc., WY: K10HO-D
- Rural Juab County: K10RG-D
- Blanding−Monticello: K10RK-D
- Ruth: K11ED-D
- Ely−McGill, NV: K11EE-D
- Hildale, etc.: K11QQ-D
- Lund−Preston, NV: K12DE-D
- Laketown, etc.: K12MI-D
- Cedar City: K13CP-D
- Mink Creek, ID: K13HA-D
- Beowawe, NV: K14NU-D
- Circle: K14RG-D
- Mexican Hat: K15JV-D
- Rural Sevier County: K16MC-D
- Teasdale−Torrey: K16MD-D
- Richfield, etc.: K16ME-D
- Koosharem: K16MF-D
- Panguitch: K16MG-D
- Montezuma Creek−Aneth: K16MQ-D
- Henrieville: K16MH-D
- Nephi: K16MI-D
- Price: K16NA-D
- Fruitland: K16NC-D
- Green River: K17HW-D
- Navajo Mountain School: K17IE-D
- Oljeto: K17IF-D
- Mexican Hat, etc.: K17JH-D
- Garfield, etc.: K17MT-D
- Cedar City: K17NK-D
- Orangeville: K17NQ-D
- Mayfield: K18IU-D
- Montpelier, ID: K19DQ-D
- Hatch: K19GJ-D
- Overton, NV: K19ME-D
- Bloomington: K20GJ-D
- Wendover: K20LF-D
- Logan: K20NC-D
- Malad: K20OF-D
- Myton: K21FT-D
- Mount Pleasant: K21IC-D
- Scipio−Holden: K21NN-D
- Leamington: K21NO-D
- Big Piney, WY: K22IY-D
- Eureka, NV: K22NG-D
- Preston, ID: K23GR-D
- Huntsville, etc.: K23IC-D
- Rural Beaver County: K23KO-D
- Summit County: K23NV-D
- Kanarraville: K23OA-D
- Beaver, etc.: K24FE-D
- Orderville: K24LX-D
- Manti, etc.: K26IH-D
- Duckwater, NV: K26JY-D
- Fillmore, etc.: K26OB-D
- Heber−Midway: K27GC-D
- Park City: K27GD-D
- Kanab: K27JV-D
- Loa, etc.: K28OL-D
- Beryl−Modena, etc.: K29FA-D
- Alton: K29JA-D
- Ely, NV: K30CN-D
- Hanksville: K30OP-D
- Fishlake Resort: K30OW-D
- Fillmore, etc.: K30PF-D
- Vernal, etc.: K31JL-D
- Morgan, etc.: K32HK-D
- Duchesne: K32HX-D
- Manila, etc.: K32IA-D
- Cortez, CO: K32IJ-D
- Scofield: K32IZ-D
- Escalante: K32MR-D
- Spring Glen: K32NF-D
- Boulder: K33IZ-D
- Garfield, etc.: K33OJ-D
- Caineville: K33OM-D
- Samak: K33OX-D
- Beaver, etc.: K33PF-D
- Garrison, etc.: K33PH-D
- Clear Creek: K33PO-D
- Hanna, etc.: K34IW-D
- Fountain Green: K34KQ-D
- Capitol Reef National Park: K34OA-D
- Antimony: K34OC-D
- Tropic, etc.: K34OD-D
- Wanship: K34OL-D
- Henefer, etc.: K34OM-D
- Delta, etc.: K34OX-D
- Emery: K34PB-D
- Green River: K34PC-D
- Ferron: K34PH-D
- Huntington: K34PI-D
- Santa Clara, etc.: K35FS-D
- Soda Springs, ID: K35HD-D
- Peoa−Oakley: K35IS-D
- Parowan−Enoch, etc.: K36AI-D
- Randolph: K36FS-D
- Coalville: K36OT-D

== See also ==
- List of three-letter broadcast call signs in the United States
