= Utah State Training School Amphitheater and Wall =

- U.S. National Register of Historic Places
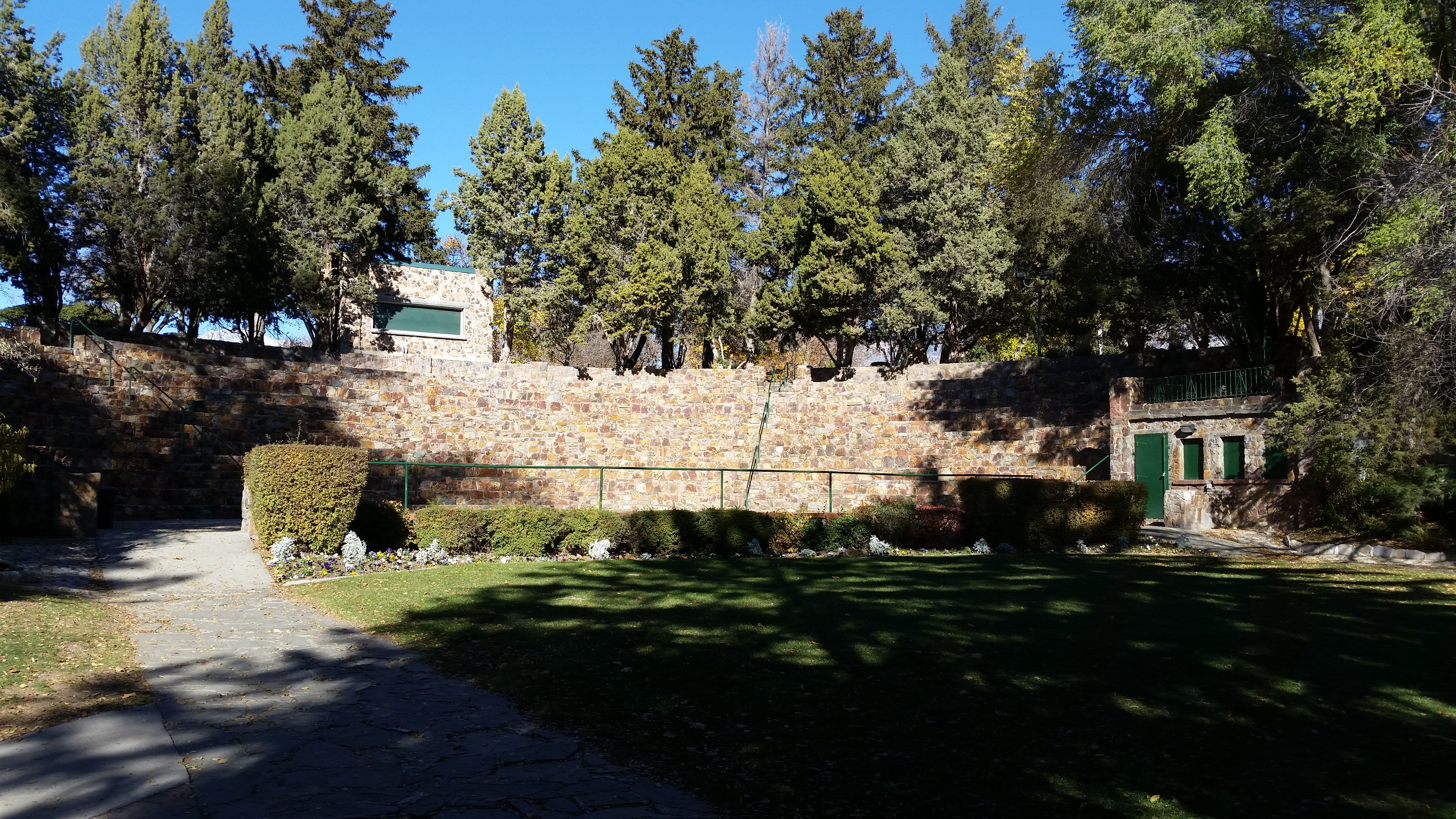
- Utah State Training School Amphitheater, November 2015

- Location within Utah Location within the United States
- Location: Roughly 845 East 700 North; American Fork, Utah; United States
- Coordinates: 40°23′39″N 111°46′31″W
- Area: less than one acre
- Built: 1936
- Built by: Works Progress Administration
- Architectural style: Rustic
- MPS: Public Works Buildings TR
- NRHP reference No.: 94001206
- Added to NRHP: October 7, 1994

The Utah State Training School Amphitheater and Wall, is an amphitheater and boundary wall in northwest American Fork, Utah, United States, that is listed on the National Register of Historic Places.

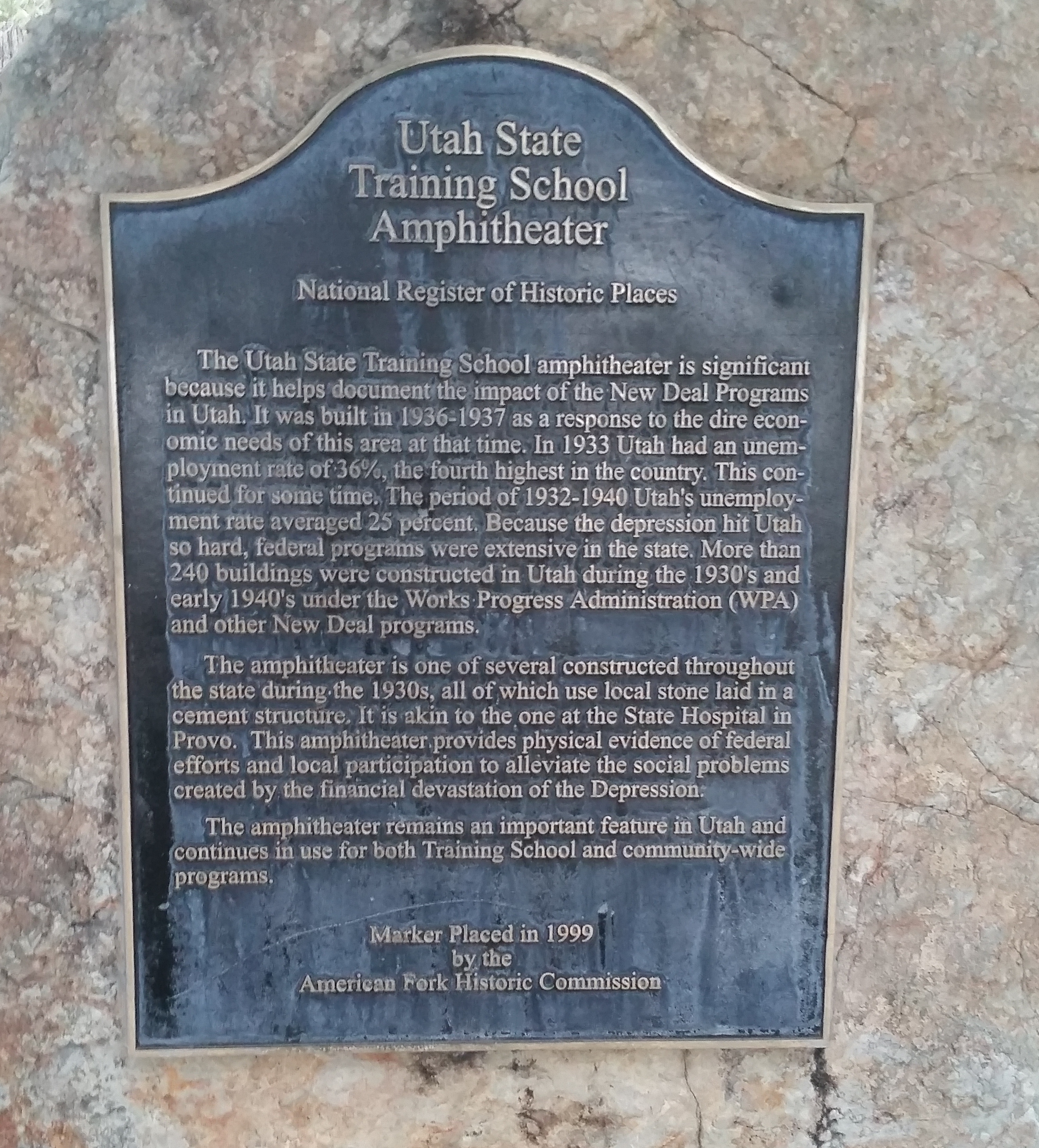
Utah State Training School Amphitheater plaque, December 2016

== Description ==
The structures are located roughly at 845 east 700 north and are part of the Utah State Developmental Center (formerly known as the Utah State Training School). They were built of stone by the Works Progress Administration in 1936.

The amphitheater and wall were jointly added to the National Register of Historic Places October 7, 1994. Completed in 1996, the Mount Timpanogos Temple was built directly east of the amphitheater, just across north 900 rast.

== See also ==
- National Register of Historic Places listings in Utah County, Utah
- Recreation Center for the Utah State Hospital in Provo, also WPS-built and also NRHP-listed
