= Bruce Lindsay (broadcaster) =

American broadcaster (born 1950)

Richard Bruce Lindsay (born 1950) is an American broadcaster who was the most senior male anchor for weeknight broadcasts of the news on KSL TV in Salt Lake City, Utah, from 2007 until his retirement in May 2012. He was awarded an Emmy for his coverage of the 1980 Democratic National Convention. Lindsay retired from his position with KSL to serve as a mission president for the Church of Jesus Christ of Latter-day Saints (LDS Church) in Australia.

== Biography ==
Lindsay is the son of Richard P. Lindsay and his wife, the former Marian Bangerter. He was born in San Francisco, California. At about the age of 20, he served as a missionary for the LDS Church in French Polynesia. He has a degree in broadcasting from Brigham Young University and an MBA from the University of Utah. Lindsay is also the author of The Hometown Weekly: Good News For a Change and the picture book The Christmas List of Richard Lindsay.

Lindsay joined KSL as a reporter in 1978 from KABC-TV in Los Angeles. Within a year, he was promoted to co-anchor alongside Dick Nourse. He was awarded an Emmy for his coverage of the 1980 Democratic National Convention. When Nourse retired in 2007, Lindsay became the station's senior anchorman.

In early 2010, KSL launched Sunday Edition with Bruce Lindsay, which seeks to be an example of "civil dialogue over difficult issues".

Lindsay is married to the former Shari Anderson and they are the parents of six children. He has served in multiple callings in the LDS Church, including bishop and counselor in a stake presidency.

In early 2012, Lindsay announced that he would retire from KSL in the summer, after 34 years. It was later announced by the LDS Church that, at the beginning of July, Lindsay would begin service as president of the church's Australia Perth Mission. He served in that capacity until July 1, 2015. Shortly before his retirement, KSL announced it would be hiring two male anchors (Mike Headrick and Dave McCann) in his place.

When Lindsay retired, Sunday Edition was initially anchored by Richard Piatt. Piatt was later replaced by McCann, Headrick, and Nadine Wimmer who took turns anchoring the program, (with Doug Wright later being brought on to host). The name of the program was later changed to Deseret News Sunday Edition.
