= KSL-FM =

- Midvale, Utah; United States
- Broadcast area: Salt Lake City metropolitan area; Wasatch Front
- Frequency: 102.7 MHz (HD Radio)
- Branding: KSL Newsradio 102.7 FM

Programming
- Format: News–Talk
- Subchannels: HD2: KZNS (Sports); HD3: Latter-day Saints Channel
- Affiliations: ABC News Radio; Westwood One; BYU Cougars; Real Salt Lake

Ownership
- Owner: Bonneville International

History
- First air date: December 1, 1985
- Former call signs: KQMB (1985–2005)
- Call sign meaning: Salt Lake

Technical information
- Licensing authority: FCC
- Facility ID: 54156
- Class: C
- ERP: 25,000 watts
- HAAT: 1,140 meters (3,740 ft)
- Transmitter coordinates: 40°39′34″N 112°12′5″W
- Repeater: (1160 AM) KSL (Salt Lake City)

Links
- Public license information: Public file; LMS
- Webcast: Listen Live on Audacy.com
- Website: kslnewsradio.com

KSL-FM (102.7 FM) is a commercial radio station licensed to Midvale, Utah, and serving the Salt Lake City metropolitan area. KSL-FM and sister station KSL (1160 AM) simulcast a news-talk radio format. They are owned by Bonneville International, a wholly-owned broadcasting subsidiary of the Church of Jesus Christ of Latter-day Saints (LDS). The two stations, alongside co-owned television station KSL-TV, maintain studio facilities in the Broadcast House building at the Triad Center in downtown Salt Lake City.

KSL-FM is a Class C station. It has an effective radiated power (ERP) of 25,000 watts. The KSL-FM transmitter site is on Farnsworth Peak, part of the Oquirrh Mountains in Erda, southwest of Salt Lake City. It is co-located with the KSL-TV tower. KSL-FM broadcasts using HD Radio technology. Its HD2 subchannel rebroadcasts the sports radio format on 1280 KZNS. The HD3 subchannel carries the Latter-day Saints Channel.

The top of the hour identification for KSL-FM and KSL-AM Salt Lake, shortly after 102.7 switched to the simulcast.

== Programming ==
On weekdays, KSL-AM-FM air all-news blocks in morning and afternoon drive time. The rest of the schedule is talk shows and sports. Morning news is anchored by Amanda Dickson and Andy Farnsworth while Jeff Caplan anchors in afternoons. In late mornings, Greg Skordas and Holly Richardson host Inside Sources. Middays with Amanda Shilaos airs at noon. Evenings feature KSL at Night along with repeats of daytime shows.

Specialty shows are featured on weekends. Programs includes KSL Outdoors, The KSL Greenhouse Show, Cougar Sports Saturday, The Movie Show Matinee and Meet The Press. Several LDS religious shows are heard on Sunday mornings, including Music & the Spoken Word, airing on KSL continuously since 1929. Twice a year, KSL-AM-FM carry LDS General Conferences in April and October. Some weekend shows are paid brokered programming. KSL-AM-FM carry Brigham Young University Cougars sports and Real Salt Lake soccer games. The stations are affiliates of ABC News Radio.

== History ==
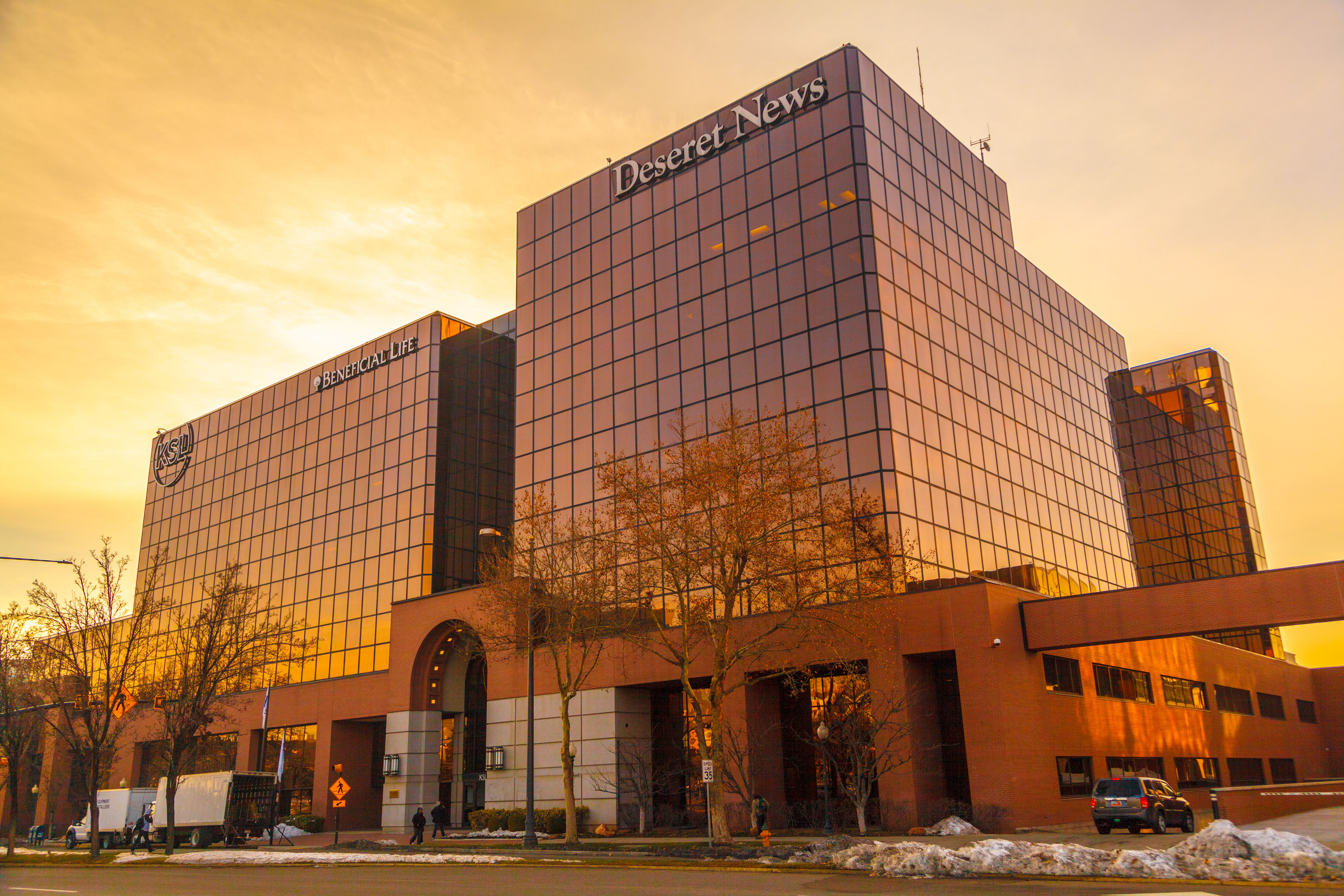
KSL Radio studios are located in the Triad Center in Salt Lake City.

The station signed on the air on December 1, 1985, as KQMB. The call letters referenced its ownership by Quarry Mountain Broadcasting. It had a hot adult contemporary format. In 1998, the station was sold to Simmons Family Inc. for $3,425,000.

Station ownership limitations were loosened in the early 2000s, allowing KSL's parent company to consider expanding its radio station holdings. In December 2003, Bonneville International acquired 15 radio stations from Simmons Media Group, including KQMB. At first, 102.7 maintained its hot AC format. But a short time later, KSL's management saw that some radio listeners preferred the FM band, even for non-music formats, and rarely tuned to AM stations. It decided KSL's news-talk format needed an FM partner.

In September 2005, KQMB was converted to a simulcast of KSL. To match its AM counterpart, KQMB changed its call sign to KSL-FM. The joint operation was branded as "KSL Newsradio 102.7 FM & 1160 AM". Initially the AM signal was considered to be the main station. In recent years, the FM dial position is the only frequency given, omitting 1160 AM.

KQMB's former branding, call sign, and hot adult contemporary format were picked up by an unrelated company. They were put on 96.7 FM in Levan, Utah, a community in the central part of the state.

== See also ==
- Bonneville International
- KSL (AM)
- KSL-TV
- Media in Salt Lake City
- List of three-letter broadcast call signs in the United States
