= Triad Center =

Complex of office buildings in Salt Lake City, Utah, US

Coordinates: 40°46′15.8″N 111°54′1.8″W

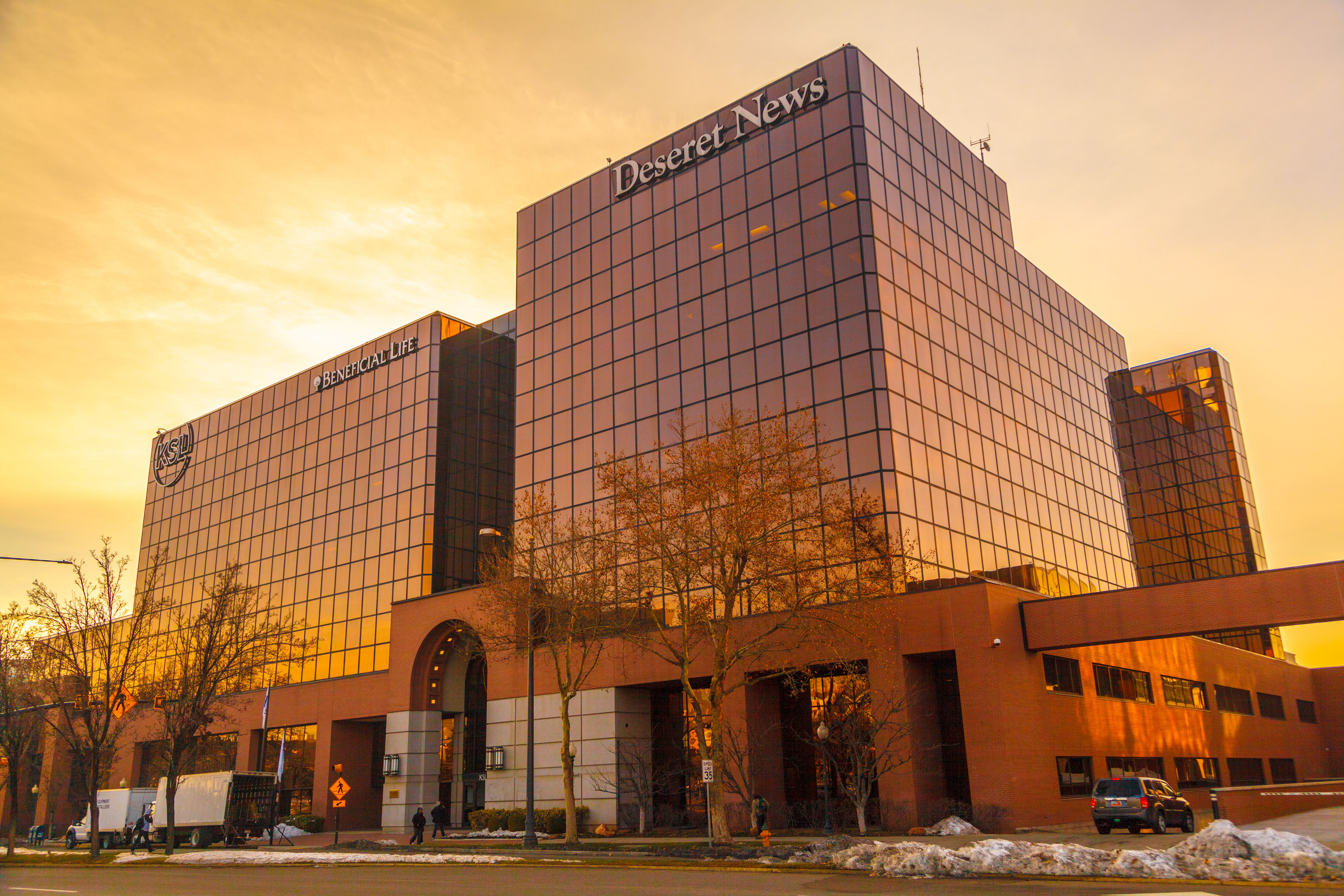
- Triad Center along 300 West
- Interactive map of Triad Center
- Location: Salt Lake City, Utah
- Address: 95 N 300 W
- Status: Partially completed
- Groundbreaking: 1982
- Constructed: 1982-1984
- Opening: 1984
- Use: Office space
- Website: Official Profile

Companies
- Developer: Khashoggi family
- Owner: Utah Property Management Associates

Technical details
- Buildings: 3
- Leasable area: 48,502 square feet (4,500 m^{2})
- Parking: 1

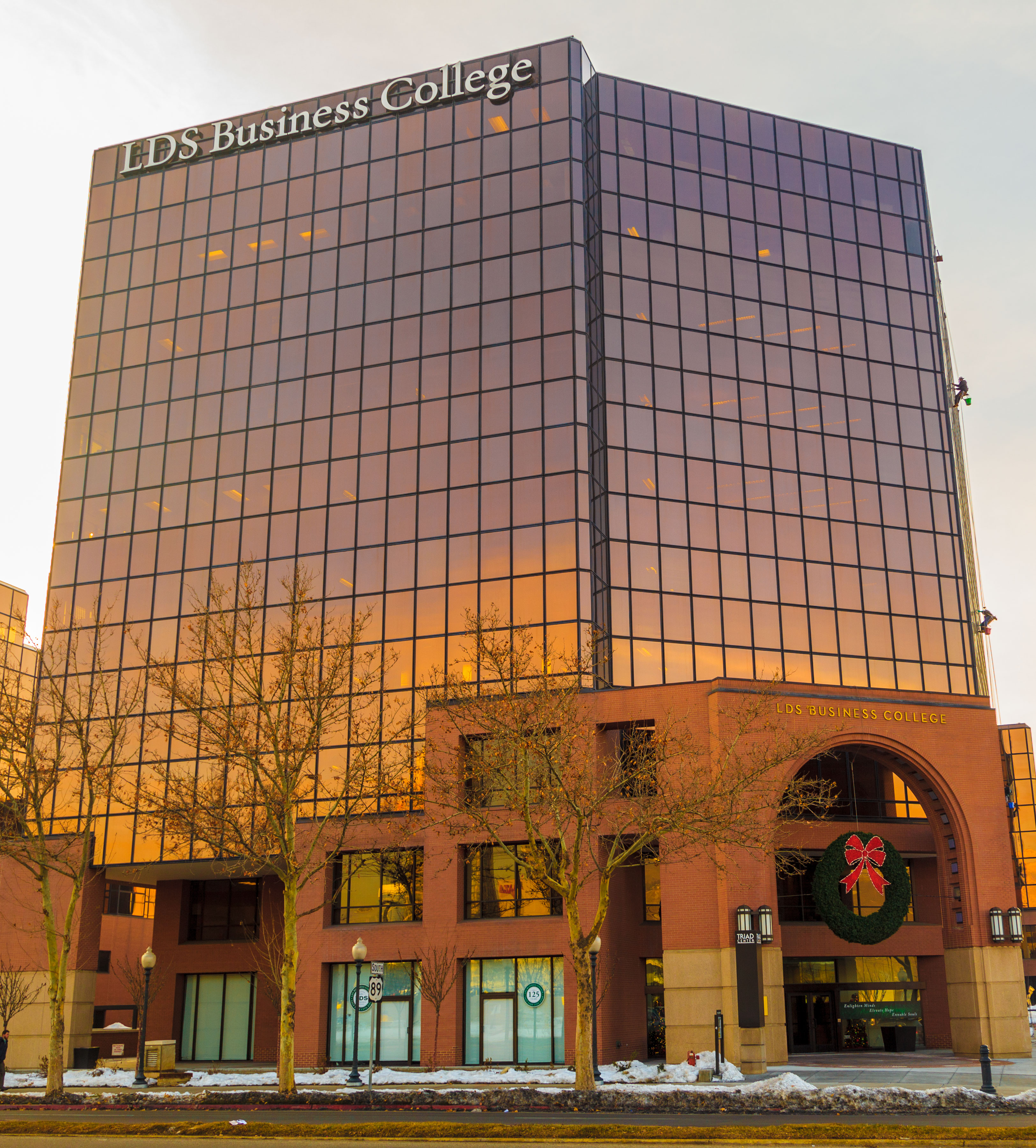
The Ensign College tower at the Triad Center.

The Triad Center is a complex of office buildings in downtown Salt Lake City, Utah, United States. Originally planned as a large development, containing several office and residential buildings (including the tallest buildings in Utah), the project was canceled after only two phases were completed. From 2017 to the present it houses BYU–Pathway Worldwide, Ensign College, the BYU Salt Lake Center, offices of the Deseret News and the studios of KSL-TV and KSL Radio. The landlord and prominent tenants are affiliated in one way or another with the Church of Jesus Christ of Latter-day Saints.

== History ==
Ground was broken for construction of the center on 1 June 1982, by Essam Khashoggi, chairman of Triad America. On the same day, plans for the 10-year-long development were publicly released. They called for the construction of a 26-acre (0.11 km^{2}; 0.041 sq mi) complex with a set of twin 40-story office towers, three 25-story residential towers, a hotel, farmers' market, ice rink, amphitheatre and a park. The complex was to be located on three city blocks in downtown Salt Lake City, and was planned to contain over 1,940,000 square feet (180,000 m^{2}) of office space and 1,430,000 square feet (130,000 m^{2}) of residential space.

The first phase of construction was to last 18 months and to include construction of a broadcast house to hold the studios of KSL radio and television. The second phase was the construction of a 10-story office building, on the northern boundary of the project, known as the North Plaza Office. These buildings were to be constructed surrounding the historic Devereaux House, whose restoration was to be included in the project. On 12 July 1984, the broadcast house was officially opened, and the North Plaza Office building would soon be completed.

During the years following the initial announcement of the development, plans for the remaining phases were scaled back. On 7 June 1985, ground was broken for the first 35-story office building (originally planned to be 40-stories), to be known as 1 Triad Center. 1 Triad Center was the last phase to go into construction, as financial problems put the remaining phases on hold. Excavation for its basement was begun, and steel for the skyscraper was delivered on site, but construction was soon halted. Within a year, the entire development was canceled, leaving only the Broadcast House, North Plaza Office and a parking structure completed. Had 1 Triad Center been completed it would have been the tallest building in Utah.

== Present day ==
The Triad Center is owned by Utah Property Management Associates, a subsidiary of Deseret Management Corporation, the for-profit wing of The Church of Jesus Christ of Latter-day Saints. It was purchased by Zions Securities in 2004 from M&S Triad Center, for an undisclosed amount. The center is located across the street from The Gateway and Vivint Smart Home Arena and is near the City Creek Center development and Temple Square.

From 2017 onward the following are current tenants of the complex:

- KSL-TV
- KSL Radio
- Ensign College
- BYU Salt Lake Center
- BYU–Pathway Worldwide
- A small number of suites are used by private stockbrokers and lawyers.

In August 2010, Deseret News announced it would be moving its offices to the broadcast house in the center, so they could integrate with KSL's newsroom.

On 2 August 2017, BYU–Pathway Worldwide announced that the Triad Center would become its new headquarters.

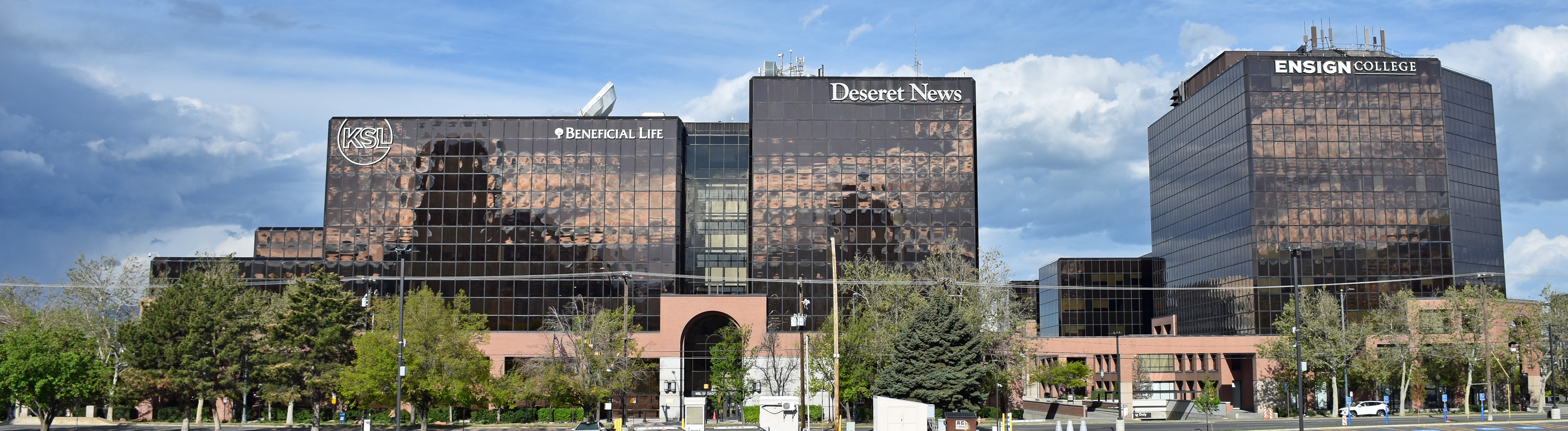
Triad Center in 2026

== 1999 shooting incidents ==
On 14 January 1999, 24-year-old De Kieu Duy, armed with an 9mm handgun, entered the center's broadcast house and began shooting. She fired numerous rounds in the building's lobby, injuring the building manager. She then rode the elevator to the upper floors where she fatally shot 30-year-old Anne Sleater, an AT&T employee. Sleater's co-worker, Ben Porter, then wrestled Duy to the ground, ending the shooting spree. Duy was later found mentally incompetent to stand trial and as of May 2020 is still housed in the Utah State Hospital.

Three months later, a second shooting, one block away, at the LDS Church Family History Library, led to the Triad Center being evacuated. During that shooting, a truck with a suspicious note was found parked near the Triad Center, and fears arose that the shooter or a possible accomplice had planted a bomb in the truck. Later that afternoon, Salt Lake City Police Department detonated an explosive charge attached to the truck, gaining access to its cargo. Inside, two 55-US-gallon (210 L) drums, one empty and one containing gasoline, were found. It was later learned the truck driver and his cargo were not related to the shooting, and it was just a case of being in the wrong place at the wrong time.

== See also ==
- City Creek Center
- Adnan Khashoggi, Saudi arms dealer
