= Utah State Hospital =

- Utah Department of Human Services

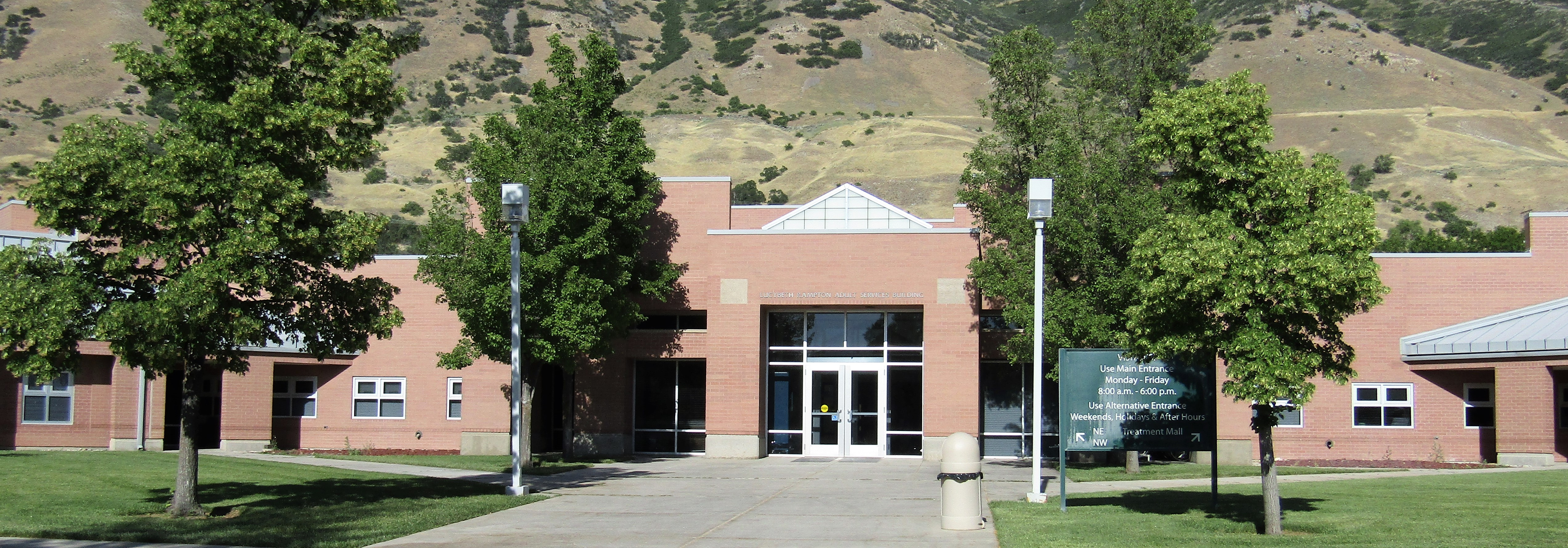
- The Lucybeth Rampton Adult Services Building in June 2017

Geography
- Location: Provo, Utah, United States
- Coordinates: 40°14′03″N 111°38′04″W

Organization
- Type: Mental hospital

Services
- Beds: 324

History
- Founded: 1885

Links
- Website: ush.utah.gov
- Lists: Hospitals in Utah

The Utah State Hospital (USH) is a mental hospital located in eastern Provo, Utah. The current superintendent is Dallas Earnshaw.

== History ==
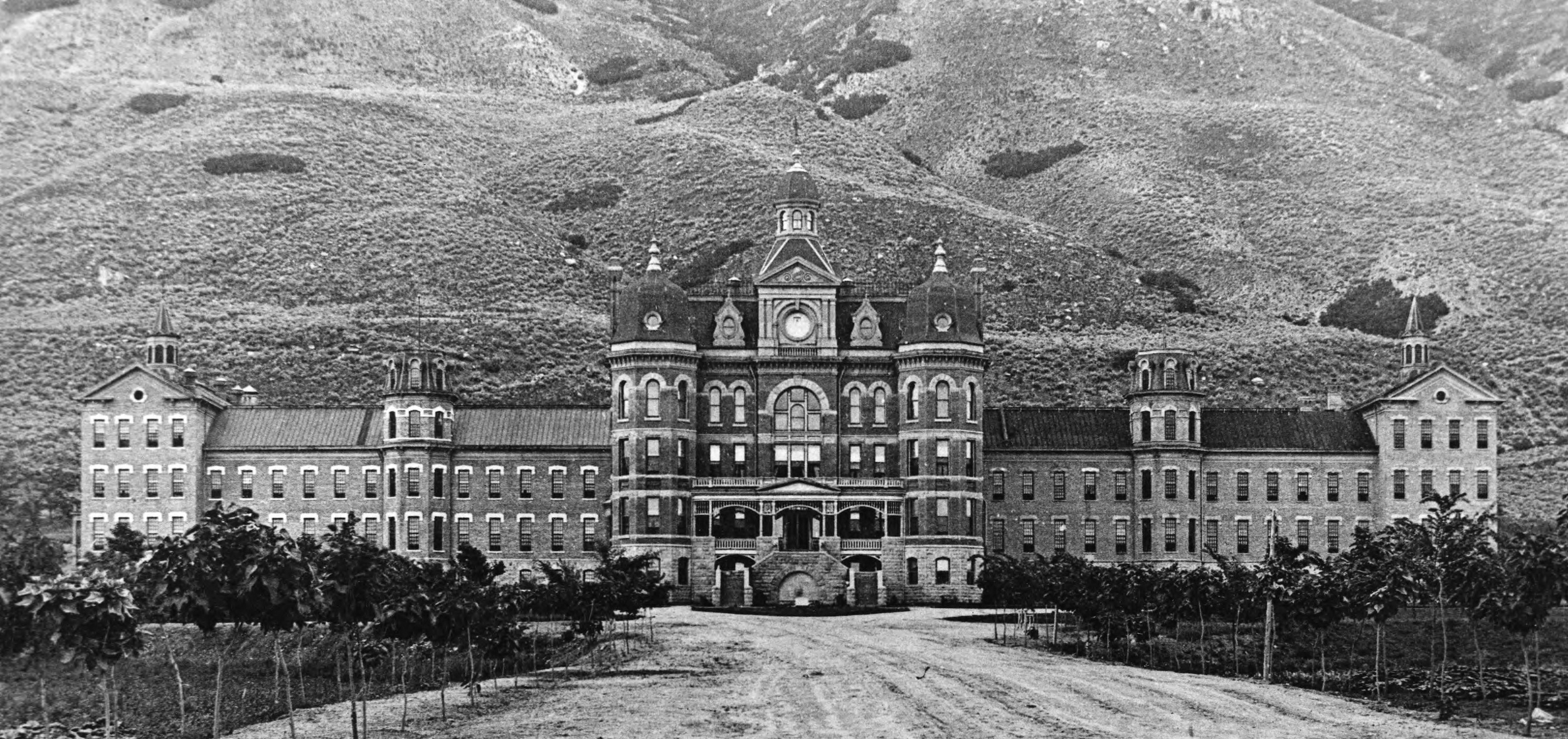
The Utah State Hospital, circa 1896

The Utah State Hospital began as the Territorial Insane Asylum in 1885 at Provo, Utah, with the purpose of housing and treating those considered to be mentally ill and attempting to return them to normal levels of functioning. However, due to limited knowledge about treatment of mental health at the time, the hospital became little more than a place for the mentally ill to live. The site chosen in Provo was eight blocks from the nearest residence and was separated from the city by swampland and the city dump. The supervising architect of the 1885-completed building was John H. Burton, who planned the building during the period from 1881 until his death, after which his assistant/colleague Richard K.A. Kletting was appointed.

In 1903 the Asylum was renamed the Utah State Mental Hospital, and in 1927 it adopted its current name in an effort to eliminate the negative stigma associated with the word “mental.” Long-term patients at the hospital engaged in work therapy, which gave them something to do and also made USH self-sustaining. The hospital originally sat on 600 acres of land, and housed a dairy, a hay barn, and a piggery, as well as chickens, rabbits, and pigeons. Residents took care of the animals and also harvested fruits and vegetables from the orchards and gardens on campus.

As more and more patients began their indefinite incarceration at the hospital, problems of overcrowding arose. In the 1940s USH had 700 beds, but the hospital was housing over 1,100 patients. It was not uncommon to see mattresses lining the hallways, and the large surplus of patients made it difficult for staff members to focus their attention on individuals. Dr. Owen P. Heninger became the superintendent of USH in 1942. He recognized the need for change at the hospital, and as a result, he pioneered a new treatment philosophy. His new treatments included adopting smaller treatment units, involving patients in the implementation of their own treatment plans, and encouraging more humane treatment.

Another influential figure in USH's history is Lucy Beth Rampton, Utah's first lady in the 60s and 70s. She was a well-respected member of the community who happened to struggle with depression. Her open discussion of her illness helped quell some of the stigma surrounding mental illness, and her advocacy for treatment of mental illness helped raise awareness about mental health in Utah.

In 1969, USH's role changed. Care for the mentally ill shifted from institutional care to community-based care. Treatment was offered closer to home. USH eventually adopted the practice that it still follows today: only those with severe mental illness are admitted for ongoing treatment. Today the Utah State Hospital provides 324 beds for Utah's mentally ill persons who require treatment in a more structured setting and are assessed to be unable to receive adequate treatment at regional centers. Those patients include children, youth, and adults. USH now provides numerous therapy options, as well as a forensics unit to rehabilitate patients who have committed criminal acts or are accused but not competent to stand trial. Patients stay at USH for an average of six months. The hospital has developed specialized programs for children, youth, and adults. USH offers a wide variety of treatments to accommodate patients’ needs. Some treatments involve physical and occupational therapy, while others, such as pediatric playgroups, community cooking, and outdoor youth activities, contribute to overall mental and emotional well-being.

== Internal structure of the Utah State Hospital ==
=== Overview ===
The governor of Utah is in charge of USH, but day-to-day operations fall under the direction of the hospital's superintendent. The superintendent works primarily with Utah's Division of Substance Abuse and Mental Health (DSAMH).

DSAMH has created a governing body to oversee the operations of USH. This body includes the superintendent, the director of DSAMH, the clinical director and the medical-staff president of USH, representatives of the Department of Human Services, patients, and patients’ families. The governing body authorizes the hospital executive staff to manage the hospital's daily operations.

The superintendent reports all major matters concerning hospital operations to the governing body during regular meetings. The clinical director reports to the governing body regarding the operations of the hospital medical staff, professional discipline directors, and other clinical and administrative services.

=== Internal structure ===
The superintendent is appointed by the director of the Department of Human Services (DHS) with the joint approval of the DSAMH director. The superintendent is responsible for USH's buildings, grounds, and property. The superintendent also recommend staffing needs to the director of DSAMH and to the director of DHS.

Right now, USH has 753 employees. The state of Utah and the U.S. government provide operational policies and procedures governing personnel matters, fiscal accounting, purchasing records, and life safety. USH's on-call procedure provides 24-hour physician and administrator services.

=== Employee infrastructure ===
The executive staff of the hospital manages all USH administrative and clinical services. This executive team consists of the hospital clinical director, the assistant superintendent, the assistant clinical director, the nursing administrator, the director of Forensic and Safety Services, the chief financial officer, the human resources director, the director of quality resources, and the administrative assistants. The superintendent is responsible for hiring the members of the executive team and serves as a liaison with DSAMH, DHS, courts, the state legislature, and the governmental offices with which USH interacts. In addition, the superintendent may choose to delegate some responsibilities to the staff of the hospital.

The hospital clinical director is directly responsible for supervising the assistant clinical director and the director of medical services. In addition, the hospital clinical director supervises psychiatrists, medical consultants, directors of the professional disciplines, patient advocates, physicians, and pharmacy contracts. The assistant superintendent helps both the superintendent and the clinical director. The assistant clinical director and the admissions officer help the clinical director run the treatment mall, pastoral services, volunteer services, recreation therapy, occupational therapy, vocational rehabilitation, psychology services, social work, substance abuse rehabilitation, and other standing committees.

The nurse executive supervises the education and discipline of the nursing administrators. The director of Forensic and Safety Services assists the superintendent in monitoring security, legal services, and risk management. The chief financial officer reports financial planning and budgeting to you and the executive staff. The human resources manager is in charge of personnel. The quality resources director administers quality improvement processes.

== Budget process ==
Each year the Utah State Legislature and the governor approve USH's budget. Over the past several years, the budget has been fairly consistent. About 80 percent of the budget comes from the general state fund, which is supported by revenue from state taxes. The remaining 20 percent comes from Medicare and Medicaid.

== Expense breakdown ==
About 80 percent of USH's total budget covers personnel costs, and another 15 percent goes toward medication and food. The remaining 5 percent covers other overhead, which consists mainly of facility maintenance.

== Patient services ==
The services USH provides can be broken down into three main categories: adult mental health, pediatric mental health, and forensic services.

The adult-services division provides an environment in which patients are treated with dignity and respect. Through individualized treatment, patients are eventually able to return to the community to continue their lives.

The pediatric-services division serves around 25 boys and girls from 6 to 13 years old. These children face mental, emotional, and behavioral problems. The pediatric-services division also serves about 50 youth from 14 to 18 years old. The therapies most commonly used with this age group fall into the categories of abuse treatment, anger management, emotional management, and recreational therapy.

The forensic-services division consists of four maximum-security psychiatric-treatment units and serves about 100 male and female patients. These patients are admitted to USH by mandate of the Utah District Courts. Treatment for such patients includes medication, individual, group, and family therapy, work opportunities, physical therapy, and occupational therapy.

In addition to ongoing treatment of mental illness, USH also provides chaplain services, health clinics, dietetic services, nursing services, occupational therapy, psychiatric services, psychological services, physical therapy, social services, therapeutic recreation services, and vocational rehabilitation.

== Challenges ==
=== Financial and personnel challenges ===
Most of USH's budget covers the salaries of full- and part-time employees. The superintendent has the responsibility of recruiting, training, and retaining quality employees. Since USH cannot compete with private-sector wages, the hospital needs to be creative in offering incentives to its employees.

=== Social stigma surrounding mental health ===
Despite increased public awareness in recent years, there is still a negative stigma attached to mental health issues. Sometimes, because of this stigma, people who are mentally ill are ashamed to seek the treatment they need. In addition, the stigma may affect the amount of funding that the hospital receives in comparison to other state institutions and projects.

=== Limited public awareness ===
USH is probably one of the most secure facilities in the state, aside from the state prisons. Because it is so inaccessible to the public, members in the community often do not understand what goes on inside the hospital. Some Provo residents do not even know the hospital exists. This lack of awareness makes it difficult to educate the public about mental health and the resources that are available for victims of mental illness.

== Work with third parties ==
USH works with other organizations on a daily basis. These organizations include mental health centers, state and federal governments, district courts, and the National Alliance on Mental Illness.

=== Mental health centers ===
In addition to USH, Utah has 13 community mental-health centers throughout Utah. These community centers are the entry point for patients who need medical attention for mental illness. Patients first receive treatment in one of the community care centers. Those patients who need extended treatment are sent to USH.

The hospital also works with acute-care facilities such as the University Neuropsychiatric Institute and Salt Lake Behavioral Health. These institutions provide temporary care for the mentally ill. As with the community care centers, if patients require long-term care they are transferred to USH.

=== State legislature and federal policies and funding ===
The state legislature is an important overseer of USH. The state legislature must approve budgets, resource reallocations, and all other major decisions.

The federal policies surrounding Medicaid are an important regulatory aspect of patient care. USH cannot provide care without Medicaid funding, so it is essential that administrators understand and abide by the regulations.

=== State district courts ===
Utah State District Court judges decide which individuals need to be admitted to USH and when they are ready to be discharged. Social workers are also involved in the treatment plan of patients.

=== The National Alliance on Mental Illness ===
The National Alliance on Mental Illness (NAMI) initiates public-awareness campaigns and other initiatives. As superintendent, you and your colleagues will have to decide which of NAMI's initiatives you want to adopt and to what extent DSAMH and USH should implement them.

== Haunted Castle ==
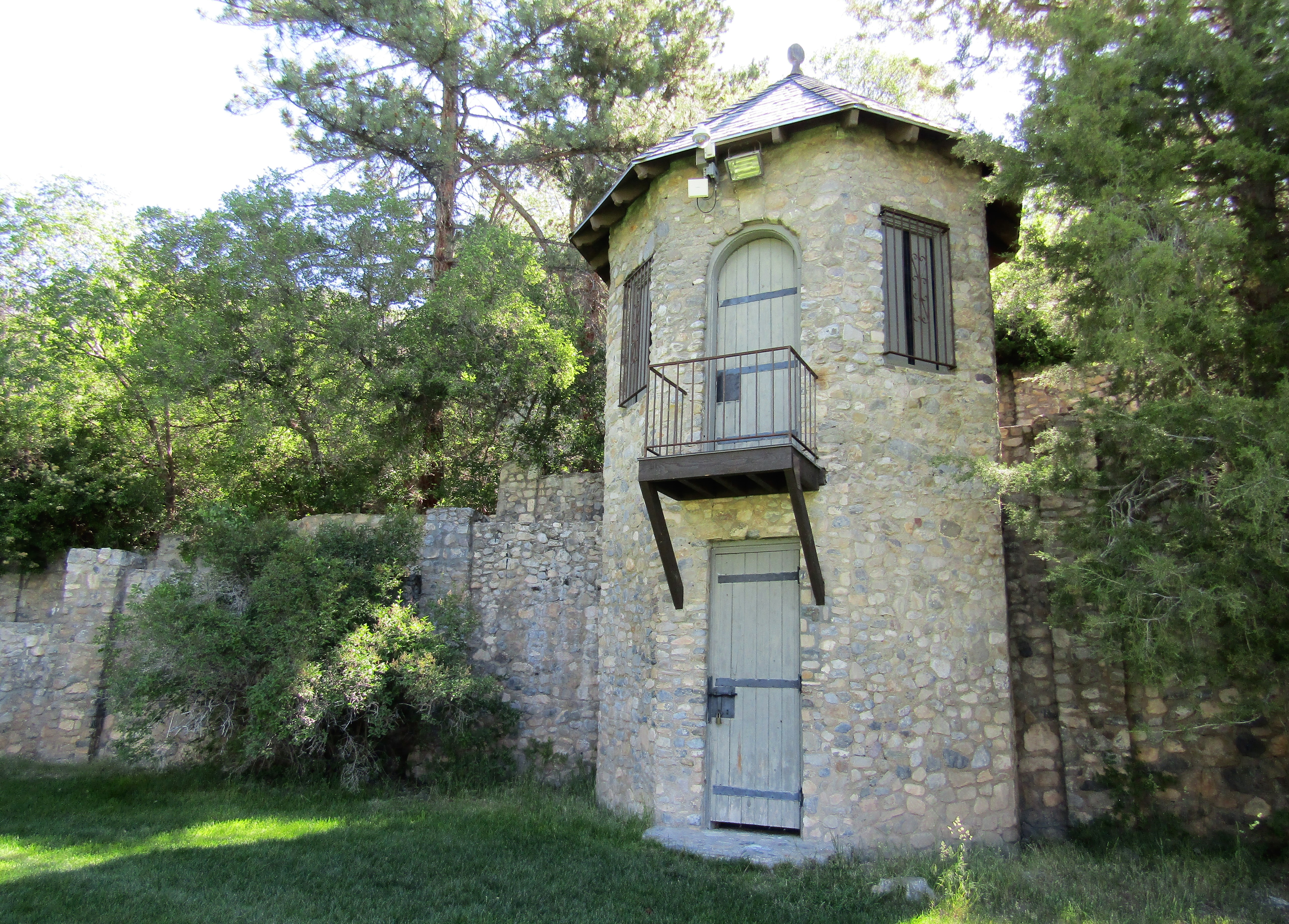
The amphitheater's castle tower, June 2018

Starting October 1971 the Utah State Hospital started a "spook alley" titled the Haunted Castle, due to the stone structured amphitheater located behind the hospital in which the attraction was assembled. The Haunted Castle started off as a "closed" Halloween celebration event developed by the patients, but success with the activity eventually caused it to grow to a more public performance. The attraction was operated in a joint effort by patients and staff. Patient participation was a privilege and based on individual patient behavior and only those determined to be a minimal risk to themselves or others were allowed access to the public. Additionally, many patients not able to interact with the public were allowed to help with construction/deconstruction of the facilities used for the spook alley. The Utah State Hospital used popularity from the event to help raise public awareness of mental illness. All proceeds from the Haunted Castle went into the Utah State Hospital's recreational therapy program to subsidize improved activities that directly benefited the patients.

The final production was put on by the State Hospital in October 1997. The activity was permanently closed largely due to efforts by the National Alliance on Mental Illness (NAMI) who objected to the activity because they felt it served to stereotype the patients by linking mental illness with monsters and violence in the public's mind. Several doctors, therapists, and patients at the hospital cited that the activity produced therapeutic results unachievable elsewhere which should be taken into account, but the Utah State Legislature determined that NAMI's objections were warranted.

== See also ==
- List of hospitals in Utah
