= KHKR =

Radio station in Washington–St. George, Utah

- Washington, Utah; United States
- Broadcast area: St. George–Cedar City, Utah
- Frequency: 1210 kHz

Ownership
- Owner: Townsquare Media; (Townsquare License, LLC)
- Sister stations: KCIN, KDXU, KDXU-FM, KIYK, KREC, KSUB, KXBN

History
- First air date: February 1, 1982
- Last air date: December 2024
- Former call signs: KCLG (1982–1987); KONY (1987–1999); KUNF (1999–2013)

Technical information
- Facility ID: 55398
- Class: B
- Power: 10,000 watts (day); 231 watts (night)
- Transmitter coordinates: 37°4′5.9″N 113°31′6.8″W
- Translator: 97.7 K249EQ (St. George)

The radio tower for KHKR outside St. George, Utah

KHKR (1210 AM) was an American radio station broadcasting a sports format. Licensed to Washington, Utah, United States, the station was owned by Townsquare Media.

== History ==
The station went on the air as KCLG on February 1, 1982. On May 5, 1987, the station changed its call sign to KONY. On September 9, 1999, the station became KUNF, and then KHKR on July 11, 2013.

Former logo

The Federal Communications Commission cancelled the station’s license on December 23, 2024. KHKR's ESPN Radio programming moved to the second HD Radio channel of KDXU-FM; the station's former FM translator, 97.7 K249EQ, now relays this subchannel.
