= KDXU =

KDXU may refer to:

- KDXU (AM), a radio station (890 AM) licensed to serve St. George, Utah, United States
- KDXU-FM, a radio station (106.1 FM) licensed to serve Colorado City, Arizona, United States
- KIYK, a radio station (107.3 FM) licensed to serve St. George, Utah, which held the call sign KDXU-FM from 1973 to 1978
