= KXBN =

Radio station in Cedar City, Utah

- Cedar City, Utah; United States
- Broadcast area: St. George, Cedar City, Utah
- Frequency: 92.1 MHz
- Branding: B 92.1

Programming
- Format: Top 40 (CHR)
- Affiliations: Compass Media Networks; Premiere Networks

Ownership
- Owner: Townsquare Media; (Townsquare License, LLC)
- Sister stations: KCIN, KDXU, KDXU-FM, KIYK, KREC, KSUB

History
- First air date: November 1976
- Former call signs: KSUB-FM (1976–1984); KSSD (1984–1999); KCIN (1999–2001); KXFF (2001–2006)
- Former frequencies: 92.5 MHz (1976–2007)

Technical information
- Licensing authority: FCC
- Facility ID: 61386
- Class: C
- ERP: 100,000 watts
- HAAT: 532.0 meters (1,745.4 ft)
- Transmitter coordinates: 37°38′43″N 113°22′22″W
- Translators: 104.3 K282AC (Rural Garfield County); 102.3 K272BA (Panguitch); 92.1 KXBN-FM1 (St. George)

Links
- Public license information: Public file; LMS
- Webcast: Listen live
- Website: b921hits.com

KXBN (92.1 FM) is a radio station broadcasting a contemporary hit radio format. Licensed to Cedar City, Utah, United States, the station serves the Cedar City–St. George area. The station is owned by Townsquare Media.

== History ==
=== KSUB-FM ===
On December 12, 1973, the Federal Communications Commission (FCC) granted a construction permit to the Southern Utah Broadcasting Company, owner of KSUB (590 AM), for a new FM radio station in Cedar City. The construction process was beset with delays. After originally filing to use its AM transmitter site, Southern Utah Broadcasting opted to move the transmitter to Iron Mountain. That application took 16 months to be granted, because the company had to assure the FCC that the move further south would not cause impermissible interference to an FM station in Las Vegas, despite being nominally short-spaced to it.

Construction itself was a difficult process, because there were no utilities or access to the transmitter site; half a mile of power line had to be constructed, alongside a road up the east face of the mountain. The biggest problem, however, echoed one faced by its AM sister station nearly four decades prior. While the new tower was being put into place using a helicopter, gusty winds tangled the guy lines in the tower, and corrective efforts led to the tower crashing to the ground. KSUB-FM finally began broadcasting in November 1976, airing country music.

The Cedar City outlet was heard in St. George for the first time after securing FCC approval to build a translator there. TV translator systems in the region that also relayed FM signals also built translators to carry the station into Millard County and Kanab. The station had five translators by January 1985.

=== KSSD and KCIN ===
On March 1, 1984, KSUB and KSUB-FM switched formats, with country music moving to AM and adult contemporary to FM, which became KSSD; the new call sign was inspired by the "Sun Kissed" motto for the area used by the St. George chamber of commerce. Cited as a move to put country music on a more accessible AM dial position, it was also a decision that came in advance of the 1985 opening of Kanab-based country outlet KCKK (101.1 FM).

KSSD picked up the Pure Gold syndicated format from Satellite Music Networks in 1988, marking a format shift to oldies. By 1991, however, KSSD had switched back to country.

The call sign was changed on October 19, 1999, to KCIN, coinciding with a rebrand to "Kickin' Country".

=== "The Fox" and "B" ===
On June 21, 2001, a shuffle among co-owned radio stations moved the Kickin' Country format to 940 AM, replacing adult standards "Magic 940". On the 92.5 frequency and its translators, it was replaced by KXFF "The Fox", airing an oldies format.

More than 35 years of ownership of KSUB, and later of KSUB-FM, by members of the Johnson family ended in 2005 when KSUB and its four sister stations were sold to Cherry Creek Radio for $5.8 million, marking the group's entrance into the southwestern Utah radio market.

Cherry Creek conducted a format shuffle in 2006 and moved the contemporary hit radio programming and call sign of KXBN, previously at 94.9 MHz, to 92.5. The station itself moved to 92.1 MHz in 2007; the move was part of an adjustment of allocations necessary to add new stations proposed for Ash Fork and Peach Springs, Arizona.

=== Sale to Townsquare Media ===
On March 24, 2022. Townsquare Media announced that it would acquire Cherry Creek Media for $18.75 million, including all of 35 stations that Cherry Creek owns. The deal was set to close by the end of June, and was consummated on June 17.

== Translators and boosters ==
KXBN has one co-channel booster, KXBN-FM1 in St. George. A permit for a second booster to be located in Hurricane, KXBN-FM2, has been granted and is awaiting construction.

The station is also carried on two translators owned by Garfield County, K282AC (104.3 FM) on Barney Top and K272BA (102.3 FM) at Panguitch.
