= KAZZ (AM) =

- Parowan, Utah; United States
- Broadcast area: Cedar City, Utah
- Frequency: 1400 kHz
- Branding: The Fan Sports Network

Programming
- Format: Sports
- Affiliations: Infinity Sports Network

Ownership
- Owner: M. Kent Frandsen; (Canyon Media Group, Inc.)
- Sister stations: KCLS, KONY, KPLD, KSGO, KZEZ, KZHK

History
- First air date: October 7, 2004 (as KENT)
- Former call signs: KSUR (2001–2002); KZEZ (2002); KITT (2002–2004); KENT (2004–2014)

Technical information
- Licensing authority: FCC
- Facility ID: 129732
- Class: C
- Power: 1,000 watts
- Transmitter coordinates: 37°48′22″N 112°56′40″W
- Translators: 93.1 K226CM (Cedar City); KONY-HD2: 95.3 K237GA (St. George)
- Repeater: 99.9 KONY-HD2 (St. George)

Links
- Public license information: Public file; LMS
- Webcast: Listen Live
- Website: thefansportsnetwork.com

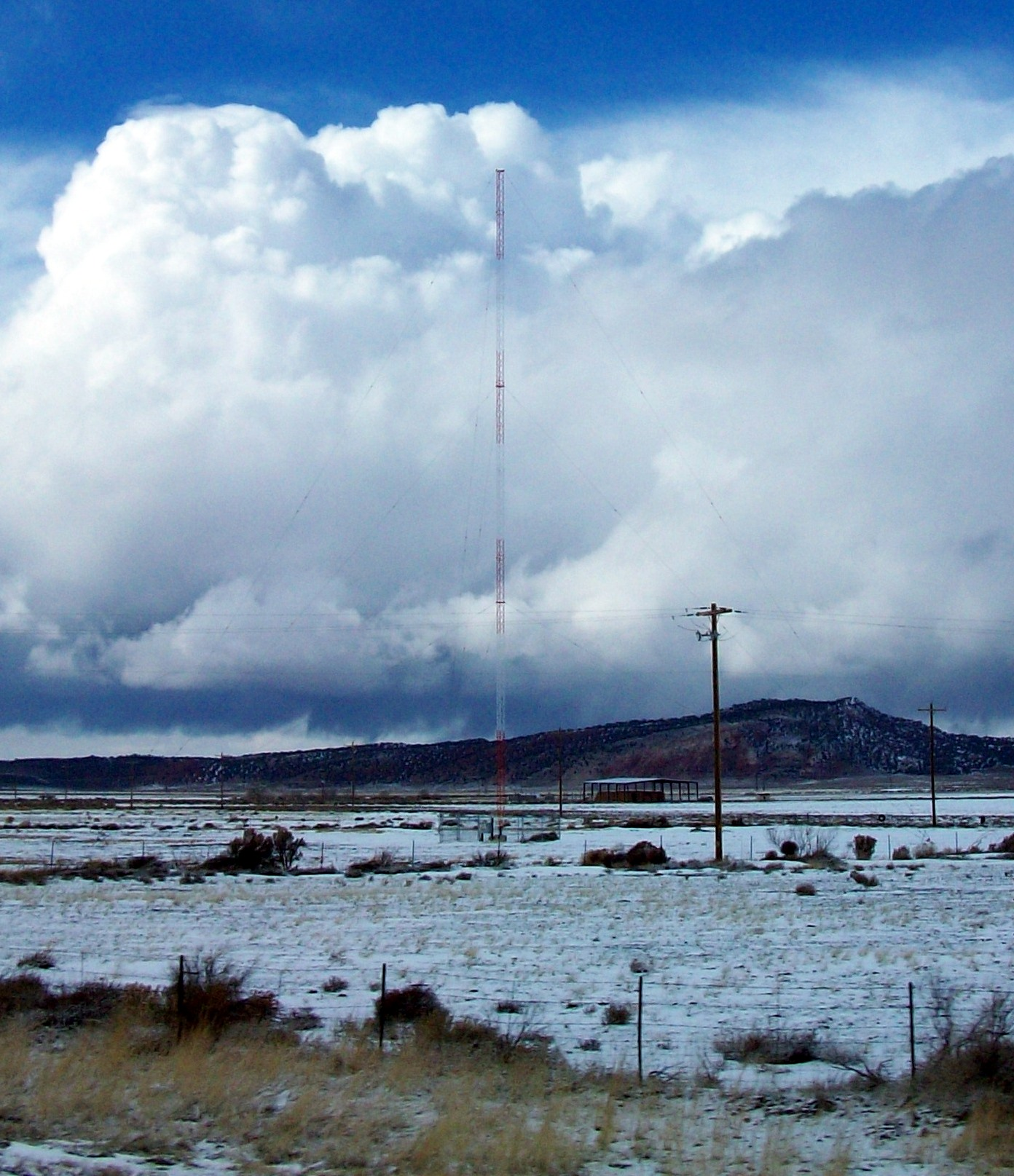
The radio tower for KAZZ outside of Parowan, Utah.

KAZZ (1400 kHz) is an AM radio station broadcasting a sports format. Licensed to Parowan, Utah, United States, the station is currently owned by M. Kent Frandsen, through licensee Canyon Media Group, Inc.

== Translator ==
KAZZ serves the Cedar City - St. George, Utah radio market and rebroadcasts on FM translator station K226CM 93.1 MHz, licensed to Cedar City, Utah.

== History ==
The station began broadcasting in October 2004, carrying the adult standards format of Dial Global Networks and CNN Radio News from Westwood One. The call sign KENT was assigned in May 2004

On May 29, 2009, the Fifth District Court of Utah in Washington County, UT appointed a receiver to take over KENT for US Capital, Incorporated of Boulder CO, an investment group that foreclosed on Legacy Media, the owners of KENT and several other stations. The station was sold to M. Kent Frandsen of Logan, UT for $12,000 in a court-approved sale. The transaction, through Frandsen's Canyon Media Group, Inc., was consummated on May 31, 2013. The station changed its call sign to KAZZ on November 27, 2014.

On August 4, 2021 KAZZ changed their format from adult standards to sports, branded as "Fox Sports Southern Utah", with programming from Fox Sports Radio.

On December 5, 2022, Fox Sports Radio programming was removed from the station and moved to KXFF.
