= KZEZ =

Radio station in Santa Clara, Utah

- Santa Clara, Utah; United States
- Broadcast area: St. George, Utah
- Frequency: 1490 kHz
- Branding: KZEZ 102.7

Programming
- Format: Oldies
- Affiliations: ABC News Radio

Ownership
- Owner: M. Kent Frandsen; (Canyon Media Group, LLC)
- Sister stations: KAZZ, KCLS, KONY, KPLD, KSGO, KZHK

Technical information
- Licensing authority: FCC
- Facility ID: 160278
- Class: C
- Power: 1,000 watts
- Transmitter coordinates: 37°06′42″N 113°30′43″W
- Translators: 100.7 K264CT (Santa Clara); KONY-HD3: 102.7 K274CQ (St. George)
- Repeater: 99.9 KONY-HD3 (St. George)

Links
- Public license information: Public file; LMS
- Webcast: Listen live
- Website: www.kzezfm.com

KZEZ (1490 AM) is a radio station licensed to serve the community of Santa Clara, Utah. The station is owned by M. Kent Frandsen, through licensee Canyon Media Group, LLC, and airs an oldies music format.

The station was assigned the KZEZ call letters by the Federal Communications Commission on September 26, 2017.
