= KCSG (disambiguation) =

KCSG may refer to:

- the KCSG television station in Utah, United States.
- KCSG-LD, a low-power television station (channel 31, virtual 8) licensed to serve Ogden, Utah
- the ICAO airport code for Columbus Airport, Georgia, United States.
- Knight Commander of Saint Gregory, a class in one of the orders of knighthood of the Holy See
