= KSGO =

Talk radio station in St. George, Utah

- St. George, Utah; United States
- Broadcast area: St. George, Utah
- Frequency: 1450 kHz
- Branding: Patriot Radio 1450

Programming
- Format: Conservative talk radio
- Affiliations: Fox News Radio; Compass Media Networks; Genesis Communications Network; Premiere Networks; Salem Radio Network; USA Radio Network; Westwood One

Ownership
- Owner: Canyon Media Corporation
- Sister stations: KPLD; KONY; KZHK; KCLS; KAZZ; KZEZ

History
- First air date: December 1986
- Former call signs: KATJ (1985–1987); KDLX (1987–1988); KSLI (1988); KSGI (1988–1998); KTSP (1998–2001); KZNU (2001–2023)

Technical information
- Licensing authority: FCC
- Facility ID: 12325
- Class: C
- Power: 1,000 watts unlimited
- Transmitter coordinates: 37°2′16.93″N 113°38′14.85″W
- Translators: 93.1 K226BQ (St. George); 97.1 K246CX (St. George)

Links
- Public license information: Public file; LMS
- Webcast: Listen live
- Website: patriotutah.com

KSGO (1450 AM) is a radio station broadcasting a conservative talk radio format to the St. George, Utah, United States, area. The station is owned by Canyon Media Corporation.

== History ==
The 1450 kHz frequency was home to KDXU from 1956 until 1985. In September 1985, KDXU switched its radio frequency to 890 kHz and increased power to 10,000 watts.

KDXU broadcast engineer and local cable-TV owner Ray Carpenter filed for a new radio station on 1450 kHz, which was granted by the Federal Communications Commission (FCC); KATJ began operating with an adult contemporary music format in December using the former KDXU transmitter. The new station took its call sign from Carpenter's six grandchildren: Kelly, Amy, Traci, Troy, Jared and Joel.

In November 1986, former Bonneville International executives Joseph A. Kjar, Donald Bybee and Blaine W. Whipple, organizing as Color Country Broadcasting, purchased the station from Carpenter, changing the call sign to KDLX "DeLux Radio" on January 1, 1987. KDLX moved immediately to new studio facilities Kjar, Whipple, and Bybee sold the station in November 1988 to Las Vegas broadcaster Jack London (Paul G. Maziar) who subsequently filed bankruptcy. London's partner in the purchase was veteran broadcast executive E. Morgan Skinner, Jr., a former Bonneville employee. The two sought to change the station's call sign to KSLI, for their consulting venture, Skinner and London, Inc. The change, which went into effect on November 16, drew the ire of Bonneville for being too close to its KSL radio and television stations in Salt Lake City; Bonneville threatened action against the station and ordered it to stop using the KSLI call sign by November 29. To avoid legal costs, London and Skinner acquiesced and changed the call sign to KSGI.

On New Year's Eve 1988, the Quail Creek Reservoir Dam near Hurricane broke, sending a 4-meter (13 ft) wall of water down the Virgin River and causing over US$11 million of damage to houses, farms, roads and utilities, including KSGI, whose transmitter site was located near the river in St. George. The dam breach destroyed the transmitter building and tower site, sending parts of the transmitter downstream nearly 10 kilometers (6.2 mi) Skinner put the station back to the air within two weeks, with the assistance of Las Vegas broadcaster Steve Gold, Las Vegas-based tower builder Dennis Todd and Las Vegas broadcast engineer Patrick O'Gara. In addition, the group bought the bankrupt KCCZ television station in 1993 and returned it to air as KSGI-TV.

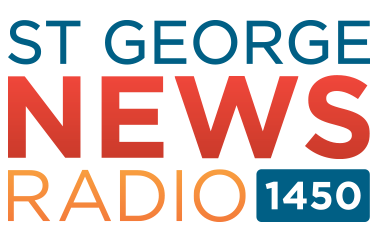
Former logo as of 2020

Skinner sold the station, together with KZEZ 99.9 FM, which Skinner built with partner Lavon Randall, to Simmons Media Group of St. George in 1998. Simmons operated KSGI under an LMA, changing the call sign to KTSP "Total Sports" in 1998 and again to KZNU in 2001. Simmons was unsuccessful at getting FCC approval of the purchase, resulting from multiple ownership issues, and partnered with M. Kent Frandsen to organize Canyon Media Corporation, of which Western Broadcasting, LLC (Simmons) retained a thirty-percent (30%) non-attributable interest. Canyon Media Corporation acquired KZNU and KZEZ in 2005; the latter is currently broadcasting country music with the call letters KONY.

The station changed its call sign to KSGO on June 15, 2023.

== Translators ==
| Call sign | Frequency | City of license | FID | ERP (W) | Class | Transmitter coordinates | FCC info |
|---|---|---|---|---|---|---|---|
| K226BQ | 93.1 FM | St. George, Utah | 86757 | 250 | D | 37°3′49″N 113°34′21″W | LMS |
| K246CX | 97.1 FM | St. George, Utah | 201569 | 250 | D | 36°50′59″N 113°29′34″W | LMS |
