= KZHK =

- St. George, Utah; United States
- Broadcast area: St. George, Utah
- Frequency: 95.9 MHz (HD Radio)
- Branding: 95.9 The Hawk

Programming
- Format: Classic rock
- Affiliations: Westwood One; United Stations Radio Networks

Ownership
- Owner: Canyon Media; (M. Kent Frandsen)
- Sister stations: KAZZ, KCLS, KONY, KPLD, KSGO, KZEZ

History
- First air date: 1992-08-21 (as KVYS)
- Former call signs: KVYS (1992–1997)

Technical information
- Licensing authority: FCC
- Facility ID: 40519
- Class: C
- ERP: 70,000 watts
- HAAT: 595 meters (1,952 ft)
- Transmitter coordinates: 36°50′49″N 113°29′28″W
- Translators: 95.3 K237GA (St. George); 98.7 K254BX (Milford); 99.5 K258AA (Parowan); 104.7 K284BU (Parowan)
- Repeater: 105.1 KPLD-HD3 (Kanab)

Links
- Public license information: Public file; LMS
- Webcast: Listen live
- Website: 959thehawk.com

KZHK (95.9 FM) is a radio station broadcasting a classic rock format. Licensed to St. George, Utah, United States, the station is currently owned by Canyon Media.

== History ==
The station went on the air as KVYS on 1992-08-21. On 1997-01-20, the station changed its call sign to the current KZHK.

Former logo

Previous logo

== Translators ==
KZHK also broadcasts on the following translators:

Broadcast translators for KZHK
Call sign	Frequency	City of license	FID	ERP (W)	Class	FCC info
K237GA	95.3 FM	St. George, Utah	157333	250	D	LMS
K254BX	98.7 FM	Milford, Utah	140889	10	D	LMS
K258AA	99.5 FM	Parowan, Utah	51699	19	D	LMS
K284BU	104.7 FM	Parowan, Utah	142303	16	D	LMS
