= KCLS (FM) =

Soft adult contemporary radio station in Leeds–St. George, Utah

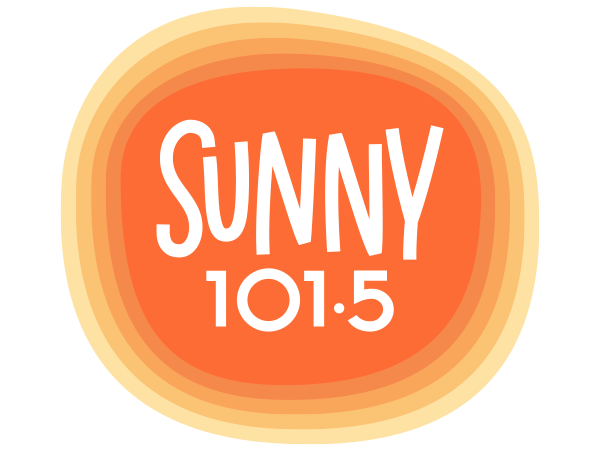
- Leeds, Utah; United States
- Broadcast area: St. George, Utah
- Frequency: 101.5 MHz (HD Radio)
- Branding: Sunny 101.5

Programming
- Format: Classic hits; soft adult contemporary
- Subchannels: HD2: Active rock "96X"; HD3: Spanish adult hits "Juan 106 FM"

Ownership
- Owner: Canyon Media Group, LLC
- Sister stations: KAZZ; KONY; KPLD; KSGO; KZEZ; KZHK

History
- First air date: 1986 (as KELY-FM at 101.7)
- Former call signs: KELY-FM (1987–1998)
- Former frequencies: 101.7 MHz (1986–?)

Technical information
- Licensing authority: FCC
- Facility ID: 55461
- Class: C3
- ERP: 40,000 watts
- HAAT: 620 meters (2,030 ft)
- Transmitter coordinates: 36°50′59″N 113°29′28″W
- Translators: HD2: 96.3 K242BV (St. George); HD3: 106.5 K293CU (St. George); HD3: 106.9 K295CY (St. George)
- Repeater: 105.1 KPLD-HD4 (Kanab)

Links
- Public license information: Public file; LMS
- Webcast: Listen live; HD2: Listen live; HD3: Listen live
- Website: mysunny1015.com; HD2: rockstgeorge.com; HD3: Listen live

KCLS (101.5 MHz) is an FM radio station licensed to Leeds, Utah. The station is owned by Canyon Media Group, LLC. The station airs a classic hits/soft adult contemporary format, playing songs from the 1970s, 1980s, and 1990s.

The station was assigned the KCLS call letters by the Federal Communications Commission on July 13, 1998.

KCLS-HD2 airs an active rock format branded as "96X", which is also heard on 96.3 FM, through a translator in St. George, Utah. KCLS-HD3 airs a Spanish adult hits format branded as "Juan 106 FM", which is also heard on 106.5 FM and 106.9 FM, through translators in St. George.

On March 25, 2019, Easy 101.5 rebranded as Sunny 101.5.

== Translators ==
Call sign	Frequency	City of license	FID	ERP (W)	HAAT	Class	FCC info	Notes
K226BQ	93.1 FM	St. George, Utah	86757	99	82 m (269 ft)	D	LMS	
K242BV	96.3 FM	St. George, Utah	158438	195	50.7 m (166 ft)	D	LMS	Relays HD2
K293CU	106.5 FM	St. George, Utah	157262	99	547 m (1,795 ft)	D	LMS	Relays HD3
K295CY	106.9 FM	St. George, Utah	157980	250	1,021 m (3,350 ft)	D	LMS	Relays HD3
