= Red Cliffs Mall =

Coordinates: 37.1160479°N 113.5475048°W

- Location: St. George, Utah, United States
- Opened: Summer of 1990; 36 years ago
- Developer: Price Development Company
- Manager: GGP
- Owner: Brookfield Properties
- Num. of stores: 60+
- Num. of anchor tenants: 5
- Floor area: 449,294 square feet (41,740.8 m^{2})
- Floors: 1

Red Cliffs Mall is a shopping mall in St. George, Utah, United States that opened in 1990. It is the only major indoor shopping center between Las Vegas, Nevada and the Wasatch Front, located on Red Cliffs Drive, adjacent to Interstate 15. Managed by Brookfield Properties, the mall features Dillard's, JCPenney, Barnes & Noble, AL's Sporting Goods, and H&M as its anchor stores as well as 60-plus major retailers. Newer tenants as of 2025 include Sixteen and Not Enough Nelsons sweets & donuts shop.

== History ==
The original anchors were JCPenney, ZCMI, and Walmart, with Sears joining in 1998. Red Cliffs Cinemas, a 4 screen movie theater, opened on an outparcel of the mall in November 1995. In April 2001, Dillard's took over the ZCMI location, and relocated to the former Walmart space after Walmart vacated the mall in 2002 to relocate to a new supercenter. Barnes & Noble opened in 2008 in the former ZCMI space. The movie theater closed in 2016 and was demolished in 2023. Sears closed in 2017. A large H&M store opened in the fall of 2018. AL's Sporting Goods opened in the former Sears space in 2023. Sixteen Apparel shop opened in 2024. Not Enough Nelsons sweets & donuts shop opened in 2025.
