= KCIN =

- Cedar City, Utah; United States
- Frequency: 94.9 MHz
- Branding: Cat Country 107.3/94.9

Programming
- Format: Country
- Affiliations: Compass Media Networks

Ownership
- Owner: Townsquare Media; (Townsquare License, LLC)
- Sister stations: KDXU, KDXU-FM, KIYK, KREC, KSUB, KXBN

History
- First air date: May 10, 1974 (as KBRE-FM)
- Former call signs: KBRE-FM (1974–2001); KXBN (2001–2006)

Technical information
- Licensing authority: FCC
- Facility ID: 35392
- Class: C1
- ERP: 55,000 watts
- HAAT: −37 meters (−121 ft)
- Transmitter coordinates: 37°38′43″N 113°22′22″W
- Translators: 96.7 K244CR (Rural Garfield County); 99.3 K257AG (Panguitch); 103.7 K279BN (St. George)
- Repeater: 107.3 KIYK (St. George)

Links
- Public license information: Public file; LMS
- Webcast: Listen live
- Website: catcountryutah.com

KCIN (94.9 FM) is a radio station broadcasting a country music format. Licensed to Cedar City, Utah, United States, the station is currently owned by Townsquare Media.

== History ==
The station went on the air as KBRE-FM on May 10, 1974. It was owned by New Era Broadcasting Company. On May 29, 2001, the station changed its call sign to KXBN, and on September 1, 2006, to the current KCIN.

These call letters were used from 1961 until 1995 in Victorville, California.

On January 1, 2020, the stations changed their branding from "Big Kickin' Country" to "107.3/94.9 New Country".

On October 10, 2022, the stations rebranded as "Cat Country 107.3/94.9".
