= KCSG =

Television station in Cedar City, Utah

KCSG and K18OI-D
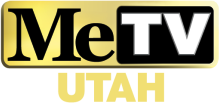

KCSG: Cedar City–St. George, Utah; K18OI-D: Ogden–Salt Lake City, Utah; United States
- Channels for KCSG: Digital: 14 (UHF); Virtual: 8
- Channels for K18OI-D: Digital: 18 (UHF); Virtual: 8
- Branding: MeTV Utah

Programming
- Affiliations: 8.1: MeTV; for others, see § Technical information and subchannels

Ownership
- Owner: Weigel Broadcasting; (KCSG-TV LLC)

History
- First air date: KCSG: April 23, 1990
- Former call signs: KCSG: KCCZ (1990–1993); KSGI-TV (1993–February 1998); KXIV (February–May 1998); K18OI-D: K68GP (2006–2009); K68GP-D (2009); KQTI-LD (2009–2020); KCSG-LD (2020–2026)
- Former channel number: KCSG: Analog: 4 (VHF, 1990–2009); Virtual: 14 (2009–2016); K18OI-D: Analog: 68 (UHF, 2006–2009); Digital: 31 (UHF, 2009–2024)
- Former affiliations: KCSG: Independent (1990–1992, 1994–1998); Dark (1992–1994); Pax TV (1998–2005); America One (2005–2008); MyNetworkTV (2008–2011); MeTV (2011–2014); Heroes & Icons (2014–2018); K18OI-D: America One, Youtoo America, NewsNet
- Call sign meaning: Cedar City St. George

Technical information
- Licensing authority: FCC
- Facility ID: KCSG: 59494; K18OI-D: 130912
- Class: K18OI-D: LD
- ERP: KCSG: 25 kW; K18OI-D: 15 kW
- HAAT: KCSG: 368 m (1,207 ft); K18OI-D: 1,110 m (3,642 ft)
- Transmitter coordinates: KCSG: 37°38′22.5″N 113°1′58.9″W; K18OI-D: 40°40′56″N 112°12′12″W
- Translator: see § Other translators

Links
- Public license information: KCSG: Public file; LMS; K18OI-D: Public file; LMS
- Website: KCSG page on MeTV website

KCSG (channel 8) is a television station licensed to Cedar City, Utah, United States, airing programming from the classic television network MeTV. Owned by Weigel Broadcasting, it broadcasts from a main transmitter on Cedar Mountain, southeast of Cedar City. The station is rebroadcast on the Wasatch Front by K18OI-D, licensed to Ogden and transmitting from Farnsworth Peak in the Oquirrh Mountains, and on additional translators in Utah.

Channel 4 in Cedar City spent most of its history as a station with local programming for Southern Utah. It was built by Michael Glen Golden as KCCZ, which began broadcasting on April 23, 1990, as an independent station with studios in Cedar City. Golden ran out of money in 1992, causing the station to leave the air. Seagull Communications, which owned radio stations in St. George, acquired the station out of bankruptcy and returned it to the air as KSGI-TV in 1994. Bonneville International Corporation, the owner of KSL-TV in Salt Lake City, acquired the station in 1998. It was relaunched under new KCSG call letters and served as an affiliate of Pax.

Broadcast West acquired KCSG in 2002, beginning a 14-year ownership tenure for KCSG under car dealer Stephen Wade. Wade launched a news department for KCSG in 2003, which was shuttered in 2010 due to poor advertising support. Local news was revived through an agreement with Dixie State College, which briefly managed the station. KCSG converted to digital broadcasting in 2009 and began using virtual channel 16. After being a MyNetworkTV affiliate beginning in 2008, KCSG's main channel began broadcasting MeTV in 2011 before switching to Heroes & Icons in 2014. West American Finance Corporation acquired KCSG in 2016 and switched its virtual channel to 8. In 2017, the station was acquired by Weigel directly.

== History ==
=== KCCZ and KSGI-TV: Early years ===
On June 11, 1984, the Federal Communications Commission (FCC) issued a construction permit to Michael Glen Golden of Parowan, Utah, for a new commercial TV station to broadcast on channel 4. Golden believed that Southern Utah's growth could support a television station. He attempted to secure affiliation or program deals with the major networks and later met with officials from CBS and Turner Broadcasting System but was unsuccessful, leading him to target construction of channel 4 as an independent station. Construction on the transmitter site on Cedar Mountain began in October 1986, with Golden—through his Liberty Broadcasting Company—hoping to have KCCZ on the air by January 1987.

KCCZ began broadcasting on April 23, 1990, from studios on Airport Road in Cedar City. In September 1992, it began offering 12:30, 6:30 and 9:30 p.m. newscasts from KSL-TV featuring dedicated Southern Utah news stories and weather forecasts. However, the station was suffering financially. Over the course of 1992, five liens were filed against Liberty Broadcasting Company property for failure to pay federal taxes. In early November, the station abruptly shut down, after which time Golden was assessed a civil tax penalty of more than $22,000.

KCCZ was sold at bankruptcy in September 1993 to Seagull Communications Corporation, which won the bidding for $75,000. Seagull's principals owned St. George radio station KSGI (1450 AM) and were building KSGI-FM 99.7 at the time. The station resumed broadcasting as KSGI-TV either in January 1994 or on February 1. It maintained the Cedar City studio and opened another on North 1000 East and broadcast a family-friendly independent station format with local programming and a package of Colorado Rockies baseball games.

=== KCSG: Local TV for Southern Utah ===
The Bonneville International Corporation, a broadcasting company wholly owned by the Church of Jesus Christ of Latter-day Saints and owner of KSL-TV, acquired KSGI-TV from Seagull in 1997. The station changed its call sign to KXIV by the time Bonneville completed the purchase in April 1998. The call sign was changed again to KCSG before Bonneville relaunched the station as an affiliate of Pax on October 12, 1998. Pax had only gone on the air that August. The station maintained studios in Cedar City but had its offices in St. George. Station leadership stated plans to eventually produce a local newscast, but by 2000 the only local newscasts on the station's schedule were rebroadcasts from KSL-TV. Under Bonneville, KCSG also offered some local college sports, including Dixie College and Southern Utah University athletics.

In August 2002, KCSG was sold to Broadcast West, a St. George-based partnership of general manager Dan Matheson and local auto dealer Stephen Wade, for $450,000. The new owners elected to continue the Pax affiliation and to increase local programming. Among the company's moves was to implement a news department, which launched in 2003. By 2005, KCSG was offering a nightly newscast as well as a newscast in Spanish three times a week. The Broadcast West partnership was dissolved on October 18, 2005, and a new company—Southwest Media, owned by Stephen Wade—became the licensee.

KCSG replaced Salt Lake City's KJZZ-TV as Utah's MyNetworkTV affiliate on August 18, 2008. By this time, KCSG was producing local news on weekdays from 7 to 8 a.m., 5:30 to 6 p.m., and 9 to 10 p.m. and a local sports program, Sports Jam, airing three nights a week. The station added programming from the Retro Television Network, which was previously carried in the market by KUSG and KCBU, in July 2009. KCSG ceased analog broadcasting with the digital television transition on June 12, 2009. It continued to broadcast its main digital signal from Cedar City on UHF channel 14. Its translator in St. George, which converted at the same time, operated on channel 16, which became the virtual channel number for the station in lieu of 4.

In September 2009, the format of KCSG's nightly newscast changed when production of the program, except for anchoring, was outsourced to Dixie State College, with students producing the newscast at the college's studio. After this and other attempts by Wade to cut costs did not stop the newscast from losing money, KCSG ceased airing local news in February 2010.

In August 2010, Wade signed a local marketing agreement with Dixie State College's Dick Nourse Center for Media Innovation to program the station. This included the return of a news presence on August 23, with 15-minute newscasts recorded on weekdays. After seven months, Southwest Media resumed managing KCSG, but the Center for Media Innovation continued to supply the station with news and sports programming. Later in 2011, KCSG began offering re-airs of selected KSL-TV newscasts and daily weather forecasts from KSL. It also signed a deal to air Utah State University football and men's and women's basketball games.

=== MeTV and Weigel purchase ===
KCSG logo used 2011-2017

On September 5, 2011, KCSG switched its primary affiliation to MeTV, a diginet specializing in classic television programming. In 2014, it switched diginets from MeTV to Heroes & Icons, which like MeTV is owned by Weigel Broadcasting.

West American Finance Corporation acquired KCSG in 2016 and rebranded it using virtual channel 8. The station also launched an 8 p.m. newscast, lasting eight minutes in length, continuing the Heroes & Icons affiliation.

Weigel Broadcasting acquired KCSG and its translators in St. George from West American Finance for $1.1 million in 2017. The transaction marked the beginning of Weigel purchasing stations outside of its traditional Midwest markets, as before the end of 2017, it had agreed to acquire stations serving Los Angeles, St. Louis, San Francisco, and Seattle. In 2020, it acquired KUTA-LD in Logan and KQTI-LD, licensed to Ogden, from Airwaves Inc. to rebroadcast KCSG. On February 23, 2026, an FCC rule change required stations licensed as broadcast translators and not low-power TV stations, including KCSG-LD, to be assigned translator-type call signs. As a result, this station was changed to K18OI-D.

== Technical information and subchannels ==
KCSG is broadcast from a main transmitter on Cedar Mountain, southeast of Cedar City. The K18OI-D transmitter is located on Farnsworth Peak in the Oquirrh Mountains. The stations' signals are multiplexed:

Subchannels of KCSG and K18OI-D
Subchannel	Res.	Short name	Programming
8.1	720p	MeTV	MeTV
8.2	480i	CATCHY	Catchy Comedy
8.3	480i	START	Start TV
8.4	480i	HEROES	Heroes & Icons
8.5	480i	WEST	WEST
8.6	480i	STORY	Story Television
8.7	480i	MOVIES	Movies!
8.8	480i	TOONS	MeTV Toons
8.9	480i	DABL	Dabl
8.10	480i	MeTV+	MeTV+

=== Other translators ===
KCSG's signal is additionally rebroadcast over the following translators:

- Beaver: K25PF-D
- Delta–Oak City: K25PF-D
- Fillmore–Meadow: K25JJ-D
- Garrison: K30PI-D
- Leamington: K16MT-D
- Logan: K08QL-D, K22MH-D
- Minersville: K17HX-D
- Parowan–Enoch: K25PD-D
- St. George: K16DS-D, K27MQ-D
