= KOBY =

Radio station in Cedar City, Utah (1971–2012)

Cedar City, Utah; United States
- Broadcast area: Cedar City / St. George, Utah
- Frequency: 940 kHz

Programming
- Format: Defunct (was Oldies); License deleted

History
- First air date: 1971
- Former call signs: KBRE (1971–2001); KNNZ (2001–2009)

Technical information
- Facility ID: 35391
- Class: D
- Power: 10,000 watts day 39 watts night
- Transmitter coordinates: 37°45′51″N 113°6′15″W

KOBY (940 AM) was an American radio station broadcasting an Oldies format. It was licensed to Cedar City, Utah.

The license and the callsign have been deleted by the U.S. Federal Communications Commission.

== History ==
The station used to be known as KBRE, and then KNNZ, beginning on May 25, 2001. On February 24, 2009, while off air, the station changed its call sign to KOBY.

On May 29, 2009, the Fifth District Court of Utah in Washington County, Utah, appointed a receiver to take over KOBY for US Capital, Incorporated of Boulder, Colorado, an investment group which foreclosed on Legecy Media, the owners of KOBY and several other stations. The receiver turned the license in to the FCC and requested it be canceled pursuant to court approval. It was cancelled on November 9, 2012.
