= KREC =

- Brian Head, Utah; United States
- Broadcast area: St. George, Utah
- Frequency: 98.1 MHz
- Branding: Star 98

Programming
- Format: Adult contemporary
- Affiliations: Premiere Networks; Skyview Networks

Ownership
- Owner: Townsquare Media; (Townsquare License, LLC)
- Sister stations: KCIN, KDXU, KDXU-FM, KIYK, KSUB, KXBN

History
- First air date: November 14, 1988

Technical information
- Licensing authority: FCC
- Facility ID: 6784
- Class: C
- ERP: 56,000 watts
- HAAT: 770 meters (2,530 ft)
- Transmitter coordinates: 37°32′30″N 113°4′8″W
- Translators: 96.5 K243AG (Parowan); 98.5 K253BB (St. George)

Links
- Public license information: Public file; LMS
- Webcast: Listen live
- Website: star981.com

KREC (98.1 FM) is a radio station broadcasting an adult contemporary format. Licensed to Brian Head, Utah, United States, the station serves the St. George area. It was built by Pam and Jeff Johnston and went on air in November 1988. They sold it in July 1999. The station is owned by Townsquare Media and features programming from Premiere Networks.

== Translators ==
Call sign	Frequency	City of license	FID	ERP (W)	HAAT	Class	Transmitter coordinates	FCC info
K243AG	96.5 FM	Parowan, Utah	29189	70	199 m (653 ft)	D	37°50′31.9″N 112°58′12.8″W	LMS
K253BB	98.5 FM	St. George, Utah	6785	90	26.4 m (87 ft)	D	37°3′49.2″N 113°34′27.9″W	LMS
