= KPLD =

- Kanab, Utah; United States
- Broadcast area: St. George, Utah
- Frequency: 105.1 MHz (HD Radio)
- Branding: PLANET 105.1

Programming
- Format: Hot adult contemporary
- Subchannels: HD2: KONY simulcast HD3: KZHK simulcast HD4: KCLS simulcast

Ownership
- Owner: Canyon Media; (Canyon Media Group, L.L.C.)
- Sister stations: KONY, KZHK, KCLS, KSGO, KAZZ, KZEZ

History
- First air date: 1984-02-21 (as KKHK)
- Former call signs: KKHK (1984–1985); KCKK (1985–1992); KONY-FM (1992–2002); KEOT (2002–2002); KHUL (2002–2003)

Technical information
- Licensing authority: FCC
- Facility ID: 55399
- Class: C
- ERP: 100,000 watts
- HAAT: 600 meters (2,000 ft)
- Transmitter coordinates: 37°17′45″N 112°50′34″W
- Translators: 95.5 K238BO (Cedar City); 96.9 K245BF (Cedar City); 98.5 K253BU (Cedar City); 101.1 K266BR (Cedar City)
- Repeaters: 105.1 KPLD-FM1 (Cedar City); 105.1 KPLD-FM2 (St. George, CP)

Links
- Public license information: Public file; LMS
- Webcast: Listen Live
- Website: myplanet1051.com

KPLD (105.1 FM) is a radio station broadcasting a hot adult contemporary format. Licensed to Kanab, Utah, United States, the station serves the St. George, Utah area. The station is currently owned by Canyon Media.

== History ==
The station went on the air as KKHK on 1984-02-21. On 1985-07-01, the station changed its call sign to KCKK, on 1992-11-23 to KONY-FM, on 2002-02-04 to KEOT, on 2002-02-15 to KHUL, and on 2003-04-09 to the current KPLD.

On January 17, 2012, KPLD moved from 94.1 FM to 105.1 FM.

The station features an on-air lineup of morning duo Lukas and LaRae, McCall in mid-days, Cindy in afternoons, and Kaden at night.

In July 2018, KPLD rebranded as "Planet 105.1".

On March 23, 2023, They stop broadcasting on the 94.1 FM radio channel.
