= KSUB =

Radio station in Cedar City, Utah

- Cedar City, Utah; United States
- Frequency: 590 kHz
- Branding: News Radio 107.3-590

Programming
- Format: News/talk
- Affiliations: Fox News Radio; Premiere Networks; Westwood One

Ownership
- Owner: Townsquare Media; (Townsquare License, LLC)
- Sister stations: KCIN, KDXU, KDXU-FM, KIYK, KREC, KXBN

History
- First air date: July 4, 1937
- Former frequencies: 1310 kHz (1937–1941); 1340 kHz (1941–1950)
- Call sign meaning: "Southern Utah Broadcasting"

Technical information
- Licensing authority: FCC
- Facility ID: 61384
- Class: D
- Power: 5,000 watts (day); 138 watts (night)
- Transmitter coordinates: 37°41′50″N 113°10′59″W
- Translator: 107.3 K297CG (Cedar City)

Links
- Public license information: Public file; LMS
- Webcast: Listen live
- Website: ksub590.com

KSUB (590 AM) is a commercial radio station in Cedar City, Utah, owned by Townsquare Media. It airs a news/talk radio format. The station's offices and studios are on South Main Street.

By day, KSUB is powered at 5,000 watts during the day and 138 watts at night using a non-directional antenna. To protect other stations on 590 AM from interference, KSUB reduces power at night to 138 watts. Programming is also heard on 250-watt FM translator K293CG at 107.3 FM in Cedar City.

== History ==
=== Ties to KSL Salt Lake City ===
On September 22, 1936, Harold Johnson and Leland M. Perry received a construction permit for a new 100-watt radio station to operate on 1310 kHz at Cedar City. The station was originally scheduled to open June 17, 1937, but days before opening, the tower collapsed in a construction accident. The opening had to be postponed until July 4, 1937. Perry took over as sole operator in 1939 when Johnson died. He had been a local dry goods store owner.

A reorganization of KSUB under the Southern Utah Broadcasting Company followed, with Earl L. Glade, general manager of KSL in Salt Lake City, becoming the largest stockholder. The station moved to 1340 kHz in 1941 as part of North American Regional Broadcasting Agreement (NARBA) reallocation. It was authorized in 1944 to increase power to 250 watts.

KSUB's ties to KSL became more concrete in 1944, when the Radio Service Corporation, its licensee, purchased a majority share in the Cedar City outlet. On November 1, the station became a network affiliate of CBS, matching KSL's affiliation.

=== Move to 590 AM ===
In November 1944, KSUB filed to move to 590 kHz, which would be coupled with a boost to 1,000 watts, greatly increasing its coverage area. This was initially OKed in 1946 but did not receive final approval until 1949. The upgrade included a new transmitter site, with two 300-foot (91 m) towers replacing the 100-foot (30 m) antenna previously in use.

The site was separated from the studios and so it needed a telephone link and its own night watchman, complete with on-site apartment. KSUB moved to 590 kHz on March 10, 1950.

=== Changes in ownership ===
In 1957, KSL sold majority control in the Southern Utah Broadcasting Company to a group of four investors. Within a year, they transferred their shares to the Beehive Telecasting Company, which at the time was building an independent television station, KLOR-TV channel 11, in Provo.

The television station venture performed poorly and that affected KSUB. In late 1959, the station was sold to Granite District Radio Broadcasting Company, which owned Salt Lake City's KNAK.

=== Tower problems ===
An FM counterpart to KSUB arrived in 1976, but not before more pre-construction trouble similar to that which had befallen KSUB itself 39 years prior. While the new tower was being put into place, gusty winds tangled the guy lines in the tower, and corrective efforts led to the tower crashing to the ground. After contending with other issues during construction, KSUB-FM the FM station began broadcasting in November 1976.

In 1983, one of the AM station's two towers installed in 1949 was toppled in a wind storm. It was replaced later that year.

=== Country, Standards and Talk ===
In 1984, KSUB flipped from its format of full service adult contemporary music to country music. The AM and FM stations in effect exchanged formats. KSUB 590 retaind the country sound until a brief flip to adult standards in 1988. But that did not last the year.

In 1991, KSUB began its move to its present news/talk format. In middays it began airing The Rush Limbaugh Show. The decision to carry Limbaugh came at a crucial time for the station, which was struggling financially.

=== Cherry Creek and Townsquare ===
More than 35 years of ownership by members of the Johnson family ended in 2005 when KSUB and its four sister stations were sold to Cherry Creek Radio for $5.8 million. That marked Cherry Creek's entrance into the southwestern Utah radio market.

Logo while on the 107.7 translator

KSUB returned to being the flagship station of Southern Utah Thunderbirds athletics in 2020 as part of a new deal with Cherry Creek.

Effective June 17, 2022, Cherry Creek Radio sold KSUB as part of a 42 station/21 translator package to Townsquare Media. The price tag was $18.75 million.
