= KONY (FM) =

Country music radio station in St. George, Utah

- St. George, Utah; United States
- Broadcast area: St. George-Cedar City, Utah
- Frequency: 99.9 MHz (HD Radio)
- Branding: 99.9 KONY Country

Programming
- Format: Country
- Subchannels: HD2: Sports (KAZZ simulcast); HD3: Oldies (KZEZ simulcast)
- Affiliations: Compass Media Networks

Ownership
- Owner: Canyon Media Corporation
- Sister stations: KAZZ; KCLS; KPLD; KSGO; KZEZ; KZHK

History
- First air date: 1994
- Former call signs: KCLG (1991–1992); KFMD (1992–1993); KSGI-FM (1993–1996); KZEZ (1996–1998); KEOT (1998–2002)

Technical information
- Licensing authority: FCC
- Facility ID: 18140
- Class: C
- ERP: 89,000 watts
- HAAT: 600 meters (2,000 ft)
- Transmitter coordinates: 36°50′59″N 113°29′34″W
- Translators: HD2: 99.5 K258DS (St. George); HD3: 102.7 K274CQ (St. George)
- Repeaters: 105.1 KPLD-HD2 (Kanab); 99.5 KUNY (Paragonah)

Links
- Public license information: Public file; LMS
- Webcast: Listen live
- Website: www.999konycountry.com

KONY (99.9 MHz), branded as "99.9 KONY Country", is a country formatted FM radio station broadcasting to the St. George, Cedar City area. The station is owned and operated by Canyon Media.

On-air personalities include Carl LaMar, the return of Marty Lane with Amy Chesley.

== Translators ==
Call sign	Frequency	City of license	FID	ERP (W)	Class	Transmitter coordinates	FCC info	Notes
K274CQ	102.7 FM	St. George, Utah	143400	99	D	37°3′49″N 113°34′21″W	LMS	Relays HD2 (KZEZ)
K258DS	99.5 FM	St. George, Utah	58260	250	D	36°50′59″N 113°29′34″W	LMS	Relays HD3 (KAZZ)
