= KIYK =

Simulcast of KCIN Cedar City
- St. George, Utah; United States
- Broadcast area: St. George; Colorado City, Arizona; Mesquite, Nevada
- Frequency: 107.3 MHz
- Branding: Cat Country 107.3/94.9

Programming
- Format: Country
- Affiliations: Compass Media Networks

Ownership
- Owner: Townsquare Media; (Townsquare License, LLC)
- Sister stations: KCIN, KDXU, KDXU-FM, KREC, KSUB, KXBN

History
- First air date: 1973 (as KDXU-FM at 93.5)
- Former call signs: KDXU-FM (1973–1978); KZEZ (1978–1996); KSNN (1996–2012)
- Former frequencies: 93.5 MHz (1973–2005); 106.1 MHz (2005–2013)

Technical information
- Licensing authority: FCC
- Facility ID: 60457
- Class: C2
- ERP: 2,000 watts
- HAAT: 577 meters (1,893 ft)
- Transmitter coordinates: 36°50′49″N 113°29′28″W
- Translator: 94.9 K235CK (St. George)

Links
- Public license information: Public file; LMS
- Webcast: Listen live
- Website: catcountryutah.com

KIYK (107.3 FM) is an American radio station broadcasting a country music format. Licensed to St. George, Utah, United States, the station is owned by Townsquare Media.

KIYK was granted a U.S. Federal Communications Commission construction permit to move to 107.3 MHz and decrease HAAT to 568.4 meters and the frequency shift took place on July 12, 2013.

On October 10, 2022, KIYK rebranded as "Cat Country 107.3/94.9".
