= KDXU-FM =

Radio station in Colorado City, Arizona–St. George, Utah

Simulcasts KDXU (AM) St. George
- Colorado City, Arizona; United States
- Broadcast area: St. George, Utah
- Frequency: 106.1 MHz (HD Radio)
- Branding: 106.1 KDXU

Programming
- Format: News/talk
- Subchannels: HD2: ESPN Radio (sports); HD3: Fox Sports Radio (sports)
- Network: Fox News Radio
- Affiliations: Compass Media Networks; Premiere Networks; Westwood One; BYU Cougars Sports Network

Ownership
- Owner: Townsquare Media; (Townsquare License, LLC)
- Sister stations: KCIN, KDXU, KIYK, KREC, KSUB, KXBN

History
- First air date: 1992 (as KCCA at 107.3)
- Former call signs: KCCA (1991–2001); KZNZ (2001–2003); KMXM (2003–2006); KXFF (2006–2024)
- Former frequencies: 107.3 MHz (1992–2013)
- Call sign meaning: Dixie Utah

Technical information
- Licensing authority: FCC
- Facility ID: 69623
- Class: C1
- ERP: 35,000 watts
- HAAT: 347 meters (1,138 ft)
- Transmitter coordinates: 37°5′41″N 113°11′6″W
- Translators: 99.1 K256CD (Cedar City, Utah); HD2: 97.7 K249EQ (St. George, Utah); HD3: 101.9 K270BV (St. George, Utah)

Links
- Public license information: Public file; LMS
- Webcast: Listen live; HD2: Listen live; HD3: Listen live
- Website: 890kdxu.com; HD2: sportsradio977.com; HD3: foxsportsutahradio.com

KDXU-FM (106.1 FM) is a radio station broadcasting a news/talk format, in simulcast with KDXU (890 AM). Licensed to Colorado City, Arizona, United States, the station is owned by Townsquare Media.

== History ==
The station was assigned the call sign KCCA on May 31, 1991. On April 25, 2001, the station changed its call sign to KZNZ, on February 18, 2003, to KMXM, and on September 20, 2006, to KXFF.

As of March 30, 2012, the station dropped its oldies format to become a simulcast of sister station KHKR, an ESPN Radio affiliate.

Logo as 101.9 & 99.1 Dave FM

On January 1, 2017, KXFF changed their format from classic country to adult hits, branded as "101.9 & 99.1 Dave FM". On December 5, 2022, it was announced that KXFF changed its format from adult hits to sports, branded as "Fox Sports Radio Utah".

The call sign was changed to KDXU-FM on November 20, 2024; the following month, the station began simulcasting the news/talk format of KDXU. Sports programming continues to be carried on KDXU-FM's HD Radio subchannels and on translator stations, with KDXU-FM HD2 and 97.7 K249EQ carrying the ESPN Radio programming formerly heard on KHKR (which concurrently shut down), and KDXU-FM HD3 and 101.9 K270BV continuing KXFF's previous Fox Sports Radio programming.
