= KDXU (AM) =

- St. George, Utah; United States
- Broadcast area: Southern Utah
- Frequency: 890 kHz
- Branding: 106.1 KDXU

Programming
- Format: Talk radio
- Affiliations: Fox News Radio; Premiere Networks; Westwood One

Ownership
- Owner: Townsquare Media; (Townsquare License, LLC)
- Sister stations: KCIN, KDXU-FM, KIYK, KREC, KSUB, KXBN

History
- First air date: July 3, 1957
- Call sign meaning: Dixie Utah

Technical information
- Licensing authority: FCC
- Facility ID: 60454
- Class: D
- Power: 25,000 watts day 108 watts night
- Transmitter coordinates: 37°41′51″N 113°10′54.4″W
- Translator: 92.5 K223DI (St. George)
- Repeater: 106.1 KDXU-FM (Colorado City, Arizona)

Links
- Public license information: Public file; LMS
- Webcast: Listen live
- Website: 890kdxu.com

KDXU (890 AM) is a commercial radio station licensed to St. George, Utah, United States. Owned by Townsquare Media, it carries a talk radio format in a simulcast with KDXU-FM (106.1) in Colorado City, Arizona. Studios are on Ridgeview Drive in St. George, and the transmitter is sited on East 2450 South near South 3210 East.

Programming is also heard over low-power FM translator K223DI at 92.5 MHz.

== History ==
KDXU signed on the air on July 3, 1957. It originally broadcast on 1450 kHz. It aired a full-service format of Middle of the Road (MOR) music with news, talk and sports. It was an affiliate of the ABC Information Radio Network.

In 1973, it added an FM station, KDXU-FM (93.5). The FM station aired an automated beautiful music format, playing quarter hour sweeps of soft instrumental music. It later switched its call sign to KZEZ and more recently back to KDXU-FM.

KDXU was only permitted to broadcast at 1,000 watts by day and 250 watts at night, a fraction of its current output. Management wanted to improve its signal. The station's frequency was moved to 890 kHz in September 1985. A three-tower directional antenna was constructed for use from sunset to sunrise. The following year, KDXU and KZEZ were acquired by Simmons Family Media, Inc., based in Salt Lake City. Simmons later sold KDXU to Townsquare Media.

Previous logo

In January 2022, KDXU began simulcasting on FM translator K223DI at 92.5 MHz in St. George. Another simulcast, on KDXU-FM (106.1) in Colorado City, Arizona, was added in December 2024.
