= St. George, Utah =

City in Utah, United States

- City
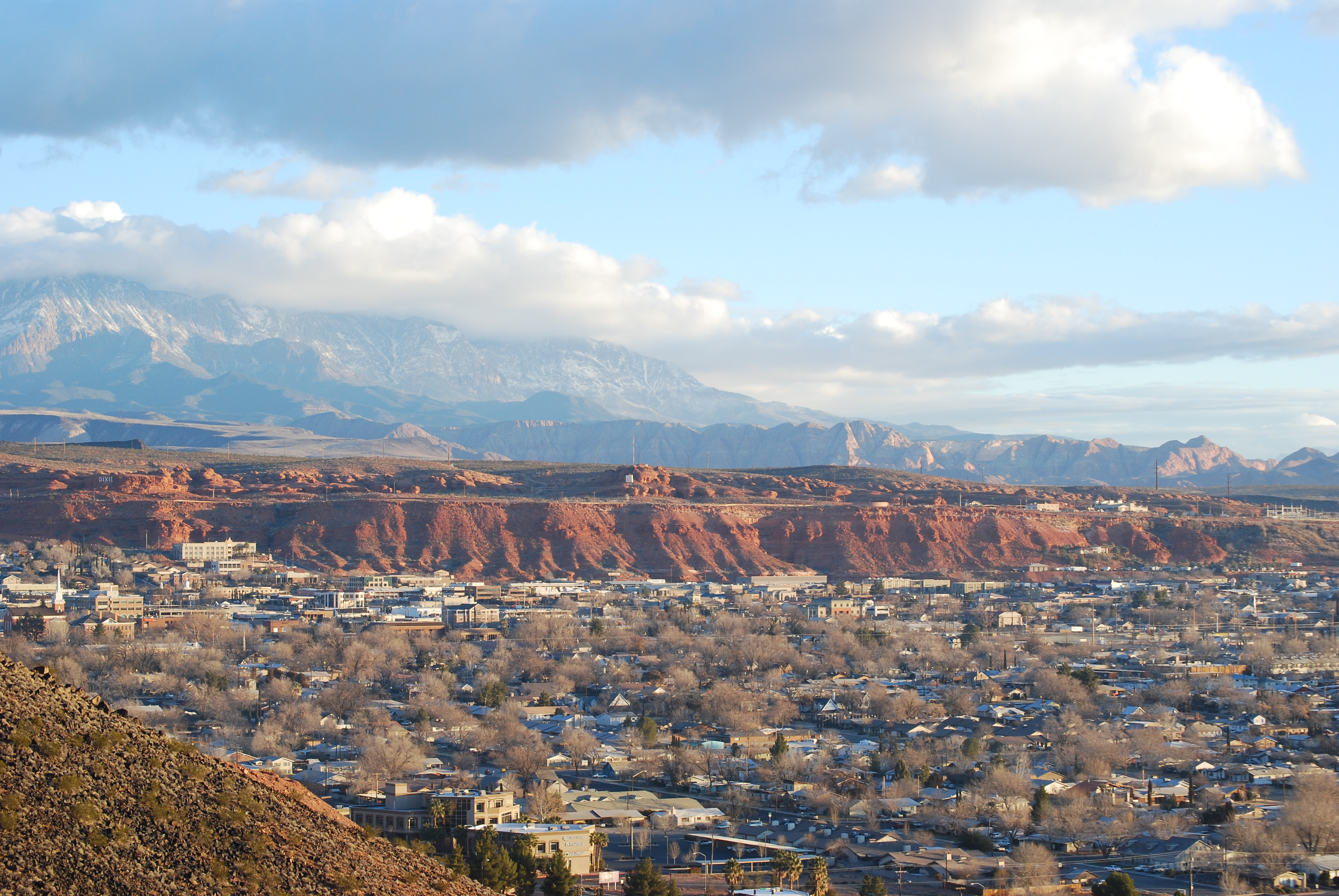
- Overlook of downtown St. George and adjacent Pine Valley Mountains

- Flag Seal
- Nicknames: Utah's Dixie, (the) STG
- Motto: "It's The Brighter Side"
- Interactive map of St. George
- Location within Utah Location within the United States
- Coordinates: 37°6′8.899″N 113°34′37.42″W
- Country: United States
- State: Utah
- County: Washington
- Founded: 1861
- Incorporated: January 17, 1862
- Named for: George A. Smith

Government
  - Type: Mayor–council

Area
  - City: 77.151 sq mi (199.820 km^{2})
  - Land: 77.147 sq mi (199.811 km^{2})
  - Water: 0.029 sq mi (0.076 km^{2}) 0.72%
- Elevation: 2,530 ft (770 m)

Population (2020)
  - City: 95,342
  - Estimate (2024): 106,288
  - Rank: US: 303rd UT: 5th
  - Density: 1,329/sq mi (513.1/km^{2})
  - Urban: 134,109 (US: 255th)
  - Urban density: 2,198/sq mi (848.5/km^{2})
  - Metro: 197,680 (US: 234th)
  - Metro density: 81.4/sq mi (31.44/km^{2})
- Demonym: St. Georgian
- Time zone: UTC–7 (Mountain (MST))
  - Summer (DST): UTC–6 (MDT)
- ZIP Codes: 84770, 84771, 84790, 84791
- Area code: 435
- FIPS code: 49-65330
- GNIS feature ID: 2411757
- Sales tax: 6.75%
- Website: sgcityutah.gov

St. George or Saint George is a city in and the county seat of Washington County, Utah, United States. It is Utah's fifth-most populous city and the largest outside the Wasatch Front, with a population of 95,342 at the 2020 census. The St. George metropolitan statistical area has an estimated 208,000 residents. Located in southwestern Utah on the Arizona-Utah border, it lies in the northeasternmost part of the Mojave Desert, immediately south of the Pine Valley Mountains, which mark the southern boundary of the Great Basin. St. George lies slightly northwest of the Colorado Plateau, which ends at the Hurricane Fault.

St. George was settled in 1861 to be a cotton mission, earning it the nickname of "Dixie". While the crop never became a successful commodity, the area steadily grew in population. Today, the St. George region is known for its somewhat milder climate compared to the rest of the state, outdoor recreation, which includes state parks and Zion National Park. The city has Utah Tech University, an NCAA Division I institution. St. George is 118 miles (190 km) northeast of Las Vegas, Nevada and 300 miles (480 km) south-southwest of Salt Lake City on Interstate 15.

== History ==
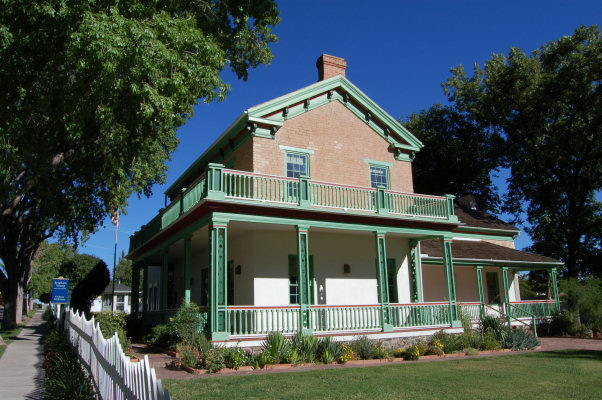
Brigham Young Winter Home and Office in St. George

St. George was founded as part of the cotton mission in 1861 under the direction of Latter Day Saint apostle Erastus Snow. At the outbreak of the American Civil War, Brigham Young accelerated the colonization effort:

Fearing that the war would take away the cotton supply, he began plans for raising enough in this southwestern country to supply the needs of his people. Enough favorable reports had come to him from this warm region below the rim of the Great Basin, that he was convinced cotton could be raised successfully here. At the general church conference in Salt Lake City on October 6th, 1861, about 300 families were "called" to the Dixie mission to promote the cotton industry. Most of the people knew nothing of this expedition until their names were read from the pulpit; but in nearly every case, they responded with good will, and made ready to leave within the month's time allotted to them. The families were selected so as to ensure the communities the right number of farmers, masons, blacksmiths, businessmen, educators, carpenters, as needed.

The settlement was named after George A. Smith, an LDS Church apostle.

In April 1877, the LDS Church completed the St. George Utah Temple. It was the church's third temple and is the oldest still in active use.

The 1992 St. George earthquake destroyed three houses, as well as above- and below-ground utilities, causing about US$1 million in damage.

St. George was the location of the 1997 United States Academic Decathlon national finals.

In January 2005, a 100-year flood occurred throughout the region, due to prolonged heavy rainfall overflowing both the Virgin River and Santa Clara River. One person was killed and 28 homes were destroyed by the Santa Clara River.

=== Nuclear contamination ===
In the early 1950s, St. George received the brunt of the fallout of above-ground nuclear testing at the Yucca Flats/Nevada Test Site northwest of Las Vegas. Winds routinely carried the fallout of these tests directly through St. George and southern Utah. Marked increases in the frequency of cancer in the population, including leukemia, lymphoma, thyroid cancer, breast cancer, melanoma, bone cancer, brain tumors, and gastrointestinal tract cancers, were reported from the mid-1950s until the early 1980s.

In 1980, People magazine reported that from about 220 cast and crew who filmed in a 1956 movie, The Conqueror, on location near St. George, 91 had come down with cancer, and 50 had died from it. Of these, 46 had died of cancer by 1980. Among the cancer deaths were John Wayne, Pedro Armendáriz, and Susan Hayward, the film's stars. But the lifetime odds of developing cancer for men in the U.S. population are 43% and the odds of dying of cancer are 23% (38 and 19%, respectively, for men and women). This places the cancer mortality rate for the 220 primary cast and crew quite near the expected average.

A 1962 United States Atomic Energy Commission report found children living in St. George at the time of the fallout may have received doses to their thyroids of radioiodine as high as 120 to 440 rads (1.2 to 4.4 Gy).

== Geography ==
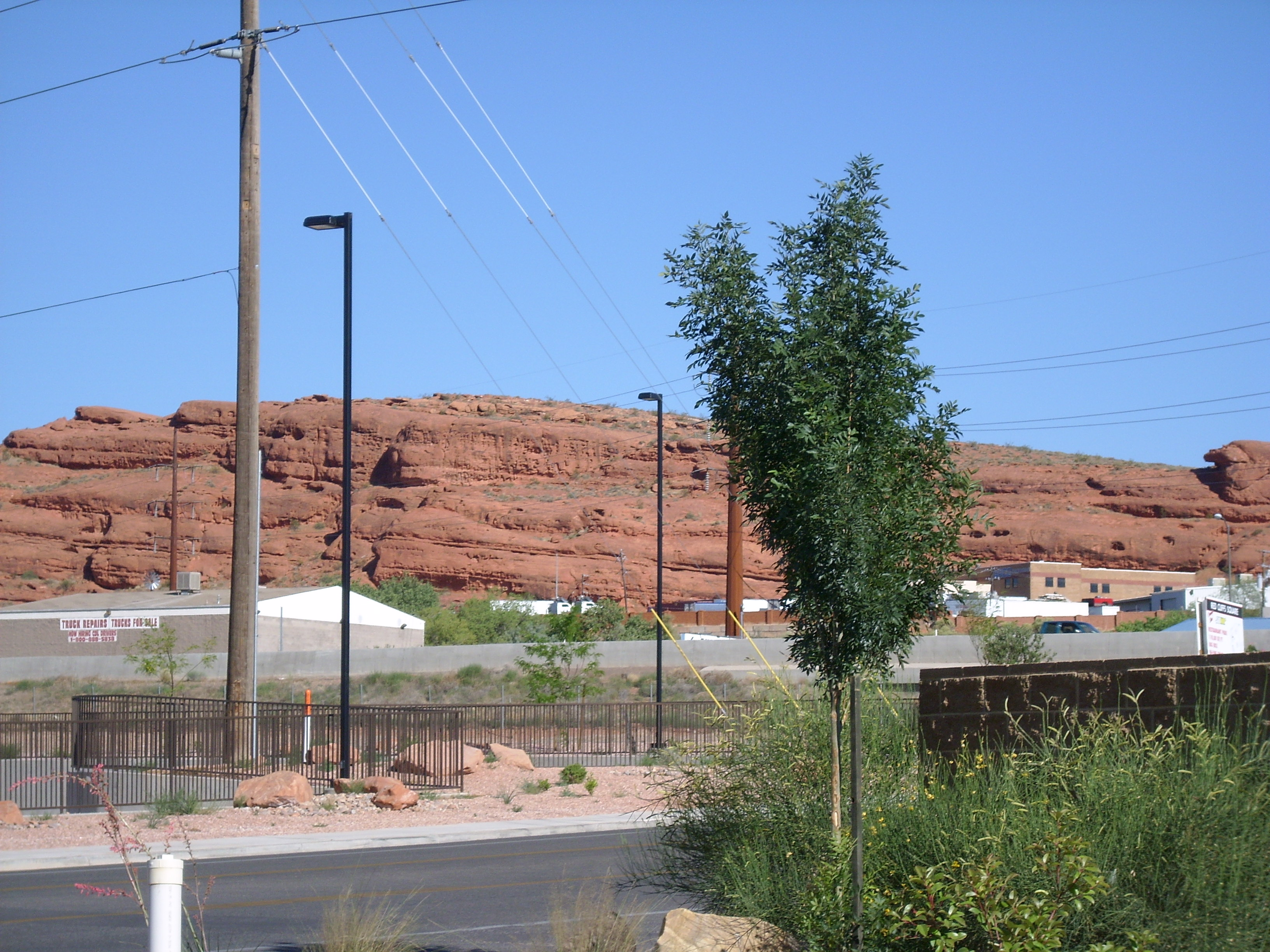
The red hills of the Red Cliffs Desert Reserve north of St. George

According to the United States Census Bureau, the city has an area of 77.151 square miles (199.82 km^{2}), of which 0.003 square miles (0.0078 km^{2}) (0.72% or about 2 ac) is covered by water. St. George is in a desert valley, with most of the city lying below 3,000 feet (900 m) in elevation. It is near a geological transition zone where the Colorado Plateau and Great Basin converge. The Beaver Dam Mountains/Utah Hill lie to the west, the Red Cliffs National Conservation Area and Pine Valley Mountains to the north, the western edge of the Colorado Plateau and Zion National Park to the east, and the Arizona Strip to the south. The Virgin River, the Santa Clara River, and the seasonal Fort Pearce Wash flow through the St. George valley and converge near the western base of Webb Hill near the city center.

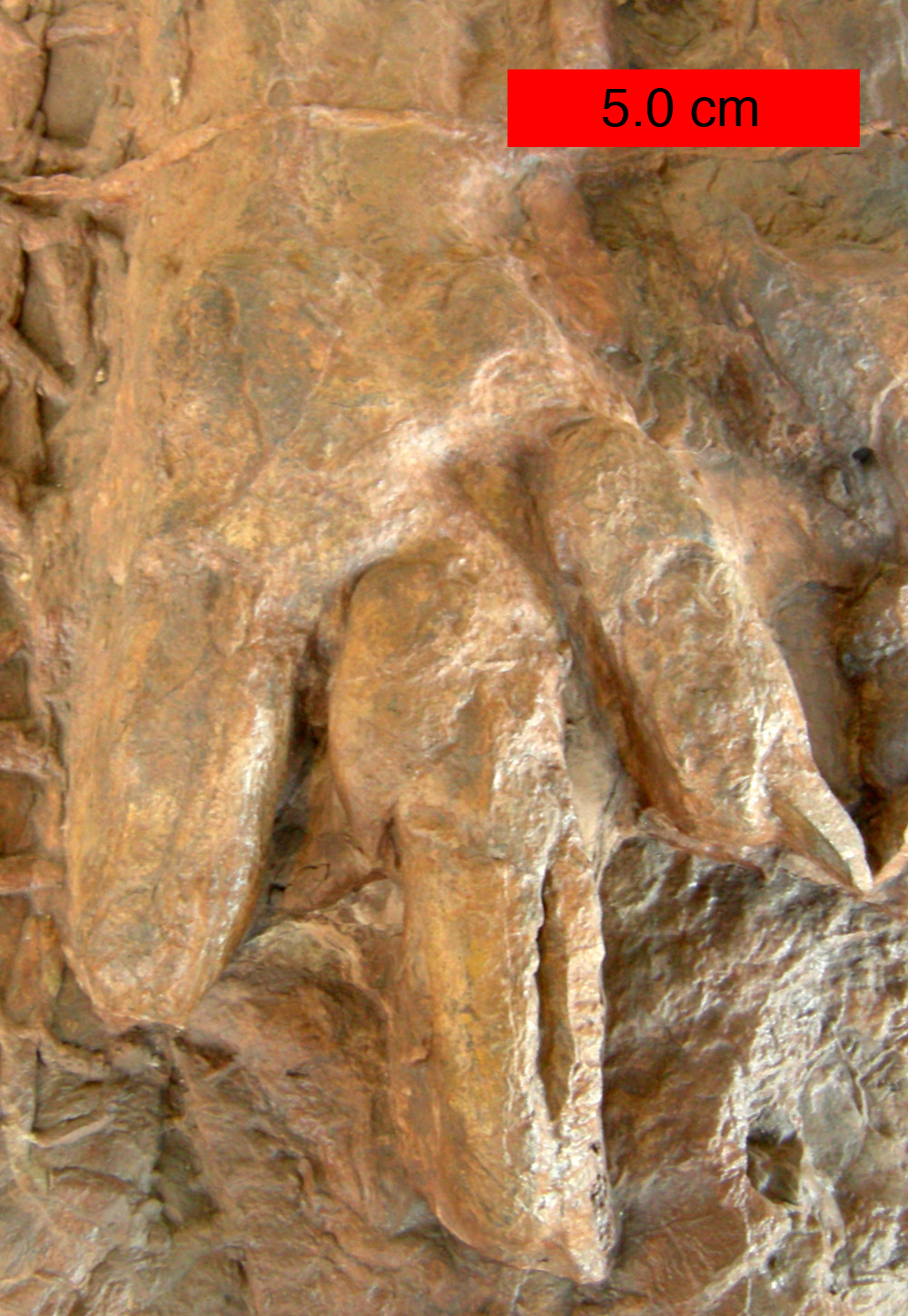
Eubrontes, a dinosaur footprint in the Lower Jurassic Moenave formation at the St. George Dinosaur Discovery Site

The city uses street numbers rather than names, such as "East 100 South". Exceptions have been made for streets with curves or those not fitting into the grid system. Some roads have names along with numerals, such as "400 East", which is also known as "Flood Street".

=== Neighborhoods ===
Some neighborhoods are large housing developments created during the city's rapid modern expansion; others carry the names of geographical features or unincorporated communities that have been annexed by St. George.

- Atkinville (annexed)
- Bloomington (annexed)
- Bloomington Hills
- Bloomington Ranches
- Desert Color
- Desert Hills / Hidden Valley
- Dixie Downs
- Downtown
- Entrada
- Foremaster
- Green Valley
- Price City (formerly Heberville, annexed)
- The Ledges (golf neighborhood)
- Little Valley
- Middleton (annexed, includes Cottonwood)
- Red Cliffs
- Sand Town
- Snow Canyon
- Southgate
- Stone Cliff
- Sunbrook
- Sunriver
- Tonaquint (annexed)

=== Climate ===
St. George's arid climate is significantly warmer on average than the rest of the state, and more closely resembles nearby Las Vegas. The climate is cold arid (BWk), though the average yearly temperature falls around 1 °F below the hot arid classification. St. George has long, hot summers and relatively mild winters. The monthly average temperature ranges from 42.1 °F (5.6 °C) in December to 87.8 °F (31.0 °C) in July. On average, 60 afternoons have high temperatures over 100 °F (38 °C), with an average window of June 29 through August 13, and 122 days with high temperatures over 90 °F (32 °C) with the average window fluctuating between late April and early October. About 60 mornings have low temperature drops to the freezing mark, with the historical average window between November 12 and March 14.

The highest temperature statewide was 118 °F (48 °C), which was recorded in south St. George, near the Arizona border on July 4, 2007, breaking the previous record holder, at 117 °F (47 °C), also set in St. George on July 5, 1985. The record high minimum temperature is 89 °F (32 °C) set on July 15, 1970, and July 3, 2013. Nighttime freezes are common during the winter due to radiational cooling. Both the record low temperature of −11 °F (−24 °C) and record low maximum temperature of 17 °F (−8 °C) were set on January 22, 1937; the record low temperature occurred again on January 26, 1937, both during the record cold month of January 1937 across the Western United States.

The city has abundant sunshine year-round and averages about 300 sunny days per year, with an average 8.80 inches (224 mm) of precipitation annually. The wettest "rain year" has been from July 2004 to June 2005 with at least 15.66 inches (398 mm) (some days were missing) and the driest from July 1973 to June 1974 with 3.89 inches (98.8 mm). Record-breaking widespread flooding occurred during January 2005 when area creeks and rivers far exceeded their banks and washed out homes and some neighborhoods. The wettest month has been January 1993, when 4.74 inches (120 mm) fell. Precipitation is fairly evenly distributed throughout the year, except for a markedly drier period from April through June, which occurs after the Pacific storm season ends, but before the southwest monsoon begins, usually in mid-July. Precipitation mostly comes from the Pacific Ocean from late fall through early spring. The storm track usually lifts north of the city by mid-April. The monsoon brings localized and often intense thunderstorms from early July through mid-September. The greatest rainfall in 24 hours was 2.40 inches (61 mm) on August 31, 1909.

The St. George valley occasionally receives wet or slushy snowfall in the winter, but what accumulates usually melts off by the mid- to late morning; the normal seasonal snowfall is 1.4 inches (3.6 cm). The earliest snowfall was measured on October 29, 1971, and the latest on April 11, 1927. The record single-day snowfall is 10.0 inches (25 cm), which was set on January 5, 1974. With the city having elevations ranging from 2,500 to about 3,500 feet (760 to about 1,070 m), some areas such as Diamond Valley and Winchester Hills typically receive more snowfall and colder temperatures than the rest of the lower valley. The most recent major snow event was on December 8, 2013, when between 6.0 and 8.0 inches (15 and 20 cm) virtually shut down the city, making it the third-heaviest snowfall in the city's history. Also significant about the storm was how low temperatures dropped and remained so for several days with daytime highs failing to reach the freezing mark, and one nighttime low temperature of 1 °F (−17 °C), recorded at the airport, was the coldest in the city in over 100 years. The cold spell killed or severely damaged much of the area's non-native vegetation, such as the Mexican fan palm trees.

Climate data for St. George, Utah, 1991–2020 normals, extremes 1893–present
| Month | Jan | Feb | Mar | Apr | May | Jun | Jul | Aug | Sep | Oct | Nov | Dec | Year |
|---|---|---|---|---|---|---|---|---|---|---|---|---|---|
| Record high °F (°C) | 72 (22) | 84 (29) | 97 (36) | 100 (38) | 108 (42) | 115 (46) | 117 (47) | 113 (45) | 112 (44) | 101 (38) | 88 (31) | 75 (24) | 117 (47) |
| Mean maximum °F (°C) | 64.7 (18.2) | 70.4 (21.3) | 81.0 (27.2) | 90.0 (32.2) | 98.3 (36.8) | 105.6 (40.9) | 110.0 (43.3) | 107.5 (41.9) | 102.9 (39.4) | 92.3 (33.5) | 76.0 (24.4) | 63.9 (17.7) | 110.5 (43.6) |
| Mean daily maximum °F (°C) | 54.0 (12.2) | 59.3 (15.2) | 67.8 (19.9) | 75.0 (23.9) | 85.4 (29.7) | 96.4 (35.8) | 101.9 (38.8) | 99.9 (37.7) | 92.4 (33.6) | 78.8 (26.0) | 63.8 (17.7) | 53.0 (11.7) | 77.3 (25.2) |
| Daily mean °F (°C) | 41.2 (5.1) | 45.8 (7.7) | 53.4 (11.9) | 60.4 (15.8) | 70.5 (21.4) | 80.4 (26.9) | 86.8 (30.4) | 85.1 (29.5) | 76.5 (24.7) | 63.0 (17.2) | 49.2 (9.6) | 40.4 (4.7) | 62.7 (17.1) |
| Mean daily minimum °F (°C) | 28.4 (−2.0) | 32.4 (0.2) | 39.0 (3.9) | 45.7 (7.6) | 55.5 (13.1) | 64.5 (18.1) | 71.7 (22.1) | 70.3 (21.3) | 60.7 (15.9) | 47.3 (8.5) | 34.7 (1.5) | 27.9 (−2.3) | 48.2 (9.0) |
| Mean minimum °F (°C) | 20.7 (−6.3) | 25.1 (−3.8) | 31.3 (−0.4) | 37.8 (3.2) | 44.9 (7.2) | 55.2 (12.9) | 66.4 (19.1) | 64.3 (17.9) | 52.4 (11.3) | 38.0 (3.3) | 27.3 (−2.6) | 20.7 (−6.3) | 18.9 (−7.3) |
| Record low °F (°C) | −11 (−24) | 1 (−17) | 12 (−11) | 18 (−8) | 20 (−7) | 35 (2) | 41 (5) | 43 (6) | 25 (−4) | 20 (−7) | 4 (−16) | −4 (−20) | −11 (−24) |
| Average precipitation inches (mm) | 1.22 (31) | 1.38 (35) | 1.02 (26) | 0.66 (17) | 0.33 (8.4) | 0.16 (4.1) | 0.50 (13) | 1.07 (27) | 0.67 (17) | 0.77 (20) | 0.67 (17) | 0.86 (22) | 9.31 (237.5) |
| Average snowfall inches (cm) | 0.5 (1.3) | 0.5 (1.3) | 0.2 (0.51) | 0.0 (0.0) | 0.0 (0.0) | 0.0 (0.0) | 0.0 (0.0) | 0.0 (0.0) | 0.0 (0.0) | 0.0 (0.0) | 0.0 (0.0) | 0.0 (0.0) | 1.2 (3.11) |
| Average precipitation days (≥ 0.01 in) | 5.4 | 5.7 | 4.5 | 3.2 | 2.9 | 1.2 | 2.8 | 2.9 | 2.3 | 3.4 | 3.0 | 4.5 | 41.8 |
| Average snowy days (≥ 0.1 in) | 0.1 | 0.2 | 0.1 | 0.1 | 0.0 | 0.0 | 0.0 | 0.0 | 0.0 | 0.0 | 0.0 | 0.1 | 0.6 |
Source: NOAA (extremes 1893–present)

== Demographics ==
Historical population
| Census | Pop. | Note | %± |
|---|---|---|---|
| 1870 | 1,142 | | — |
| 1880 | 1,384 | | 21.2% |
| 1890 | 1,377 | | −0.5% |
| 1900 | 1,690 | | 22.7% |
| 1910 | 1,769 | | 4.7% |
| 1920 | 2,271 | | 28.4% |
| 1930 | 2,434 | | 7.2% |
| 1940 | 3,591 | | 47.5% |
| 1950 | 4,562 | | 27.0% |
| 1960 | 5,130 | | 12.5% |
| 1970 | 7,097 | | 38.3% |
| 1980 | 11,350 | | 59.9% |
| 1990 | 28,502 | | 151.1% |
| 2000 | 49,728 | | 74.5% |
| 2010 | 72,897 | | 46.6% |
| 2020 | 95,342 | | 30.8% |
| 2024 (est.) | 106,288 | | 11.5% |
U.S. Decennial Census; 2020 Census

As of the 2015, the largest self-reported ancestry groups in St. George are:

| Largest ancestries (2015) | Percentage |
|---|---|
| English | 28.2% |
| German | 11.3% |
| Irish | 8.5% |
| Danish | 4.6% |
| Swedish | 4.0% |
| Italian | 3.8% |
| Scottish | 3.7% |
| Dutch | 2.4% |
| Norwegian | 1.8% |
| French (except Basque) | 1.8% |
| Swiss | 1.4% |
| Welsh | 1.2% |
| Polish | 1.2% |
| Scots-Irish | 1.0% |

=== Racial and ethnic composition ===
St. George, Utah – Racial and ethnic composition Note: the US Census treats Hispanic/Latino as an ethnic category. This table excludes Latinos from the racial categories and assigns them to a separate category. Hispanics/Latinos may be of any race.
| Race / Ethnicity (NH = Non-Hispanic) | Pop. 2000 | Pop. 2010 | Pop. 2020 | % 2000 | % 2010 | % 2020 |
|---|---|---|---|---|---|---|
| White alone (NH) | 44,215 | 59,722 | 74,860 | 89.03% | 81.93% | 78.52% |
| Black or African American alone (NH) | 110 | 406 | 634 | 0.22% | 0.56% | 0.66% |
| Native American or Alaska Native alone (NH) | 758 | 856 | 956 | 1.53% | 1.17% | 1.00% |
| Asian alone (NH) | 270 | 562 | 1,127 | 0.54% | 0.77% | 1.18% |
| Pacific Islander alone (NH) | 292 | 703 | 1,088 | 0.59% | 0.96% | 1.14% |
| Other race alone (NH) | 44 | 55 | 328 | 0.09% | 0.08% | 0.34% |
| Mixed/multiracial (NH) | 637 | 1,291 | 3,257 | 1.28% | 1.77% | 3.42% |
| Hispanic or Latino (any race) | 3,337 | 9,302 | 13,092 | 6.72% | 12.76% | 13.73% |
| Total | 49,663 | 72,897 | 95,342 | 100.00% | 100.00% | 100.00% |

=== 2020 census ===
As of the 2020 census, St. George had a population of 95,342. The median age was 36.7 years. 25.7% of residents were under the age of 18 and 22.4% of residents were 65 years of age or older. For every 100 women there were 94.7 men, and for every 100 women age 18 and over there were 91.7 men age 18 and over.

95.5% of residents lived in urban areas, while 4.5% lived in rural areas.

There were 33,554 households in St. George, of which 31.6% had children under the age of 18 living in them. Of all households, 58.1% were married-couple households, 14.0% were households with a male householder and no spouse or partner present, and 23.5% were households with a female householder and no spouse or partner present. About 21.6% of all households were made up of individuals and 12.6% had someone living alone who was 65 years of age or older.

There were 39,933 housing units, of which 16.0% were vacant. The homeowner vacancy rate was 1.8% and the rental vacancy rate was 8.1%.

Racial composition as of the 2020 census
| Race | Number | Percent |
|---|---|---|
| White | 77,345 | 81.1% |
| Black or African American | 675 | 0.7% |
| American Indian and Alaska Native | 1,370 | 1.4% |
| Asian | 1,170 | 1.2% |
| Native Hawaiian and Other Pacific Islander | 1,120 | 1.2% |
| Some other race | 6,131 | 6.4% |
| Two or more races | 7,531 | 7.9% |
| Hispanic or Latino (of any race) | 13,092 | 13.7% |

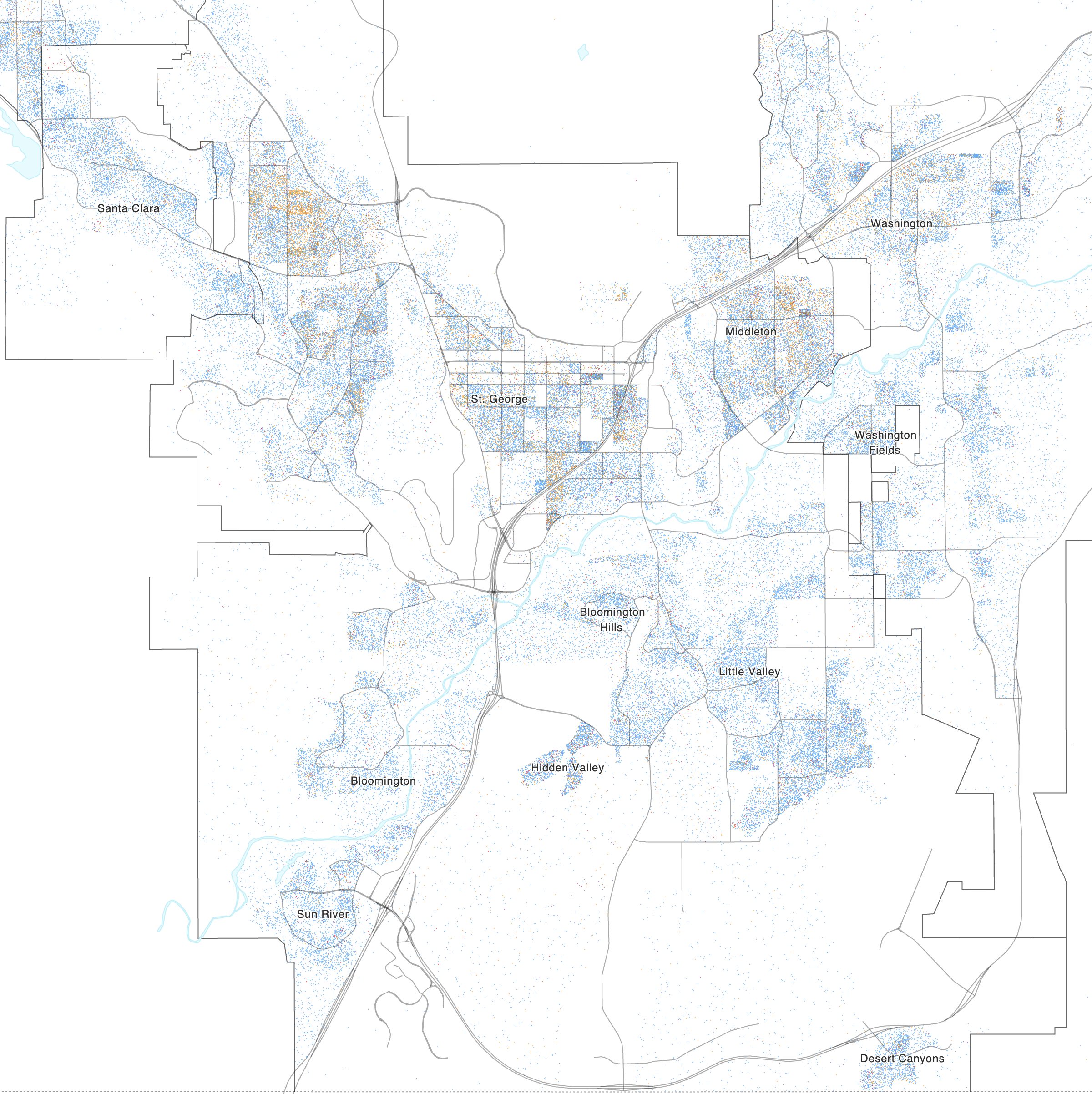
Map of racial distribution in St. George, 2020 U.S. census. Each dot is one person: ⬤ White ⬤ Black ⬤ Asian ⬤ Hispanic ⬤ Multiracial ⬤ Native American/Other

=== 2010 census ===
As of the 2010 census, 72,897 people, 27,552 households, and 13,042 families resided in the city. The population density was 1,135 people per square mile. There were 32,089 housing units at an average density of 415.9 per square mile. The city's racial makeup was 87.2% White, 0.7% African-American, 1.5% Native American, 0.8% Asian, 1.0% Pacific Islander, and 8.9% from other races. 12.8% of the population was Hispanic or Latino of any race.

=== 2000 census ===
As of the 2000 census, 49,728 people, 17,367 households, and 13,042 families resided in the city. The population density was 771.2 people per square mile (297.7/km^{2}). The 21,083 housing units had an average density of 327.4 per square mile (126.4/km^{2}). The racial makeup of the city was 92.27% White, 0.24% African American, 1.64% Native American, 0.57% Asian, 0.59% Pacific Islander, 2.87% from other races, and 1.83% from two or more races. Hispanics or Latinos of any race were 6.72% of the population.

Of the 17,367 households, 34.2% had children under 18 living with them, 63.6% were married couples living together, 8.6% had a female householder with no husband present, and 24.9% were not families. About 19.4% of all households were made up of individuals, and 10.2% have someone living alone who was 65 or older. The average household size was 2.81 and the average family size was 3.21.

In the city, the age distribution was 28.4% under 18, 13.7% from 18 to 24, 22.0% from 25 to 44, 16.8% from 45 to 64, and 19.3% who were 65 or older. The median age was 31 years. For every 100 women, there were 94.5 men. For every 100 women 18 and over, there were 91.2 men.

The median income for a household in the city was $36,505, and for a family was $41,788. Men had a median income of $31,106 versus $20,861 for women. The per capita income for the city was $17,022. About 7.4% of families and 11.6% of the population were below the poverty line, including 14.4% of those under 18 and 4.4% of those 65 or over.

=== Religion ===
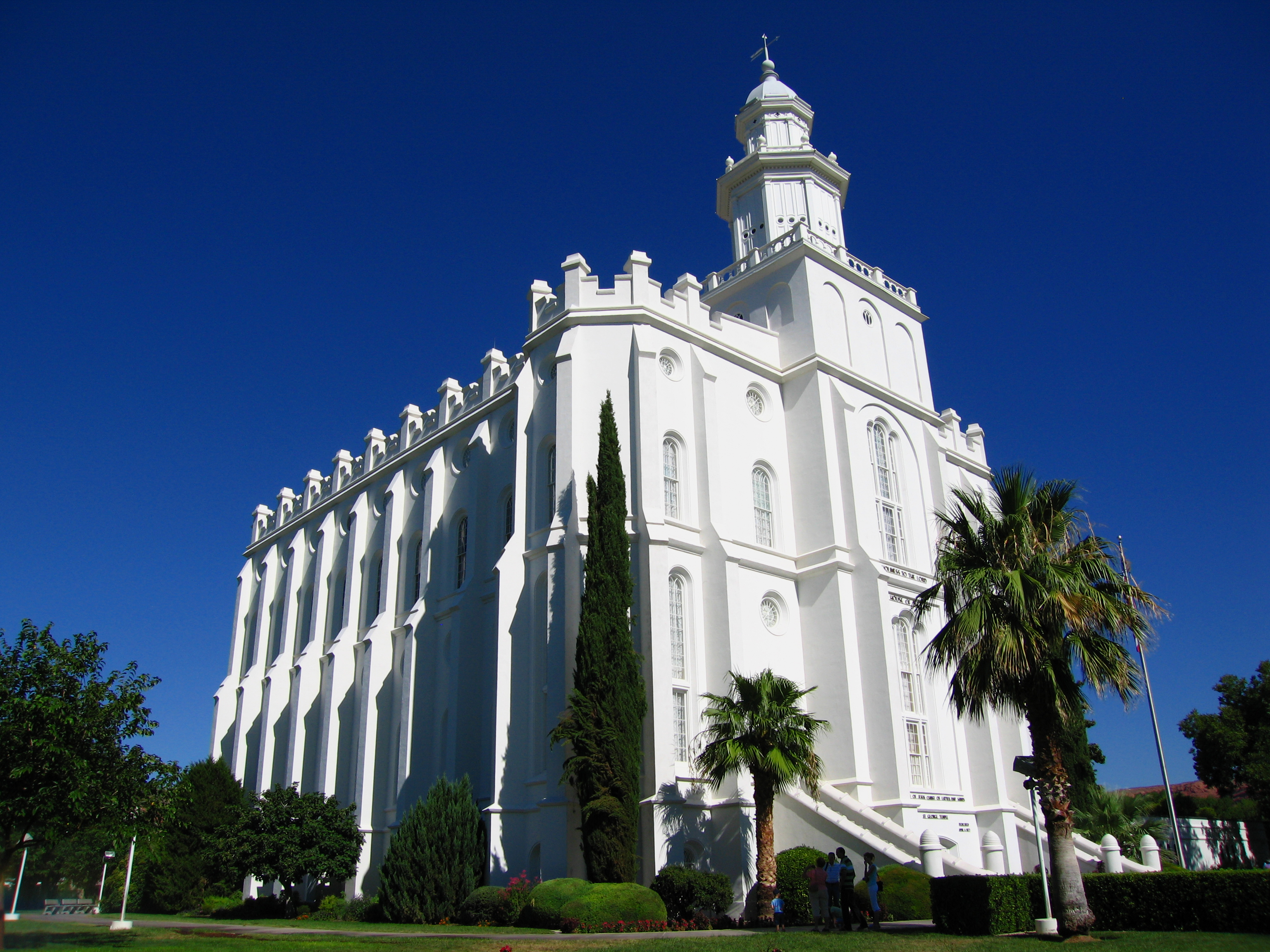
St. George Utah Temple of the Church of Jesus Christ of Latter-day Saints was completed in 1877.

About 78.0% of St. George's residents identify as religious; below are statistics as of 2014:

- 63.4% LDS Church
- 4.4% Catholic
- 0.8% Seventh-day Adventist
- 0.6% Baptist
- 0.5% Lutheran
- 0.4% Southern Baptist
- 0.3% Presbyterian
- 0.2% Episcopalian
- 0.2% United Methodist
- 0.2% Assemblies of God
- 1.0% Other

While specific data for irreligion are difficult to source for St. George, the following apply for Utah as a whole

- 22% Unaffiliated (religious nones)
- 3% Atheist
- 2% Agnostic
- 18% Nothing in particular
- 1% Don't know

== Economy ==
SkyWest Airlines, headquartered in St. George, is the primary airline provider at the city's regional airport.

The Washington County School District main offices are based in the city.

The Cafe Rio restaurant chain was started in St. George in 1997, but is now headquartered in Salt Lake City. The Swig restaurant chain was founded in St. George.

The local economy is largely based on tourism, manufacturing, and new-home construction. Over a dozen golf courses offer year-round golfing, and various world-recognized events also make for large contributors to the city's economy. The city is a popular retirement destination and also hosts a significant number of vacation homes for people who primarily live in colder areas.

== Arts and culture ==
The city of St. George sponsors art shows and concerts at Vernon Worthen Park. The Southwest Symphony Orchestra and Southern Utah Heritage Choir are in St. George. The Downtown Arts District features "Art Around the Corner", with sculptures and statues depicting cultural themes from around the world, and hosts the annual St. George Arts Festival each spring. Other major events include the St. George Parade of Homes; the Dixie Roundup Rodeo; St. George Marathon; St. George Ironman triathlon; and the Huntsman World Senior Games.

=== Venues, museums, and sites ===
- Brigham Young Winter Home and Office
- Burns Arena
- Dixie Center
- Jacob Hamblin House
- St. George Children's Museum
- St. George Dinosaur Discovery Site
- St. George Utah Temple
- Town Square Park

=== Shopping ===
The Red Cliffs Mall is an indoor shopping mall built in 1990. There are additional commercial districts on River Road, St. George Boulevard, and Bluff Street.

== Sports ==
The St. George community has been the home to two minor-league independent baseball teams. The first, the St. George Pioneerzz (originally the Zion Pioneerzz), played in the independent Western Baseball League from 1999 to 2001, winning the league championship in 2000. A new franchise, managed by former major league player Darell Evans, was awarded to St. George in 2007. The team, the St. George Roadrunners, played in the independent Golden Baseball League before being taken over by the league and moved to Henderson, Nevada, in 2010.

St. George area high schools—Crimson Cliffs, Dixie, Desert Hills, Pine View, and Snow Canyon—all play in 4A state competition as part of 4A Region 9 with nearby Hurricane High School in Hurricane and Cedar High School in Cedar City. Utah Tech University participates in the NCAA Division I Western Athletic Conference. In January 2019, Dixie State announced they were reclassifying to NCAA Division I and joining the Western Athletic Conference. Former DSU athletes include Corey Dillon, Anton Palepoi, Reno Mahe, and Scott Brumfield, who all later played in the NFL, and Marcus Banks, Lionel Hollins, Keon Clark, and Mo Baker were Dixie players who later played in the NBA. Utah Tech athletes are called Trailblazers (formerly the Rebels and Red Storm), and former Trailblazers Bradley Thompson and Brandon Lyon later played in major league baseball, while Bruce Hurst of Dixie High School later played for the Boston Red Sox as a pitcher, and then ended up managing the now-retired Zion Pioneerzz for its inaugural 1999 season (1999).

St. George has hosted Ironman and Ironman 70.3 events, including the 2021 Ironman 70.3 World Championships. In May 2021, the Ironman World Championship hosted by the city due to the COVID-19 and the original venue, Kona, being unable to host. This was the first time that the Ironman World Championship has been hosted outside of Hawai'i.

== Parks and recreation ==
The St. George parks division manages over 20 city parks and nearly 60 miles of paved urban trails interlinking neighborhoods, communities, parks, and open space. The city also has over a dozen award-winning golf courses, making the area a Southwestern golfing destination. Major parks and sites include the Canyons Softball Complex, Little Valley Softball Complex, Pioneer Park, Tonaquint Nature Center, nationally recognized Snake Hollow bike park, Thunder Junction All Abilities dinosaur theme park, Red Hills Desert Garden - a public water-conservation garden displaying both native and exotic flora suited for the local climate, and three local skate parks; Legacy Regional Park and fairgrounds are just east of the city in Hurricane. The St. George area has several public recreation centers: the St. George Rec Center and Sand Hollow Aquatics Center and Washington City Rec Center. St. George is fast becoming a popular rock-climbing and mountain-biking destination.

== Government ==
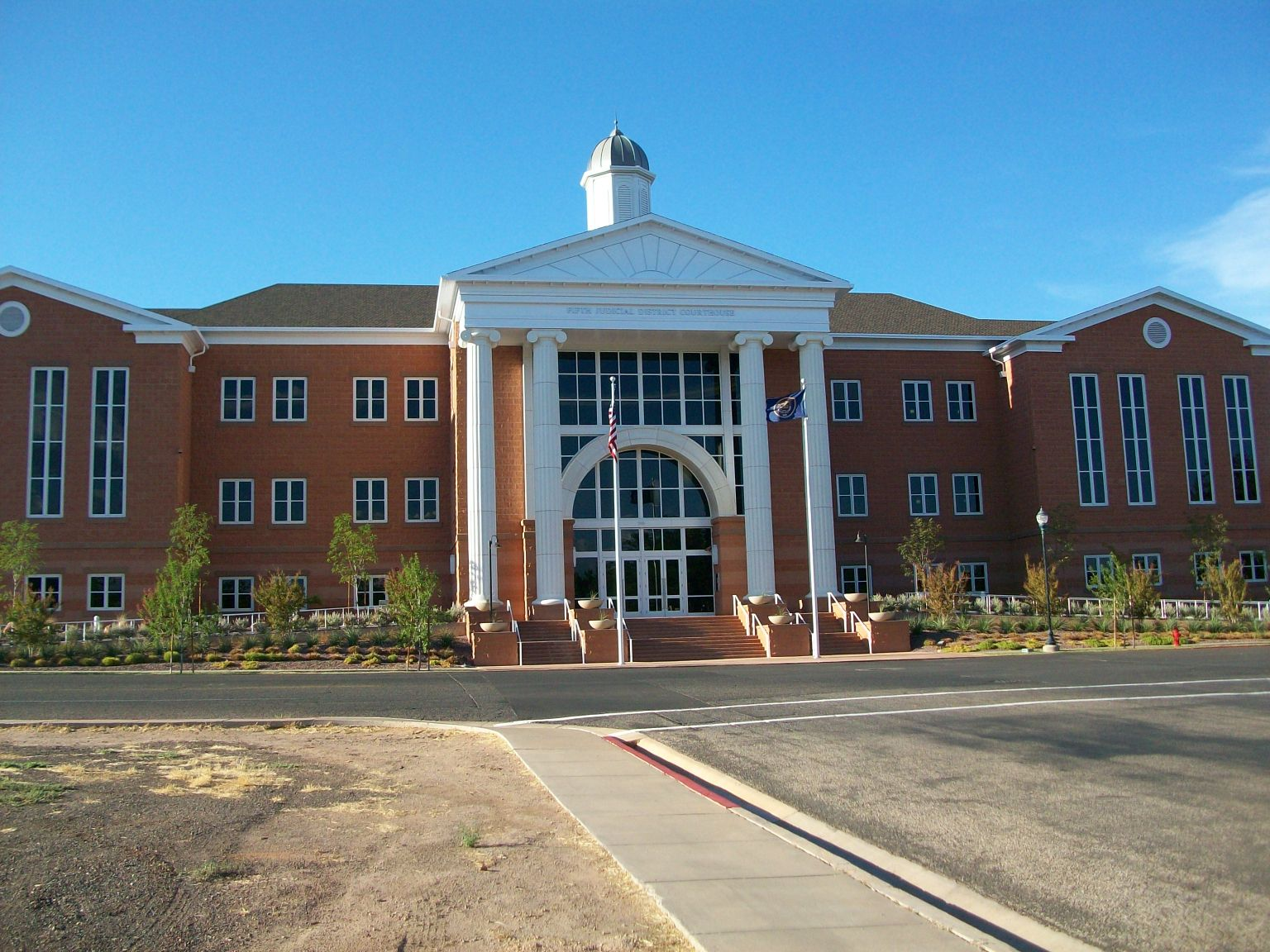
5th District Courthouse

The city of St. George has a council-manager form of government, with five representatives elected at large. The mayor, also elected at large, also serves as a member on the city council. The council hires a city manager to deal with regular operations. As of January 2021, the mayor of St. George is Michele Randall. The city manager is John Willis.

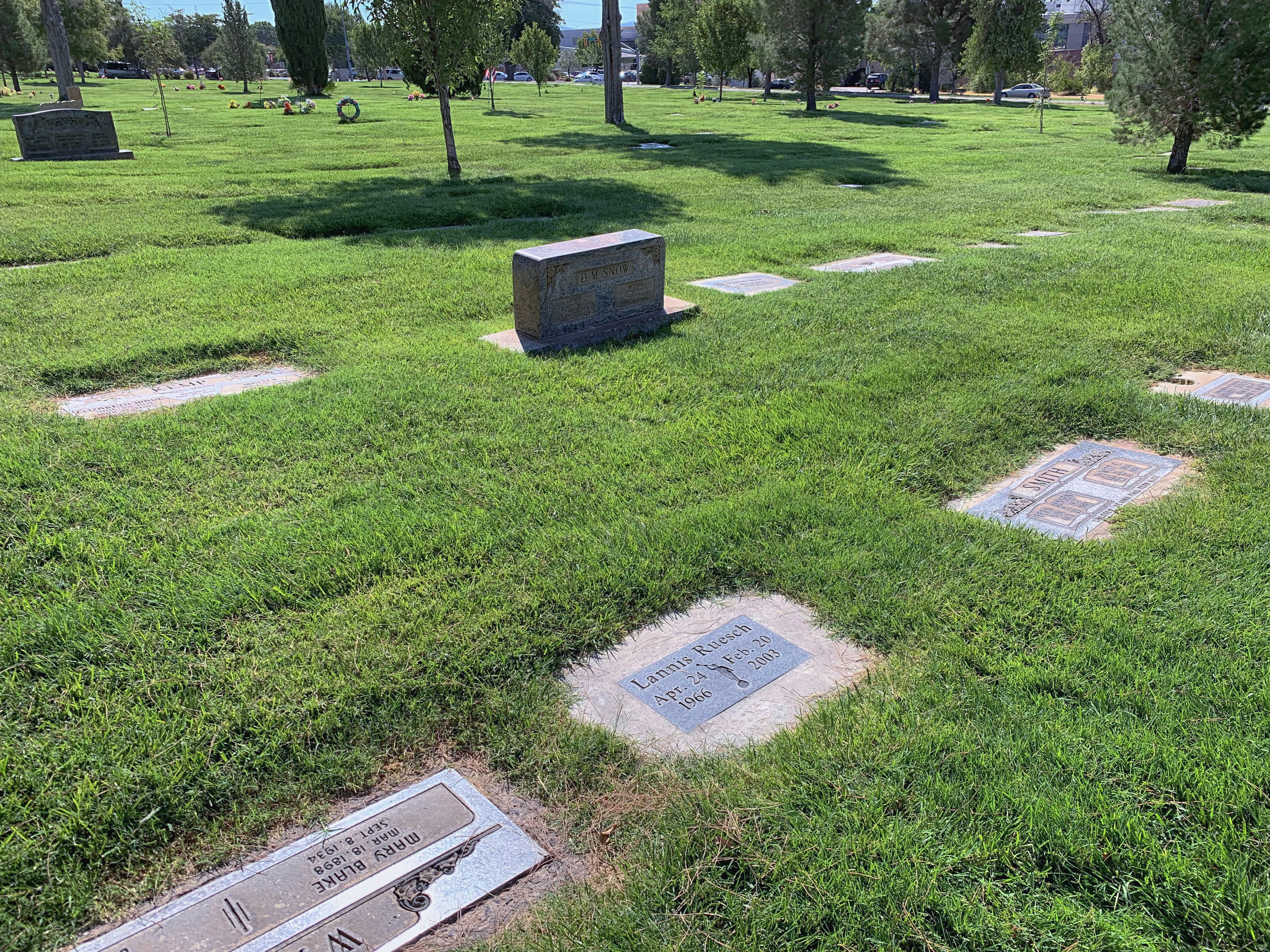
St. George City Cemetery (East Tabrnacle at 700 East)

Council members are Jimmy Hughes, Dannielle Larkin, Natalie Larsen, Michelle Tanner, and Steve Kemp. City council meetings are held on the first and third Thursdays of each month at the city council chambers.

The U.S. Federal Courthouse, Washington County Justice Court, Juvenile Court, and the Fifth District Courthouse are downtown.

== Education ==
=== Primary and secondary education ===
The city of St. George is a part of the Washington County School District. The city's middle schools are near or adjacent to the like-named high schools.

==== Intermediate (6th-7th grade) and middle schools (8th-9th grade) ====
- Dixie Middle School
- Pine View Middle School
- Desert Hills Middle School
- Snow Canyon Middle School
- Crimson Cliffs Middle School in Washington City
- Washington Fields Intermediate in Washington City
- Dixie Intermediate
- Sunrise Ridge Intermediate
- Fossil Ridge Intermediate
- Lava Ridge Intermediate in Santa Clara (western suburb)

==== High schools ====
St. George public high schools (10th–12th grade):

- Career Tech High School
- Crimson Cliffs High School in Washington City (eastern suburb). Its coverage zone extends into southeast St. George.
- Desert Hills High School
- Dixie High School
- Millcreek Alternative High School
- Pine View High School
- Snow Canyon High School
- St George Academy in Washington City College Prep Charter High School that serves St. George and surrounding communities.
- Utah Arts Academy in St. George, Utah (northwestern suburb) offers an alternative education with no tuition costs to any Utah resident.
- The Southern Utah Center for Computer, Engineering, and Science Students (SUCCESS) is an early college high school located on the Utah Tech University campus.

=== Higher education ===
- Dixie Technical College with 4,920 post-secondary and 292 secondary students (as of 2018). Dixie Technical College opened a new main campus on the site of the old St. George Airport in 2018.
- Rocky Vista University College of Osteopathic Medicine
- University of Phoenix
- Utah State University St. George Campus
- Utah Tech University, a four-year institution, of 12,567 students (as of 2023)

== Media ==
=== Radio ===
| Call sign | Frequency | Format | Notes |
|---|---|---|---|
| KDXU | 890 AM & 93.5 FM | Talk radio | |
| KLGU | 90.3 FM | Christian contemporary | |
| KUTU | 91.3 & 94.9 FM | Variety (radio) | |
| KZHK | 95.9 FM | Classic rock | |
| KCLS | 96.3 FM | Active Rock | |
| KRQX | 98.9 FM | Classic Hits | |
| KONY | 99.9 FM | Country music | |
| KCAY | 100.7 FM | Oldies | |
| KFUR-LP | 101.1 FM | Regional Mexican | |
| K272AQ | 102.3 FM | Oldies | Repeater of KDXU-FM, Colorado City, Arizona |
| K279BN | 103.7 FM | Oldies | Repeater of KJUL, Las Vegas, Nevada |
| KURR | 103.1 FM | Top 40 | |
| KUTQ | 102.3 FM | Country music | |
| KZYN | 104.1 FM | Adult Alternative | |
| KPLD | 94.1 & 105.1 | Hot adult contemporary | |
| KWBR-LP | 105.7 FM | Smooth Jazz | |
| KIYK | 107.3 FM | Hot adult contemporary | |
| KHKR | 1210 AM | Sports radio | |
| KSGO | 1450 AM-93.1 FM | Conservative talk radio | |

==== Newspapers ====
- The Spectrum, which is owned by Gannett, is the local daily newspaper.
- The Independent newspaper offers a monthly print edition featuring local news, arts, entertainment, and events coverage. It also provides free online daily news and an online community events calendar.
- St. George News (stgnews.com) is free-access online news.
- Southern Utah Weekly is a weekly newspaper.

The Salt Lake Tribune, Deseret News, Las Vegas Review-Journal, and Las Vegas Sun are also distributed in St. George and offer home delivery.

Other publications include St. George Magazine, a monthly covering a variety of local content, and View on Southern Utah, a magazine offering a variety of content for the southern Utah, southern Nevada, and northwestern Arizona areas.

==== Television ====
St. George is in the Salt Lake City market, so it has only one television station licensed to the city, KMYU, a MyNetworkTV affiliate on channel 12. KMYU (known as My Utah TV) is sister station to CBS affiliate KUTV, and operates out of KUTV's offices in Salt Lake City, although the station has a news bureau with a reporter and photographer based in St. George and KUTV simulcasts on KMYU-DT2. Also in St. George are the offices of Cedar City, Utah–licensed KCSG Channel 8, a MeTV owned-and-operated station. The city also receives local TV channels from Salt Lake City with broadcast translators in the St. George area.

NBC's Las Vegas affiliate, KSNV-DT, has a local translator owned by Cherry Creek Radio, KVBT-LP channel 41, on which some of its programming airs two hours later than the same programming broadcast on Salt Lake City NBC affiliate KSL-TV.

== Infrastructure ==
=== Healthcare ===
St. George Regional Hospital is an Intermountain Health Care hospital and the only 24-hour trauma center between Las Vegas and the Wasatch Front, serving the tristate region of southern Utah, northwest Arizona, and southeastern Nevada.

=== Utilities ===
St. George is served by City of St. George Power, which serves most of the city, and Dixie Power, which serves southern areas of the city. Rocky Mountain Power serves parts of the greater St. George area. The municipal water department obtains its own water from wells located near Gunlock and in Snow Canyon State Park, Mountain Springs on Pine Valley Mountain. It also purchases wholesale water from the Washington County Water Conservancy District, which is sourced from the Virgin River and purified at the Quail Creek Water Treatment Plant.

St. George Telecommunications, such as Internet, are provided by TDS Telecom (cable/fiber), CenturyLink (DSL/fiber), Quantum(fiber) and InfoWest (WISP/fiber)

=== Transportation ===
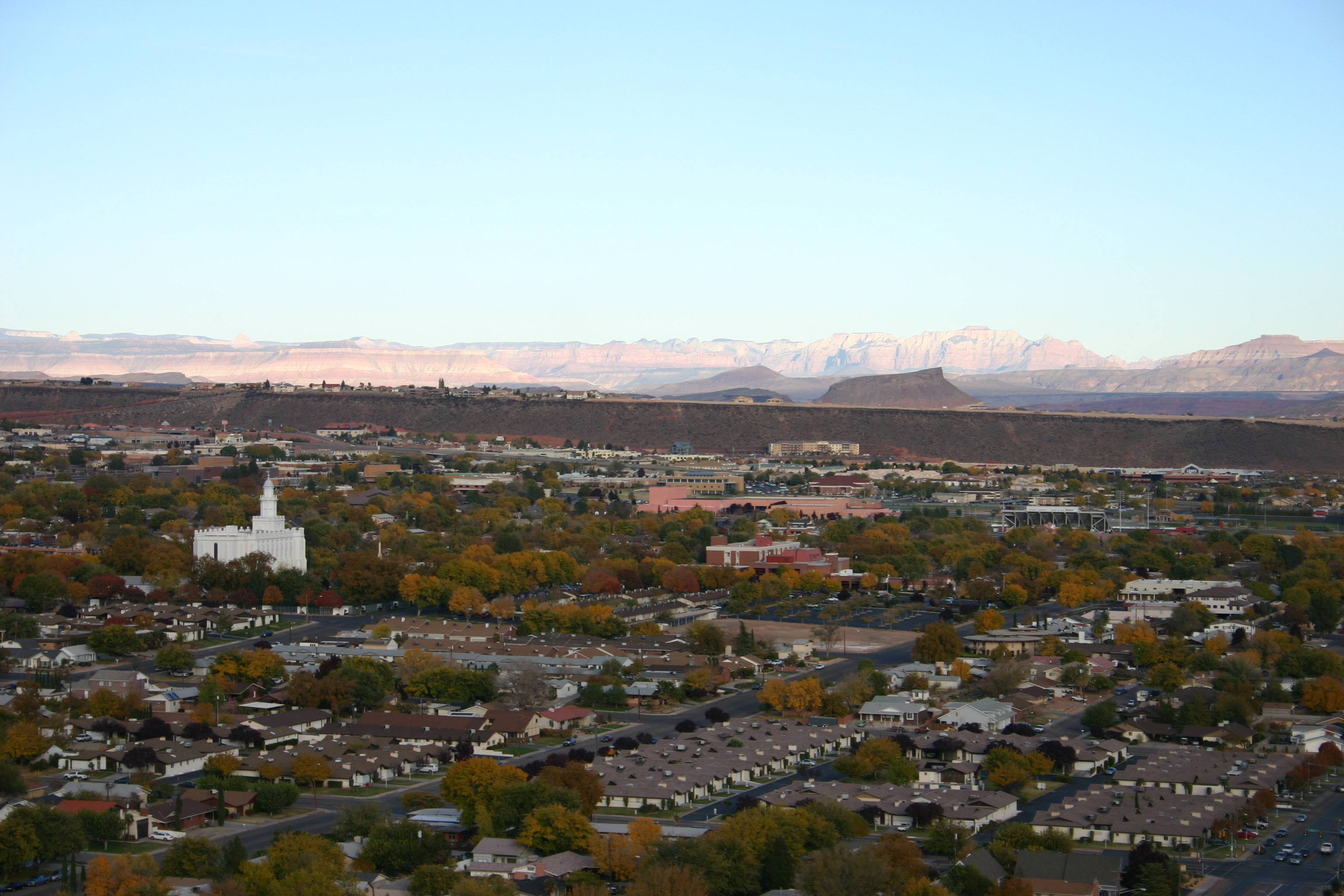
Central St. George, looking east with Zion National Park in the distance

St. George Regional Airport is in southeast St. George on Airport Parkway. The airport is served by American Airlines, Delta Air Lines, and United Airlines. All flights are operated by SkyWest Airlines. As of 2023, two-way flights to Salt Lake City, Denver, Phoenix, Los Angeles (LAX), and Dallas–Fort Worth were available.

==== Local and regional transportation ====
SunTran, the local public transit system, operates seven fixed routes serving most areas of St. George, Washington, and Ivins. Rent-A-Bike and Spin scooters are available for rated use in numerous locations citywide. Greyhound serves St. George on its Denver–Las Vegas and Salt Lake City–Las Vegas routes. Greyhound used to connect with Amtrak's California Zephyr in Salt Lake City at the Salt Lake Central Intermodal Hub, but now stops at Salt Lake International Airport instead as a result of its acquisition by FirstGroup. St. George is also served by the bus company Tufesa and the shuttle companies Salt Lake Express and St. George Shuttle.

==== Major highways ====
Two freeways within St. George include Interstate 15 which runs northeast–southwest through the city and SR-7 (Southern Parkway) which runs east–west through the southern periphery of the city. Other highways in St. George include SR-8 (Sunset Boulevard), SR-34 (St. George Boulevard) and SR-18 (Bluff Street); the former two run east–west and the latter runs north–south through St. George.

== Notable people ==
- Robert Adamson (b. 1985), actor (Lincoln Heights)
- Texas Rose Bascom (1922–1993), rodeo performer, Utah Cowboy Hall of Fame inductee
- Jay Don Blake (b. 1958), professional and NCAA champion golfer
- Wilford Brimley, American actor and singer
- Juanita Brooks, Mormon writer, editor and historian
- Howard Cannon, former United States Senator from Nevada
- Asia Carrera, adult film star
- LaVell Edwards (1930–2016), former BYU football coach
- Jada Facer, actress and singer
- Orval Hafen, lawyer, legislator, and community advocate
- Tracy Hickman, fantasy author
- Jeffrey R. Holland, LDS general authority
- Douglas I. Hunt, member of the Utah House of Representatives
- Bruce Hurst (b. 1958), former Major League Baseball pitcher
- Doug Jolley (b. 1979), NFL tight end
- Steven Koecher, living in St. George at the time he disappeared.
- Meg and Dia, rock group
- The Piano Guys, classical music group, formed in 2010
- Amanda Righetti (b. 1983), actress (The O.C., Reunion, The Mentalist)
- Tyler James Robinson (b. 2003), accused suspect in the assassination of Charlie Kirk
- Gaskell Romney (1871–1955), Mormon leader, father of George W. Romney, grandfather of Mitt Romney
- Miles Romney (1806–1877), settler, Mormon leader
- Miles Park Romney (1843–1904), attorney, police chief
- Shaye Scott, social media personality
- J. Edwin Seegmiller (1923–2006), physician and medical researcher, National Academy of Sciences
- Steven E. Snow, (b. 1949), lawyer, LDS general authority, Church Historian and Recorder
- John "Cat" Thompson (1906–1990), basketball player; member of the Basketball Hall of Fame
- Tanya Tucker (b. 1958), country music singer, raised in St. George
- Brendon Urie (b. 1987), American singer and musician, lead vocalist of Panic! at the Disco
- Joyce Vance, U.S. Attorney for the Northern District of Alabama and media legal analyst
- Emily Willis, pornographic actress
- J. Walter Woodbury, electrophysiologist
